= Status of Jerusalem =

Legal and diplomatic status

The status of Jerusalem has been described as "one of the most intractable issues in the Israeli–Palestinian conflict" due to the long-running territorial dispute between Israel and Palestine, both of which claim it as their capital city. Part of this issue of sovereignty is tied to concerns over access to the holy sites of Jerusalem in the Abrahamic religions; the current religious environment in Jerusalem is upheld by the "Status Quo" of the former Ottoman Empire. As the Israeli–Palestinian peace process has primarily navigated the option of a two-state solution, one of the largest points of contention has been East Jerusalem, which was part of the Jordanian-annexed West Bank until the beginning of the Israeli occupation in 1967.

The United Nations recognizes East Jerusalem (and the West Bank as a whole) as being a part of Palestine, thus rejecting Israel's claim to that half of the city. There is broader consensus among the international community with regard to West Jerusalem being Israel's capital city, as it falls within Israel's sovereign territory (per the Green Line) and has been recognized as under Israeli control since the 1949 Armistice Agreements.

Most countries and organizations support that West Jerusalem and East Jerusalem should be allocated as capital cities to the Israelis and the Palestinians, respectively; this position has been endorsed by the United Nations, the European Union, and France, among others. Russia, which is a member of the Middle East Quartet, already recognizes East Jerusalem as the Palestinian capital and West Jerusalem as the Israeli capital.

The majority of United Nations member states hold the view that the city's final status should be resolved through negotiations and have therefore favoured locating their embassies to Israel in Tel Aviv, pending a final status agreement. Eight countries have embassies to Israel in Jerusalem: the United States, Fiji, Guatemala, Honduras, Papua New Guinea, Paraguay, Nauru, and Colombia, alongside the disputed nations of Kosovo and Somaliland; while the Czech Republic, Hungary and Slovakia maintain branches of their embassies to Israel in Jerusalem.

== Background ==
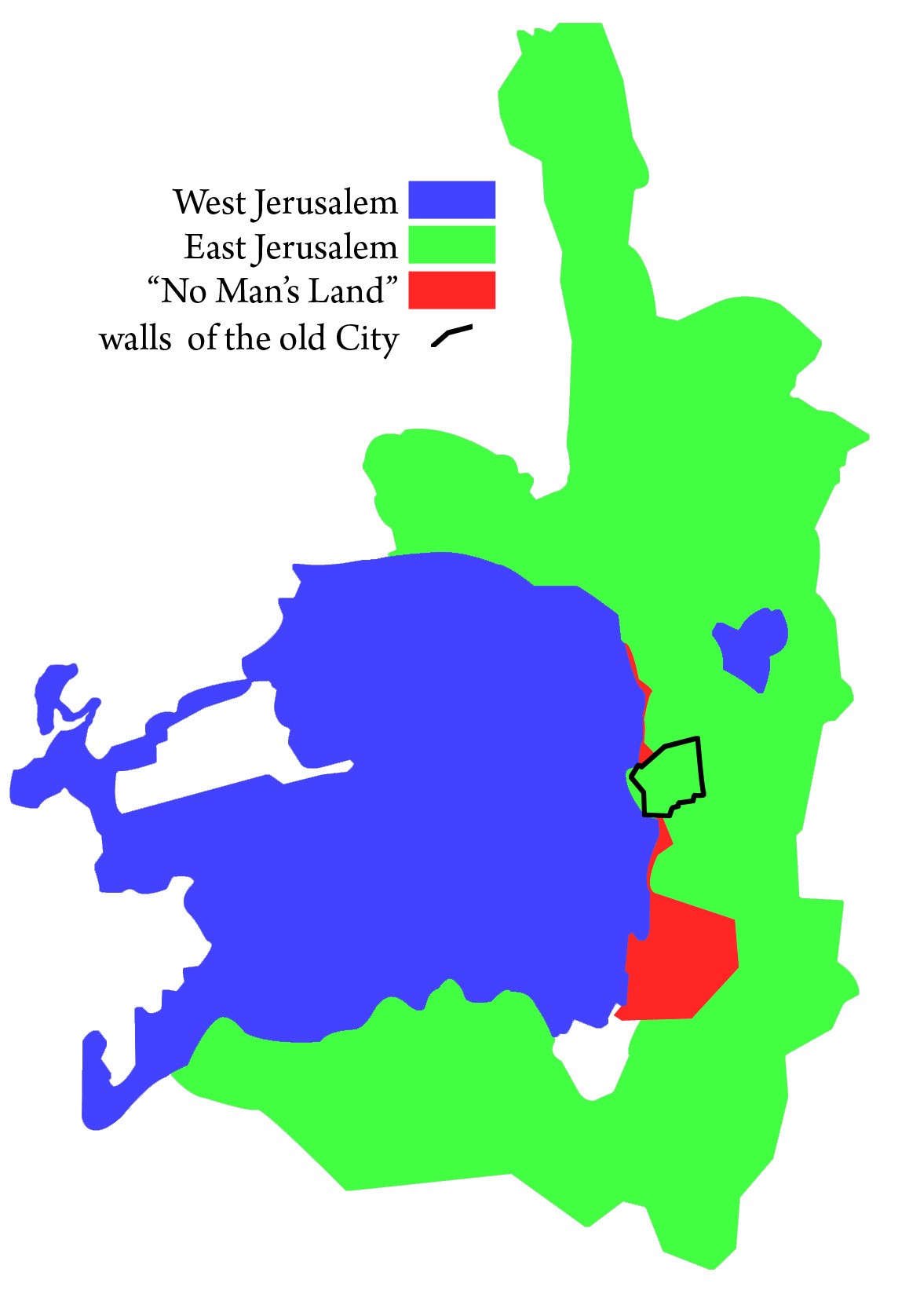
Jerusalem municipal area

From 1517 until the First World War, Jerusalem was part of the Ottoman Empire. It was part of the Damascus eyalet (province) until, as a result of widespread administrative reform in the mid-1800s, it became an independent sanjak (district) in 1872. From the 1860s, the Jewish community became the largest religious minority grouping in the city and from 1887, with the beginning of expansion outside the old city walls, became a majority.

Throughout the 19th century, European powers were competing for influence in the city, usually on the basis (or pretext) of extending protection over Christian churches and holy places. Much of the property that is now owned by the churches was bought during this time. A number of these countries, most notably France, entered into capitulation agreements with the Ottoman Empire and also established consulates in Jerusalem. In 1847, with Ottoman approval, the first Latin patriarch of Jerusalem since the Crusades was established.

After capturing Jerusalem in 1917, the United Kingdom was in control of Jerusalem; initially under a wartime administration, then as part of the Mandate of Palestine assigned to Britain in 1920. The principal Allied Powers recognized the unique spiritual and religious interests in Jerusalem among the world's Abrahamic religions as "a sacred trust of civilization", and stipulated that the existing rights and claims connected with it be safeguarded in perpetuity, under international guarantee.

However, the Arab and Jewish communities in Palestine were in mortal dispute and Britain sought United Nations assistance in resolving the dispute. During the negotiations of proposals for a resolution that culminated in the United Nations Partition Plan for Palestine (also known as Resolution 181) in November 1947, the historic claims of the Vatican, Italy and France were revived. The Vatican's historic claims and interests, as well as those of Italy and France were based on the former Protectorate of the Holy See and the French Protectorate of Jerusalem. From their point of view this proposal was essentially to safeguard Christian holy sites and was expressed as a call for the special international regime for the city of Jerusalem. This status was also confirmed in UN General Assembly Resolution 194 in 1948, which maintained the position that Jerusalem be made an international city.

The United Nations Partition Plan called for the partition of Palestine into separate Arab and Jewish states, with Jerusalem (with borders expanded to include Bethlehem, see UN map of Jerusalem) being established as a corpus separatum, or a "separated body", with a special legal and political status, administered by the United Nations. The Free City of Danzig was a historical precedent for this solution; Trieste was a contemporaneous city ruled by the UN. Jewish representatives accepted the partition plan, while representatives of the Palestinian Arabs and the Arab states rejected it, declaring it illegal.

On 14 May 1948, the Jewish community in Palestine issued the Declaration of the Establishment of the State of Israel, stating that it was "prepared to cooperate with [the UN] in implementing [the UN Partition Plan]". Israel became a member of the United Nations the following year and has since been recognised by most countries. The countries recognizing Israel did not necessarily recognize its sovereignty over Jerusalem generally, citing the UN resolutions which called for an international status for the city. The United States, Guatemala, Honduras and Kosovo have embassies in Jerusalem.

With the Declaration of the Establishment of the State of Israel and the subsequent invasion by surrounding Arab states, the UN proposal for Jerusalem was never implemented. The 1949 Armistice Agreements left Jordan in control of the eastern parts of Jerusalem, while the western sector (with the exception of the Mount Scopus exclave in the east) was held by Israel. Each side recognised the other's de facto control of their respective sectors. The Armistice Agreement, however, was considered internationally as having no legal effect on the continued validity of the provisions of the partition resolution for the internationalisation of Jerusalem. In 1950, Jordan annexed East Jerusalem as part of its larger annexation of the West Bank. Though the United Kingdom and Iraq recognized Jordanian rule over East Jerusalem, no other country recognized either Jordanian or Israeli rule over the respective areas of the city under their control. Pakistan is sometimes falsely claimed to have recognized the annexation as well.

Following the Six-Day War of 1967, Israel declared that Israeli law would be applied to East Jerusalem and enlarged its eastern boundaries, approximately doubling its size. The action was deemed unlawful by other states who did not recognize it. It was condemned by the UN Security Council and General Assembly which described it as an annexation and a violation of the rights of the Palestinian population. In 1980, Israel passed the Jerusalem Law, which declared that "Jerusalem, complete and united, is the capital of Israel". The Security Council declared the law null and void in Resolution 478, which also called upon member states to withdraw their diplomatic missions from the city. The UN General Assembly has also passed numerous resolutions to the same effect.

== Prelude: UN resolution from 1947 ==
On 29 November 1947 the UN General Assembly passed a resolution which, as part of its Partition Plan for Palestine, included the establishment of Jerusalem as a separate international entity under the auspices of the United Nations, a so-called corpus separatum.

== Israel ==
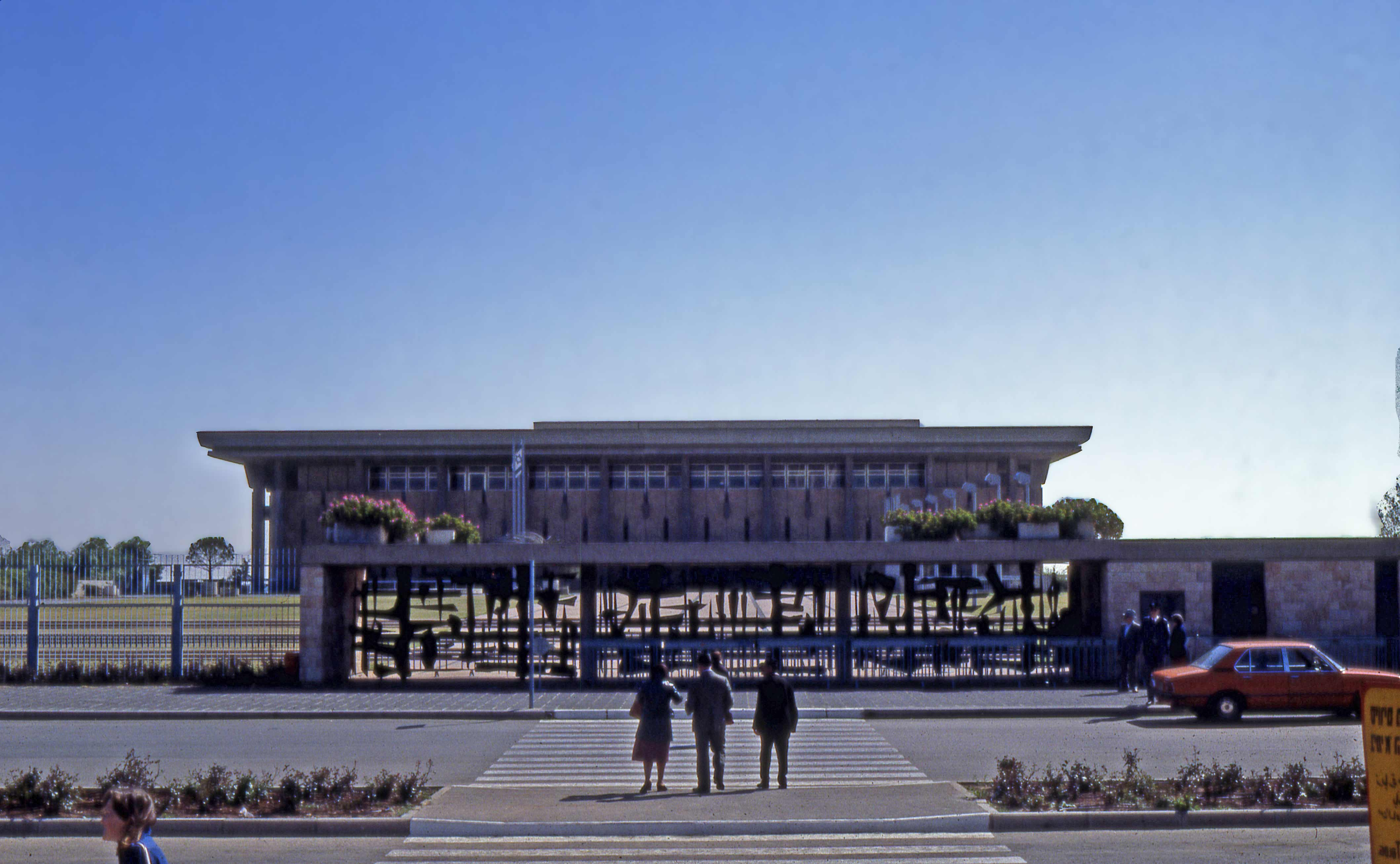
The Knesset (Israel's parliament), located in Givat Ram, Jerusalem

During the 1948 Arab–Israeli War, Israel took control of West Jerusalem while Jordan took control of East Jerusalem (including the walled Old City in which most holy places are located). Although accepting partition before the war, Israel rejected the UN's corpus separatum decision at the Lausanne Conference of 1949, and instead indicated a preference for division of Jerusalem into Jewish and Arab zones, and international control and protection only for holy places and sites. Also in 1949, as the UN General Assembly began debating the implementation of its corpus separatum decision, Israel declared Jerusalem as Israel's "eternal capital".

After Israel conquered East Jerusalem from Jordan in 1967 during the Six-Day War, Israel argued that it had the stronger right to the city. Very soon after its conquest of East Jerusalem in 1967, Israel merged East Jerusalem with West Jerusalem by administratively extending the municipal boundary of the city.

In July 1980, the Knesset passed the Jerusalem Law as part of the country's Basic Law, which declared Jerusalem the unified capital of Israel.

=== Legal positions since Oslo Accords ===
According to a 1999 statement by the Israeli Ministry of Foreign Affairs, "There is no basis in international law for the position supporting a status of 'corpus separatum' (separate entity) for the city of Jerusalem." In the view of the ministry, the concept of corpus separatum became irrelevant after the Arab states rejected the United Nations Partition Plan for Palestine and invaded the newly created State of Israel in 1948. Accordingly, the ministry states, "There has never been any agreement, treaty, or international understanding which applies the 'Corpus Separatum' concept to Jerusalem."

In 2003 Israel argued that Jordan had no rights to any land west of the Jordan River, that it had taken the West Bank and East Jerusalem by an act of aggression, and therefore never acquired sovereignty.

Positions on the final status of Jerusalem have varied with different Israeli governments. The Oslo Accords declared that the final status of Jerusalem would be negotiated, but Israeli Prime Minister Yitzhak Rabin declared that he would never divide the city. In 1995, he allegedly told a group of school children that "if they told us peace is the price of giving up a united Jerusalem under Israeli sovereignty, my reply would be 'let's do without peace'". This position was upheld by his successor, Benjamin Netanyahu, who stated there would be "...No withdrawal or even discussion of the case of Jerusalem...".

Netanyahu's successor, Ehud Barak, during negotiations, became the first Israeli prime minister to allow for a possible division of Jerusalem, despite his campaign promises.

Prime minister during the second intifada, Ariel Sharon was unequivocal in his support for an undivided Jerusalem. In an interview done one week before a stroke incapacitated him he stated: "Our position is that Jerusalem is not negotiable. We are not going to negotiate on Jerusalem. Jerusalem will be forever a united and undivided capital of Israel." Prime Minister (and former Jerusalem mayor) Ehud Olmert vowed to keep Jerusalem the "undivided, eternal capital of the Jewish people", but later supported the detachment of several Arab neighborhoods from Israeli sovereignty and the introduction of an international trust to run the Temple Mount.

When Netanyahu succeeded Olmert, he declared that "all of Jerusalem would always remain under Israeli sovereignty" and that only Israel would "ensure the freedom of religion and freedom of access for the three religions to the holy places". These statements seem to closely reflect Israeli public opinion. According to a 2012 poll by the right-wing Jerusalem Center for Public Affairs, 78% of Jewish voters who responded said that they would reconsider voting for any politician that wants to relinquish Israel's control over the Old City and East Jerusalem. On 17 May 2015, Prime Minister Benjamin Netanyahu reiterated, regarding Jerusalem serving as the capital of both Israel and a future Palestinian state, "Jerusalem has forever been the capital of only the Jewish people and no other nation."

On 2 January 2018 Israel passed into law new legislation that requires the two-thirds majority support of the Knesset for any section of Jerusalem to be transferred to a foreign government. On 25 January 2018, Netanyahu repeated the previous government position, saying: "Under any peace agreement, the capital of Israel will continue to be Jerusalem, and the seat of our government will continue to be in Jerusalem."

== Palestine ==
During the British Mandate, the main representation of the Palestinian Arabs was the Arab Higher Committee, formed in the beginning of the Great Arab revolt in 1936; it was outlawed in 1937 and its leaders deported. Reconstituted in 1945 and dominated by Palestinian Arabs, it continued in various iterations until 1948, when, viewed as a threat to Jordan, its army was forced to disband. There was unequivocal support for an Arab controlled Jerusalem (at that time the status quo).

Until the establishment of the Palestine Liberation Organization (PLO) in 1964, there was little in terms of an internationally recognised representation of the Palestinian Arabs. The Arab League usually took over the job, with the short-lived Egyptian-controlled All-Palestine Government based in Gaza having little sway, and Jordan taking control of the West Bank with East Jerusalem.

Until the Oslo Accords in 1993, and the Letters of Mutual Recognition, the Palestinians, represented since 1964 by the PLO, had at all times rejected any partition of any part of the former British Mandate territory. However, while they had previously rejected the UN's internationalisation plan, most of the Arab delegations at the Lausanne Conference of 1949 accepted a permanent international regime (called corpus separatum) under United Nations supervision as proposed in Resolutions 181 and 194. The Arabs vociferously objected to Israel moving to (West) Jerusalem its national institutions, namely the Knesset, the presidential, legislative, judicial and administrative offices.

The fight over Jerusalem is existential, not because it is a magical city but because it was, and is, the center of our culture, national identity and memory.

— Prominent Palestinian activist Sari Nusseibeh, Once Upon A Country: A Palestinian Life

The Palestinian leadership now claims the "1967 borders" (in effect the 1949 armistice lines) as the borders of the Palestinian territories, and includes East Jerusalem as part of these territories. Despite recognition of Israel (only from Fatah, not Hamas), and its support in 1949 of corpus separatum, it had never conceded sovereignty of Jerusalem. In 1988, Jordan conceded all claims to the West Bank, including Jerusalem, other than the Muslim holy places on the Temple Mount, and recognized the PLO as the legal representatives of the Palestinian people.

The Palestinian National Authority views East Jerusalem as occupied Palestinian territory, in line with UNSC Resolution 242. The PNA claims all of East Jerusalem, including the Temple Mount, as the capital of the State of Palestine, and claims that West Jerusalem is also subject to final status negotiations, but is willing to consider alternative solutions, such as making Jerusalem an open city. In the Palestine Liberation Organization's Palestinian Declaration of Independence of 1988, Jerusalem is called the capital of the State of Palestine. In 2000 the Palestinian Authority passed a law designating the city as such, and in 2002 this law was ratified by Chairman Yasser Arafat. The official position of the PNA is that Jerusalem should be an open city, with no physical partition and that Palestine would guarantee freedom of worship, access and the protection of sites of religious significance. The status quo on the Temple Mount now is that tourists are allowed to visit, but not pray, on the Temple Mount, although this seems to be slowly changing.

=== ICJ case — Palestine v. United States of America ===
In September 2018, the State of Palestine initiated an action in the International Court of Justice, in the case Palestine v. United States of America (officially titled Relocation of the United States Embassy to Jerusalem), in which Palestine charges the U.S. with violating the Vienna Convention on Diplomatic Relations by moving its embassy from Tel Aviv to Jerusalem, arguing the Convention requires that "the diplomatic mission of a sending State must be established on the territory of the receiving State." The Palestinian application argues that in international law Jerusalem cannot be considered to be the territory of the State of Israel because under General Assembly Resolution 181 of 1947 (the Partition Plan) Jerusalem was to have been placed under international governance, and thus precludes considering Jerusalem to be under the sovereignty of any State.

== United Nations ==
The United Nations considers East Jerusalem to be part of Israeli-occupied territories or occupied Palestinian territory. It envisions Jerusalem eventually becoming the capital of two states, Israel and Palestine. This is at odds with other General Assembly Resolutions, which promote an internationally administered Jerusalem.

1947 UN Partition Plan (Resolution 181(II)) provided for the full territorial internationalisation of Jerusalem:

"The City of Jerusalem shall be established as a corpus separatum under a special international regime and shall be administered by the United Nations."

The resolution was accepted by the Jewish leadership in Palestine, but rejected by the Arabs. This position was restated after the 1948 Arab–Israeli War in Resolution 194 of 1948 and in Resolution 303(IV) of 1949. According to a 1979 report prepared for and under the guidance of the Committee on the Exercise of the Inalienable Rights of the Palestinian People, it would appear that the United Nations has maintained the principle that the legal status of Jerusalem is that of a corpus separatum.

The United Nations General Assembly does not recognize Israel's proclamation of Jerusalem as the capital of Israel, which is, for example, reflected in the wording of General Assembly Resolution 63/30 of 2009 which states that "any actions taken by Israel, the occupying Power, to impose its laws, jurisdiction and administration on the Holy City of Jerusalem are illegal and therefore null and void and have no validity whatsoever, and calls upon Israel to cease all such illegal and unilateral measures."

Although the General Assembly cannot pass legally binding resolutions over international issues, the United Nations Security Council, which has the authority to do so, has passed a total of six Security Council resolutions on Israel on the matter, including UNSC resolution 478 which affirmed that the enactment of the 1980 Basic Jerusalem Law declaring unified Jerusalem as Israel's "eternal and indivisible" capital, was a violation of international law. The resolution advised member states to withdraw their diplomatic representation from the city. The Security Council, as well as the UN in general, has consistently affirmed the position that East Jerusalem (but not west Jerusalem) is occupied Palestinian territory subject to the provisions of the Fourth Geneva Convention. The International Court of Justice in its 2004 Advisory opinion on the "Legal Consequences of the Construction of a Wall in the Occupied Palestinian Territory" described East Jerusalem as "occupied Palestinian territory".

Many UN member states formally follow the UN position that Jerusalem should have an international status. The European Union has also followed the UN's lead in this regard, declaring Jerusalem's status to be that of a corpus separatum, or an international city to be administered by the UN.

Nevertheless, and inconsistent with the status of corpus separatum, the UN has designated East Jerusalem occupied Palestinian territory. China recognizes East Jerusalem as the capital of Palestine, and the United States has recognised at least West Jerusalem as Israel's capital. Secretary-General Ban Ki-moon said on 28 October 2009 that Jerusalem must be the capital of both Israel and Palestine. The UN has never revoked resolutions 181 and 194, and maintains the official position that Jerusalem should be placed under a special international regime.

== European Union ==
The European Union currently views the status of Jerusalem as that of a corpus separatum including both East and West Jerusalem as outlined in United Nations Resolution 181. In the interest of achieving a peaceful solution to the Arab–Israeli conflict, it believes a fair solution should be found regarding the issue of Jerusalem in the context of the two-state solution set out in the Road Map. Taking into account the political and religious concerns of all parties involved, it envisions the city serving as the shared capital of Israel and Palestine.

The EU opposes measures which would prejudge the outcome of permanent status negotiations on Jerusalem, basing its policy on the principles set out in UN Security Council Resolution 242, notably the impossibility of acquisition of territory by force. It will not recognise any changes to pre-1967 borders with regard to Jerusalem, unless agreed between the parties. It has also called for the reopening of Palestinian institutions in East Jerusalem, in accordance with the Road Map, in particular Orient House and the Chamber of Commerce, and has called on the Israeli government to "cease all discriminatory treatment of Palestinians in East Jerusalem, especially concerning work permits, access to education and health services, building permits, house demolitions, taxation and expenditure."

The European Union set out its position in a statement of principles last December. A two-state solution with Israel and Palestine side by side in peace and security. A viable state of Palestine in the West Bank, including East Jerusalem, and the Gaza Strip, on the basis of the 1967 lines. A way must be found to resolve the status of Jerusalem as the future capital of both Israel and Palestine.

— Catherine Ashton, High Representative for Foreign Affairs and Security Policy of the European Union

== Organisation of Islamic Cooperation ==
On 13 December 2017, the Organisation of Islamic Cooperation (OIC), consisting of 57 primarily Muslim countries, declared East Jerusalem as the capital of the State of Palestine and invited "all countries to recognise the State of Palestine and East Jerusalem as its occupied capital." The declaration makes no mention of Jerusalem as corpus separatum, nor makes any reference to West Jerusalem.

== Location of foreign embassies ==
After Israel passed the Jerusalem Law in 1980, the UN Security Council adopted Resolution 478, which called upon UN member states to withdraw their diplomatic missions from the city. Thirteen countries—Bolivia, Chile, Colombia, Costa Rica, Dominican Republic, Ecuador, El Salvador, Guatemala, Haiti, the Netherlands, Panama, Uruguay and Venezuela—moved their embassies from Jerusalem primarily to Tel Aviv. Costa Rica and El Salvador moved theirs back to Jerusalem in 1984. Costa Rica moved its embassy back to Tel Aviv in 2006 followed by El Salvador a few weeks later. No international embassy was located in Jerusalem again until 2018, although Bolivia had its embassy in Mevasseret Zion, a suburb 10 kilometres (6.2 mi) west of the city, until relations were severed in 2009 for a decade, then again in 2023.

Various countries recognized Israel as a state in the 1940s and 1950s, without recognizing Israeli sovereignty over West Jerusalem. There is an international sui generis consular corps in Jerusalem. It is commonly referred to as the "Consular Corps of the Corpus Separatum". The states that have maintained consulates in Jerusalem say that it was part of Mandate Palestine, and in a de jure sense has not since become part of any other sovereignty. The Netherlands maintains an office in Jerusalem serving mainly Israeli citizens. Other foreign governments base consulate general offices in Jerusalem, including Greece, Spain, and the United Kingdom. The United States had a consulate general in Jerusalem, which was merged into the Jerusalem-based embassy in 2018. Since the president of Israel resides in Jerusalem and confirms the foreign diplomats, ambassadors need to travel to Jerusalem to submit letters of credentials upon being appointed.

The United States relocated its embassy to Israel to Jerusalem in 2018, as did Guatemala. Honduras followed in 2021. A number of countries have indicated that they could relocate their embassies to Jerusalem in the future, including Australia, Brazil, the Czech Republic, the Dominican Republic and Serbia. In December 2020, the Czech Republic indicated that in 2021 it will open a Jerusalem branch office of the Czech Embassy in Tel Aviv. Hungary had previously opened an official diplomatic mission in Jerusalem. Kosovo committed to opening its embassy in Jerusalem when Israel and Kosovo established diplomatic relations in February 2021. By late 2022, only the United States, Guatemala, Honduras and the partially-recognized state of Kosovo maintain embassies in Jerusalem – Paraguay reversed the 2018 relocation of its embassy from Tel Aviv to Jerusalem within months and the Honduran foreign ministry have stated that they are also considering relocating theirs back to Tel Aviv. Fiji and Papua New Guinea opened their embassies in Jerusalem by the end of 2023, while Paraguay also announced its plans to reopen its embassy in Jerusalem in November 2023, making it effective in December 2024. Somaliland opened its first ever embassy in Jerusalem in June 2026. Colombia relocated its embassy from Tel Aviv to Jerusalem in October 2026.

Palestinian officials have consistently condemned each such relocation and diplomatic offices in Jerusalem, saying that they constitute "a flagrant violation of international law and goes against the unified EU position on the legal status of Jerusalem."

=== China ===
The People's Republic of China (PRC) recognizes East Jerusalem as the capital of the State of Palestine. In a 2016 speech to the Arab League, Chinese Communist Party general secretary Xi Jinping said that "China firmly supports the Middle East peace process and supports the establishment of a State of Palestine enjoying full sovereignty on the basis of the 1967 borders and with East Jerusalem as its capital." China announced that this position remains unchanged in the aftermath of the U.S. recognizing Jerusalem as Israel's capital.

=== France ===
The French Government notes that "It is up to the parties to come to a final and overall agreement with regard to the final status, which would put an end to the conflict. France believes that Jerusalem must become the capital of the two States." France does not recognize Israel's sovereignty over East Jerusalem, which France considers an "occupied territory under the Fourth Geneva Convention".

=== Russia ===
On 6 April 2017 the Russian Ministry of Foreign Affairs issued a statement saying, "We reaffirm our commitment to the UN-approved principles for a Palestinian–Israeli settlement, which include the status of East Jerusalem as the capital of the future Palestinian state. At the same time, we must state that in this context we view West Jerusalem as the capital of Israel." Some commentators interpreted this as a Russian recognition of Israel's claim to West Jerusalem, while others understood the statement as a Russian intention to recognize West Jerusalem as Israel's in the context of a peace deal with the Palestinians. On 14 June 2018, Russia held, for the first time, its annual Russia Day reception in Jerusalem. Until then, the annual reception has been held in the Tel Aviv area. Although Russia has publicly recognised West Jerusalem as the capital of Israel, it continues to locate its embassy in Tel Aviv. Prior to these events, in 2011 the Russian President Dmitry Medvedev stated that Russia had recognized the State of Palestine with East Jerusalem as its capital already in 1988, and that it had not changed its view.

In January 2011, reaffirming Russia's recognition of the State of Palestine, President Dmitry Medvedev said Russia "supported and will support the inalienable right of the Palestinian people to an independent state with its capital in East Jerusalem."

=== United Kingdom ===
The United Kingdom position on Jerusalem states that "Jerusalem was supposed to be a ‘corpus separatum’, or international city administered by the UN. But this was never set up: immediately after the UNGA resolution partitioning Palestine, Israel occupied West Jerusalem and Jordan occupied East Jerusalem (including the Old City). We recognised the de facto control of Israel and Jordan, but not sovereignty. In 1967, Israel occupied E Jerusalem, which we continue to consider is under illegal military occupation by Israel. Our Embassy to Israel is in Tel Aviv, not Jerusalem. In E Jerusalem we have a Consulate-General, with a Consul-General who is not accredited to any state: this is an expression of our view that no state has sovereignty over Jerusalem."

The UK believes that the city's status has yet to be determined, and maintains that it should be settled in an overall agreement between the parties concerned, but considers that the city should not again be divided. The Declaration of Principles and the Interim Agreement, signed by Israel and the PLO on 13 September 1993 and 28 September 1995 respectively, left the issue of the status of Jerusalem to be decided in the "permanent status" negotiations between the two parties.

=== United States ===
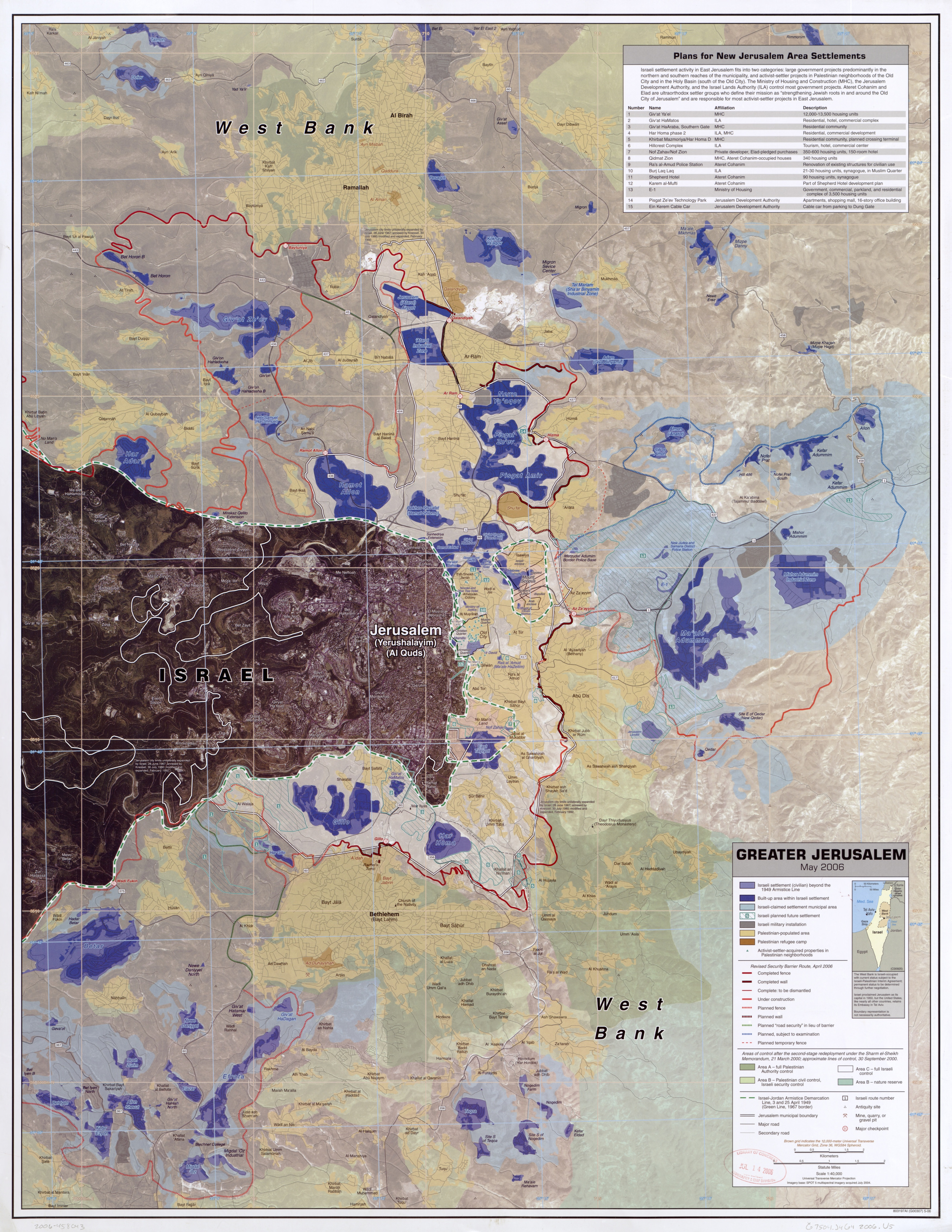
Greater Jerusalem, May 2006. CIA remote sensing map showing refugee camps, fences, walls, and settlements.

When Israel was founded, the position of the United States was that its recognition of Israel did not imply a particular view on the status of Jerusalem. The U.S. voted for the UN Partition Plan in November 1947, which provided for the establishment of an international regime for the city, and Resolution 194 in 1948, following the 1948 Arab–Israeli War. But the U.S. voted against Resolution 303 in 1949 which reaffirmed that Jerusalem be established a corpus separatum under a special international regime to be administered by the UN, because the U.S. regarded the plan as no longer feasible after both Israel and Jordan had established a political presence in the city. The U.S. position continues to be that final status of Jerusalem is to be resolved through negotiations. On 8 December 2017, Secretary of State Rex Tillerson clarified that the president's statement "did not indicate any final status for Jerusalem" and "was very clear that the final status, including the borders, would be left to the two parties to negotiate and decide."

On 6 December 2017, U.S. President Donald Trump announced that the U.S. would recognize Jerusalem as the capital of Israel. On 14 May 2018 the U.S. embassy was transferred from Tel Aviv to Jerusalem. The U.S. reclassified as its embassy its Jerusalem Consulate, which had been a lot in the neighborhood of Talpiot leased in 1989 for 99 years by the Israeli government and relocated there in 2002. From 28 October 2020, for the first time, U.S. citizens born in Jerusalem will be allowed to list "Israel" as their place of birth on their U.S. passport, while retaining the option to list simply "Jerusalem" instead.

The Biden Administration referred to Israeli residents of East Jerusalem as "settlers". When U.S. President Joe Biden visited Israel and Palestine in 2022, his delegation removed the Israeli flags from his vehicle upon entering East Jerusalem, in a move widely interpreted as signaling non-recognition of Israeli sovereignty over East Jerusalem.

=== Other G20 countries ===
- Argentina: The Argentine government considered Jerusalem as a city of special status until the administration of President Javier Milei, a staunch supporter of the State of Israel. The issue of moving the embassy from Tel Aviv to Jerusalem was one of Milei's promised foreign policy decisions during his presidential campaign. After his inauguration, Milei met with Israeli Prime Minister Benjamin Netanyahu and reiterated his commitment to move the Argentine embassy to Jerusalem. The outbreak of the Gaza war postponed Milei's plans and, in January 2026, it was reported that the government had paused its plans. However, after the outbreak of the 2026 Iran war, Milei took a strong position supporting Israel and the United States. Condemning Iran's sponsor of terrorism and blaming the Iranian government for the 1992 Buenos Aires Israeli embassy bombing and the AMIA bombing, Milei reactivated his plans to move the embassy, confirming on 16 April 2026 in an interview with Israeli media that he intended to officialize the decision during his third visit to Israel in April 2026.
- Australia: On 15 December 2018 Prime Minister Scott Morrison announced that Australia recognised West Jerusalem as the capital of Israel, while East Jerusalem should be the capital of the State of Palestine. However, Morrison also announced that Australia would not relocate its embassy to West Jerusalem until after the final status of Jerusalem was resolved. On 17 October 2022, Australia's foreign minister confirmed its reversal of the previous governments recognition of West Jerusalem as Israel's capital. The decision was harshly criticised by Opposition Leader Peter Dutton. However, Australia still maintains close relations with Israel and currently has no formal relations with Palestine.
- Brazil: Brazil recognizes East Jerusalem as the capital of the State of Palestine, with which it maintains full diplomatic relations, whereas the Brazilian embassy to Israel is based in Tel Aviv.
- Canada: According to Global Affairs Canada, "Canada considers the status of Jerusalem can be resolved only as part of a general settlement of the Palestinian–Israeli dispute. Canada does not recognize Israel's unilateral annexation of East Jerusalem." In the fact sheet on Israel displayed on the Canadian Foreign Affairs Department's website, the "Capital" field states that "While Israel designates Jerusalem as its capital, Canada believes that the final status of the city needs to be negotiated between the Israelis and Palestinians. At present, Canada maintains its Embassy in Tel Aviv."
- Germany: According to Germany's Foreign Minister Sigmar Gabriel, Germany is committed to a two-state solution and believes that the final status of Jerusalem must be resolved through negotiations between the Israelis and Palestinians.
- Italy: "Endorsing the stance of the European Union in this regard, Italy does not recognise the legitimacy of any border changes that are not agreed between the parties. The question of Jerusalem is extremely sensitive, being the home to the Holy Places belonging to the three great monotheistic religions. To resolve this issue it will be necessary for the parties to reach a difficult, but possible, agreement to safeguard the special character of the city and meet the expectations of both peoples."
- Japan: In a 1980 statement to the United Nations, Japan criticized Israel's proclamation of Jerusalem as its united capital: "Japan cannot recognize such a unilateral change to the legal status of an occupied territory, which is in total violation of the relevant United Nations resolutions". Japan later reiterated its position in a 2001 UN report: "Japan believes that issues relating to Jerusalem should be resolved through the permanent status negotiations between the parties concerned, and until such a solution is achieved both parties should refrain from taking any unilateral action relating to the situation in Jerusalem."
- Saudi Arabia: Saudi Arabia recognizes the State of Palestine, with East Jerusalem as its capital. Saudi Arabia does not formally recognize the State of Israel. The Saudi monarchy has not taken an official position on the fate of West Jerusalem's status. Saudi Arabia expressed disappointment in the United States's recognition of Jerusalem as Israel's capital.
- South Korea: South Korean Ministry of Foreign Affairs introduces Israel's capital as Jerusalem, but mentions that there is controversy over its status. However, the South Korean Embassy in Israel is in Herzliya.
- Turkey: On 17 December 2017, Turkey's President Recep Tayyip Erdoğan said "the day is close when officially" his nation will open an embassy to the State of Palestine in East Jerusalem. This statement came several days after Erdoğan had called for worldwide recognition of East Jerusalem as the occupied capital of a Palestinian state at a summit of Muslim countries convened in response to the U.S. recognition of Jerusalem as Israel's capital.

=== Other countries ===
- Afghanistan: Both the Taliban and the previous Islamic Republic of Afghanistan recognized Jerusalem as the capital of Palestine. While the previous government maintained a more diplomatic position regarding the status of Jerusalem, stating its deference to international law, the Taliban has expressed open support for Jerusalem as a Palestinian capital.
- Chile: The Chilean government considers Jerusalem to be a city with special status, whose final sovereignty must be decided by both Israel and Palestine. It also considers Israel's occupation and control over East Jerusalem illegal. Chile maintains its embassy to Israel in Tel Aviv, while its representative office to the State of Palestine is located in Ramallah.
- Colombia: In October 2026, Colombia opened an Israeli embassy in Jerusalem.
- Republic of China (Taiwan): According to a 7 December 2017 announcement by Taiwan's Ministry of Foreign Affairs (MOFA), Taiwan considers Jerusalem to be the capital of Israel, but has no plans of moving its representative office to the city in the wake of Donald Trump's formal recognition of it as Israel's capital. Although Jerusalem is listed as the capital of Israel on MOFA's website, the ministry notes that its status as such "has not been widely recognized by the international community" and remains highly controversial.
- Czech Republic: In May 2017, the Chamber of Deputies of the Czech Parliament rejected a UNESCO resolution that criticized Israel for its excavations in East Jerusalem. The Chamber declared that the Czech government "should advocate a position respecting Jerusalem as the Israeli capital city" and called on the government to withhold its annual funding of UNESCO. On 6 December 2017, following the recognition statement by the United States, the Czech Foreign Ministry acknowledged that Jerusalem is "in practice the capital of Israel in the borders of the demarcation line from 1967", but said the Czech government, in line the positions of other EU member states, considers the city to be the future capital of both Israel and Palestine. The Ministry also said it would consider moving the Czech embassy from Tel Aviv to Jerusalem "only based on results of negotiations with key partners in the region and in the world." In May 2018, Czech Republic reopened its honorary consulate in Jerusalem. On 11 March 2021, the Czech Republic opened a branch of its embassy in Jerusalem.
- Denmark: "Israel has declared Jerusalem to be its capital. Due to the conflict and unclear situation concerning the city's status, foreign embassies are in Tel Aviv."
- Fiji: In December 2022, following negotiations between three political parties (the People's Alliance, the National Federation Party and SODELPA) seeking to form a coalition government following the 2022 election, it was agreed upon that Fiji would open an embassy in Jerusalem, which was a condition for SODELPA joining the coalition. The Fijian government opened its embassy in Jerusalem on 17 September 2025.
- Finland: The Finnish embassy to Israel is in Tel Aviv; Finland refers to East Jerusalem as part of the "occupied Palestinian territory", and it understands that East Jerusalem "will be the capital" of the Palestinian state.
- Guatemala: On 16 May 2018, Guatemala reopened its embassy in Jerusalem, the second country to do so.
- Honduras: On 24 June 2021, Honduras opened its embassy in Jerusalem, the third country to do so.
- Iran: On 27 December 2017, the Iranian parliament voted in favor of a bill recognizing Jerusalem as the capital of Palestine in response to the United States decision to recognize the city as Israel's capital.
- Moldova: In December 2018, following his state visit to Israel, Moldovan President Igor Dodon said that he and his administration are considering the possibility of moving the Moldovan embassy from Tel Aviv to Jerusalem, probably in the hope to win support from the U.S. for his embattled government. In June 2019, Prime Minister Pavel Filip announced that the decision to move of the Moldovan embassy to Jerusalem has now been taken by his government-one that has been described as "lame-duck" due to a constitutional crisis, with a second, counter-government in place that is opposed to the move, and which is recognised by Russia, the U.S. and the EU. For this reason, the announcement was flatly ignored by the Israeli government. The Filip government has also adopted the decision to sell to the U.S. the plot of land needed for the construction of the new American embassy in Jerusalem.
- Nauru: On 29 August 2019, Nauru officially recognized all of Jerusalem as the state capital of Israel. The country opened its Israeli embassy in Jerusalem on 7 September 2026.
- Netherlands: Following a general election, a new governing coalition agreed in May 2024 "to investigate when a move of the embassy to Jerusalem [...] could take place."
- Norway: In 2010, the Norwegian Foreign Ministry stated "Norway considers the Israeli presence in East Jerusalem to be in violation of international law, as does the entire international community."
- Oman: Oman does not recognize the State of Israel, and has stated that it will refuse to normalize relations with Israel until a sovereign and independent Palestinian state is established. As such, the country claims united Jerusalem as the capital of Palestine and does not have an embassy in Israel.
- Pakistan: Pakistan has refused to recognize Israel until an "adequate and fair" independent sovereign state for the Palestinians is established, specifically the State of Palestine with its pre-1967 borders and united Jerusalem as its capital.
- Papua New Guinea: Papua New Guinea opened its embassy in Jerusalem on September 5, 2023, after announcing plans to do so earlier in the year.
- Paraguay: Paraguay moved its embassy to Jerusalem in May 2018, but following a change in government, on 6 September 2018, Paraguay announced that its embassy would be relocated to Tel Aviv. This move was due to President Mario Abdo Benítez's disagreement over the embassy relocation. According to President Santiago Peña in September 2023, Paraguay currently plans to relocate its embassy from Tel Aviv to Jerusalem for a second time on November of that year. The embassy was effectively relocated to Jerusalem in December 2024.
- Philippines: On 6 December 2017, following the recognition statement by the United States, President Rodrigo Duterte expressed interest in relocating the embassy of the Philippines from Tel Aviv to Jerusalem and reportedly contacted the Foreign Ministry of Israel to discuss the plans. However, the Philippines' Department of Foreign Affairs later mentioned that it does not support Trump's statement to recognize Jerusalem as Israel's capital and expressed its support for a two-state solution.
- Romania: In April 2018, Prime Minister Viorica Dăncilă announced that the Government has adopted a memorandum regarding the initiation of procedures to relocate the Romanian embassy from Tel Aviv to Jerusalem. President Klaus Iohannis, who had not been informed about this decision, accused the Premier of violating the Constitution, while emphasizing "the need for a just and lasting settlement of the Israeli-Palestinian conflict by implementing the two-state solution."
- Saint Vincent and the Grenadines: "St Vincent and the Grenadines strongly urges the United States of America to acknowledge that any unilateral declaration on its part regarding the status of Jerusalem will not in any way advance the cause of a just, peaceful and lasting solution to the dispute between the peoples of Israel and Palestine".
- Serbia: On 4 September 2020, following a breakthrough U.S.-led agreement with Kosovo (and Israel), Serbia agreed to recognize united Jerusalem as the capital of Israel and relocate its embassy from Tel Aviv to Jerusalem by June 2021. On 9 September 2020, The Jerusalem Post quoted an unnamed source from the Serbian president's office who stated that Serbia would not move its embassy to Jerusalem as it pledged to do by signing the White House Agreement if Israel recognizes Kosovo as an independent state.
- Singapore: In a 7 December 2017 statement, Singapore's Ministry of Foreign Affairs reaffirmed the country's support for a two-state solution where the final status of Jerusalem would be "decided through direct negotiations between Israel and the Palestinians."
- Slovakia: "Slovakia is on its way to relocating its embassy to Jerusalem," the head of the Slovak National Council Andrej Danko said on 4 July 2018 in a meeting with the president of Israel. A date for the relocation has not been provided, but Slovakia will first open an honorary consulate in the city.
- Somaliland: On 19 May 2026, a Somaliland government official confirmed that the country will open an embassy in Jerusalem to strengthen ties with Israel. In response, Israel, which is the only country to date to recognize Somaliland's independence, will reciprocate by opening an embassy in Hargeisa. The embassy was officially inaugurated on 15 June 2026 with Somaliland president Abdirahman Mohamed Abdullahi present at the ceremony.
- Suriname: Surinamese Foreign Minister Albert Ramdin announced in 2022 that Suriname intends to open an embassy in Jerusalem. The status of this decision was shortly after contradicted in parliament by Vice President Ronnie Brunswijk.
- Sweden: "Sweden, like other states, does not recognise Jerusalem as Israel's capital, which is why the embassy is in Tel Aviv."
- Vanuatu: The Republic of Vanuatu recognized Jerusalem as the capital of Israel in June 2017. Vanuatu President Baldwin Lonsdale issued the recognition in response to a controversial UNESCO resolution passed in October 2016 that, according to the Israeli government, downplays Jewish connection to the Temple Mount.
- Venezuela: In 2018, the Venezuelan government affirmed the support for Palestinian cause by declaring its stance to recognize Jerusalem as the eternal capital of Palestine after the U.S. embassy move to Jerusalem, which it called as an "extremist decision" that lacks legal validity and violates international law. During the Venezuelan presidential crisis, Interim President Juan Guaidó vowed to place his country's embassy in Jerusalem if he had assumed power from Nicolas Maduro.

== Islamic holy sites ==
The status of Islamic holy sites in Jerusalem, including Haram Al-Sharif/Temple Mount, is also unresolved. In 1924, the Supreme Muslim Council, the highest Muslim body in charge of Muslim community affairs in Mandatory Palestine, accepted Hussein bin Ali (Sharif of Mecca) as custodian of Al-Aqsa.

In the 1994 peace treaty with Jordan, Israel committed to "respect the present special role of the Hashemite Kingdom of Jordan in Muslim Holy shrines in Jerusalem." Israel also pledged that when negotiations on the permanent status will take place, it will give high priority to the Jordanian historical role in these shrines. The Wakf Department that oversees Muslim sites in Jerusalem is controlled by the Jordanian government, which insists on its exclusive custodianship of the holy site. In 2013, the Palestinian Authority also recognized Jordan's role through an agreement signed between PA President Mahmoud Abbas and King Abdullah II.

== Position of the Vatican ==
The Vatican has had a long-held position on Jerusalem and its concern for the protection of the Christian holy places in the Holy Land which predates the Palestinian Mandate. The Vatican's historic claims and interests, as well as those of Italy and France were based on the former Protectorate of the Holy See and the French Protectorate of Jerusalem, which were incorporated in article 95 of the Treaty of Sèvres (1920), which besides incorporating the Balfour Declaration also provided: "it being clearly understood that nothing shall be done which may prejudice the civil and religious rights of existing non-Jewish communities in Palestine". The Balfour Declaration and the proviso were also incorporated in the Palestinian Mandate (1923), but which also provided in articles 13 and 14 for an international commission to resolve competing claims on the holy places. These claimants had officially lost all capitulation rights by article 28 of the Treaty of Lausanne (1923). However, Britain never gave any effect to Mandate provisions arts 13 & 14.

During the negotiations of proposals that culminated in the United Nations Partition Plan for Palestine (also known as Resolution 181) in 1947, the historic claims of the Vatican, Italy and France were revived, and expressed as the call for the special international regime for the city of Jerusalem. This was also confirmed in UN General Assembly Resolution 194 in 1948, which maintained the position that Jerusalem be made an international city, under United Nations supervision. The Vatican's official position on the status of Jerusalem was in favour of an internationalization of Jerusalem, in order to keep the holy place away from either Israeli or Arab sovereignty.

Pope Pius XII supported this idea in the 1949 encyclical Redemptoris nostri cruciatus. It was proposed again during the papacies of John XXIII, Paul VI, John Paul II and Benedict XVI. The Vatican reiterated this position in 2012, recognizing Jerusalem's "identity and sacred character" and calling for freedom of access to the city's holy places to be protected by "an internationally guaranteed special statute". After the U.S. recognized Jerusalem as Israel's capital in December 2017, Pope Francis repeated the Vatican's position: "I wish to make a heartfelt appeal to ensure that everyone is committed to respecting the status quo of the city, in accordance with the relevant resolutions of the United Nations."

== French claims in Jerusalem ==
There are four sites in Jerusalem claimed by France under a national domain (Domaine national français), which are based on claimed French acquisitions predating the formation of the State of Israel, and based on the former French Protectorate of Jerusalem (also known as capitulations), which was abolished in 1923. These sites are:

- Church of the Pater Noster, also known as the Sanctuary of the Eleona
- Benedictine monastery in Abu Ghosh
- Tombs of the Kings
- Church of Saint Anne

French presidents have claimed that the Church of Saint Anne in Jerusalem, for example, comes under French protection, is owned by its government, and is French territory. The Israeli government has not made any public statement relating to the French claims.

== See also ==
- Foreign relations of Israel
- Green Line (Israel)
- International recognition of the State of Palestine
- Status of territories occupied by Israel in 1967
