= Pope John XXIII and Judaism =

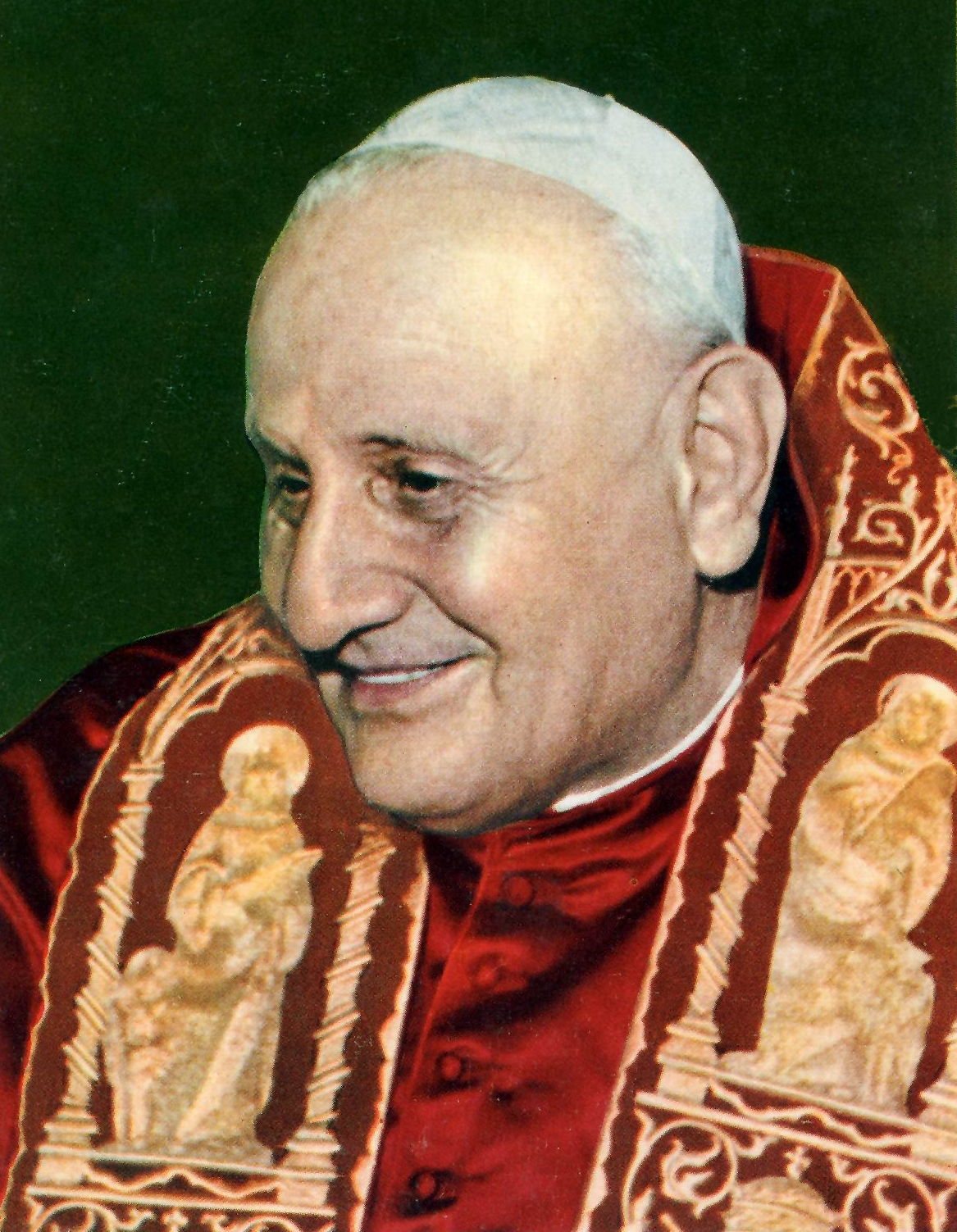
Pope John XXIII in 1959

The relations between Pope John XXIII and Judaism are generally thought to have been among the best in the bi-millennial history of Christianity. The Pope initiated a policy of Christian–Jewish reconciliation after his election to the papacy in 1959, which focused on the Second Vatican Council producing a document on the relationship between the Catholic Church and the Jews. During his earlier career in the diplomatic service, especially during World War II, he had taken a series of actions that demonstrated his solidarity with victims of anti-Semitism.

== Diplomatic career ==
Before becoming pope, Angelo Roncalli, later John XXIII, held a series of posts in the diplomatic service of the Holy See, including stints in Bulgaria from 1925 to 1934, Apostolic Delegate to both Greece and Turkey from 1934 to 1944, and ending as nuncio to France from 1944 to 1953. The extent to which he acted independently or at the direction of the Vatican is disputed, a question that plays a part in the debate over the role of Pope Pius XII during the Holocaust. He at times relayed information and at other times intervened.

For his actions during the 1930s and 1940s, in 2011 the International Raoul Wallenberg Foundation petitioned the Yad Vashem museum to recognize Roncalli as one of the "Righteous Among the Nations", an honor reserved for non-Jews who helped Jews during the Holocaust.

=== Hungary ===
According to the Raoul Wallenberg Foundation, Roncalli forwarded a request for the Vatican to inquire whether other neutral countries could grant asylum to Jews, to inform the German government that the Palestine Jewish Agency had 5,000 immigration certificates available and to ask Vatican Radio to broadcast that helping Jews was an act of mercy approved by the Church. In 1944, Roncalli used diplomatic couriers, papal representatives and the Sisters of Our Lady of Zion to transport and issue baptismal certificates, immigration certificates and visas, many of them forged, to Hungarian Jews. A dispatch dated 16 August 1944 from Roncalli to the papal nuncio to Hungary illustrates the intensity of "Operation Baptism".

=== Romania ===
In February 1944, Roncalli met twice with Rabbi Isaac Herzog (Yitzhak HaLevi Herzog), chief rabbi of Jerusalem. Herzog asked him to intercede for 55,000 Jews interned in Romania, another Axis ally. Though Roncalli notified Rome, only 750 Jewish refugees – 250 of them orphans – were saved when their ship arrived in Palestine.

=== Slovakia and Bulgaria ===
With the help of Boris III of Bulgaria, a reluctant Axis ally, Roncalli used the Red Cross to save thousands of Slovak Jews who had been deported to Bulgaria.

=== France ===
As Nuncio for France, Roncalli ignored a directive not to return baptized Jewish orphans to their parents.

== Papacy ==
Pope John XXIII, made several gestures to demonstrate his sympathetic feelings for the Jewish community. He sent a message to the Chief Rabbi of Israel announcing his election, even though the Holy See did not recognize the State of Israel. On 17 October 1960, he met with a delegation of 130 American Jews associated with the United Jewish Appeal. He greeted them with words from the Bible "I am Joseph your brother" to establish that he and they were starting a new relationship despite what may have passed between Catholics and Jews before, as Joseph reconciled with his brothers in Book of Genesis. On 17 March 1962, he stopped his car when he saw people exiting the synagogue in Rome and blessed them in the morning. A rabbi described the scene: "after a moment of understandable bewilderment, the Jews surrounded him and applauded him enthusiastically. It was in fact the first time in history that a pope had blessed Jews and it was perhaps the first real gesture of reconciliation".

=== Good Friday Prayer for the Jews ===
In 1959, Pope John XXIII removed the Latin word (Latin: perfidis) from the prayer for the conversion of the Jews in the Good Friday liturgy. This word had long been an object of complaint as it was commonly translated with the cognate "perfidious", expressing contempt for the Jews even as the Church prayed for their conversion, and the Vatican in the late 1940s under Pope Pius XII had advised that the word was more correctly translated as "faithless" or "non-believing".

The prayer was revised to read:

Let us pray also for the Jews: that almighty God may remove the veil from their hearts; so that they too may acknowledge Jesus Christ our Lord. Let us pray. [Let us kneel. Arise.] Almighty and eternal God, who dost also not exclude from thy mercy the Jews: hear our prayers, which we offer for the blindness of that people; that acknowledging the light of thy Truth, which is Christ, they may be delivered from their darkness. Through the same our Lord Jesus Christ, who liveth and reigneth with thee in the unity of the Holy Spirit, God, for ever and ever. Amen.

John XXIII demonstrated his commitment to the change in language during the Good Friday service in St. Peter's Basilica in April 1963. When the canon reciting the eight prayers included the word "perfidis" during the Prayer for the Jews, the seventh prayer, the Pope signaled for the liturgy to stop and then had the sequence of prayers repeated from the beginning with the word omitted.

In a related action, Pope John in 1960 modified the language used in baptizing adults, removing the warning against returning to one's earlier religious faith, with texts available for a pagan, Muslim, Jew, and heretical Christian. In the case of a Jewish convert the text was: "You should abhor Hebrew perfidy and reject Hebrew superstition." The modification was made because Pope John wanted "to emphasize everything that unites and to remove anything that unduly divides believers in God".

=== Nostra aetate ===
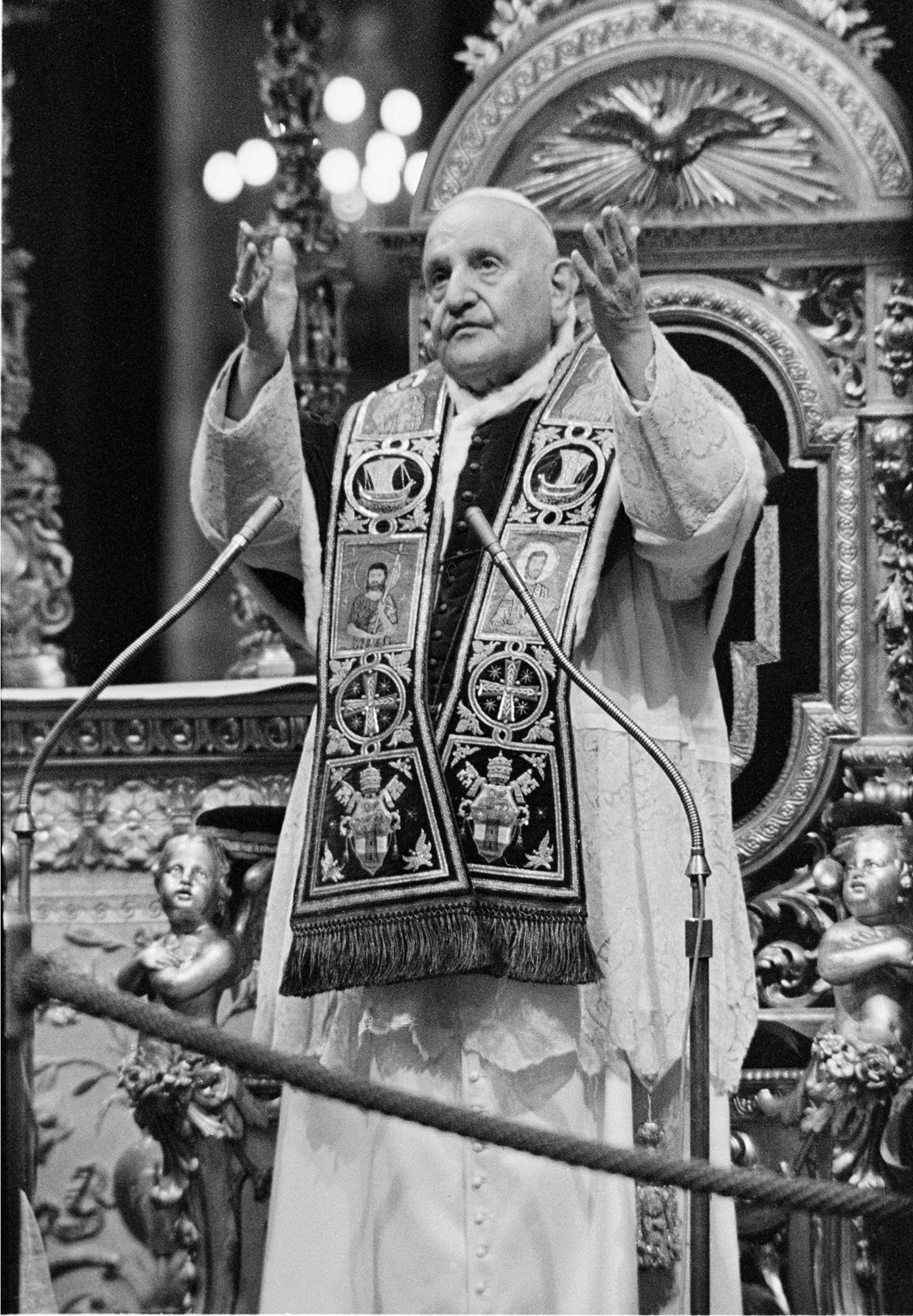
John XXIII during the closing ceremony of the first phase of the Second Vatican Council, December 1962

Marc H. Tanenbaum's work in the field of Jewish-Christian relations was galvanized when Pope John XXIII called for a revitalization of the Catholic Church in the form of the Ecumenical Council in 1961. At the time, Rabbi Tanenbaum was Director of Interreligious Affairs at the American Jewish Committee. He supervised an initiative which addressed the negative portrayal of Judaism in Catholic textbooks and in the liturgy. It included concrete steps to alleviate tensions and reduce prejudice. He worked alongside Jewish philanthropist Angelo Donati in this endeavor.

In 1962, when Pope John XXIII convened the Second Vatican Council, Cardinal Augustin Bea used Dr. Rose Thering's study to draft portions of the 1965 Vatican document Nostra aetate ("In Our Age"), which declared of Christ's death: "what happened in his passion cannot be charged against all the Jews, without distinction, then alive, nor against the Jews of today". He further added that "the Jews should not be presented as rejected or accursed by God."

Decretum de Iudaeis or "Decree on the Jews", was the working name given to the series of draft documents of the Second Vatican Council which led to groundbreaking progress in the Church's relations with Jews. Cardinal Bea had been commissioned by Pope John XXIII to write the "Decree on the Jews", which was completed in November 1961. The first draft document essentially went nowhere, never having been submitted to the Council, which opened on 11 October 1962.

Nostra aetate is the Second Vatican Council's document on interfaith relations. Passed by a vote of 2,221 to 88 of the assembled bishops, it was promulgated on 28 October 1965, by Pope Paul VI. Although John XXIII had already died when the statement was passed, it is generally thought to be strongly influenced by the late Pope's teachings.

=== Relations with Israel ===
Although Pope John XXIII was generally popular with Jews, he did not publicly recognize the State of Israel, essentially because of issues surrounding Church properties and support for post-1948 refugees, as explained in the document In multiplicibus curis. His encyclical Pacem in terris has at times been re-evaluated in the context of the Israeli-Palestinian conflict.

John XXIII positive attitude was the cause of gratitude among the Jewish people: the Chief Rabbi (rishon le'zion) Yitzhak Nissim spoke in mourning of the deceased Pontiff, defining his death as a "A loss that saddens all those who seek peace and human love".

== See also ==
- Pope Benedict XV and Judaism
- Pope Pius XI and Judaism
- Pope Pius XII and Judaism
