= International city =

Fully or semi-autonomous city-state which is not governed by any one nation-state

An international city is an autonomous or semi-autonomous city-state that is separate from the direct supervision of any single nation-state.

== Rationale for establishment ==
International cities have had either one or both of the following characteristics:

- they were ethnically mixed;
- authority over the city had previously been contested by different nation-states.

International cities were established mainly in the 1920s and 1940s, following World War I and World War II.

== Instruments of state and governance ==
For a period in the early 19th century, the Free City of Cracow had a measure of autonomy outside of the Austrian Empire, the Kingdom of Prussia and Imperial Russia, and was tariff-free.

Some international cities, such as the Free City of Danzig and the Free Territory of Trieste, had their own currency and practised tariff-free trade.

These international cities had limited self-governance (as in Danzig, with supervision from the League of Nations), or were administered by a body of representatives from external nation-states (as in Shanghai, from 1845 to 1944; and the International Zone of Tangier, from 1923 to 1957).

== Status of Jerusalem ==
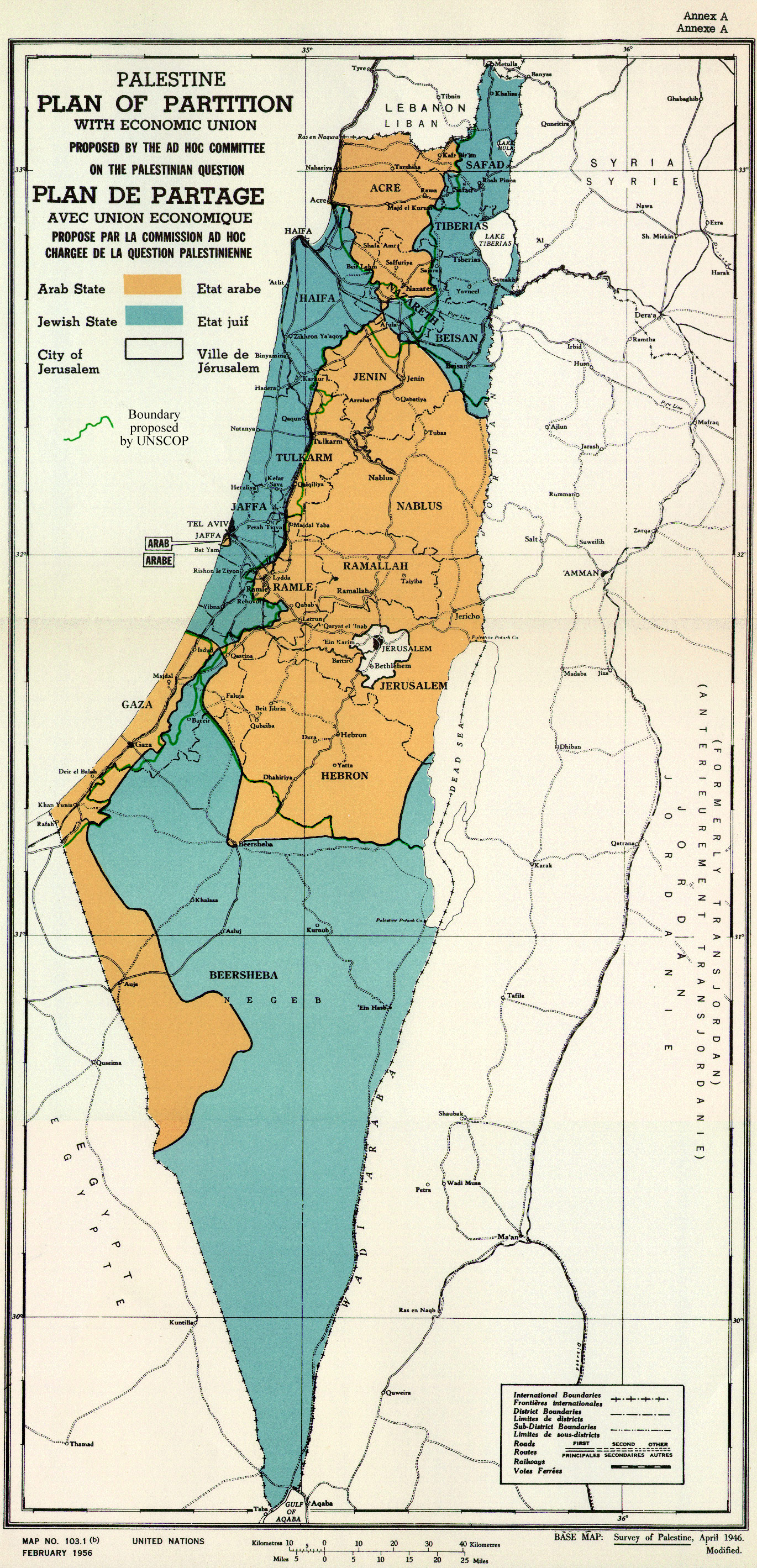
1947 plan for the partition of Palestine; Jerusalem is shaded white as a city under a "Special International Regime."

The Holy See has had a long-held position on Jerusalem and the protection of the holy places in the Holy Land which predates the British Mandate for Palestine. The Vatican's historic claims and interests, as well as those of Italy and France were based on the former Protectorate of the Holy See and the French Protectorate of Jerusalem, which were incorporated in article 95 of the Treaty of Sèvres (1920), which incorporated the Balfour Declaration, but also provided: “it being clearly understood that nothing shall be done which may prejudice the civil and religious rights of existing non-Jewish communities in Palestine“. The Balfour Declaration and the proviso were also incorporated in the Palestinian Mandate (1923), but which also provided in articles 13 and 14 for an international commission to resolve competing claims on the holy places. These claimants had officially lost all capitulation rights by article 28 of the Treaty of Lausanne (1923). However, Britain never gave any effect to Mandate provisions arts 13 & 14. During the drafting of proposals that culminated in the United Nations Partition Plan for Palestine (also known as Resolution 181) in 1947, the historic claims of the Vatican, Italy and France were revived, and expressed as the call for the special international regime for the city of Jerusalem. This was also confirmed in UN General Assembly Resolution 194 in 1948, which maintained the position that Jerusalem be made an international city, under United Nations supervision.

Pope Pius XII supported this idea in the 1949 encyclical Redemptoris nostri cruciatus. It was proposed again during the papacies of John XXIII, Paul VI, John Paul II and Benedict XVI. The Vatican reiterated this position in 2012, recognizing Jerusalem's "identity and sacred character" and calling for freedom of access to the city's holy places to be protected by "an internationally guaranteed special statute". After the US recognized Jerusalem as Israel's capital in December 2017, Pope Francis repeated the Vatican’s position: "I wish to make a heartfelt appeal to ensure that everyone is committed to respecting the status quo of the city, in accordance with the relevant resolutions of the United Nations."

== Examples ==
- (Free City of Danzig) Danzig (1920–1939), semi-independent zone between Germany and Poland administered by the League of Nations and in a customs union with Poland. Annexed by Nazi Germany after the German invasion of Poland at the beginning of World War II, and then by Poland after the war.
- (Free State of Fiume) Fiume (1920–1924), contested by Italy and the Kingdom of Serbs, Croats and Slovenes. Divided between the two by the Treaty of Rome.
- Krakow (1815–1846), a protectorate of Austria, Prussia and Russia created at the Congress of Vienna after the Napoleonic Wars. Annexed by Austria after the Kraków uprising.
- Tangier (1925–1956), extraterritorial zone within Spanish Morocco administered by Spain, France, the United Kingdom and others. Integrated into the independent Kingdom of Morocco in 1956.
- Trieste (1947–1954), independent territory between Italy and Yugoslavia administered by the United Nations Security Council. Partitioned between Italy and Yugoslavia.
- Shanghai (1863–1943), extraterritorial zone of various international concessions under Chinese sovereignty established in Shanghai by the Unequal Treaties. Fully reintegrated into China during World War II.
- Beijing, extraterritorial zone of various international concessions under Chinese sovereignty established in Beijing after the Boxer Rebellion. Abolished after the Second Sino-Japanese War and the Chinese Civil War.
- Gulangyu Island (1902–1943), extraterritorial zone of various international concessions under Chinese sovereignty established in Xiamen by the Treaty of Nanking. Abolished after the Second Sino-Japanese War.
- Memel (1920–1923), a League of Nations protectorate established by the Treaty of Versailles between Germany and Lithuania, annexed by Lithuania after the Klaipėda Revolt.
- Saar Basin (1920–1935), a League of Nations mandate established by the Treaty of Versailles between France and Germany. Fully integrated into Nazi Germany after the 1935 Saar status referendum.
- West Berlin (1948–1990), an enclave of the Western Allied occupation zones of Berlin within East Germany. Ceased to exist after German reunification.
- Headquarters of the United Nations, extraterritorial complex containing the headquarters of the principal organs of the United Nations within New York City in the United States

== Similar concepts ==
International cities may be essentially a form of condominium, a territory where ultimate sovereignty is jointly held by more than one state. In the case of international cities, the sovereignty might lie with one or more foreign states, or with an international body such as the League of Nations or United Nations.

== See also ==
- Corpus separatum
- Global city
