= Council of Christians and Jews =

UK voluntary association

The Council of Christians and Jews (CCJ) is a voluntary organisation in the United Kingdom. It is composed of Christians and Jews working together to counter anti-semitism and other forms of intolerance in Britain. Their patron Queen Elizabeth II was succeeded by King Charles III.

The CCJ was founded, in 1942, by Chief Rabbi Joseph H. Hertz and Archbishop William Temple during a time of all-out warfare and Nazi persecution of Jews. In late 1954, and reflecting the theology of the era, the Vatican instructed the head of English Catholics to resign from the CCJ due to its perceived indifferentism, with Catholics not returning until the reforms introduced by the Second Vatican Council.

== Background ==
Prior to the foundation of the Council of Christians and Jews a number of initiatives had already taken place. The London Society for the Study of Religions, founded in 1904, included Jews in its membership. In 1924 the Presbyterian Church of England General Assembly agreed to form a sub committee to discuss the lack of understanding between Jews and Christians. The committee wished to abandon proselytising and instead promote cooperative methods of action.

In 1925 Herbert Lowe, a Jewish Cambridge scholar, addressed the General Assembly for the first time.

"The love of God and love of man are the foundations of our faith and of yours. We have a vast heritage in common...We recognise that we are put on earth to serve each other...When we consider the framework on which our creeds are built the wonder is not that our views of life are similar, but that we should have been so long in discovering the similarity, the wonder is that centuries of ignorance and hatred should have intervened between us..I am convinced that our partnership in the fight against oppression and injustice and race-hatred can be successful, and our efforts can never be blessed until we learn to respect the standpoint of each other."

In 1924 the Social Service Committee of the Liberal Jewish Synagogue convened a meeting for Jews and Christians to confer together on the basis of their common ideals and with mutual respect for differences of belief'. From this developed the Society of Jews and Christians in 1927 that provided a platform for a number of notable speakers. The inter war years was marked by a reappraisal by Christian scholars of Jewish religion. In 1930 James Parkes published 'The Jew and his neighbour', setting out the causes of anti-Semitism and its Christian roots. Parkes would later be placed on Hitler's list of those he wanted killed.

With the rise of Nazi anti-Semitism a few Christians did speak out. In 1934 The General Assembly of the Church of Scotland noted the 'age-long sufferings of the Jewish people' and that during 'the present outbreaks of anti-Semitic fanaticism', declared its 'heart-felt sympathy for the Jewish people' and deplored their present treatment as being 'abhorrent'.

A Youth Council on Jewish-Christian Relations was formed in 1934 that included several Christian organisations and by 1940 also included Jewish groups. By the middle of the decade various groups made up of Jews and Christians were involved in giving aid to Jewish refugees from Germany, whose number rose sharply after Kristallnacht. The Refugee Children's Movement took care to ensure that whenever a Jewish child was placed in a Christian home the child would not be subject to proselytisation and that contact was established with the nearest Rabbi.

Anglican, Free church and Roman Catholic Churches came together in 1938 to form a Christian Council for Refugees following the passing of the Nuremberg Decrees. The council's secretary was W. W. Simpson, a Methodist minister, who would dedicate his life to the improvement of Christian-Jewish relations. His 1939 pamphlet 'The Christian and the Jewish Problem' recognised the part of Christianity in Jewish suffering, involving factors such deicide, the Crusades, the ghettos, the Inquisition and their influence on present day persecution.

== Formation ==
Out of the diverse groups that marked Jewish-Christian dialogue and aid during the 1930s a proposal was circulated with a view to forming an organization built on a national network. The Archbishop of York, William Temple, invited leaders of various communities to discuss these proposals in 1941. Temple outlined the mission of what was to become the Council of Christians and Jews. The Council would work against all forms of discrimination and promote the 'fundamental ethical teachings which are common to Judaism and Christianity' The Chief Rabbi, DrJoseph Hertz, agreed with this approach and highlighted the central point as being 'the danger to civilisation involved in antisemitism, as well as the steps that might be taken by Christians, working in consultation with Jews, to prevent its spread in this country', noting also how Pius XI had recently affirmed that 'Anti-semitism is a movement in which we Christians can have no part whatsoever. Spiritually we are Semites'. Hertz made it clear that Jews and Christians would be responsible for their own religious teaching without mutual interference.

At a meeting chaired by William Temple, now the nominated Archbishop of Canterbury, on 20 March 1942 the formation of the Council of Christians and Jews was agreed. The aims of the council were specified as:

- (a) To check and combat religious and racial intolerance.
- (b) To promote mutual understanding and goodwill between Christians and Jews in all sections of the community, especially in connection with problems arising from conditions created by the war.
- (c) To promote fellowship between Christian and Jewish youth organisations in educational and cultural activities.
- (d) To foster co-operation of Christians and Jews in study and service directed to post-war reconstruction.

The initial membership of the CCJ was composed of leaders of Christian and Jewish organisations. The Roman Catholic prelate, Cardinal Hinsley, agreed to be a Joint President subject to the condition that any statements be approved by him prior to publication. The formation of the CCJ was announced on radio and in the press on 1 October 1942.

== Early years ==
The CCJ was formed at a time of Nazi persecution of Jews but the full scale of the extermination process, and the response of organisations such as the CCJ, was to an extent governed by the amount of factual information then available in the public domain. In 1942 deputations were sent to the Foreign Office and Anthony Eden regarding the accounts then emerging about the Nazi extermination process, followed by a letter published in The Times on 5 December speaking of a 'horror beyond what imagination can grasp...burning indignation at this atrocity, to which the records of barbarous ages scarcely provide a parallel." The letter criticised the delays in officialdom, branding their excuses as having an 'air of irrelevance', and called for the prosecution of those involved in the extermination process after the war. Temple, at the behest of the CCJ, made a broadcast to the Hungarian people using the BBC World Service and appealed:

"do your utmost to save from persecution, it may be from massacre, those who are now threatened as a result of German occupation...Help them to hide from their tormentors, help them, if possible, to escape. Do all you can to prevent the extermination of people whose only fault is the race from which they are born or the independence of their minds and constancy of their convictions".

Some political voices raised concerns that such protestations could make things worse for the Jews but by early 1943 it had already become clear that nothing could be worse than what the Jews were currently suffering. Archbishop Temple addressed the House of Lords in March 1943 in which he referenced the massacre of Jews taking place, urging all means of action and condemned the procrastination of officialdom. He concluded: "We at this moment have upon us a tremendous responsibility. We stand at the bar of history, of humanity, and of God."

In November 1943 the Council issued the first of its "Occasional Reviews" which contained a statement by the Archbishop of Canterbury on the "Basis of Co-operation between Jews and Christians." and a response by the Chief Rabbi on the Jewish attitude to the Five Peace Points of Pope Pius XII.

In June 1944 the Council published a declaration affirming that "the moral law must govern world order " followed by six related principles.The Council said: "The significance of the afocument lies in the fact that it is the first statement of its kind to be published in this country with the approval of the heads of the Protestant, Roman Catholic and Jewish communities and on behalf of a representative hody of Christians end Jews." It was also announced that Catholic Archbishop Griffin had become a Joint President of the Council in succession to the late Cardinal Hinsley.

At 1944 annual general meeting of the Council Bishop Mathews described anti-Semitism as a type of "category dislikes": "Dislike by category is always evil. always unjustified, whether the category is the Jewish people, the negroes in the United States, or the Roman Catholics or any other body. I have an example fairly close home in the feeling of widespread indignation rooted in the population of Northern Ireland with regard to Roman Catholics. The first thing to be said about such dislike by category is that though it is evil in itself it attacks wide sections of the population. It becomes a mass instinct added to local patriotism."

In November 1944 the Catholic Archbishop of Westminster gave an address to the Council of Christians and Jews:

I should like to tell you, something of what the present Holy Father and the Vatican authorities have done to alleviate the suffering and the persecution of the Jews in many lands. There are thousands of Jews who owe their lives to the speedy intervention of the Pope when they were on the point of being massacred. Towards the end of June I was asked by the World Jewish Congress to support their appeal to the Holy Father to intervene on behalf of Hungarian Jews and it may interest you to hear the reply I received from the late Cardinal Secretary of State: "reference your telegram July 3 I beg to assure Your Excellency Holy See even through Papal Nunciature Budapest has left nothing undone and is still doing everything possible to alleviate sorrowful plight all those who are suffering on account of nationality or race."

The Archbishop proposed points for future cooperation:

Firstly by a common pledge to observe the laws of God and to fulfil Our duties to Him and to our fellow-men. Secondly. by urging the recognition on the part of all States, of the liberties and rights of man and by a clear acknowledgment of man's personal dignity, irrespective of race, creed Or Colour. Thirdly, by a deepening of the mutual understanding between Christians and Jews of our respective ideals and difficulties. And fourthly, by a solemn promise to protect effectively those who may be oppressed or persecuted for race. nationality, or creed.

Braybook (1991) notes that "Much is said of the silence of the Churches, which was often all too evident" but he picks out Temple, and the leaders of the various Churches who supported him, as an outspoken critic on this issue. The World Jewish Congress spoke of him as "the champion of the Jews".

At a meeting of the CCJ held on the 50th anniversary of Kristallnacht in 1988 Dr. Robert Runcie, the Archbishop of Canterbury acknowledged that the roots of these events lay in the preceding centuries of Christian anti-Semitism:

'Without centuries of Christian anti-Semitism, Hitlers passionate hatred would never have been so passionately echoed....The travesty of Kristallnacht and all that followed is that so much was perpetrated in Christ's name. To glorify the Third Reich, the Christian faith was betrayed. We cannot say, "We did not know", We did - and stood by.. And even today there are many Christians who fail to see it as self evident and why this blindness? Because for centuries Christians have held Jews collectively responsible for the death of Jesus. On Good Friday Jews have, in times past, cowered behind locked doors for fear of a Christian mob seeking 'revenge' for deicide. Without the poisoning of Christian minds through the centuries, the holocaust is unthinkable'.

== International Council of Christians and Jews ==
During the blitz of 1942 some British Christians and Jews met with members of the American National Conference of Christians and Jews (NCCJ) who were visiting London. It was agreed that after the war an international conference should be held for all the bodies who were active in the field of Christian-Jewish relationships. The American group had not been formed to counterattacks on Jews, as was the case in London, but rather through anti-Catholicism agitation stirred up by the Ku Klux Klan at the time when Catholic Al Smith was standing for president. Jewish and Protestant leaders in the United States reacted and this led Catholics to join them in solidarity.

The conference was held in Oxford in 1946 and over one hundred delegates from fifteen countries attended. A public meeting held on the eve of the conference included as guest speakers the Archbishop of Canterbury, Reinhold Niebuhr, R. A. Butler and Rabbi Leo Baeck, a survivor of Theresienstadt concentration camp. Various commissions were set up, a resolution was sent to the Paris Peace Conference, an agreement reached to hold an emergency conference dealing with anti-Semitism in Europe, and that a committee should research the possibility of forming an International Council of Christians and Jews which would bring together all the various national bodies. Jacques Maritain was elected to serve as co-Chairman with Dr. MacCracken of U.S.A. and the Marquess of Reading on the board of the proposed International Council of Christians and Jews.

An emergency conference took place in Seelisberg Switzerland in 1947. "The Ten Points of Seelisberg" agreed at the conference became a reference for many future statements by various Churches regarding new approaches to Judaism.

The Ten Points of Seelisberg

1. Remember that One God speaks to us all through the Old and New Testament.
2. Remember that Jesus was born of a Jewish mother of the seed of David and the people of Israel, and that His everlasting love and forgiveness embraces His own people and the whole world.
3. Remember that the first disciples, the apostles and the first martyrs were Jews.
4. Remember that the fundamental commandment of Christianity, to love God and one's neighbour, proclaimed already in the Old Testament and confirmed by Jesus, is binding upon both Christians and Jews in all human relationships, without exception.
5. Avoid distorting or misrepresenting biblical or post-biblical Judaism with the object of extolling Christianity.
6. Avoid using the word 'Jews' in the exclusive sense of the enemies of Jesus, and the words the 'enemies of Jesus' to designate the whole Jewish people.
7. Avoid presenting the Passion in such a way as to bring the odium of the killing of Jesus upon all Jews or upon the Jews alone. It was only a section of the Jews in Jerusalem who demanded the death of Jesus, and the Christian message has always been that it was the sins of mankind which were exemplified by those Jews and the sins in which all men share that brought Christ to the Cross.
8. Avoid referring to the scriptural curses, or te cry of a raging mobe: 'His blood be upon us and oour children', without remembering that this cry should not count against the infinitely more weighty words of our Lord, 'Father, forgive them, for they know not what they do'.
9. Avoid prompting the superstitious notion that the Jewish people reprobate, accursed, reserved for a destiney of suffering.

10. Avoid speaking of the Jews as if the first members of the Church had not been Jews.

Pere de Lopinit who had worked in Italian camps in which Jews had been interned during the war took the document back to the Vatican and a form of nihil obstat was received. Cardinal Griffiths was dismissive of the plan but in time the ten points may have been a formative influence in the declaration on religious liberty of Vatican II (Nostra aetate) The plan for an International Council of Christians and Jews did not come to fruition until 1974 due to differences regarding how it should be implemented .

British, French German and Swiss representatives agreed a constitution for the proposed International Council in 1948 but the American NCCJ didn't as it felt that the use of "Christian" in the organisations title would be a barrier to some people through the use of the word by some European political parties in their titles. Everett Clinchy of the NCCJ now directed his efforts into the "World Brotherhood" and the plans for an International Council for Christians and Jews were stalled. Enthusiasm for an international organization was also limited through fears of religious indifferentism from a Roman Catholic perspective and a lack of sympathy to interfaith understanding in the prevailing Protestant theological climate.In the early 1950s a directive was sent to all national Catholic hierarchies from the Vatican warning against involvement in the International Council of Christians and Jews for fear that it was tending towards religious indifferentism - see following section. Cardinal Griffin asked if it also applied to the British Council and two years later the Vatican advised that it did and all Catholic members were told to withdraw. It did not happen anywhere else and William Simpson was of the opinion that if Cardinal Griffiths had not asked the question there would have been no trouble.

An International Consultative Committee of Organizations for Christian-Jewish Cooperation was finally established, without NCCJ participation, in January 1962 at a meeting in Frankfurt. They held a conference in 1966 which issued a critique of the Vatican II Declaration Nostra aetate, the WCC's New Delhi statement on Christian-Jewish relations and a definition of dialogue:

The dialogue is essentially a dialogue between persons, an attitude to life and not a mere technique. It is a relationship which has been found in experience to be capable of deepening the spiritual life of all the participants alike, for each is given in dialogue full opportunity to express his position in all freedom. It has proved and enrichment of their faith in God to committed Jews and Christians, and has dispelled many misunderstandings of each about the faith and practice of the other. We believe that it is not only consistent with our several loyalties to Church and Synagogue, but that it also increases interreligious harmony as we face together the problems and needs of our changing world.

In 1974 the NCCJ did join and at their suggestion the name of the organisation was changed to the International Council of Christians and Jews (ICCJ). In 1975 the ICCJ met in Hamburg and such conferences developed into an annual event focussed on certain themes such as "When Religion is Used as a Weapon ...The Use and Misuse of Religion in Defence of National and Fundamental Values" (1991) The first international youth conference was hosted by the CCJ in Wales in 1977.

== Relations with the Roman Catholic Church ==
See also Pope Pius XII and Judaism

During the pontificate of Pope Pius XII "a heavy blow fell on the Council" when in November 1954 Cardinal Griffin announced that the Roman Catholic Church would be withdrawing from the CCJ following an instruction received from the Vatican indicating that the educational work being done by the council could result in religious indifferentism. Leading Roman Catholics resigned from the CCJ in the aftermath. The Catholic Herald reported in December 1954:

It has now been publicly announced that the Holy See has instructed Catholics to relinquish their membership of the Council of Christians and Jews. Cardinal Griffin, one of the presidents. Lord Perth, a joint treasurer. and Lord Pekenham resigned some time ago. Discussions have been going on for a considerable time "in the hope" says The Times, "of finding a way to restore the united outlook on those matters of common concern for which the council have stood since they were set up in 1942. The council's aim was to combat religious and racial intolerance. promote understanding and good will between Christians and Jews and to foster co-operation.

The popular press was highly critical of this development with headlines such as "The Pope bans Queen's Council" and criticising Roman Catholic intolerance. The Catholic periodical "The Tablet" expressed the view that the public resignations ought to have been avoided, further discussions held, and that the Vatican should have made the reasons for the withdrawal explicit. The reasons for the withdrawal were never clearly explained, however Roman Catholic theologian Jacques Maritain had previously warned the CCJ that Rome was suspicious of any cooperative ventures between Jews, Protestants and Catholics. A Church source commented: "From the Roman Catholic side there was no failure to appreciate the aims and objects to promote which this council exists, but the Vatican was not satisfied with some of the ways and means adopted by the council in pursuit of those aims."

During the pontificate of Pope John XXIII Catholics were once again permitted to join the CCJ, including notable figures such as Lord Longford and Lord Perth. In 1962 the Earl of Perth and two Catholic laymen served on the Council with ecclesiastical approval. In 1964 Archbishop Heenan addressed the CCJ and expressed the opinion that the original withdrawal from the Council was due to a misunderstanding in Rome. The Archbishop said many people, had been "disappointed even scandalised" by the original decision and that it was "possible and even probable that the Vatican was misinformed," In June 1964 Archbishop Heenan accepted the invitation to become a joint president of the Council with the Catholic Herald commenting "By so doing, the break which has lasted ten years between the Council and the Catholic Church has been fully mended." The Council's other four presidents were the Chief Rabbi, the Archbishop of Canterbury, the Moderator of the General Assembly of the Church of Scotland, and the Moderator of the Free Church Federal Council.

The early difficulties associated with Roman Catholic membership largely disappeared in the aftermath of the issuing of Nostra aetate by the Second Vatican Council. In 1980 and 1990 Pope John Paul II met delegations from the CCJ and conferred a knighthood on Sir Sigmund Sternberg who was joint treasurer of the CCJ and chairman of the International Council of Christians and Jews.

== Later years ==
The CCJ established The Robert Waley Cohen Memorial Lectureship in 1956 as a tribute to Robert Waley Cohen and his service to the Council. Annual lecturers have included Sir Isaiah Berlin (John Stuart Mill and the Ends of Life, 1959), Abba Eban (The Final Solution, 1961), Dr Michael Ramsey (The Crisis of Human Freedom, 1962), Henry Chadwick (Some Reflections on Conscience: Greek, Jewish and Christian, 1968), Gregory Baum (Christian Theology After Auchwitz, 1976) In 1979 the CCJ established the annual The Sigmund Sternberg Award for individuals who had made a contribution to furthering Christian-Jewish relations. Local councils were encouraged when the CCJ was formed but the relationship between local councils and the national Council was not always easy through a want of a democratic framework. This was addressed in a revised constitution in 1990. By 1991 the CCJ had 47 in the U.K.

The Patron of the CCJ was Queen Elizabeth II and she was succeeded by King Charles III in May 2024. The CCJ has a number of Presidents who in 2024 were the Archbishop of Canterbury Cardinal Archbishop of Westminster, the Archbishop of Thyateira and Great Britain, the Chief Rabbi of the United Hebrew Congregations of the Commonwealth, the Moderator of the Free Churches, the Spiritual Head, Spanish and Portuguese Jews’ Congregation, Chief Executive, Liberal Judaism and Rev Fiona Smith the Principal Clerk of the General Assembly of the Church of Scotland.

== "Children of One God" ==
In 1992 Marcus Braybrooke, a former executive director of CCJ, published A History of the Council of Christians and Jews: Children of One God which has been described as "the essential locus classicus" for the history of the Councils origins and development during its first fifty years. The Tablet in its review commented:

With an index, a body of footnotes, pages of photographs, several appendices and a well-researched, well-documented text, it is a valuable resource for any student. But the approach the author has chosen and his very conscientiousness are both a strength and a weakness. Some of the material makes compelling reading, but there are pages which, inevitably, are of interest primarily to the specialist.

The Catholic Herald in its review commented:

To members of the council, this book will be a most helpful account of the origins and history of the movement which has held them enthralled ever since they joined it. To others it will be an eye opener, but regrettably there will be many Christians and Jews who will still not want to know in case their prejudices are disturbed. The author has written a factual account of the growth of the Council of Christians and Jews from its birth in 1941 up to the present. It is obviously meticulously researched, in great detail, and gives no all over golden picture.

== See also ==
- Christian–Jewish reconciliation
- Relations between Catholicism and Judaism
