= Pope Pius XII and Judaism =

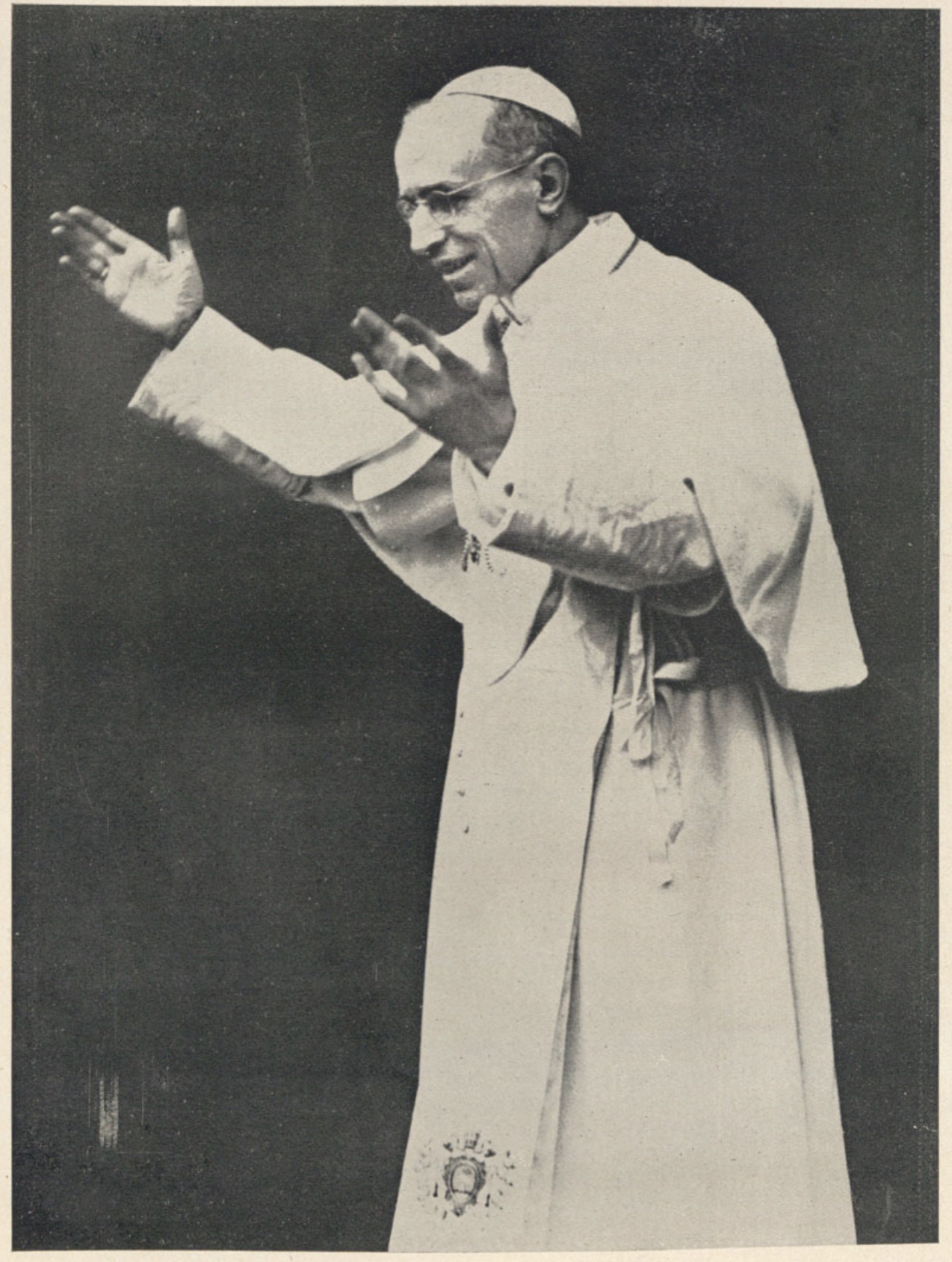
Pope Pius XII

The relations between Pope Pius XII and Judaism have long been controversial, especially those questions that surround Pope Pius XII and the Holocaust. Other issues involve Pius's Jewish friendships and his attitude towards the new state of Israel.

== 1917 intervention in Palestine ==
Documents discovered in the Vatican archives by Michael Hesemann indicate that Archbishop Pacelli intervened in 1917, through the German government, to assure the Jews of Palestine that they would be protected from any harm from the Ottoman Turks. Hesemann further stated that Pacelli also directly intervened with the World Zionist Organization representative Nachum Sokolov, and used his influence to arrange for Mr. Sokolov to meet directly with the Benedict XV in 1917 to discuss a Jewish homeland in Palestine. In 1926, Pacelli also encouraged Catholics in Germany to join the Committee Pro Palestina, which supported Jewish settlements in Palestine.

== 1938 Eucharistic conference ==
An International Eucharistic Conference took place in Budapest in Hungary during 1938. Cardinal Pacelli used the opportunity to denounce "the lugubrious array of the militant godless, shaking the clenched fist of anti-Christ." He added, in words that have been misinterpreted: "Where now are Herod and Pilate, Nero and Diocletian, and Julian the Apostate, and all the persecutors of the First Century? St. Ambrose replies: ‘The Christians who have been massacred have won the victory; the vanquished were their persecutors.'"

According to a contemporary translation into Hungarian of a second quote from Pacelli's discourse, which was originally delivered in French, Pacelli also stated: "As opposed to the foes of Jesus, who cried out to his face, 'Crucify him!' we sing him hymns of our loyalty and our love. We act in this fashion, not out of bitterness, not out of a sense of superiority, not out of arrogance toward those whose lips curse him and whose hearts reject him even today."

This second quote, which was published in a Hungarian newspaper, has been used by some commentators to imply that Pacelli was making an antisemitic remark, despite his words including non-Jews (such as the Roman emperors and Pontius Pilate) in the speech. This claim is disputed by those who have access to the original and complete French text, such as Fr. Peter Gumpel, law professor Ronald J. Rychlak, and historian William Doino, Jr., who state that the context indicates that it was an attack on the mass political movements of the day, and was particularly applicable to fascism.

== Attitude during the Holocaust ==
Cardinal Secretary of State Luigi Maglione received a request from Chief Rabbi of Palestine Isaac Herzog in the spring of 1940 to intercede on behalf of Lithuanian Jews about to be deported to Germany. Pius called Ribbentrop on March 11, repeatedly protesting against the treatment of Jews. In his 1940 encyclical Summi Pontificatus, Pius rejected antisemitism, stating that in the Catholic Church, there is "neither Gentile nor Jew, circumcision nor uncircumcision." In the summer of 1942, Pius explained to his college of Cardinals the reasons for the great gulf that existed between Jews and Christians at the theological level: "Jerusalem has responded to His call and to His grace with the same rigid blindness and stubborn ingratitude that has led it along the path of guilt to the murder of God." Historian Guido Knopp describes these comments of Pius as being "incomprehensible" at a time when "Jerusalem was being murdered by the million". Revising a previous opinion of his, Michael Phayer asserted that Pius did speak out against the Holocaust in his 1942 Christmas message.

== Biblical issues ==
The encyclical, Divino afflante Spiritu, published in September 1943, emphasized the place of the Bible. He encouraged Christian theologians to revisit original versions of the Bible in Greek and Hebrew. Noting improvements in archaeology, the encyclical reversed Pope Leo XIII's encyclical, which had only advocated going back to the original texts to resolve ambiguity in the Latin Vulgate. The encyclical demands a much better understanding of ancient Jewish history and traditions. It requires bishops throughout the Church to initiate biblical studies for lay people. The Pontiff also requests a reorientation of Catholic teaching and education, relying much more on sacred scriptures in sermons and religious instruction.

== Relations with Israel ==
In multiplicibus curis is a peace encyclical of Pope Pius XII focusing on the war in Palestine. It was given at Castel Gandolfo, near Rome, October 24, 1948, the tenth year of his Pontificate.

When war was declared, the Pope maintained the attitude of impartiality but also looked for possibilities for justice and peace in Palestine and for the respect and protection of the Holy Places. Pope Pius organized charities for the refugees and victims of the war, fully recognizing that this would not be sufficient.

Pius also made a proposal for Jerusalem to become an international city, either under the United Nations or a related organization. The idea first appeared in the 1949 encyclical Redemptoris nostri cruciatus. It was later re-proposed during the papacies of John XXIII, Paul VI and John Paul II.

== Friendly relationship with Guido Mendes ==
In 1958, Dr. Guido Mendes wrote an article in the Jerusalem Post explaining how he had been friends with Pope Pacelli since his youth. He said that the Pope had discussed Jewish theology and participated in a Sabbath with important members of the Roman Jewish community. They exchanged ideals and future prospects, with Pacelli later expressing enthusiasm for the new State of Israel.

== Conversion of rabbi Israel Zolli ==
According to biographer Judith Cabaud, in 1944, while conducting a Yom Kippur service, the Chief Rabbi of Rome, Israel Zolli, experienced a mystical vision about Jesus Christ. Shortly after the end of World War II, Rabbi Zolli and his second wife (his first wife had died years before) were received into the Roman Catholic Church. Zolli then went to the Gregorian University. He was baptized by Mgr. Luigi Traglia in the presence of Father Dezza, also known as Paolo Cardinal Dezza. Israel Zolli was named Eugenio Maria Zolli in honor of Pope Pius XII, who was born Eugenio Pacelli.

== Council of Christians and Jews ==
The Council of Christians and Jews is a voluntary organisation in the United Kingdom and is composed of Christians and Jews working together to counter antisemitism and other forms of intolerance in Britain. In late 1954, and reflecting the theology of the era, the Vatican instructed the head of English Catholics to resign from the council due to its perceived indifferentism, with Catholics not returning until the reforms introduced by the Second Vatican Council.

== Good Friday Prayer for the Jews ==
Kneeling had always accompanied the other petitions in the Holy Week liturgy. In 1955, Pope Pius XII re-instituted kneeling for this petition (the prayer for the Jews).

The English translation of the prayer read:

Let us pray also for the faithless Jews: that almighty God may remove the veil from their hearts; so that they too may acknowledge Jesus Christ our Lord. Let us pray. Let us kneel. [pause for silent prayer] Arise. Almighty and eternal God, who dost not exclude from thy mercy even Jewish faithlessness: hear our prayers, which we offer for the blindness of that people; that acknowledging the light of thy Truth, which is Christ, they may be delivered from their darkness. Through the same our Lord Jesus Christ, who liveth and reigneth with thee in the unity of the Holy Spirit, God, for ever and ever. Amen.

== Jewish orphans controversy ==
In 2005, Corriere della Sera published a document dated 20 November 1946 on the subject of Jewish children baptized in war-time France. The document ordered that baptized children, if orphaned, should be kept in Catholic custody and stated that the decision "has been approved by the Holy Father".

== See also ==
- Catholic Church and Nazi Germany

== Sources ==
- Morley, John. 1980. Vatican diplomacy and the Jews during the Holocaust, 1939-1943. New York : KTAV Pub. House. ISBN 0-87068-701-8.
- Weisbord, Robert G., and Sillanpoa, Wallace P. 1991. The Chief Rabbi, the Pope, and the Holocaust: An Era in Vatican-Jewish Relations. Transaction Publishers. ISBN 0-88738-416-1.
- Phayer, Michael (2000). The Catholic Church and the Holocaust, 1930–1965. Bloomington and Indianapolis: Indiana University Press. ISBN 9780253337252.
- Phayer, Michael (2008). Pius XII, the Holocaust, and the Cold War. Bloomington and Indianapolis: Indiana University Press. ISBN 9780253349309.
