= United Nations General Assembly Resolution 303 (IV) =

UN General Assembly Resolution 303(IV)
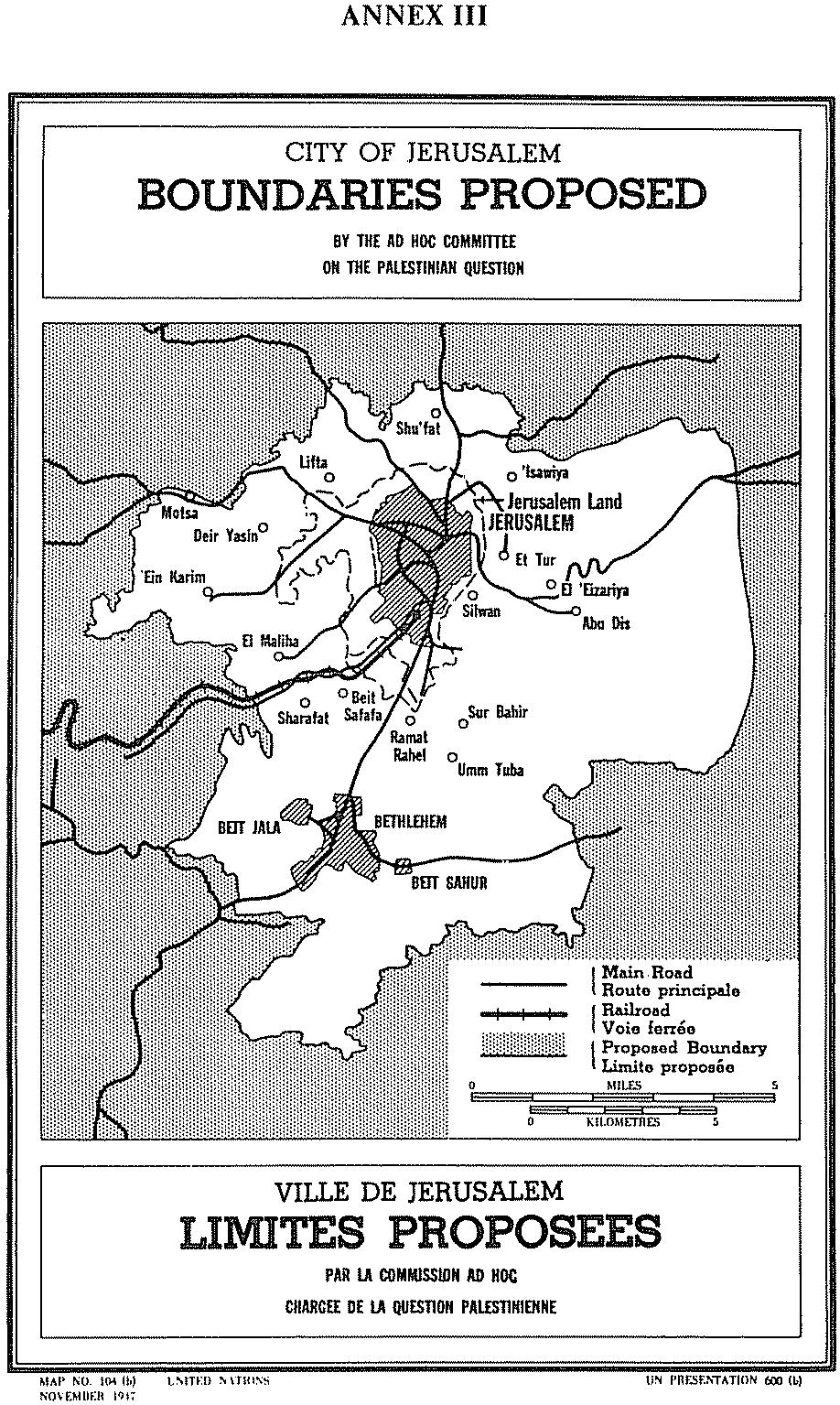
- The resolution attached a copy of the map from the 1947 United Nations Partition Plan for Palestine
- Date: 9 December 1949
- Meeting no.: PV 275
- Code: A/RES/303(IV) (Document)
- Subject: Palestine: question of an international regime for the Jerusalem area and the protection of the Holy Places
- Voting summary: 38 voted for; 14 voted against; 7 abstained
- Result: Adopted

United Nations General Assembly Resolution 303, adopted on 9 December 1949 by a vote of 38 to 14 (with 7 abstentions), restated the United Nations' support for a Corpus separatum in Jerusalem. Notably the voting pattern was significantly different from that of the United Nations Partition Plan for Palestine vote two years earlier, with many states swapping sides. In particular, all the Arab and Muslim countries voted for the corpus separatum, having voted against the 1947 plan; conversely the United States and Israel voted against the corpus separatum, having previously supported it.

The outcome of the vote was "even more decisive than the vote for the Partition Plan itself".

== Background ==
In July 1920, at the San Remo conference, a Class "A" League of Nations mandates over Palestine was allocated to the British. On 29 November 1947, the UN General Assembly adopted a resolution recommending "to the United Kingdom, as the mandatory Power for Palestine, and to all other Members of the United Nations the adoption and implementation, with regard to the future government of Palestine, of the Plan of Partition with Economic Union" as Resolution 181 (II). The plan contained a proposal to terminate the British Mandate for Palestine and partition Palestine into "independent Arab and Jewish States and the Special International Regime for the City of Jerusalem." On 14 May 1948, the day on which the British Mandate over Palestine expired, the Jewish People's Council gathered at the Tel Aviv Museum, and approved a proclamation which declared the establishment of a Jewish state in Eretz Israel, to be known as the State of Israel.

On 11 May 1949, Israel was admitted to membership in the United Nations.

Early in December 1949, Israel declared Jerusalem as its capital, despite controlling only West Jerusalem, with East Jerusalem (including the Old City) being controlled by Transjordan.

== The resolution ==
The full text of the Resolution:

Having regard to its resolutions 181 (11) of 29 November 1947 and 194 (111) of 11 December 1948,

Having studied the reports of the United Nations Conciliation Commission for Palestine set up under the latter resolution,

I. Decides

In relation to Jerusalem,

Believing that the principles underlying its previous resolutions concerning this matter, and in particular its resolution of 29 November 1947, represent a just and equitable settlement of the question,

1. To restate, therefore, its intention that Jerusalem should be placed under a permanent international regime, which should envisage appropriate guarantees for the protection of the Holy Places, both within and outside Jerusalem and to confirm specifically the following provisions of General Assembly resolution 181 (II): (1) The City of Jerusalem shall be established as a corpus separatum under a special international regime and shall be administered by the United Nations; (2) The Trusteeship Council shall be designated to discharge the responsibilities of the Administering Authority . . .; and (3) The City of Jerusalem shall include the present municipality of Jerusalem plus the surrounding villages and towns, the most eastern of which shall be Abu Dis; the most southern, Bethlehem; the most western, Ein Karim (including also the built-up area of Motsa); and the most northern., Shu'fat, as indicated on the attached sketch-map (annex B)(2);

2. To request for this purpose that the Trusteeship Council at its next session, whether special or regular, complete the preparation of the Statute of Jerusalem (T/118/Rev. 2), omitting the now inapplicable provisions, such as articles 32 and 39, and, without prejudice to the fundamental principles of the international regime for Jerusalem set forth in General Assembly resolution 181 (II) introducing therein amendments in the direction of its greater democratization, approve the Statute, and proceed immediately with its implementation. The Trusteeship Council shall not allow any actions taken by any interested Government or Governments to divert it from adopting and implementing the Statute of Jerusalem;

II. Calls upon the States concerned, to make formal undertakings, at an early date and in the light of their obligations as Members of the United Nations, that they will approach these matters with good will, and be guided by the terms of the present resolution.

Notes:

(1) UN Doc. A11245, December 10, 1949. Back

(2) Map is omitted. Back

== Voting record for Resolution 303(IV) ==
| | Voting in parts | | | | | | | | Whole resolution |
|---|---|---|---|---|---|---|---|---|---|
| | In relation to Jerusalem, Believing that the principles underlying its previous resolutions concerning this matter, and in particular its resolution of 29 November 1947, represent a just and equitable settlement of the question, 1. To restate, therefore, its intention that Jerusalem should be placed under a permanent international regime, which should envisage appropriate guarantees for the protection of the Holy Places, both within and outside Jerusalem and to confirm specifically the following provisions of General Assembly resolution 181 | (1) The City of Jerusalem shall be established as a corpus separatum under a special international regime and shall be administered by the United Nations; | (2) The Trusteeship Council shall be designated to discharge the responsibilities of the Administering Authority | (3) The City of Jerusalem shall include the present municipality of Jerusalem plus the surrounding villages and towns, the most eastern of which shall be Abu Dis; the most southern, Bethlehem; the most western, Ein Karim (including also the built-up area of Motsa); and the most northern., Shu'fat, as indicated on the attached sketch-map (annex B)(2); | 2. To request for this purpose that the Trusteeship Council at its next session, whether special or regular, complete the preparation of the Statute of Jerusalem (T/118/Rev. 2), omitting the now inapplicable provisions, such as articles 32 and 39, and, without prejudice to the fundamental principles of the international regime for Jerusalem set forth in General Assembly resolution 181 (II) introducing therein amendments in the direction of its greater democratization, approve the Statute | and proceed immediately with its implementation. | The Trusteeship Council shall not allow any actions taken by any interested Government or Governments to divert it from adopting and implementing the Statute of Jerusalem; | II. Calls upon the States concerned, to make formal undertakings, at an early date and in the light of their obligations as Members of the United Nations, that they will approach these matters with good will, and be guided by the terms of the present resolution. | Whole resolution |
| Afghanistan | In favour | In favour | In favour | In favour | In favour | In favour | In favour | In favour | In favour |
| Argentina | In favour | In favour | In favour | In favour | In favour | In favour | In favour | In favour | In favour |
| Australia | In favour | In favour | In favour | In favour | In favour | In favour | In favour | In favour | In favour |
| Belgium | In favour | In favour | In favour | In favour | In favour | In favour | In favour | In favour | In favour |
| Bolivia | In favour | In favour | In favour | In favour | In favour | In favour | In favour | In favour | In favour |
| Brazil | In favour | In favour | In favour | In favour | In favour | In favour | In favour | In favour | In favour |
| Burma Burma | In favour | In favour | In favour | In favour | In favour | In favour | In favour | In favour | In favour |
| Byelorussian SSR | In favour | In favour | In favour | In favour | In favour | In favour | In favour | In favour | In favour |
| Canada | Against | Against | Against | Against | Against | Against | Against | Against | Against |
| Chile | Abstaining | Abstaining | Abstaining | Abstaining | Abstaining | Abstaining | Abstaining | Abstaining | Abstaining |
| (Taiwan) China | In favour | In favour | In favour | In favour | In favour | In favour | In favour | In favour | In favour |
| Colombia | In favour | In favour | In favour | In favour | In favour | In favour | In favour | In favour | In favour |
| Costa Rica | Against | Against | Against | Against | Against | Against | Against | Against | Against |
| Cuba | In favour | In favour | In favour | In favour | In favour | In favour | In favour | In favour | In favour |
| Czechoslovakia | In favour | In favour | In favour | In favour | In favour | In favour | In favour | In favour | In favour |
| Denmark | Against | Against | Against | Against | Against | Against | Against | Against | Against |
| Dominican Republic | In favour | In favour | Abstaining | Abstaining | Abstaining | Abstaining | Abstaining | Abstaining | Abstaining |
| Ecuador | In favour | In favour | In favour | In favour | In favour | In favour | In favour | In favour | In favour |
| Egypt Egypt | In favour | In favour | In favour | In favour | In favour | In favour | In favour | In favour | In favour |
| El Salvador | In favour | In favour | In favour | In favour | In favour | In favour | In favour | In favour | In favour |
| Ethiopia | In favour | In favour | In favour | In favour | In favour | In favour | In favour | In favour | In favour |
| France | In favour | In favour | In favour | In favour | In favour | In favour | In favour | In favour | In favour |
| Greece Greece | In favour | In favour | In favour | In favour | In favour | In favour | In favour | In favour | In favour |
| Guatemala | Against | Against | Against | Against | Against | Against | Against | Against | Against |
| Haiti | In favour | In favour | In favour | In favour | In favour | In favour | In favour | In favour | In favour |
| Honduras | Abstaining | Abstaining | Abstaining | Abstaining | Abstaining | Abstaining | Abstaining | Abstaining | Abstaining |
| Iceland | Against | Against | Against | Against | Against | Against | Against | Against | Against |
| India | In favour | In favour | In favour | In favour | In favour | In favour | In favour | In favour | In favour |
| Iran | In favour | In favour | In favour | In favour | In favour | In favour | In favour | In favour | In favour |
| Iraq | In favour | In favour | In favour | In favour | In favour | In favour | In favour | In favour | In favour |
| Israel | Against | Against | Against | Against | Against | Against | Against | Against | Against |
| Lebanon | In favour | In favour | In favour | In favour | In favour | In favour | In favour | In favour | In favour |
| Liberia | In favour | In favour | In favour | In favour | In favour | In favour | In favour | In favour | In favour |
| Luxembourg | In favour | In favour | In favour | In favour | In favour | In favour | In favour | In favour | In favour |
| Mexico | In favour | In favour | In favour | Abstaining | Abstaining | In favour | Abstaining | In favour | In favour |
| Netherlands | Abstaining | Abstaining | Against | Abstaining | Abstaining | Abstaining | Abstaining | Against | Abstaining |
| New Zealand | Abstaining | Abstaining | Abstaining | Abstaining | Abstaining | Abstaining | Abstaining | Abstaining | Abstaining |
| Nicaragua | In favour | In favour | In favour | In favour | In favour | In favour | In favour | In favour | In favour |
| Norway | Against | Against | Against | Against | Against | Against | Against | Against | Against |
| Pakistan | In favour | In favour | In favour | In favour | In favour | In favour | In favour | In favour | In favour |
| Panama | Abstaining | Abstaining | Abstaining | Abstaining | Abstaining | Abstaining | Abstaining | Abstaining | Abstaining |
| Paraguay | In favour | In favour | In favour | In favour | In favour | In favour | In favour | In favour | In favour |
| Peru | In favour | In favour | In favour | In favour | In favour | In favour | In favour | In favour | In favour |
| Philippines | In favour | In favour | In favour | In favour | In favour | In favour | In favour | In favour | In favour |
| Poland Poland | In favour | In favour | In favour | In favour | In favour | In favour | In favour | In favour | In favour |
| Saudi Arabia | In favour | In favour | In favour | In favour | In favour | In favour | In favour | In favour | In favour |
| Sweden | Against | Against | Against | Against | Against | Against | Against | Against | Against |
| (Syria) Syrian | In favour | In favour | In favour | In favour | In favour | In favour | In favour | In favour | In favour |
| Thailand | Abstaining | Abstaining | Abstaining | Abstaining | Abstaining | Abstaining | Abstaining | Abstaining | Abstaining |
| Turkey | Against | Against | Against | Against | Against | Against | Against | Against | Against |
| Ukrainian SSR | In favour | In favour | In favour | In favour | In favour | In favour | In favour | In favour | In favour |
| (Union of South Africa) South Africa | Against | Against | Against | Against | Against | Against | Against | Against | Against |
| United Kingdom | Against | Against | Against | Against | Against | Against | Against | Against | Against |
| United States | Against | Against | Against | Against | Against | Against | Against | Against | Against |
| Uruguay | Against | Against | Against | Against | Against | Against | Against | Against | Against |
| Soviet Union | In favour | In favour | In favour | In favour | In favour | In favour | In favour | In favour | In favour |
| Venezuela | In favour | In favour | In favour | In favour | In favour | In favour | In favour | In favour | In favour |
| Yemen | In favour | In favour | In favour | In favour | In favour | In favour | In favour | In favour | In favour |
| (Socialist Federal Republic of Yugoslavia) Yugoslavia | Against | Against | Against | Against | Against | Against | Against | Against | Against |
| In favour | 39 | 39 | 38 | 37 | 37 | 38 | 37 | 38 | 38 |
| Against | 14 | 14 | 15 | 14 | 14 | 14 | 14 | 15 | 14 |
| Abstaining | 6 | 6 | 6 | 8 | 8 | 7 | 8 | 6 | 7 |

=== Comparison versus 1947 Partition Plan ===
| | For | | Against | | Abstained | | Absent |
| | UNGA 181 | UNGA 303(IV) | UNGA 181 | UNGA 303(IV) | UNGA 181 | UNGA 303(IV) | UNGA 181 |
|---|---|---|---|---|---|---|---|
| Latin American and Caribbean | * Bolivia | *Argentina | * Cuba | *Costa Rica | *Argentina | * Chile | |
| | * Brazil | * Bolivia | | *Guatemala | ** Chile | *Honduras | |
| | *Costa Rica | * Brazil | | *Uruguay | *Colombia | * Dominican Republic | |
| | * Dominican Republic | *Colombia | | | *El Salvador | *Panama | |
| | *Ecuador | * Cuba | | | *Honduras | | |
| | *Guatemala | *Ecuador | | | *Mexico | | |
| | *Haiti | *El Salvador | | | | | |
| | *Nicaragua | * Haiti | | | | | |
| | *Panama | *Mexico | | | | | |
| | *Paraguay | *Nicaragua | | | | | |
| | *Peru | *Paraguay | | | | | |
| | *Uruguay | *Peru | | | | | |
| | * Venezuela | * Venezuela | | | | | |
| Western European and Others | *Belgium | *Belgium | *Greece Greece | *Turkey | *United Kingdom | *Netherlands | |
| | *Denmark | * France | *Turkey | *Denmark | | | |
| | * France | *Greece Greece | | *Iceland | | | |
| | *Iceland | *Luxembourg | | *Norway | | | |
| | *Luxembourg | | | *Sweden | | | |
| | *Netherlands | | | *United Kingdom | | | |
| | *Norway | | | *Israel (new) | | | |
| | *Sweden | | | | | | |
| Eastern European | *Byelorussian SSR | *Byelorussian SSR | | *Yugoslavia | *Yugoslavia | | |
| | * Czechoslovakia | * Czechoslovakia | | | | | |
| | *Poland Poland | *Poland Poland | | | | | |
| | *Ukrainian SSR | *Ukrainian SSR | | | | | |
| | *Soviet Union | *Soviet Union | | | | | |
| African | *Liberia | *Liberia | *Egypt | *South Africa | * Ethiopia | | |
| | * (Union of South Africa) South Africa *Egypt Egypt | | | | | | |
| | | * Ethiopia | | | | | |
| Asia-Pacific | *Australia | * Afghanistan | * Afghanistan | | * (Taiwan) China | *Thailand | *Thailand |
| | *New Zealand | * India | * India | | | *New Zealand | |
| | *Philippines | * Iran | * Iran | | | | |
| | | * Iraq | * Iraq | | | | |
| | | *Lebanon | *Lebanon | | | | |
| | | * Pakistan | * Pakistan | | | | |
| | | *Saudi Arabia | *Saudi Arabia | | | | |
| | | * (Syria) Syrian | * (Syria) Syrian | | | | |
| | | * Yemen | * Yemen | | | | |
| | | *Australia | | | | | |
| | | * (Taiwan) China | | | | | |
| | | * Philippines | | | | | |
| | | *Burma Burma (new) | | | | | |
| North America | *Canada | | | *Canada | | | |
| | *United States | | | *United States | | | |

== Bibliography ==
- Hahn, Peter L. "Alignment by Coincidence: Israel, the United States, and the Partition of Jerusalem, 1949–1953." The International History Review, vol. 21, no. 3, 1999, pp. 665–689. JSTOR 40109080
- Abraham Bell and Eugene Kontorovich, Palestine, Uti Possidetis Juris, and the Borders of Israel
