= Corpus separatum =

City or region given special status

Corpus separatum is a Latin term referring to a city or region which is given a special legal and political status different from its environment, but which falls short of being sovereign, or an independent city state. The term may refer to:

- Corpus separatum (Jerusalem), the 1947 UN proposal for Jerusalem
- Corpus separatum (Fiume), the historical status of Fiume (today's Rijeka, Croatia) between 1776 and 1918
- Pordenone, a corpus separatum between 1378 and 1514
- Novi Pazar, a corpus separatum between 1878 and 1912

Similar but different concepts include:

- Enclave and exclave
- Federal districts
- Condominium (international law)
- International city

During the Austro-Hungarian rule in Bosnia and Herzegovina, Bosnia and Herzegovina was sometimes described as corpus separatum as well as a condominium.

== See also ==
- Brčko District of Bosnia and Herzegovina
