= Protectorate of the Holy See =

Historical event in Mandate Palestine

For nearly 400 years France held a special status in the Ottoman Empire called the French Protectorate of Jerusalem, which was part of the capitulation system in the empire. The capitulations were unilaterally abolished by Turkey in 1914, at the start of the First World War.

Following this, France attempted to restore the protectorate and to gain possession of parts of Palestine; but for all practical purpose the French role in Palestine came to an end in 1918 with the British takeover of Palestine. The last vestiges of the protectorate exercised by France for four centuries over the “Latin” Christians of the former Ottoman Empire were formally abolished by article 28 of the Treaty of Lausanne (1923). The era of the privileged French presence in Palestine and more specifically in Jerusalem had come to an end. However, thanks to the Holy See, France continued to enjoy liturgical honors in Mandatory Palestine until 1924, when the honors were abolished.

France did not willingly accept the loss of its special status in the Middle East, and continues to take a special interest in the area, especially the French claims in Jerusalem.

== History ==
In 1535, the Ottoman Suleiman the Magnificent granted Francis I of France, whose kingdom was dubbed the “Elder Daughter of the Church”, the right to protect his subjects residing in the Ottoman Empire. This protection was expanded in 1740 both individually and collectively to cover all the members of the clergy adhering to the Latin rite settled in the Levant, regardless of nationality or institution. These legal privileges were extended by custom to Orthodox Christians, and came to be known as the French Protectorate of Jerusalem. Through what became known as capitulations, France extracted in the 16th and then in the 18th centuries from the weakened Empire individual and religious freedom for French subjects, providing the legal basis of the protectorate system.

On 9 September 1914, upon the outbreak of war in Europe, the Ottoman government unilaterally abolished the capitulations system.

At the San Remo conference (19-26 April 1920), the Mandate for Palestine was allocated by the League of Nations to Great Britain. France sought a continuation of its religious protectorate in Palestine but Italy and Great Britain opposed it. France lost the religious protectorate but, due to the Holy See, continued to enjoy liturgical honors in Mandatory Palestine until 1924, when the honors were abolished. The precise boundaries of all territories, including that of the British Mandate for Palestine, were left unspecified, to "be determined by the Principal Allied Powers". During that time, the British were in control of Palestine and the France was given control of Syria and Lebanon, and a mandate.
