= Redemptoris nostri cruciatus =

1949 papal encyclical on Palestine

Redemptoris nostri cruciatus Latin for 'The passion of our Redeemer' Encyclical of Pope Pius XII
- Signature date: 15 April 1949
- Number: 16 of the pontificate

Redemptoris nostri cruciatus (The passion of our Redeemer) is an encyclical of Pope Pius XII dated 15 April 1949 focusing on the situation in Palestine immediately following the cessation of fighting in the 1948 Arab–Israeli War. It was published shortly after the signing of armistice agreements between Arabs and Jews that brought the war to an end.

The Pope mentioned the numerous refugees who lived in exile and even in concentration camps, and asks for more systematic efforts to allow those people a life in peace. The encyclical, however, makes no mention of Israel.

The Pope’s main concern was for the holy places in the region. He stated that the holy places now faced difficulties and uncertainty, and repeated his call for the internationalization of Jerusalem:

We have already insisted in Our Encyclical letter In multiplicibus, that the time has come when Jerusalem and its vicinity, where the previous memorials of the Life and Death of the Divine Redeemer are preserved, should be accorded and legally guaranteed an "international" status, which in the present circumstances seems to offer the best and most satisfactory protection for these sacred monuments.

The encyclical argued that internationalization would provide "due immunity and protection be guaranteed to all the Holy Places of Palestine not only in Jerusalem but also in the other cities and villages as well." It also stated that "not a few of these [holy] places have suffered serious loss and damage owing to the upheaval and devastation of the war," [and] "these places should also be suitably protected by definite statute guaranteed by an "international" agreement."

The Pope instructed the many Catholic institutions in Palestine to help the poor, to educate youth and give hospitality to visitors. They should carry out unimpeded the work they did in the past. The Holy Places, which Catholics during many centuries have acquired and time and again defended, should be preserved inviolate.

== See also ==
- Pontifical Mission for Palestine
- Status of Jerusalem
- Corpus separatum (Jerusalem)
