= In multiplicibus curis =

1948 encyclical by Pope Pius XII on the Holy Land

In multiplicibus curis Encyclical of Pope Pius XII
- Signature date: 24 October 1948
- Number: 15 of the pontificate

In multiplicibus curis was an encyclical given by Pope Pius XII on 24 October 1948 at Castel Gandolfo, near Rome, in the tenth year of his pontificate. The encyclical repeated the Vatican's prior attitude to its concerns in the Holy Land and came at a time when the 1948 Arab–Israeli War was still raging, but after Israel went on the offensive in Operation Yoav.

In the encyclical, Pope Pius expressed concern at what he called "the destruction and damage of sacred buildings and charitable places built around the Holy Places" scattered throughout Palestine especially in Jerusalem.

While "condemning any recourse to violence", the Pope stated that "peace could only be realized in truth and justice; that is to say by respecting the rights of acquired traditions."

The Pope sought to maintain the Holy See's official attitude of impartiality in the Israeli–Palestinian conflict but also looked for possibilities for justice and peace in Palestine and for the respect and protection of the Holy Places. The Pope also expressed concern for the plight of "the unhappy victims of the war" (which was understood to refer especially to Palestinian refugees).

The Pope repeated his call for Jerusalem and its outskirts be given an international character, which would "offer a better guarantee for the protection of the sanctuaries". He also called for international guarantees of "free access to Holy Places scattered throughout Palestine, and the freedom of worship and the respect of customs and religious traditions".
