= Israeli annexation of East Jerusalem =

Effective annexation of East Jerusalem by Israel in 1967

Israel occupied East Jerusalem during the 1967 Six-Day War and later annexed it.

Jerusalem was envisaged as a separate, international city under the 1947 United Nations partition plan, but it was divided by the 1948 war that followed Israel's declaration of independence. As a result of the 1949 Armistice Agreements, the city's western half came under Israeli control, while its eastern half, containing the Old City, fell under Jordanian control. (Note: "Both states treated the respective sectors of Jerusalem under their effective control as forming an integral part of their state territory between 1948 and 1967, and each recognized the other's de facto control in their respective sectors by the signature of the 1949 Jordan-Israel General Armistice Agreement.") In 1950, Jordan annexed East Jerusalem as part of its larger annexation of the West Bank.

Israel occupied East Jerusalem during the 1967 Six-Day War; since then, the entire city has been under Israeli control. In Israel, the reunification of Jerusalem is commemorated as Jerusalem Day, an annual holiday. In July 1980, the Knesset passed the Jerusalem Law as part of the country's Basic Laws, which declared a unified Jerusalem the capital of Israel, formalizing its effective annexation. The United Nations Security Council ruled the law "null and void" in United Nations Security Council Resolution 478.

== Background ==
Jordan and an alliance of Arab states rejected the 1947 UN Partition Plan under which Jerusalem was to be a corpus separatum, instead invading former Palestinian Mandate territory, and by the armistice in 1949 was in control of the Old City and East Jerusalem (excluding Mount Scopus). The Arab invading armies failed to take control over the rest of Israel, including West Jerusalem. The city was then divided along the 1949 Armistice Line. East Jerusalem was annexed to Jordan in 1950. The city remained divided until the Six-Day War in 1967.

As part of the Jordanian campaign, on June 5, 1967, the Jordanian army began shelling Israel. When the Israeli cabinet convened to decide how to respond, Yigal Allon and Menahem Begin argued that this was an opportunity to take the Old City of Jerusalem, but Eshkol decided to defer any decision until Moshe Dayan and Yitzhak Rabin could be consulted. During the late afternoon of June 5, the Israelis launched an offensive to encircle Jerusalem, which lasted into the following day. On June 7, heavy fighting ensued. Dayan had ordered his troops not to enter the Old City; however, upon hearing that the UN was about to declare a ceasefire, he changed his mind, and without cabinet clearance, decided to capture it.

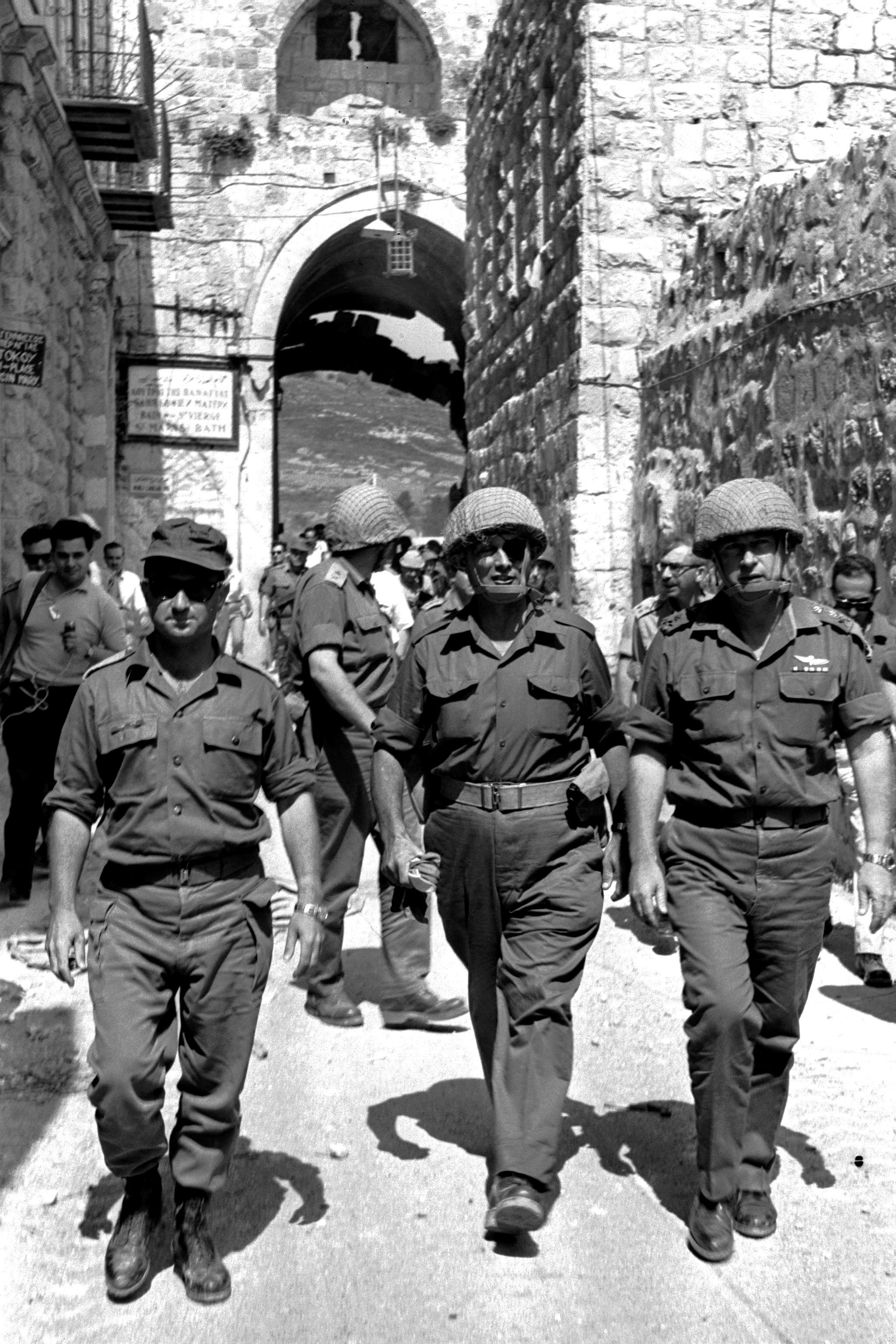
Chief of Staff Lt. Gen. Yitzhak Rabin in the entrance to the old city of Jerusalem during the Six-Day War, with Moshe Dayan and Uzi Narkiss.

== De facto annexation (1967–1980) ==
On 27 June 1967, Israel expanded the municipal boundaries of West Jerusalem so as to include approximately 70 km^{2} (27.0 sq mi) of West Bank territory today referred to as East Jerusalem, which included Jordanian East Jerusalem ( 6 km^{2} (2.3 sq mi) ) and 28 villages and areas of the Bethlehem and Beit Jala municipalities 64 km^{2} (25 sq mi). The government passed legal measures following the occupation to cement the annexation.

Although it was claimed that the application of the Israeli law to East Jerusalem was not annexation, this position was rejected by the Israeli Supreme Court. In a 1970 majority ruling, Justice Y. Kahan expressed the opinion ". . . As far as I am concerned, there is no need for any certificate from the Foreign Minister or from any administrative authority to determine that East Jerusalem. . . was annexed to the State of Israel and constitutes part of its territory. . . by means of these two enactments and consequently this area constitutes part of the territory of Israel."

On 30 July 1980, the Knesset officially approved the Jerusalem Law, which called the city the complete and united capital of Israel.

== Impact ==
Under Jordanian rule no Jews were permitted to live in the city, which was governed as part of the Jordanian rule West Bank, and the Christian population plummeted, falling from 25,000 to 9,000.

Freedom of worship by members of all faiths was restored immediately following reunification. The narrow, approximately 120 square metres (1,300 sq ft) pre-1948 alley along the wall used informally for Jewish prayer was enlarged to 2,400 square metres (26,000 sq ft), with the entire Western Wall Plaza covering 20,000 square metres (4.9 acres). The Mugrabi Quarter was bulldozed in order to expand the plaza. In later years, synagogues demolished during the Jordanian rule, including the Hurva Synagogue were rebuilt.

Under the direction of Nahman Avigad, the city's Jewish Quarter, which had largely lain in rubble, was carefully excavated before being rebuilt. The complete rebuilding of the city's historic Jewish Quarter offered a virtually blank slate for city planners. The reunification is celebrated by the annual Jerusalem Day, and Israeli national holiday. Special celebrations in 2017 to marked the Jubilee of the 1967 reunification.

== International reaction ==
General Assembly Resolutions 2253 and 2254 of July 4 and 14, 1967, respectively, considered Israeli activity in Eastern Jerusalem illegal and asked Israel to cancel those activities and especially not to change the features of the city. On 21 May 1968, United Nations Security Council Resolution 252 invalidated legal and administrative measures by Israel in violation of UNGA Resolutions 2253 and 2254 and required those measures be rescinded.

UN criticism since 1967 includes UNSC resolutions in addition to 252, 267 (1969), 298 (1971) and resolution 476 (1980), regretting changes in the characteristics of Jerusalem, and resolution 478 (1980), where UN Member States were asked to withdraw their embassies from the city. Resolution 478 also "condemned in "the strongest terms" the enactment of Israeli law proclaiming a change in status of Jerusalem" while Resolution 2334 of 2016 condemned all Israeli settlements in occupied territory, including East Jerusalem.

== See also ==
- Positions on Jerusalem
- United Nations Security Council Resolution 271
- United Nations Security Council Resolution 465
- United Nations General Assembly Resolution ES-10/19
