= Jerusalem Law =

1980 Israeli law declaring united West and East Jerusalem as its capital

Jerusalem Law (Hebrew: חוֹק יְסוֹד: יְרוּשָׁלַיִם בִּירַת יִשְׂרָאֵל, Arabic: قانون القدس) is a common name of Basic Law: Jerusalem, Capital of Israel passed by the Knesset on 30 July 1980.

Although the law did not use the term, the Israeli Supreme Court interpreted the law as an effective annexation of East Jerusalem. The United Nations Security Council condemned the attempted change in status to Jerusalem and ruled the law "null and void" in United Nations Security Council Resolution 478.

== History ==
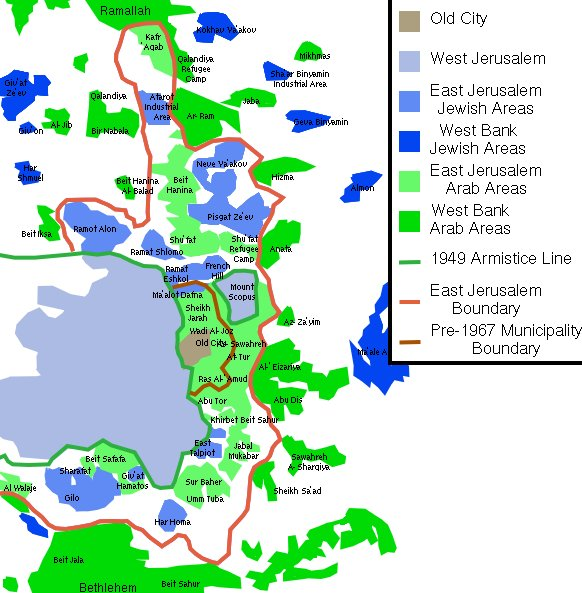
Map indicating East Jerusalem boundary

On 27 June 1967, shortly after the Six-Day War, Israel expanded the municipal boundaries of West Jerusalem so as to include approximately 70 km^{2} (27.0 sq mi) of West Bank territory today referred to as East Jerusalem, which included Jordanian East Jerusalem ( 6 km^{2} (2.3 sq mi) ) and 28 villages and areas of the Bethlehem and Beit Jala municipalities 64 km^{2} (25 sq mi). On 30 July 1980, the Knesset officially approved the Jerusalem Law, which called the city the complete and united capital.

Although it was claimed that the application of the Israeli law to East Jerusalem was not annexation, this position was rejected by the Israeli Supreme Court. In a 1970 majority ruling, Justice Y. Kahan expressed the opinion:

"... As far as I am concerned, there is no need for any certificate from the Foreign Minister or from any administrative authority to determine that East Jerusalem ... was annexed to the State of Israel and constitutes part of its territory ... by means of these two enactments and consequently this area constitutes part of the territory of Israel."

The Jerusalem Law began as a private member's bill proposed by Geulah Cohen, whose original text stated that "the integrity and unity of greater Jerusalem (Yerushalayim rabati) in its boundaries after the Six-Day War shall not be violated." However, this clause was dropped after the first reading in the Knesset. As the Knesset thus declined to specify boundaries and did not use the words "annexation" or "sovereignty", Ian Lustick writes that "The consensus of legal scholars is that this action added nothing to the legal or administrative circumstance of the city, although, especially at the time, its passage was considered to have political importance and sparked a vigorous protest reaction from the world community."

General Assembly Resolutions 2253 and 2254 of 4 and 14 July 1967, respectively, considered Israeli activity in Eastern Jerusalem illegal and asked Israel to cancel those activities and especially not to change the features of the city. On 21 May 1968, United Nations Security Council Resolution 252 invalidated legal and administrative measures by Israel in violation of UNGA Resolutions 2253 and 2254 and required those measures be rescinded. UN criticism since 1967 includes UNSC resolutions in addition to 252, 267 (1969), 298 (1971) and resolution 476 (1980), regretting changes in the characteristics of Jerusalem, and resolution 478 (1980), where UN Member States were asked to withdraw their embassies from the city. Resolution 478 also "condemned in "the strongest terms" the enactment of Israeli law proclaiming a change in status of Jerusalem." while Resolution 2334 of 2016 condemned all Israeli settlements in occupied territory including East Jerusalem. However, thirty-eight years later the United States relocated their Israeli embassy from Tel Aviv to Jerusalem on 14 May 2018, with nine other countries following suit in the years since, most recently Colombia in October 2026.

Although the law was not proposed by the governing coalition or Prime Minister Menachem Begin, rather, it was proposed by lawmakers concerned that peace negotiators were demanding that Arab residents of East Jerusalem be given votes in Palestinian Authority elections. As legislation, the Act is regarded as largely symbolic. An amendment in 2000 further specified the jurisdiction of the law, that included East Jerusalem. It actually did not change its range. The amendment also prohibited transfer of authority to a foreign body, for example an international regime.

== Text of the law ==
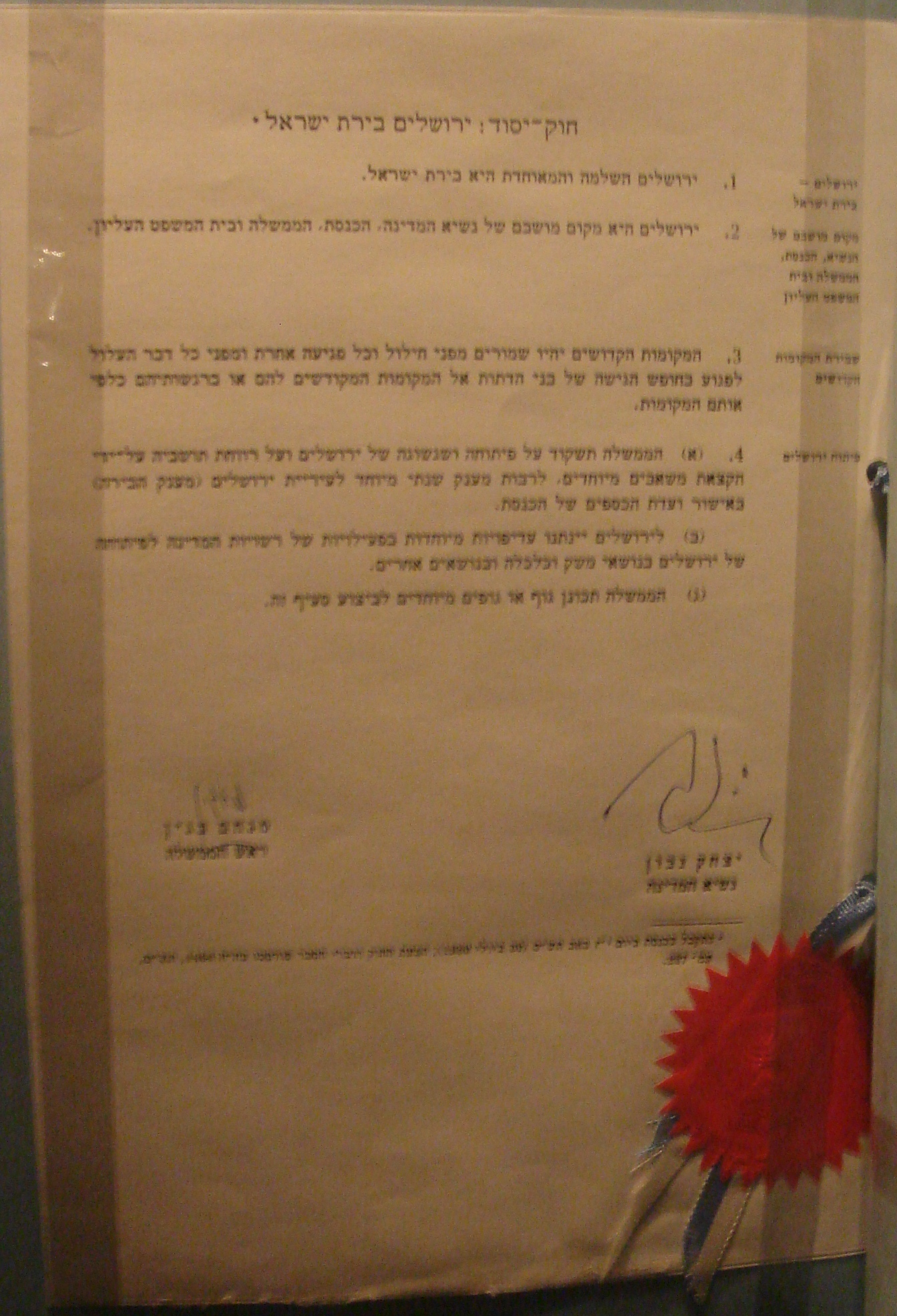
The Basic Law: Jerusalem, Capital of Israel.

Basic Law: Jerusalem, Capital of Israel (unofficial translation)

Jerusalem, Capital of Israel:

1. Jerusalem, complete and united, is the capital of Israel.

Seat of the President, the Knesset, the Government and the Supreme Court:

2. Jerusalem is the seat of the President of the State, the Knesset, the Government and the Supreme Court.

Protection of Holy Places:

3. The Holy Places shall be protected from desecration and any other violation and from anything likely to violate the freedom of access of the members of the different religions to the places sacred to them or their feelings towards those places.

Development of Jerusalem:

4. (a) The Government shall provide for the development and prosperity of Jerusalem and the well-being of its inhabitants by allocating special funds, including a special annual grant to the Municipality of Jerusalem (Capital City Grant) with the approval of the Finance Committee of the Knesset. (b) Jerusalem shall be given special priority in the activities of the authorities of the State so as to further its development in economic and other matters. (c) The Government shall set up a special body or special bodies for the implementation of this section.

Amendment no. 1 (passed by the Knesset on 27 November 2000):

Area of the jurisdiction of Jerusalem

5. The jurisdiction of Jerusalem includes, as pertaining to this basic law, among others, all of the area that is described in the appendix of the proclamation expanding the borders of municipal Jerusalem beginning the 20th of Sivan 5727 (28 June 1967), as was given according to the Cities' Ordinance.

Prohibition of the transfer of authority

6. No authority that is stipulated in the law of the State of Israel or of the Jerusalem Municipality may be transferred either permanently or for an allotted period of time to a foreign body, whether political, governmental or to any other similar type of foreign body.

Entrenchment

7. Clauses 5 and 6 shall not be modified except by a Basic Law passed by a majority of the members of the Knesset.

Menachem Begin Prime Minister

Yitzchak Navon President of the State"

Published in Sefer Ha-Chukkim No. 980 of the 23rd Av, 5740 (5 August 1980), p. 186; the Bill and an Explanatory Note were published in Hatza'ot Chok No. 1464 of 5740, p. 287.

== See also ==
- Positions on Jerusalem
- United Nations Security Council Resolution 271
- United Nations Security Council Resolution 465
- United Nations General Assembly resolution ES-10/L.22
- International law and the Arab-Israeli conflict
- Annexation of Crimea by the Russian Federation, another illegal annexation under international law
