= United Nations Security Council Resolution 478 =

United Nations condemnation of Israel's attempted annexation of Jerusalem

UN Security Council Resolution 478
- The Middle East.
- Date: 20 August 1980
- Meeting no.: 2,245
- Code: S/RES/478 (Document)
- Subject: Territories occupied by Israel
- Voting summary: 14 voted for; None voted against; 1 abstained
- Result: Adopted

Security Council composition
- Permanent members: China; France; Soviet Union; United Kingdom; United States
- Non-permanent members: Bangladesh; East Germany; Jamaica; Mexico; Niger; Norway; Philippines; Portugal; Tunisia; Zambia

United Nations Security Council Resolution 478, adopted on 20 August 1980, is the last of seven UNSC resolutions condemning Israel's annexation of East Jerusalem. UNSC res 478 notes Israel's non-compliance with United Nations Security Council Resolution 476 and condemned Israel's 1980 Jerusalem Law which declared Jerusalem to be Israel's "complete and united" capital, as a violation of international law. The resolution states that the council will not recognize this law, and calls on member states to accept the decision of the council. This resolution also calls upon member states to withdraw their diplomatic missions from the city. The UNSC resolutions followed two General Assembly resolutions regarding Israel's actions in East Jerusalem.

The resolution was passed with 14 votes to none against, with the United States abstaining.

== Reception and criticism ==
Israel categorically rejected the resolution and its Foreign Ministry announced: "It will not undermine the status of Jerusalem as the capital of a sovereign Israel and as a united city which will never again be torn apart."

In remarks made to the council, then-U.S. Secretary of State Edmund Muskie said: "The question of Jerusalem must be addressed in the context of negotiations for a comprehensive, just and lasting Middle East peace."

The draft resolution before us today is illustrative of a preoccupation which has produced this series of unbalanced and unrealistic texts on Middle East issues. It fails to serve the goal of all faiths that look upon Jerusalem as holy. We must share a common vision of that ancient city's future—an undivided Jerusalem, with free access to the Holy Places for people of all faiths.

With respect to the section of the draft resolution relating to the transfer of embassies from Jerusalem, the Secretary of State said that the resolution was "fundamentally flawed" and that the U.S. considered that the instruction that states remove their diplomatic missions from Jerusalem, "not binding" and "without force", and that "we reject it as a disruptive attempt to dictate to other nations." He also said that the United States would forcefully resist any attempt to impose sanctions on Israel under Chapter VII of the Charter.

Shlomo Slonim said that despite its forceful tone, Muskie's statement did not really elucidate the American position on Jerusalem. It made no reference to Jerusalem as an occupied territory, but neither did it deny such a status. He noted that America's policy regarding Jerusalem at the end of 1980 continued to be marked by a considerable degree of ambiguity and confusion.

== Decisions regarding illegal situations ==
Two of the decisions contained in the resolution concerned the illegality of the Basic Law Jerusalem and violations of the Geneva Convention which are regarded as serious violations of customary international law. The Repertory of Practice of United Nations Organs is a legal publication, which analyzes and records the decisions of the UN organs. It states that the decisions were adopted by the Security Council acting on behalf of the members under Article 24. Although they were not adopted under Chapter VII of the Charter, the organization considers determinations regarding illegal situations to be binding upon all of its members. The Repertory says: "The question whether Article 24 confers general powers on the Security Council ceased to be a subject of discussion following the advisory opinion of the International Court of Justice rendered on 21 June 1971 in connection with the question of Namibia (ICJ Reports, 1971, page 16)."

The subsequent advisory opinion of the International Court of Justice expressed the view that all States are under an obligation not to recognize the illegal situation in and around East Jerusalem.

Most nations with embassies in Jerusalem relocated their embassies to Tel Aviv, Ramat Gan or Herzliya following the adoption of Resolution 478. Following the withdrawals of Costa Rica and El Salvador in August 2006, no country maintained its embassy in Jerusalem until May 2018. Following President Trump's announcement in December 2017, the United States relocated their embassy from Tel Aviv to Jerusalem on 14 May 2018.

== Full text of Resolution 478 ==
The Security Council,

Recalling its resolution 476 (1980),

Reaffirming again that the acquisition of territory by force is inadmissible,

Deeply concerned over the enactment of a "basic law" in the Israeli Knesset proclaiming a change in the character and status of the Holy City of Jerusalem, with its implications for peace and security,

Noting that Israel has not complied with resolution 476 (1980),

Reaffirming its determination to examine practical ways and means, in accordance with the relevant provisions of the Charter of the United Nations, to secure the full implementation of its resolution 476 (1980), in the event of non-compliance by Israel,

1. Censures in the strongest terms the enactment by Israel of the "basic law" on Jerusalem and the refusal to comply with relevant Security Council resolutions;

2. Affirms that the enactment of the "basic law" by Israel constitutes a violation of international law and does not affect the continued application of the Geneva Convention relative to the Protection of Civilian Persons in Time of War, of 12 August 1949, in the Palestinian and other Arab territories occupied since June 1967, including Jerusalem;

3. Determines that all legislative and administrative measures and actions taken by Israel, the occupying Power, which have altered or purport to alter the character and status of the Holy City of Jerusalem, and in particular the recent "basic law" on Jerusalem, are null and void and must be rescinded forthwith;

4. Affirms also that this action constitutes a serious obstruction to achieving a comprehensive, just and lasting peace in the Middle East;

5. Decides not to recognize the "basic law" and such other actions by Israel that, as a result of this law, seek to alter the character and status of Jerusalem and calls upon:

(a) All Member States to accept this decision;

(b) Those States that have established diplomatic missions at Jerusalem to withdraw such missions from the Holy City;

6. Requests the Secretary-General to report to the Security Council on the implementation of the present resolution before 15 November 1980;

7. Decides to remain seized of this serious situation.

Adopted at the 2245th meeting by 14 votes to none, with 1 abstention (United States of America).

== See also ==
- Jerusalem Embassy Act
- Israeli–Palestinian conflict
- List of United Nations Security Council Resolutions 401 to 500 (1976–1982)
- Positions on Jerusalem
- United Nations General Assembly resolution ES-10/L.22
- United Nations Security Council Resolution 252
- United Nations Security Council Resolution 267
- United Nations Security Council Resolution 271
- United Nations Security Council Resolution 298
- United Nations Security Council Resolution 465
- United Nations Security Council Resolution 476
