= United Nations Security Council Resolution 465 =

UN Security Council Resolution 465
- Palestinian territories
- Date: 1 March 1980
- Meeting no.: 2,203
- Code: S/RES/465 (Document)
- Subject: Territories occupied by Israel
- Voting summary: 15 voted for; None voted against; None abstained
- Result: Adopted

Security Council composition
- Permanent members: China; France; Soviet Union; United Kingdom; United States
- Non-permanent members: Bangladesh; East Germany; Jamaica; Mexico; Niger; Norway; Philippines; Portugal; Tunisia; Zambia

United Nations Security Council resolution 465, adopted unanimously on 1 March 1980, was on the issue of the Israeli settlements and administration in "the Arab territories occupied since 1967, including Jerusalem", referring to the Palestinian territories of the West Bank including East Jerusalem and the Gaza Strip as well as the Syrian Golan Heights.

== Content ==
After noting a report by the Security Council Commission established in Resolution 446 (1979), the council accepted and commended its work while criticising Israel for not cooperating with it. It expressed concern at Israeli settlement policy in the Arab territories and recalled resolutions 237 (1967), 252 (1968), 267 (1969), 271 (1969) and 298 (1971). It further called upon the state and people of Israel to dismantle such settlements.

The resolution continued by condemning Israel for prohibiting the travel of the Mayor of Hebron, Fahd Qawasma, to the security council, requesting it allow him travel to the United Nations Headquarters. It then ends by asking the commission to continue investigating the situation in the occupied territories with regard to depleted natural resources, while monitoring the implementation of the current resolution, asking it to report back to the council by 1 September 1980.

The resolution calls on all states 'not to provide Israel with any assistance to be used specifically in connection with settlements in the occupied territories'.

== U.S. support ==
U.S. Ambassador to the UN Donald McHenry stated in the security Council immediately after the vote that the U.S. considered the resolution recommendatory and not binding. On 3 March 1980 President Carter clarified the US's position saying dismantling Israeli settlements is "neither proper nor practical" and that "Jerusalem should be undivided" with its status determined in peace negotiations. He further said the US approved the vote with the understanding that all references to Jerusalem were to be removed. In a statement to the United States Senate Committee on Foreign Relations on 20 March 1980 Secretary of State Cyrus Vance accepted "full responsibility for the misunderstanding.

== See also ==
- Israeli–Palestinian conflict
- List of United Nations Security Council Resolutions 401 to 500 (1976–1982)
- United Nations Security Council Resolution 2334
