= United Nations Security Council Resolution 476 =

UN Security Council Resolution 476
- Middle East
- Date: 30 June 1980
- Meeting no.: 2,242
- Code: S/RES/476 (Document)
- Subject: Territories occupied by Israel
- Voting summary: 14 voted for; None voted against; 1 abstained
- Result: Adopted

Security Council composition
- Permanent members: China; France; Soviet Union; United Kingdom; United States
- Non-permanent members: Bangladesh; East Germany; Jamaica; Mexico; Niger; Norway; Philippines; Portugal; Tunisia; Zambia

United Nations Security Council resolution 476, adopted on 30 June 1980, declared that "all legislative and administrative measures and actions taken by Israel, the occupying Power, which purport to alter the character and status of the Holy City of Jerusalem have no legal validity and constitute a flagrant violation of the Fourth Geneva Convention".

The resolution was adopted by 14 votes to none, with the United States abstaining.

== See also ==
- Israeli–Palestinian conflict
- List of United Nations Security Council Resolutions 401 to 500 (1976–1982)
- Status of Jerusalem
