= United Nations Security Council Resolution 271 =

UN Security Council Resolution 271
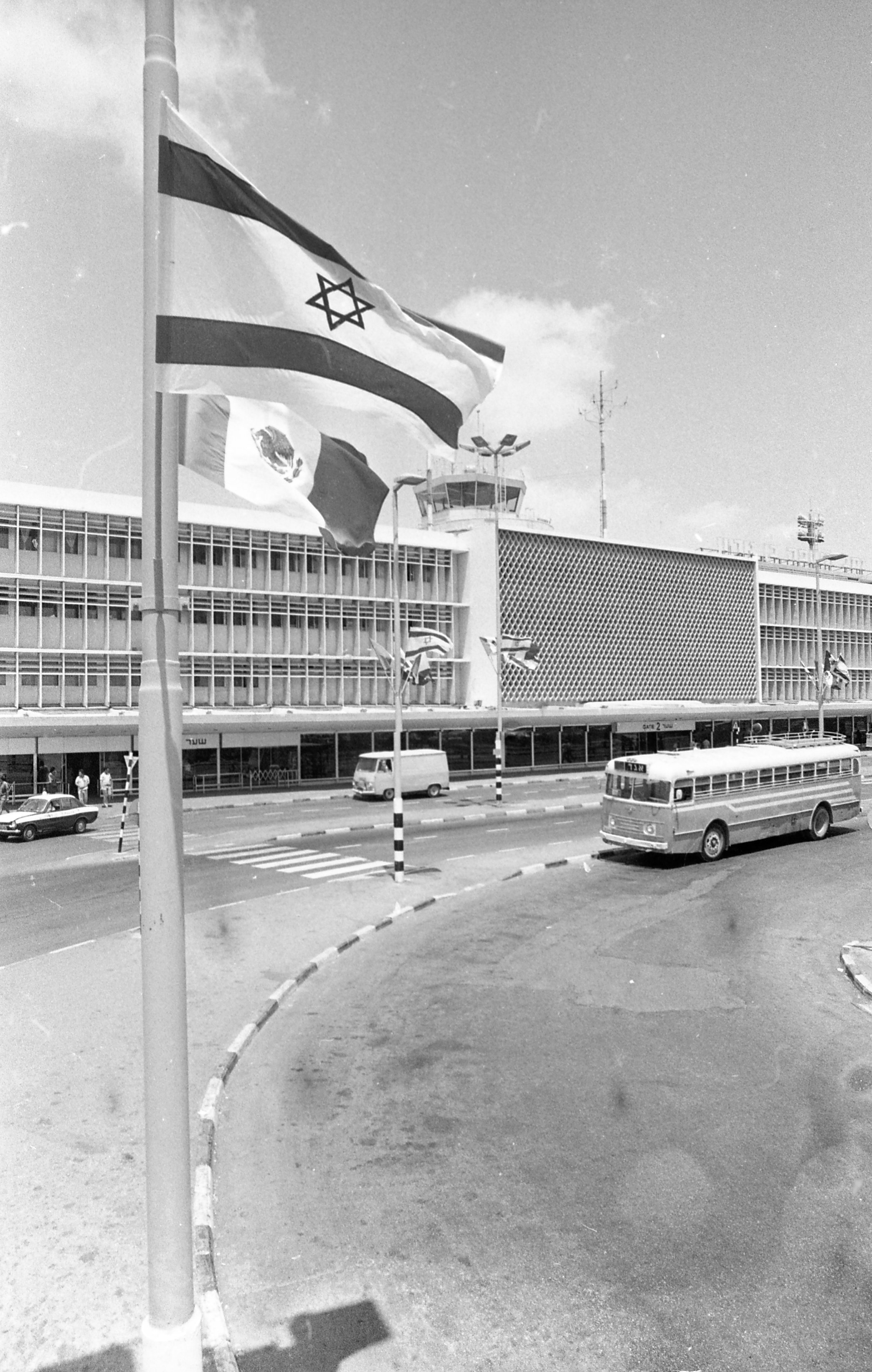
- Israel flag
- Date: September 15 1969
- Meeting no.: 1,512
- Code: S/RES/271 (Document)
- Subject: The situation in the Middle East
- Voting summary: 11 voted for; None voted against; 4 abstained
- Result: Adopted

Security Council composition
- Permanent members: China; France; Soviet Union; United Kingdom; United States
- Non-permanent members: Algeria; Colombia; Finland; Hungary; Nepal; Pakistan; Paraguay; Senegal; Spain; Zambia

United Nations Security Council Resolution 271, a resolution adopted on September 15, 1969, in response to an arson attack on the Jami'a Al-Aqsa in Jerusalem by Denis Michael Rohan, the Council grieved at the extensive damage caused by the arson. The Council determined that the execrable act only highlighted Israel's need to respect previous UN Resolutions and condemned Israel for failing to do so.

The resolution was adopted by 11 votes to none; Colombia, Finland, Paraguay and the United States abstained.

== See also ==
- Arab–Israeli conflict
- List of United Nations Security Council Resolutions 201 to 300 (1965–1971)
