= United Nations Security Council Resolution 267 =

UN Security Council Resolution 267
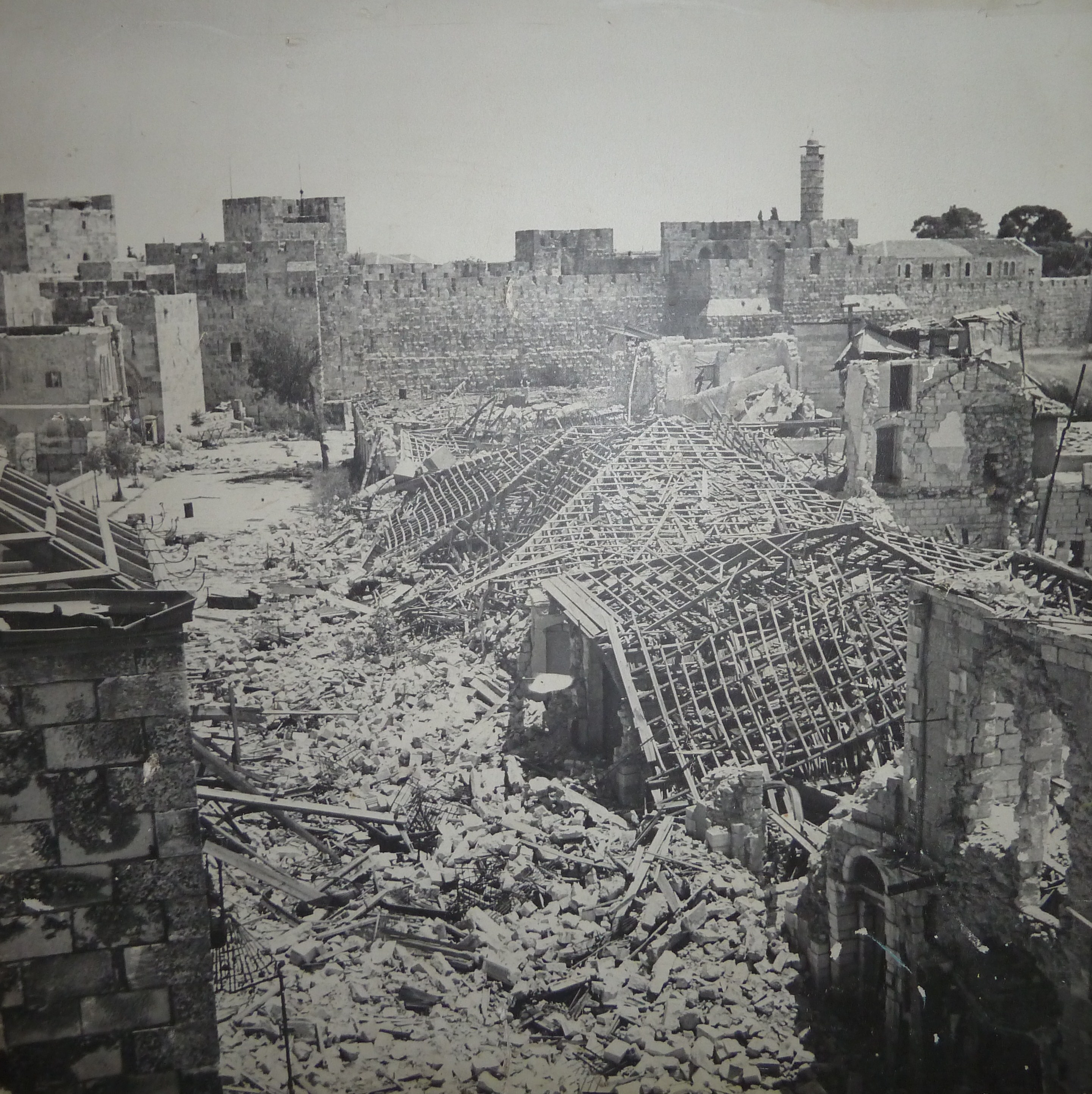
- Jerusalem border
- Date: July 3 1969
- Meeting no.: 1,485
- Code: S/RES/267 (Document)
- Subject: The situation in the Middle East
- Voting summary: 15 voted for; None voted against; None abstained
- Result: Adopted

Security Council composition
- Permanent members: China; France; Soviet Union; United Kingdom; United States
- Non-permanent members: Algeria; Colombia; Finland; Hungary; Nepal; Pakistan; Paraguay; Senegal; Spain; Zambia

United Nations Security Council Resolution 267, adopted unanimously on July 3, 1969, after reaffirming resolution 252, calls on Israel to rescind measures of annexation of East Jerusalem. The Council also concluded that in the event of a negative or no response from Israel, it would reconvene to discuss further action.

== See also ==
- Israeli–Palestinian conflict
- List of United Nations Security Council Resolutions 201 to 300 (1965–1971)
