= United Nations Security Council Resolution 298 =

United Nations Security Council resolution

UN Security Council Resolution 298
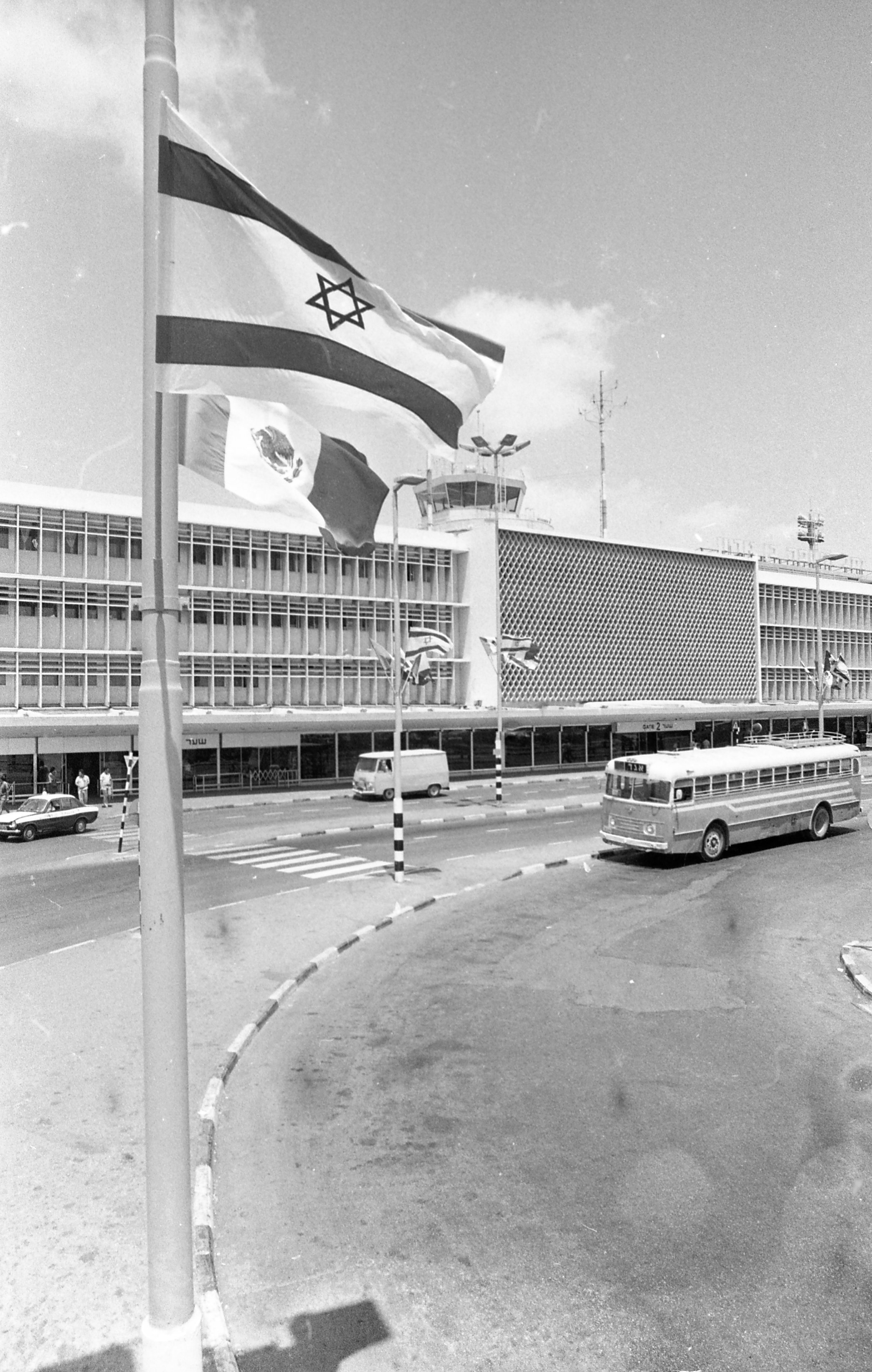
- Israel flag
- Date: September 25 1971
- Meeting no.: 1,582
- Code: S/RES/298 (Document)
- Subject: The situation in the Middle East
- Voting summary: 14 voted for; None voted against; 1 abstained
- Result: Adopted

Security Council composition
- Permanent members: China; France; Soviet Union; United Kingdom; United States
- Non-permanent members: Argentina; Belgium; Burundi; Italy; Japan; Nicaragua; Poland; Sierra Leone; Somalia; Syria

United Nations Security Council Resolution 298, adopted on 25 September 1971, after recalling previous resolutions on the topic, a letter from the representative of Jordan, the reports of the Secretary-General and the statements of the parties concerned, the Council deplored Israel's failure to respect the previous resolutions concerning measures and actions by Israel to affect the status of Jerusalem.

The Council confirmed that all legislative and administrative actions taken by Israel to change the status of Jerusalem aimed at the incorporation of the occupied section are totally invalid and cannot change that status. The Council called on Israel to rescind all previous measures and to take no further steps in attempting to change the status of the city and requested the Secretary-General report to the Council in 60 days on the implementation of the resolution.

The resolution was adopted by 14 votes to none, while the Syrian Arab Republic abstained. UNSC Resolution 298 was also the last resolution affecting Israel which the Republic of China (Taiwan) participated in, with the People's Republic of China taking its place thereafter.

== See also ==
- Israeli–Palestinian conflict
- List of United Nations Security Council Resolutions 201 to 300 (1965–1971)
- Positions on Jerusalem
