= Palestine and the United Nations =

State of Palestine

United Nations membership
- Represented by: State of Palestine
- Membership: Non-member observer state
- Since: November 29, 2012
- Permanent Representative: Riyad Mansour

Issues relating to the State of Palestine and aspects of the Israeli–Palestinian conflict occupy continuous debates, resolutions, and resources at the United Nations. Since its founding in 1948, the United Nations Security Council, as of January 2010, has adopted 79 resolutions directly related to the Arab–Israeli conflict.

The adoption on November 29, 1947, by the United Nations General Assembly of a resolution recommending the adoption and implementation of a plan of partition of Palestine was one of the earliest acts of the United Nations. This followed the report of the United Nations Special Committee on Palestine. Since then, it has maintained a central role in this region, especially by providing support for Palestinian refugees via the United Nations Relief and Works Agency for Palestine Refugees in the Near East (UNRWA; this body is not a totally separate body from the UNHCR, the UN body responsible for all other refugees in the world) by providing a platform for Palestinian political claims via the Committee on the Exercise of the Inalienable Rights of the Palestinian People, the United Nations Division for Palestinian Rights, the Special Committee to Investigate Israeli Practices Affecting the Human Rights of the Palestinian People, the United Nations Information System on the Question of Palestine (UNISPAL) and the International Day of Solidarity with the Palestinian People. The UN has sponsored several peace negotiations between the parties, the latest being the 2002 road map for peace.

== History ==
=== 1940s ===
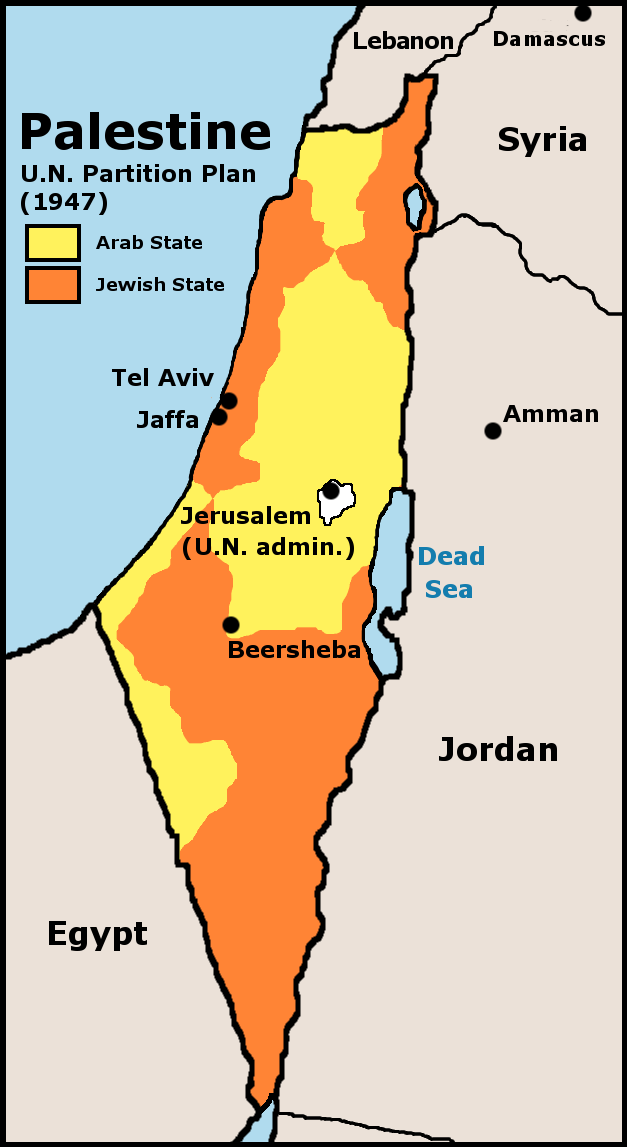
Map showing the 1947 UN partition plan for Palestine in UNGA Res. 181(II)

Following World War II and the establishment of the United Nations, the General Assembly resolved that a Special Committee be created "to prepare for consideration at the next regular session of the Assembly a report on the question of Palestine." It would consist of the representatives of Australia, Canada, Czechoslovakia, Guatemala, India, Iran, Netherlands, Peru, Sweden, Uruguay and Yugoslavia. In the final report of September 3, 1947, seven members of the Committee in Chapter VI "expressed themselves, by recorded vote, in favor of the Plan of Partition with Economic Union" (reproduced in the Report). The Plan proposed "an independent Arab State, an independent Jewish State, and the City of Jerusalem". On November 29, 1947, the General Assembly recommended the adoption and implementation of a Plan of Partition with Economic Union, General Assembly Resolution 181, a slightly modified version of that proposed by the majority in the Report of September 3, 1947, 33 votes in favor, 13 against, and 10 abstentions. The vote itself, which required a two-thirds majority, was a dramatic affair. It led to celebrations in the streets of Jewish cities but was rejected by the Arab Palestinians and the Arab League.

Within a few days, full scale Jewish–Arab fighting broke out in Palestine. It also led to anti-Jewish violence in Arab countries, and to a Jewish exodus from Arab and Muslim countries. "On May 14, 1948, on the day in which the British Mandate over Palestine expired, the Jewish People's Council gathered at the Tel Aviv Museum, and approved" a "proclamation" which declared "the establishment of a Jewish state in Eretz Israel, to be known as the State of Israel", Resolution 181 also laid the foundation for the creation of an Arab state, but its neighbor states and the Arab League, which rejected all attempts at the creation of a Jewish state, rejected the plan. In the introduction to the cablegram from the Secretary-General of the League of Arab States to the UN Secretary-General on 15 May 1948, the Arab League gave reasons for its "intervention": "On the occasion of the intervention of Arab States in Palestine to restore law and order and to prevent disturbances prevailing in Palestine from spreading into their territories and to check further bloodshed".

The same day, five Arab states invaded and rapidly occupied much of the Arab portion of the partition plan. This war changed the dynamic of the region, transforming a two-state plan into a war between Israel and the Arab world. During this war, resolution 194 reiterated the UN's claim on Jerusalem and resolved in paragraph 11 "that the refugees wishing to return to their homes and live at peace with their neighbors should be permitted to do so at the earliest practicable date". This resolution, accepted immediately by Israel, is the major legal foundation of the Palestinian right of return claim, a major point in peace negotiations. Resolution 194 also called for the creation of the United Nations Conciliation Commission for Palestine. The Arab states initially opposed this resolution, but within a few months, began to change their position, and became the strongest advocates of its refugee and territorial provisions.

In the aftermath of the 1948 war, and conditional on Israel's acceptance and implementation of resolutions 181 and 194, the UN General Assembly voted, with the May 11, 1949 Resolution 273 (III), to admit Israel to UN membership as a "peace-loving country". This resolution reiterated the demands for UN control over Jerusalem and for the return of Palestinian refugees. The vote for resolution 273 was held during the five-month-long Lausanne conference, organized by the UN to reconcile the parties. This conference was largely a failure but was noteworthy as the first proposal by Israel to establish the 1949 armistice line between the Israeli and Arab armies, the so-called green line, as the border of the Jewish state. This line has acquired an after-the-fact international sanction.

Following the failure at Lausanne to settle the problem of the Arab refugees, UNRWA was created with December 1949 resolution 302 (IV) to provide humanitarian aid to this group. The Conciliation Commission for Palestine published its report in October 1950. It is noteworthy as the source of the official number of Palestinian Arab refugees (711,000). It again reiterated the demands for UN control over Jerusalem and for the return of Palestinian refugees.

=== 1950s ===
After the failure of early attempts at resolution, and until 1967, discussion of Israel and Palestine was not as prominent at the UN. Exceptions included border incidents like the Qibya massacre, the passage of Security Council Resolution 95 supporting Israel's position over Egypt's on usage of the Suez Canal, and most prominently the 1956 Suez Crisis.

=== 1960s ===
After months of debate in the Security Council and General Assembly before, during and after the 1967 Six-Day War, United Nations Security Council Resolution 242 was adopted. It became a universally accepted basis for Arab-Israeli and later, Israeli-Palestinian peace negotiations. In it, the Land for peace principle was spelled out. This resolution is one of the most discussed, both within and outside of the UN.

The Six-Day War generated a new wave of Palestinian refugees who could not be included in the original UNRWA definition. From 1991, the UN General Assembly has adopted an annual resolution allowing the 1967 refugees within the UNRWA mandate.

In 1968, the Special Committee to Investigate Israeli Practices Affecting the Human Rights of the Palestinian People was created to investigate Jewish settlements on Palestinian territories. It generates yearly General Assembly resolutions and other documents.

=== 1970s ===
The Israeli–Palestinian conflict gained prominence following the emergence of Palestinian armed groups, especially the Palestine Liberation Organization and the increased political strength of the Arab group as the main suppliers of petroleum to the Western world. At the UN, the Arab group also gained the support of the Eastern Bloc against Israel allied to the US.

In rapid succession, several events brought the Palestinian struggle to the forefront: the 1972 Olympic Munich massacre, the 1973 Yom Kippur War, the ensuing 1973 oil crisis and, in 1975, the beginning of the Lebanese Civil War.

The Geneva Conference of 1973 was an attempt to negotiate a solution to the Arab–Israeli conflict. No comprehensive agreement was reached, and attempts in later years to revive the Conference failed.

On November 13, 1974, Yasser Arafat became the first representative of an entity other than a member state to address the General Assembly. In 1975, the PLO was granted permanent observer status at the General Assembly.

Starting in 1974, Palestinian territories were named "Occupied Arab Territories" in UN documents. In 1982, the phrase "Occupied Palestinian Territories" became the usual name. This phrase was not used at the UN before 1967 when the same territories were under military occupation by Jordan and Egypt.

The Committee on the Exercise of the Inalienable Rights of the Palestinian People was created in 1975 and of the United Nations Division for Palestinian Rights in 1977. Also in 1977, the International Day of Solidarity with the Palestinian People was first celebrated on November 29 the anniversary of resolution 181.

The 1979 Egypt–Israel peace treaty was a landmark event. Egyptian president Anwar Sadat is credited for initiating the process, following the failure of the UN-mediated peace negotiations, notably the Geneva Conference. The secret negotiations at Camp David in 1978 between Sadat, Menachem Begin and Jimmy Carter, and the treaty itself essentially bypassed UN-approved channels. The Camp David Accords (but not the Treaty itself) touch on the issue of Palestinian statehood. Egypt, Israel, and Jordan were to agree on a way to establish elected self-governing authority in the West Bank and Gaza. Egypt and Israel were to find means to resolve the refugee problem.

The General Assembly was critical of the accords. General Assembly Resolution 34/65 (1979) condemned "partial agreements and separate treaties". It said that the Camp David accords had "no validity insofar as they purport to determine the future of the Palestinian people and the Palestinian territories occupied by Israel since 1967". In protest, the General Assembly did not renew the peace-keeping force in the Sinai peninsula, the UNEF II, despite requests by the US, Egypt, and Israel, as stipulated in the treaty. To honor the treaty despite the UN's refusal, the Multinational Force and Observers was created, which has always operated independently of the UN. Egypt was expelled from the Arab League for ten years.

=== 1980s ===
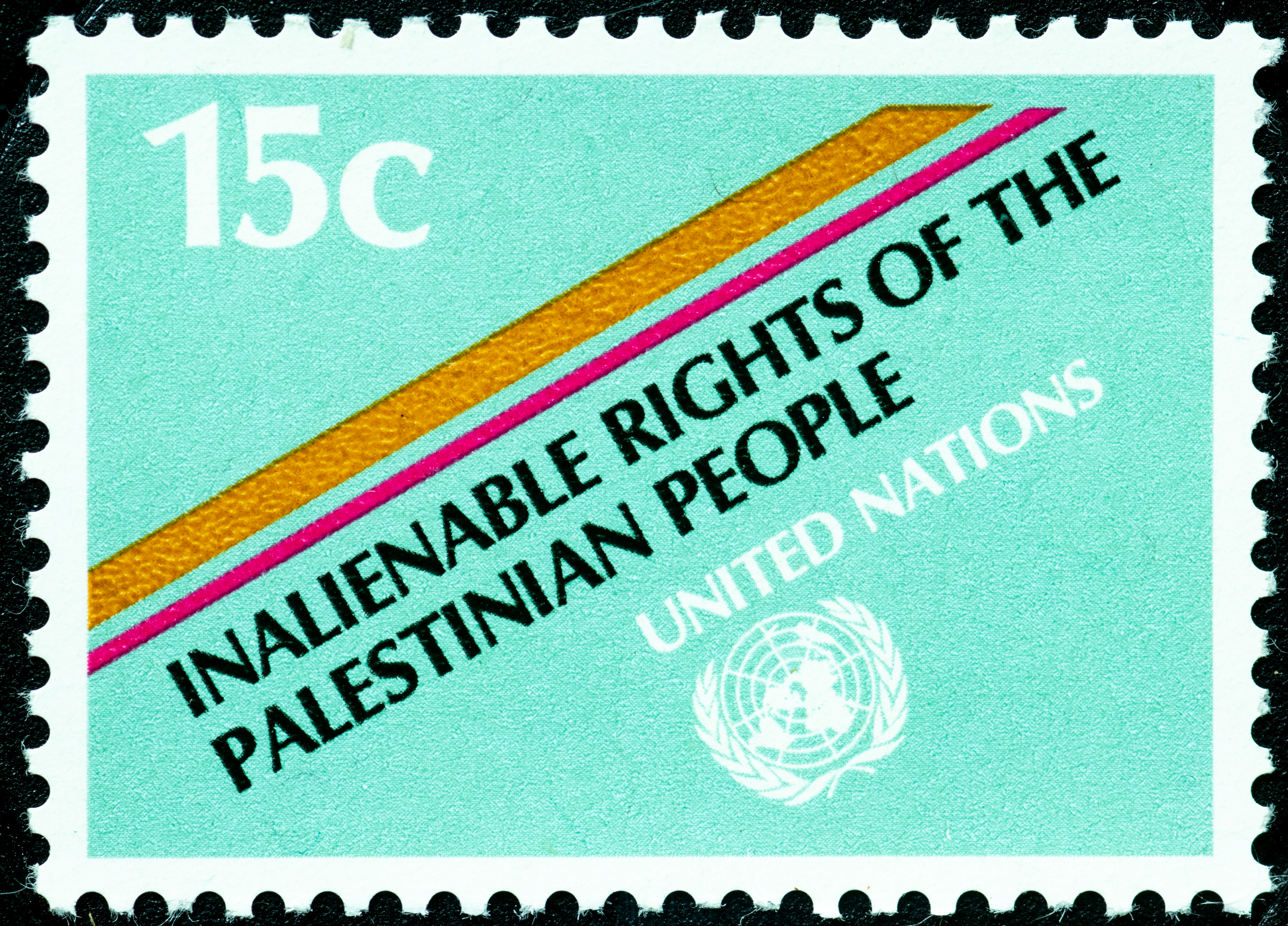
Postage stamp of United Nations honoring the Committee on the Exercise of the Inalienable Rights of the Palestinian People (1981)

The Palestinian National Council adopted in Algiers in 1988 the declaration of independence of the State of Palestine. The UN has not officially recognized this state but, by renaming the PLO observer as the Palestine observer, can be seen as having done so unofficially. In July 1998, the General Assembly adopted resolution 52/250 conferring upon Palestine additional rights and privileges, including the right to participate in the general debate held at the start of each session of the General Assembly, the right of reply, the right to co-sponsor resolutions and the right to raise points of order on Palestinian and Middle East issues.

=== 2000s ===
The year 2000 saw the failure of the Camp David peace negotiations and the beginning of the Second Intifada. In 2003, the Israeli West Bank barrier became another subject of criticism. It was declared illegal by both the General Assembly and the International Court of Justice. The Court found that the portions of the wall beyond the Green Line and the associated regime that had been imposed on the Palestinian inhabitants are illegal. The Court cited illegal interference by the government of Israel with the Palestinian's national right to self-determination; and land confiscations, house demolitions, the creation of enclaves, and restrictions on movement and access to water, food, education, health care, work, and an adequate standard of living in violation of Israel's obligations under international law. The UN Fact-Finding Mission and several UN Rapporteurs subsequently noted that in the movement and access policy there has been a violation of the right not to be discriminated against based on race or national origin.

A series of terrorist attacks in March 2002 prompted Israel to conduct Operation Defensive Shield. The fiercest episode was the Battle of Jenin in the UNRWA administered refugee camp of Jenin, where 75 died (23 IDF soldiers, 38 armed and 14 unarmed Palestinians) and 10% of the camp's buildings destroyed. The UN sends a first visiting mission. A separate fact-finding mission was mandated by the Security Council but blocked by Israel, a move condemned in General Assembly resolution 10/10 (May 2002). This mission was replaced by a report which was widely commented in the media. Many observers noted that the UN dropped the accusations of the massacre made by Palestinians during and soon after the battle, and reproduced in annex 1 of the report.

The Road map for peace is, since 2002, the latest and current effort by the UN to negotiate peace in the region. This document was initially proposed by US president George W. Bush and sponsored by a quartet of the US, Russia, the European Union and the UN. The official text is in the form of a letter to the Security Council, not a General Assembly or Security Council resolution. It generated a series of changes: the sidelining of Yasser Arafat and the unilateral withdrawal of Jewish settlers and the Israeli forces from occupied territories, notably the Gaza Strip. Progress is now stalled.

On December 11, 2007, the General Assembly adopted a resolution on agricultural technology for development sponsored by Israel. The Arab group proposed a series of amendments referring to the Palestinian occupied territories, but these amendments were rejected. The Tunisian representative said: "The Arab Group was convinced that Israel was neither interested in agriculture nor the peace process." This group demanded a vote on the resolution, an unusual demand for this kind of country-neutral resolution. "The representative of the United States (...) expressed disappointment with the request for a recorded vote because that could send a signal that there was no consensus on the issues at stake, which was not the case. The United States was saddened by the inappropriate injection into the agenda item of irrelevant political considerations, characterized by inflammatory remarks that devalued the importance of the United Nations agenda". The resolution was approved by a recorded vote of 118 in favor of none against, with 29 abstentions. The abstentions were mainly from the Arab Group, with the notable exception of Pakistan which voted in favor.

=== 2010–2015 ===
In February 2011, the United States vetoed a draft resolution to condemn all Jewish settlements established in the occupied Palestinian territory since 1967 as illegal. The resolution, which was supported by all other Security Council members and co-sponsored by over 120 nations, would have demanded that "Israel, as the occupying power, immediately and completely ceases all settlement activities in the occupied Palestinian territory, including East Jerusalem and that it fully respect its legal obligations in this regard." The U.S. representative said that while it agreed that the settlements were illegal, the resolution would harm chances for negotiations. Israel's deputy Foreign Minister, Daniel Ayalon, said that the "UN serves as a rubber stamp for the Arab countries and, as such, the General Assembly has an automatic majority," and that the vote "proved that the United States is the only country capable of advancing the peace process and the only righteous one speaking the truth: that direct talks between Israel and the Palestinians are required." Palestinian negotiators, however, have refused to resume direct talks until Israel ceases all settlement activity.

On January 31, 2012, the United Nations independent "International Fact-Finding Mission on Israeli Settlements in the Occupied Palestinian Territory" filed a report stating that Israeli settlements led to a multitude of violations of Palestinian human rights and that if Israel did not stop all settlement activity immediately and begin withdrawing all settlers from the West Bank, it potentially might face a case at the International Criminal Court. It said that Israel violated article 49 of the fourth Geneva convention forbidding transferring civilians of the occupying nation into occupied territory. It held that the settlements are "leading to a creeping annexation that prevents the establishment of a contiguous and viable Palestinian state and undermines the right of the Palestinian people to self-determination." After Palestine's admission to the United Nations as a non-member state in September 2012, it potentially may have its complaint heard by the International Court. Israel refused to co-operate with UNHRC investigators and its foreign ministry replied to the report saying that "Counterproductive measures – such as the report before us – will only hamper efforts to find a sustainable solution to the Israel-Palestinian conflict. The human rights council has sadly distinguished itself by its systematically one-sided and biased approach towards Israel."

=== 2015–2020 and recognition ===
By September 2012, with their application for full membership stalled due to the inability of Security Council members to 'make a unanimous recommendation', the Palestine Authority had decided to pursue an upgrade in status from "observer entity" to "non-member observer state". On November 27 it was announced that the appeal had been officially made, and would be put to a vote in the General Assembly on 29 November, where their status upgrade was expected to be supported by a majority of states. In addition to granting Palestine "non-member observer state status", the draft resolution "expresses the hope that the Security Council will consider favorably the application submitted on 23 September 2011 by the State of Palestine for admission to full membership in the United Nations, endorses the two-state solution based on the pre-1967 borders, and stresses the need for an immediate resumption of negotiations between the two parties."

On Thursday, 29 November 2012, In a 138–9 vote (with 41 abstaining) General Assembly resolution 67/19 adopted, upgrading Palestine to "non-member observer state" status in the United Nations. The new status equates Palestine's with that of the Holy See. The change in status was described by The Independent as "de facto recognition of the sovereign state of Palestine".

External image
- Palestine flag flying at UN

The vote was an important move for the State of Palestine, whilst it was a diplomatic setback for Israel and the United States. Status as an observer state in the UN will allow the State of Palestine to join treaties and specialized UN agencies, such as the International Civil Aviation Organization, the Law of the Seas Treaty and the International Criminal Court. It shall permit Palestine to claim legal rights over its territorial waters and air space as a sovereign state recognized by the UN. It shall also provide Palestine with the right to sue for control of disputed territory in the International Court of Justice and bring war-crimes charges, mainly those relating to Israel's occupation of the State of Palestine, against Israel in the International Criminal Court.

The UN has permitted Palestine to title its representative office to the UN as 'The Permanent Observer Mission of the State of Palestine to the United Nations', and Palestine has started to re-title its name accordingly on postal stamps, official documents and passports, whilst it has instructed its diplomats to officially represent 'The State of Palestine', as opposed to the 'Palestine National Authority'. Additionally, on 17 December 2012, UN Chief of Protocol Yeocheol Yoon decided that "the designation of 'State of Palestine' shall be used by the Secretariat in all official United Nations documents", thus recognizing the PLO-proclaimed State of Palestine as being sovereign over the territories of Palestine and its citizens under international law.

=== 2021–2024 and status upgrade ===
As of 23 September 2025, 157 (81.3%) of the 193 member states of the United Nations have recognized the State of Palestine as sovereign over both West Bank and the Gaza Strip. Many of the countries that do not recognize the State of Palestine nevertheless recognize the PLO as the 'representative of the Palestinian people'.

The effort to secure full UN membership was renewed in 2024 during the Gaza war, with the United Nations Security Council holding a vote on the topic in April. The vote was 12 in favor, with two abstentions, and one against – the United States, which vetoed the measure for two primary reasons. The U.S. argued that Palestinian statehood should be achieved through direct negotiations with Israel rather than unilateral actions, and emphasized the need for significant reforms within the Palestinian Authority, citing long-standing issues of corruption and mismanagement.

On 10 May 2024, the UN General Assembly passed a resolution that recognized that Palestine met the requirements for UN membership, and requested that the Security Council reconsider admitting the state. It also granted Palestine additional rights at the UN, including being seated with member states, the right to introduce proposals and agenda items, and participate in committees, but did not grant them the right to vote. The vote was 143 countries in favour, nine against and 25 abstaining. The upgrades went into effect at the subsequent session of the UN General Assembly on 10 September 2024.

== Resolution 2334 and quarterly reports ==
United Nations Security Council Resolution 2334 of 2016 "Requests the Secretary-General to report to the Council every three months on the implementation of the provisions of the present resolution;" In the first of these reports, delivered verbally at a security council meeting on 24 March 2017, United Nations Special Coordinator for the Middle East Peace Process, Nickolay Mladenov, noted that Resolution 2334 called on Israel to take steps to cease all settlement activity in the Occupied Palestinian Territory, that "no such steps have been taken during the reporting period" and that instead, there had been a marked increase in statements, announcements and decisions related to construction and expansion.

== Annually recurring general assembly resolutions ==
16 resolutions usually voted on annually
| Number | Resolution | Latest | Yes | No | Abstain |
|---|---|---|---|---|---|
| 1 | A/RES/75/20 {{{date}}}. Retrieved November 11, 2026., Committee on the Exercise of the Inalienable Rights of the Palestinian People | 2 December 2020 | 91 | 17 | 54 |
| 2 | A/RES/75/21 {{{date}}}. Retrieved November 11, 2026., Division for Palestinian Rights of the Secretariat | 2 December 2020 | 82 | 25 | 53 |
| 3 | A/RES/75/22 {{{date}}}. Retrieved November 11, 2026., Peaceful settlement of the question of Palestine | 2 December 2020 | 145 | 7 | 9 |
| 4 | A/RES/75/23 {{{date}}}. Retrieved November 11, 2026., Special information programme on the question of Palestine of the Department of Global Communications of the Secretariat | 2 December 2020 | 142 | 8 | 11 |
| 5 | A/RES/75/93 {{{date}}}. Retrieved November 11, 2026., Assistance to Palestine refugees | 10 December 2020 | 169 | 2 | 7 |
| 6 | A/RES/75/94 {{{date}}}. Retrieved November 11, 2026., Operations of the United Nations Relief and Works Agency for Palestine Refugees in the Near East | 10 December 2020 | 162 | 4 | 9 |
| 7 | A/RES/75/95 {{{date}}}. Retrieved November 11, 2026., Palestine refugees' properties and their revenues | 10 December 2020 | 160 | 5 | 12 |
| 8 | A/RES/75/96 {{{date}}}. Retrieved November 11, 2026., Work of the Special Committee to Investigate Israeli Practices Affecting the Human Rights of the Palestinian People and Other Arabs of the Occupied Territories | 10 December 2020 | 76 | 14 | 83 |
| 9 | A/RES/75/97 {{{date}}}. Retrieved November 11, 2026., Israeli settlements in the Occupied Palestinian Territory, including East Jerusalem, and the occupied Syrian Golan | 10 December 2020 | 150 | 7 | 17 |
| 10 | A/RES/75/98 {{{date}}}. Retrieved November 11, 2026., Israeli practices affecting the human rights of the Palestinian people in the Occupied Palestinian Territory, including East Jerusalem | 10 December 2020 | 147 | 10 | 16 |
| 11 | + A/RES/75/126 {{{date}}}. Retrieved November 11, 2026., Assistance to the Palestinian people | 11 December 2020 | *- | - | - |
| 12 | + A/RES/75/172 {{{date}}}. Retrieved November 11, 2026., The right of the Palestinian people to self-determination | 16 December 2020 | 168 | 5 | 10 |
| 13 | + A/RES/75/236 {{{date}}}. Retrieved November 11, 2026., Permanent sovereignty of the Palestinian people in the Occupied Palestinian Territory, including East Jerusalem, and of the Arab population in the occupied Syrian Golan over their natural resources | 21 December 2020 | 153 | 6 | 17 |
| 14 | ++ A/RES/74/84 {{{date}}}. Retrieved November 11, 2026., Persons displaced as a result of the June 1967 and subsequent hostilities | 13 December 2019 | 162 | 6 | 9 |
| 15 | +++ A/RES/73/22 {{{date}}}. Retrieved November 11, 2026., Jerusalem | 30 November 2018 | 148 | 11 | 14 |
| 16 | +++ A/RES/73/97 {{{date}}}. Retrieved November 11, 2026., Applicability of the Geneva Convention relative to the Protection of Civilian Persons in Time of War, of 12August 1949, to the Occupied Palestinian Territory, including East Jerusalem, and the other occupied Arab territories | 7 December 2018 | 154 | 5 | 8 |

+ - Document links will work once the document has been published in the Official Document System. Details can meanwhile be found at the United Nations website.

++ & +++ - 2019 & 2018 data. * - Passed by consensus. Voting records can be examined at the United Nations website.

== Issues ==
=== Emergency Special Sessions ===
Middle East issues were the subject of six of the General Assembly's ten 'emergency special sessions'. The tenth emergency special session has, so far, spanned over 20 years and has become another semi-permanent committee on the question of Palestine.

=== Regional Groups ===
The United Nations Regional Groups were created in 1961. From the onset, the majority of Arab countries within the Asia group blocked the entry of Israel in that group. Thus, for 39 years, Israel was one of the few countries without membership to a regional group and could not participate in most UN activities. On the other hand, Palestine was admitted as a full member of the Asia group on April 2, 1986. (Note: For the purposes of United Nations Regional Groups arrangement, the Palestine Liberation Organization participates in the Asia group since April 2, 1986.)

=== Terrorism ===
The difficulty within the UN to find a unanimous definition of the word terrorism stems in part from the inability to reach consensus over whether Palestinian political violence is a form of resistance or terrorism. The OIC countries argue that Palestinians are fighting the foreign occupation. From the UNODC web site,

The question of a definition of terrorism has haunted the debate among states for decades. (...) The UN Member States still has no agreed-upon definition. (...) The lack of agreement on a definition of terrorism has been a major obstacle to meaningful international countermeasures. Cynics have often commented that one state's "terrorist" is another state's "freedom fighter".

Acts of Palestinian political violence have been repeatedly condemned in press releases from the Secretary-General (e.g.,). The text of General Assembly resolutions does not distinguish terrorism from military operations. For example, in resolution 61/25 (2006) titled "Peaceful Settlement of the Question of Palestine",

condemning all acts of violence and terror against civilians on both sides, including the suicide bombings, the extrajudicial executions and the excessive use of force

Several resolutions recognize the right of Palestinians to fight the Israeli occupation "by all available means". For example, the 2002 UNCHR resolution E/CN.4/2002/L.16 states:

Recalling particularly General Assembly resolution 37/43 of 3 December 1982 reaffirming the legitimacy of the struggle of peoples against foreign occupation by all available means, including armed struggle, (...) 1. Affirms the legitimate right of the Palestinian people to resist the Israeli occupation by all available means to free its land and be able to exercise its right of self-determination and that, by so doing, the Palestinian people is fulfilling its mission, one of the goals and purposes of the United Nations;

Western countries who voted against this 2002 resolution claimed its language condones Palestinian terrorism:

Ms. Gervais-Virdicaire (Canada)(...) 3. The failure of the draft resolution to condemn all acts of terrorism, particularly in the context of recent suicide bombings targeting civilians, was a serious oversight that rendered it fundamentally unacceptable; there could be no justification for terrorist acts. (...) Ms. Glover (United Kingdom) (...) 16. Although her delegation agreed with many of the concerns expressed in the draft resolution, the text contained language which might be interpreted as endorsing violence and condoning terrorism.

The resolution was nevertheless passed in its entirety.

=== Palestinian refugees ===
Refugees are aided by two agencies at the UN, the UNHCR and UNRWA. UNRWA assists Palestinian refugees exclusively. Refugees are defined differently by these two organizations, the main difference being the inclusion of descendants and the inclusion of the 50% of refugees within the Palestinian territories which, by UNHCR criteria, are internally displaced persons.

- In 2006, the UNHCR assisted a total of 17.4 million "Persons of concern" around the world, including 350,000 Palestinians, with a budget of $1.45 billion or $83 per person. The UNHCR was staffed by 6,689.
- In 2006, UNRWA assisted some 4.5 million Palestinian refugees with a regular budget of $639 million supplemented by $145 million for emergency programs, amounting to $174 per person. UNRWA was staffed by 28,000, most refugees themselves.

Andrew Whitley of UNRWA has called the hopes that Palestinian refugees might one day return to their homes "cruel illusions".

=== United States policy at the UN ===
UN diplomats have indicated that the United States would veto any unilateral attempt to declare a Palestinian state at the Security Council. The U.S. has vetoed over forty condemnatory Security Council resolutions against Israel; almost all U.S. vetoes cast since 1988 blocked resolutions against Israel, on the basis of their lack of condemnation of Palestinian terrorist groups, actions, and incitement. This policy, known as the Negroponte doctrine, has drawn both praise and criticism.

Speaking to the UN Security Council in October 2019, US Ambassador to the United Nations Kelly Craft called Hamas "a terrorist organization that oppresses the Palestinian people in Gaza through intimidation and outright violence, while inciting violence against Israel." She condemned as "despicable" Hamas's violence against its own people, its use of Palestinian children as pawns, and its indiscriminate attacks on Israeli civilian areas, and called it one of the greatest obstacles to resolving the Israeli-Palestinian conflict.

=== UN Human Rights Council ===
The Special Rapporteur on the question of Palestine to the previous UNCHR, the current UNHRC, and the General Assembly was, between 2001 and 2008, John Dugard. The mandate of the Rapporteur is to investigate human rights violations by Israel only, not by Palestinians. Dugard was replaced in 2008 with Richard Falk, who has compared Israel's treatment of Palestinians with the Nazis' treatment of Jews during the Holocaust. Like his predecessor, Falk's mandate only covers Israel's human rights record. Commenting on the end of Falk's mandate in May 2014, US delegate Samantha Power accused Falk of "relentless anti-Israeli bias" and "noxious and outrageous perpetuation of 9/11 conspiracy theories."

Miguel d'Escoto Brockmann, a former UNGA president, was elected to the UNHRC Advisory Committee in June 2010.

In March 2012, UNHCR was criticized for facilitating an event featuring a Hamas politician. The Hamas parliamentarian had spoken at an NGO event in the UN Geneva building. Israeli Prime Minister Binyamin Netanyahu castigated the UNHRC's decision stating: "He represents an organization that indiscriminately targets children and grown-ups, and women and men. Innocents – is their special favorite target." Israel's ambassador to the UN, Ron Prosor, denounced the speech, stating that Hamas was an internationally recognized terrorist organization that targeted civilians. "Inviting a Hamas terrorist to lecture to the world about human rights is like asking Charles Manson to run the murder investigation unit at the NYPD", he said.

==== Fact-Finding mission on the 2008 Gaza War (Goldstone report) ====
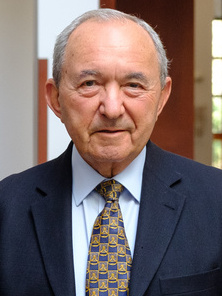
Richard J. Goldstone, a South African, is a former Constitutional Court Judge and lawyer. He led UN Fact-Finding Mission on the 2008–2009 Gaza War.

A fact-finding mission on human rights violations during the 2008 Gaza War between Israel and Hamas administration in Gaza was called by January 12, 2009, UNHRC, which limited the investigation to "violations (...) by the occupying Power, Israel, against the Palestinian people throughout the Occupied Palestinian Territory, particularly in the occupied Gaza Strip" but, before any investigation, it already "Strongly condemns the ongoing Israeli military operation carried out in the Occupied Palestinian Territory, particularly in the occupied Gaza Strip, which has resulted in massive violations of the human rights of the Palestinian people".

Former UN High Commissioner for Human Rights and Ireland President Mary Robinson refused to head the mission because she "felt strongly that the Council's resolution was one-sided and did not permit a balanced approach to determine the situation on the ground." On 3 April 2009, Richard Goldstone was named head of the mission. In a 16 July interview, he said: "at first I was not prepared to accept the invitation to head the mission". "It was essential," he continued, to expand the mandate to include "the sustained rocket attack on civilians in southern Israel, as well as other facts." He set this expansion of the mandate as a condition for chairing the mission. The next day, he wrote in the New York Times "I accepted because the mandate of the mission was to look at all parties: Israel; Hamas, which controls Gaza; and other armed Palestinian groups." The UNHRC press release announcing his nomination documents the changed focus of the mission. Writing in The Spectator, commentator Melanie Phillips said that the resolution that created the mandate allowed no such change and questioned the validity and political motivations of the new mandate.

Israel thought that the change of the mandate did not have much practical effect.

Israel refused to cooperate with the Goldstone Mission and denied its entry to Israel, while Hamas and Palestinian National Authority supported and assisted the Mission.

In January, months before the mission, Professor Christine Chinkin, one of the four mission members, signed a letter to the London Sunday Times, asserting that Israel's actions "amount to aggression, not self-defense" and that "the manner and scale of its operations in Gaza amount to an act of aggression and is contrary to international law". She authored the final report.

Israel concluded that "it seemed clear beyond any doubt that the initiative was motivated by a political agenda and not a concern for human rights" and therefore refused to cooperate with it – in contrast to its policy to cooperate fully with most of the international inquiries into events in the Gaza Operation.

The mission report was published on 15 September 2009. As noted in the press release, the mission concluded "that serious violations of international human rights and humanitarian law were committed by Israel in the context of its military operations in Gaza from December 27, 2008, to January 18, 2009, and that Israel committed actions amounting to war crimes, and possibly crimes against humanity. The Mission also found that Palestinian armed groups had committed war crimes, as well as possibly crimes against humanity."

According to Gal Beckerman, writing for The Forward, Goldstone explained that what he had headed was not an investigation, but a fact-finding mission. "If this was a court of law, there would have been nothing proven", Goldstone said, emphasizing that his conclusion that war crimes had been committed was always intended as conditional. However, Beckerman says that the report "is replete with bold and declarative legal conclusions seemingly at odds with the cautious and conditional explanations of its author."

Reactions to the report's findings were varied. The report was not immediately ratified by a UNHRC resolution. This step was postponed to March 2010. This delay is attributed to diplomatic pressure from Western members of the council, including the US which joined in April 2009 and, surprisingly, from the Palestinian Authority representative. About the U.S. pressure, UNHRC representative Harold Hongju Koh described the U.S. participation to the council as "an experiment" with the Goldstone report being the first test.

The report was finally ratified by 14 October UNHRC resolution A/HRC/S-12/L.1. Like the January 12 resolution but unlike the report, this ratification condemns Israel, not Hamas. The "unbalanced focus" of the ratification was criticized by U.S. State Department spokesman Ian Kelly, U.S. ambassador to the UNHRC Douglas Griffiths and Richard Goldstone himself.

On 1 April 2011, Goldstone retracted his claim that it was Israeli government policy to deliberately target citizens, saying "If I had known then what I know now, the Goldstone Report would have been a different document". On 14 April 2011 the three other co-authors of the United Nations Fact Finding Mission on the Gaza Conflict of 2008–2009, Hina Jilani, Christine Chinkin and Desmond Travers, released a joint statement criticizing Goldstone's recantation of this aspect of the report. They all agreed that the report was valid and that Israel and Hamas had failed to investigate alleged war crimes satisfactorily.

==== Commission of inquiry on the 2014 Gaza War ====
On 23 July 2014, during the 2014 Gaza War, the UNHRC adopted resolution S-21 for a commission of inquiry to "investigate all violations of international humanitarian law and international human rights law in the Occupied Palestinian Territory, including East Jerusalem, particularly in the occupied Gaza Strip, in the context of the military operations conducted since 13 June 2014". The alleged anti-Israel bias in the mandate of the commission was denounced by Gregory J. Wallance in The Guardian and by the US, Canadian and Australian delegates to the UNHRC during the debate of the resolution.

=== Commission on the Status of Women ===
During its 51st session in 2007, the United Nations Commission on the Status of Women said that it

Reaffirms that the Israeli occupation remains a major obstacle for Palestinian women with regard to their advancement, self-reliance and integration in the development planning of their society

A spokeswoman outlined Israel's position on the resolution:

As in previous years, this Commission has before it, once again, a resolution on the sole situation of Palestinian women. In monopolizing attention for Palestinian women and promoting uneven standards, the resolution turns a humanitarian issue into a political one. Hence, it damages the prospects for peace based on mutual respect and understanding.

=== Special Rapporteur on the Right to Food ===
Jean Ziegler, the UN special rapporteur on the right to food, published in October 2003 a report accusing Israel of starving Palestinian children. The Israeli ambassador to the UN demanded that the report be withdrawn and accused its author of abusing his office.

=== UNESCO ===
UNESCO has adopted hundreds of decisions on the access of Palestinians to education. Palestine is the only territory with a yearly decision to this effect. UNESCO also adopts yearly resolutions for the preservation of the old Jerusalem, a UNESCO world heritage site included in the List of World Heritage in Danger.

In 2007, an emergency session of UNESCO was held to discuss Israeli archaeological excavations at the Mughrabi ascent in the Old City of Jerusalem. The session report said that the excavations were "a naked challenge by the Israeli occupation authorities" to the UN position on the status of Jerusalem. Following a fact-finding mission, Israel was exonerated of blame by the executive board.

UNESCO never criticized repeated episodes of mechanized excavations within the Temple Mount ground by the Muslim Waqf, and is financing a museum within the al-Aqsa Mosque compound (the Temple Mount). The museum closed for non-Muslims in 2000.

=== Arab discrimination against Palestinians ===
Many Palestinian refugees are located in Jordan, Syria and Lebanon. In 2003 Amnesty International sent a memorandum to the UN Committee on the Elimination of Racial Discrimination (CERD), expressing concerns about discrimination against Palestinians. CERD responded in 2004, urging the Lebanese government to "take measures to ameliorate the situation of Palestinian refugees ... and at a minimum to remove all legislative provisions and change policies that have a discriminatory effect on the Palestinian population in comparison with other non-citizens."

The violent takeover of Gaza by Hamas in 2007 has, so far, not been condemned at the UN. In November 2007, Ha'aretz reported that the Palestinian Authority observer at the UN, Riad Mansour, had sought to include a clause "expressing concern about the takeover by illegal militias of Palestinian Authority institutions in June 2007" and calling for the reversal of this situation. It reported diplomatic sources as saying that Mansour had been subjected to a barrage of insults, led by the representatives of Egypt, Syria, and Libya. Delegates from some Arab countries had claimed that Mansour's initiative would be interpreted as an official UN condemnation of Hamas, and would gain Israel international legitimacy for cutting electricity and fuel supplies to Gaza. Mansour agreed to softer language expressing "concern about an illegal takeover."

Between May and September 2007, the Nahr al-Bared Palestinian refugee camp in Lebanon became the center of fighting between the Lebanese Internal Security Force and Fatah al-Islam gunmen. The Lebanese Army was supported in this action by Palestinian movements responsible for security in the camp. Bombing by the Lebanese army left the camp in ruins and caused the mass displacement of 27,000 Palestinian refugees to other camps. The UN Security Council issued two statements during the fighting, both condemning Fatah al-Islam and "fully support[ing] the efforts carried out by the Lebanese Government and army to ensure security and stability throughout Lebanon". Khaled Abu Toameh and Jonathan Kay faulted the UN for not condemning the Lebanese Army, arguing that it had condemned Israeli Defense Forces in similar circumstances in the past, namely the Battle of Jenin.

==== UNRWA perpetuating Palestinian refugee status ====
Several observers accuse the UN of promoting this discrimination by creating a special status for Palestinian refugees. A report by the International Federation for Human Rights stated:

Because the UNRWA's position consists of the prospect of a conflict resolution leading to the creation of an independent Palestinian State and to the return of the refugees on that territory, as a definitive solution, it tends to justify the Lebanese policies granting the Palestinian refugees only a minimal legal status. In other words, the Palestinian refugees' rights are limited to the right of residence as a condition of the application of UNRWA's humanitarian assistance.

A 2007 op-ed by Nicole Brackman and Asaf Rominowsky stated:

UNRWA serves as a crucial tool of legitimacy for the Palestinian refugee issue — as long as the office is active, how could anyone question the Palestinian refugee problem? Thus an oxymoronic situation: Despite the Israeli disengagement from Gaza in 2005 and the creation in 1993 of a Palestinian Authority with jurisdiction over the Palestinian refugee camps in Gaza/West Bank, UNRWA remains the key social, medical, educational and professional service provider for Palestinians living in "refugee" camps. This runs contrary to every principle of normal territorial integrity and autonomy.

A similar argument was made by commentators in The Independent and in a 2009 report from the Washington Institute for Near East Policy.

=== Direct involvement of UN personnel in the Israeli–Palestinian conflict ===
There have been occasional reports of UN personnel becoming caught up in hostilities.

On November 22, 2002, during a gun battle between the IDF and Islamic Jihad militants, Iain Hook, UNRWA project manager of the Jenin camp rehabilitation project, was killed by Israeli gunfire. A soldier had reportedly mistaken him for a militant and a cellphone in his hand for a gun or grenade.

On May 11, 2004, Israel said that a UN ambulance had been used by Palestinian militants for their getaway following a military engagement in Southern Gaza,

In 2004, Israel complained about comments made by Peter Hansen, head of UNRWA. Hansen had said that there were Hamas members on the UNRWA payroll and that he did not see that as a crime, they were not necessarily militants, and had to follow UN rules on staying neutral.

In January 2009, during the 2008–2009 Gaza War, many people were killed by Israeli bombing outside a school run by the UNRWA. Initially, the UN accused Israel of directly bombing the school. Maxwell Gaylord, the UN humanitarian coordinator for the Palestinian territories, described the incidents as tragic. Israel claims that a Hamas squad was firing mortar shells from the immediate vicinity of the school. Hamas denies this claim. In February 2009, Gaylord said that the UN "would like to clarify that the shelling and all of the fatalities took place outside and not inside the school". The headquarters of the UNRWA in Gaza was also shelled on January 15. Tons of food and fuel were destroyed. Israel claims that militants ran for safety inside the UN compound after firing on Israeli forces from outside. UNRWA spokesman Chris Gunness dismissed the Israeli claims as "baseless".

In March 2012, UN official Khulood Badawi, an Information and Media Coordinator for the United Nations Office for the Coordination of Humanitarian Affairs, tweeted a picture of a Palestinian child covered in blood captioned the picture with "Another child killed by #Israel... Another father carrying his child to a grave in #Gaza." It was later stated that the picture was published in 2006 and was of a Palestinian girl who had died in an accident unrelated to Israel. Israel's Ambassador to the United Nations Ron Prosor called for her dismissal, stating that she was "directly engaged in spreading misinformation". He accused her conduct as deviating from "the organization's responsibility to remain impartial" and said that such actions "contribute to incitement, conflict and, ultimately, violence." She later tweeted that she mistakenly had tweeted an old photo. Ma'an News Agency reported a week later that the hospital medical report on the dead girl read that she died "due to falling from a high area during the Israeli strike on Gaza". There are differing accounts of how the Israeli airstrike, reported being as little as 100 meters away, may have caused the accident.

== See also ==
- List of United Nations resolutions concerning Palestine
- UN Watch
