= The Origins and Evolution of the Palestine Problem =

- Author: United Nations Division for Palestinian Rights, Committee on the Exercise of the Inalienable Rights of the Palestinian People
- Language: English
- Publisher: United Nations
- Publication date: 1978-2014
- Publication place: United Nations

The Origins and Evolution of the Palestine Problem is a study prepared by the United Nations Division for Palestinian Rights under the guidance of the Committee on the Exercise of the Inalienable Rights of the Palestinian People, as proposed on 2 December 1977 by General Assembly resolution 32/40.

== Objectives ==
The UNGA resolution of 2 December 1977 required a body to be set up to:

(a) Prepare, under the guidance of the Committee on the Exercise of the Inalienable Rights of the Palestinian People, studies and publications relating to:

(i) The inalienable rights of the Palestinian people;
(ii) Relevant resolutions of the General Assembly and other organs of the United Nations;
(iii) The activities of the Committee and other United Nations organs, in order to promote the attainment of those rights;

(b) Promote maximum publicity for such studies and publications through all appropriate means;

(c) Organize in consultation with the Committee, commencing in 1978, the annual observance of 29 November as the International Day of Solidarity with the Palestinian people

The committee subsequently proposed the following principles:

The study should place the problem in its historical perspective, emphasizing the national identity and rights of the Palestinian people. It should survey the course of the problem during the period of the League of Nations Mandate and show how it came before the United Nations. It should also cover the period of United Nations involvement in the problem.

== The Study ==
The study was published in five parts so far, covering the period 1917 to 2000, published at different times.

- Part I (1978), covers the period from 1917 to 1947;
- Part II (1979), covers 1947 to 1977;
- Part III (1984), covers 1978 to 1983;
- Part IV (1990), covers 1984 to 1988;
- Part V (2014), covers 1989 – 2000.

== Online versions ==
- United Nations
