= Israel and the United Nations =

State of Israel

United Nations membership
- Membership: Full member
- Since: 1949
- UNSC seat: Non-permanent
- Permanent Representative: Danny Danon

Issues relating to the State of Israel and aspects of the Arab–Israeli conflict, and more recently the Iran–Israel conflict, occupy repeated annual debate times, resolutions and resources at the United Nations. Since its founding in 1948, the United Nations Security Council, has adopted 79 resolutions directly related to the Arab–Israeli conflict as of January 2010.

The adoption on 29 November 1947, by the United Nations General Assembly of a resolution recommending the adoption and implementation of a plan of partition of Mandatory Palestine was one of the earliest acts of the United Nations. This followed the report of the United Nations Special Committee on Palestine. Since then, it has maintained a central role in this region, including the Special Committee to Investigate Israeli Practices Affecting the Human Rights of the Palestinian People. The UN has sponsored several peace negotiations between the parties, the latest being the 2002 Road map for peace.

== History ==
=== UN Partition Plan for Palestine ===
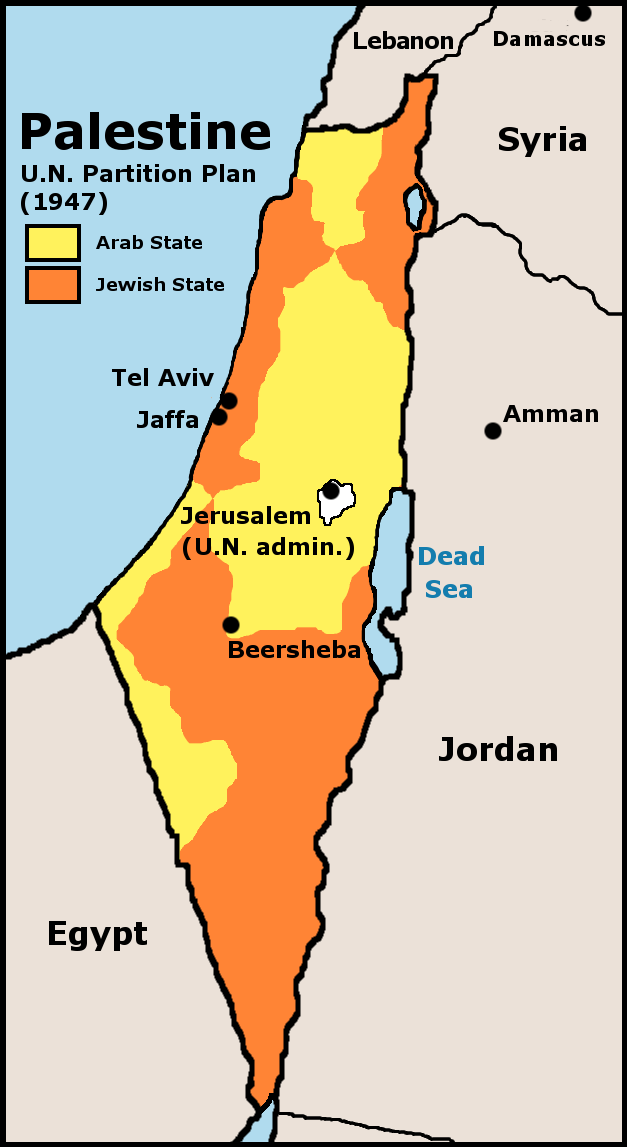
Map showing the 1947 UN partition plan for Palestine in UNGA Res. 181(II)

The United Nations General Assembly on 15 May 1947 created the Special Committee on Palestine (UNSCOP) in response to a United Kingdom government request that the General Assembly "make recommendations under article 10 of the Charter, concerning the future government of Palestine". UNSCOP was "to prepare for consideration at the next regular session of the Assembly a report on the question of Palestine." UNSCOP consisted of representatives of eleven members: Australia, Canada, Czechoslovakia, Guatemala, India, Iran, Netherlands, Peru, Sweden, Uruguay and Yugoslavia. In the final report of 3 September 1947, seven members of the Committee in Chapter VI "expressed themselves, by recorded vote, in favour of the Plan of Partition with Economic Union" (reproduced in the Report). The Plan proposed "an independent Arab State, an independent Jewish State, and the City of Jerusalem". The Palestinian Arabs and members of the Arab League had rejected any partition of Palestine.

On 29 November 1947, the General Assembly passed Resolution 181 (commonly known as the UN Partition Plan for Palestine) which recommended the adoption and implementation of a slightly modified version of the UNSCOP majority Partition Plan, by 33 votes in favor, 13 against, and 10 abstentions, achieving the required two-thirds majority. The resolution was rejected by the Palestinian Arabs; and all members of the Arab League voted against.

=== UN Mediator in Palestine ===
Within a few days of the passing of the Partition Plan (Resolution 181), full scale Jewish–Arab fighting broke out in Palestine. It also led to anti-Jewish violence in Arab countries, and to a Jewish exodus from Arab and Muslim countries. In an attempt to mediate the continuing Jewish–Arab fighting in Palestine, UN General Assembly by Resolution 186 of 14 May 1948 called for the appointment of "United Nations Mediator in Palestine".

Also on 14 May 1948, the day on which the British Mandate of Palestine was to expire, Israel declared "the establishment of a Jewish state in Eretz Israel, to be known as the State of Israel". The territory of Israel was to be that of the Jewish State proposed in Resolution 181. On the day after the British Mandate expired, on 15 May, five neighbouring Arab states invaded and rapidly occupied much of the Arab portion of the Partition Plan, and threatening to take the whole of Palestine. In the introduction to the cablegram from the Secretary-General of the League of Arab States to the UN Secretary-General on 15 May 1948, the Arab League gave reasons for its "intervention": "On the occasion of the intervention of Arab States in Palestine to restore law and order and to prevent disturbances prevailing in Palestine from spreading into their territories and to check further bloodshed". The invasion changed the dynamic of the region, transforming a two-state plan into a war between Israel and the Arab world.

Folke Bernadotte was appointed Mediator on 20 May 1948. Bernadotte succeeded in achieving a truce by May–June 1948 during which the British evacuated Palestine. He proposed two alternate partition plans, the second calling for a reduction in the size of the Jewish State and loss of sovereignty over the harbour city of Haifa. Both were rejected. Lehi, a Zionist group, assassinated him and his aide, UN observer Colonel André Serot on 17 September 1948. Bernadotte was succeeded by Ralph Bunche, who was successful in bringing about the signing of the 1949 Armistice Agreements.

=== Resolution 194 – Status of Jerusalem and refugees ===
On 11 December 1948, Resolution 194 reiterated the UN's claim on Jerusalem and resolved in paragraph 11 "that the refugees wishing to return to their homes and live at peace with their neighbours should be permitted to do so at the earliest practicable date". This resolution, accepted immediately by Israel, is the foundation of the claim of a Palestinian right of return. The Arab states initially opposed this resolution, but within a few months, began to change their position, and became the strongest advocates of its refugee and territorial provisions.

Resolution 194 also called for the creation of the United Nations Conciliation Commission for Palestine (UNCCP), consisted of France, Turkey and the United States. UNCCP proposed the Lausanne Conference of 1949. The conference lasted five months and was unsuccessful. After the failure of the conference, the UNCCP continued for some more years, but did not achieve any significant success. But the conference was noteworthy as the first proposal by Israel to establish the 1949 armistice line between the Israeli and Arab armies, the so-called green line, as the border of the Jewish state. This line has acquired an after-the-fact international sanction.

Following the failure at Lausanne to settle the problem of Palestinian refugees, UNRWA was created by resolution 302 (IV) of December 1949 to provide humanitarian aid to this group.

The UNCCP published its report in October 1950. It is noteworthy as the source of the official number of Palestinian Arab refugees (711,000). It again reiterated the demands for UN control over Jerusalem and for the return of Palestinian refugees.

=== Membership of United Nations ===
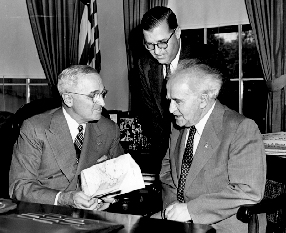
Abba Eban (center) with Israeli prime minister David Ben-Gurion and US president Harry S. Truman. Eban was the first Israeli permanent representative to the United Nations.

On the declaration of independence, a Provisional government of Israel was established; and while military operations were still in progress, the Provisional government was promptly recognised by the United States as the de facto authority of Israel, followed by Iran (which had voted against the UN partition plan), Guatemala, Iceland, Nicaragua, Romania, and Uruguay. The Soviet Union was the first country to recognise Israel de jure on 17 May 1948, followed by Poland, Czechoslovakia, Yugoslavia, Ireland, and South Africa. The United States extended de jure recognition after the first Israeli election, on 31 January 1949.

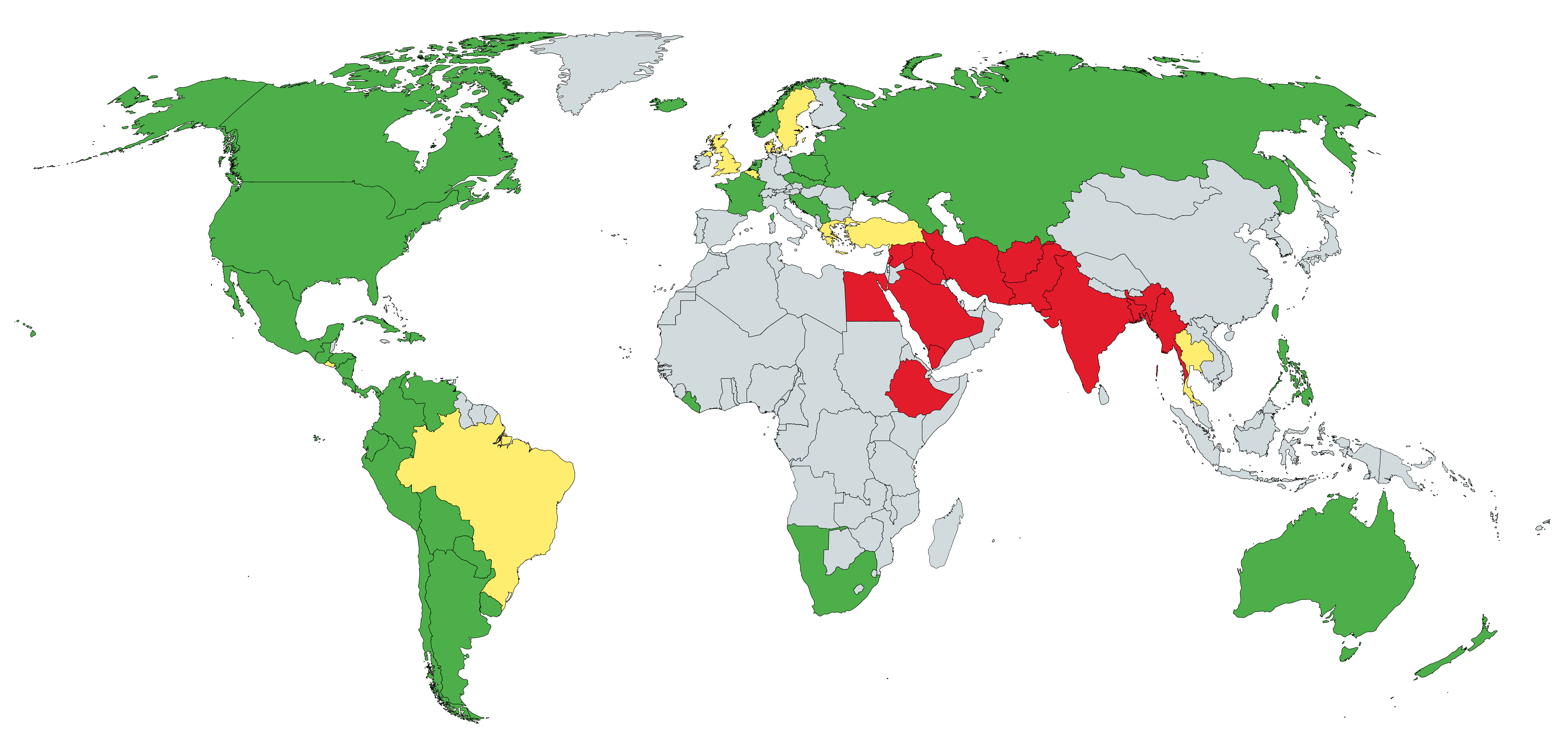
United Nations General Assembly Resolution 273, voting results by country

On 15 May 1948, one day after the declaration of its establishment, Israel applied for membership of the United Nations, but the application was not acted on by the Security Council. Israel's second application was rejected by the Security Council on 17 December 1948 by a 5 to 1 vote, with 5 abstentions. Seven votes in favor were required in order to approve the application. Syria was the sole negative vote; the U.S., Argentina, Colombia, the Soviet Union and Ukraine voted in favor; and Belgium, Britain, Canada, China and France abstained.

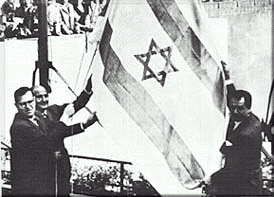
Israeli delegation after it was admitted into the UN in May 1949.

Israel's application was renewed in 1949 after the Israeli elections. The Security Council by UN Security Council Resolution 69 on 4 March 1949 voted 9 to 1 in favour of membership, with Egypt voting no and Great Britain abstaining. Those voting in favour were: China (ROC), France, United States, Soviet Union, Argentina, Canada, Cuba, Norway, and Ukrainian SSR. Great Britain said it had decided to abstain because it believed Israel did not agree with United Nations' principles, citing Israel's refusal to allow Jerusalem to be internationally governed in accordance with the United Nations Partition Plan for Palestine.

Admission to Israel's membership was conditional on Israel's acceptance and implementation of Resolutions 181 (the Partition Plan) and 194 (besides other things, on status of Jerusalem and the return of Palestinian refugees). On 11 May 1949, the General Assembly by the requisite two-thirds majority approved the application to admit Israel to the UN by United Nations General Assembly Resolution 273. The vote in the General Assembly was 37 to 12, with 9 abstentions. Those that voted for were: Argentina, Australia, Bolivia, Byelorussia, Canada, Chile, China, Colombia, Costa Rica, Cuba, Czechoslovakia, Dominican Republic, Ecuador, France, Guatemala, Haiti, Honduras, Iceland, Liberia, Luxembourg, Mexico, Netherlands, New Zealand, Nicaragua, Norway, Panama, Paraguay, Peru, Philippines, Poland, Ukraine, South Africa, Soviet Union, United States, Uruguay, Venezuela, and Yugoslavia. Those that voted against were six of the then seven members of the Arab League (Egypt, Iraq, Lebanon, Saudi Arabia, Syria and Yemen) as well as Afghanistan, Burma, Ethiopia, India, Iran and Pakistan. Those abstaining were: Belgium, Brazil, Denmark, El Salvador, Greece, Siam, Sweden, Turkey and United Kingdom. Many of the countries that voted in favour or had abstained had already recognised Israel before the UN vote, at least on a de facto basis.

=== 1950s ===
David Ben-Gurion, the Israeli prime minister at the time, supported sending Israeli troops to join UN forces in Korea. However, the political party Mapam was opposed to such measures as it favoured relations with North Korea over the South. As a compromise, instead of sending troops, the government sent $100,000 in medical and food supplies to the South Korean government.

After the failure of early attempts at resolution, and until 1967, discussion of Israel and Palestine was not as prominent at the UN. Exceptions included border incidents like the Qibya massacre, the passage of Security Council Resolution 95 supporting Israel's position over Egypt's on usage of the Suez Canal, and most prominently the 1956 Suez Crisis.

Following the closing of the Suez canal by Egypt, Israel, France and Great Britain attacked Egypt starting 29 October 1956. The First emergency special session of the United Nations General Assembly was called on 1 November to address that crisis. On 2 November, the General Assembly adopted the United States' proposal for Resolution 997 (ES-I); it called for an immediate ceasefire, the withdrawal of all forces behind the 1949 armistice lines and the reopening of the Suez Canal. The emergency special session consequently adopted a series of enabling resolutions which established the UNEF, the first UN peacekeeping force. On 7 November, David Ben-Gurion declared victory against Egypt, renounced the 1949 armistice agreement with Egypt and added that Israel would never agree to the stationing of UN forces on its territory or in any area it occupied. Eventually, Israel withdrew from the Sinai but with conditions for sea access to Eilat and a UNEF presence on Egyptian soil. By 24 April 1957, the canal was fully reopened to shipping.

=== 1960s ===
In 1961, the regional groups were created at the UN. From the onset, Arab and Muslim countries blocked the inclusion of Israel in the Asia group (see Regional Groups below).

After months of debate in the Security Council and General Assembly before, during and after the 1967 Six-Day War, United Nations Security Council Resolution 242 was adopted. It became a universally accepted basis for Arab–Israeli and later, Israeli–Palestinian peace negotiations. In it, the Land for peace principle was spelled out. This resolution is one of the most discussed, both within and outside of the UN.

In November 1967, Gunnar Jarring was appointed as the UN special envoy for the Middle East peace process. The Jarring Mission was unsuccessful.

The Six-Day War of 1967 generated a new wave of Palestinian refugees who were not covered by the original UNRWA definition. From 1991, the UN General Assembly has adopted an annual resolution allowing the 1967 refugees within the UNRWA mandate.

In 1968, the Special Committee to Investigate Israeli Practices Affecting the Human Rights of the Palestinian People was created to investigate Israeli settlements in occupied Arab territories, and other matters. It has continued to generate yearly General Assembly resolutions and other documents.

=== 1970s ===
The Israeli–Palestinian conflict gained prominence following the emergence of Palestinian armed groups, especially the Palestine Liberation Organization and the increased political strength of the Arab group as the main suppliers of petroleum to the Western world. At the UN, the Arab group also gained the support of the Soviet Bloc against Israel allied to the US.

In rapid succession, several events brought the Palestinian struggle to the forefront: the 1972 Olympic Munich massacre, the 1973 Yom Kippur War, the ensuing 1973 oil crisis and, in 1975, the beginning of the Lebanese Civil War.

The Geneva Conference of 1973 was an attempt to negotiate a solution to the Arab–Israeli conflict. No comprehensive agreement was reached, and attempts in later years to revive the Conference failed.

In 1973, a General Assembly resolution about Apartheid "Condemns in particular the unholy alliance between Portuguese colonialism, Apartheid and Zionism." This statement was reused in the preamble to resolution 3379.

About the 1974 UNESCO decision to exclude Israel from its membership, Julian Huxley, the first director of UNESCO, wrote to The Times to complain. UNESCO defended this decision with two statements in 1974 and 1975. Israel's membership was renewed two years later.

Starting in 1974, 1967 territories were named "Occupied Arab Territories" in UN documents. In 1982, the phrase "Occupied Palestinian Territories" became the usual name. This phrase was not used at the UN prior to 1967, when the same territories were under military occupation by Jordan and Egypt.

The Committee on the Exercise of the Inalienable Rights of the Palestinian People was created in 1975 and of the United Nations Division for Palestinian Rights in 1977. Also in 1977, the International Day of Solidarity with the Palestinian People was first celebrated on 29 November the anniversary of resolution 181.

The 1975 UN Resolution 3379 stated "that Zionism is a form of racism and racial discrimination". The resolution was preceded by resolutions adopted at the United Nations-sponsored World Conference of the International Women's Year in 1975. Resolution 3379 was sponsored by 25 Arab states; 72 voted for, 35 voted against and 32 abstained.

In his speech to the UN General Assembly after the resolution's passage, US ambassador to the UN Daniel Patrick Moynihan, declared that the US "does not acknowledge, it will not abide by, it will never acquiesce in this infamous act." Israeli ambassador Chaim Herzog told his fellow delegates this resolution was "based on hatred, falsehood and arrogance. Hitler," he declared, "would have felt at home listening to the UN debate on the measure."

The 1979 Egypt–Israel peace treaty was a landmark event. Egyptian president Anwar Sadat is credited for initiating the process, following the failure of the UN-mediated peace negotiations, notably the Geneva Conference. The secret negotiations at Camp David in 1978 between Sadat, Menachem Begin and Jimmy Carter, and the treaty itself essentially bypassed UN-approved channels. The Camp David Accords (but not the Treaty itself) touch on the issue of Palestinian statehood. Egypt, Israel, and Jordan were to agree a way to establish elected self-governing authority in the West Bank and Gaza. Egypt and Israel were to find means to resolve the refugee problem.

The General Assembly was critical of the accords. General Assembly Resolution 34/65 (1979) condemned "partial agreements and separate treaties". It said that the Camp David accords had "no validity insofar as they purport to determine the future of the Palestinian people and of the Palestinian territories occupied by Israel since 1967". In protest, the General Assembly did not renew the peace-keeping force in the Sinai peninsula, the UNEF II, despite requests by the US, Egypt and Israel, as stipulated in the treaty. To honor the treaty despite the UN's refusal, the Multinational Force and Observers was created, which has always operated independently of the UN. Egypt was expelled from the Arab League for a period of ten years.

=== 1980s ===
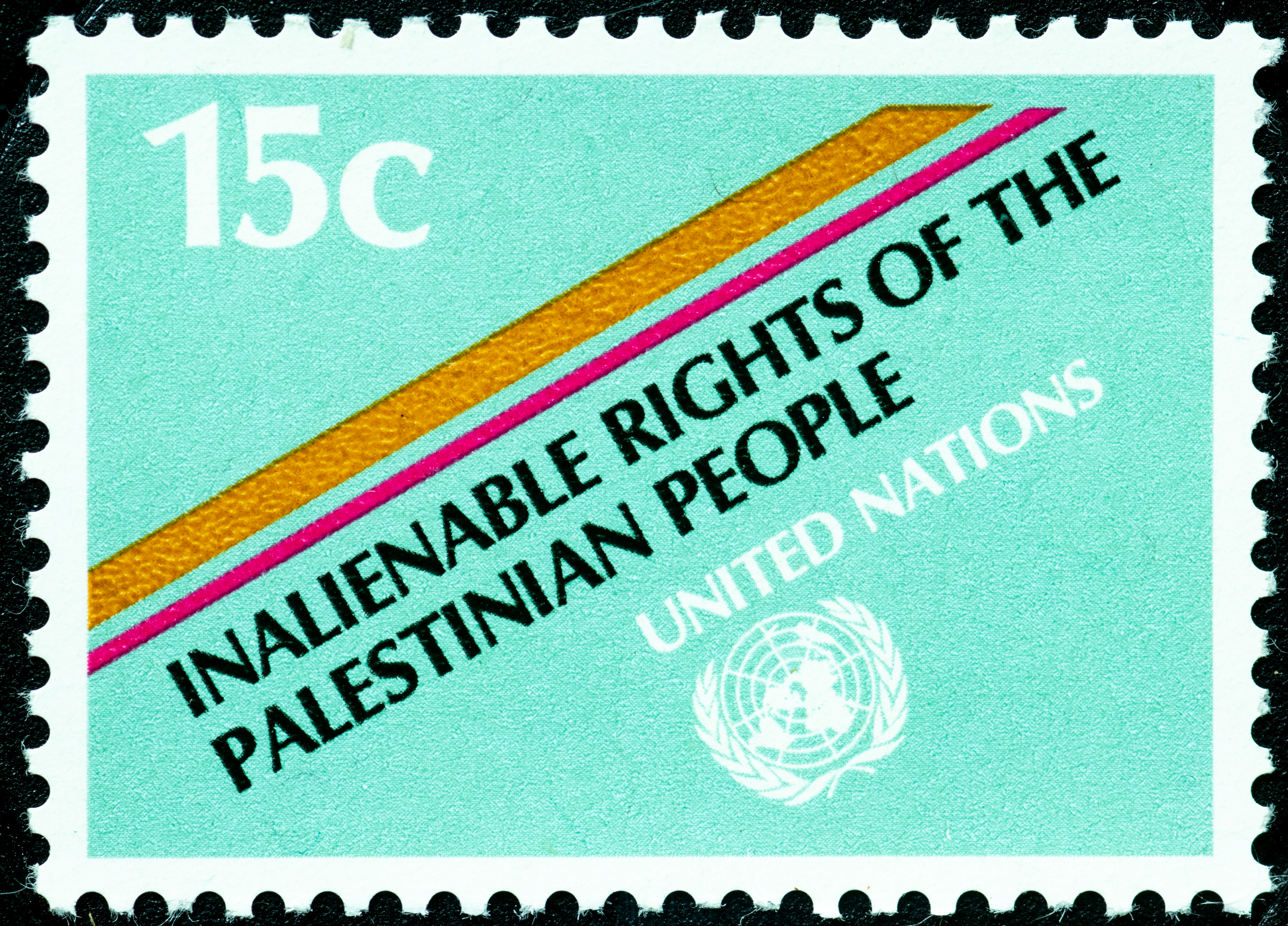
Postage stamp of United Nations honoring the Committee on the Exercise of the Inalienable Rights of the Palestinian People (1981)

Between 1980 and 1988, some states made attempts to expel Israel from the General Assembly. For example, the credentials committee received in 1985 a letter signed by 34 Muslim states and the USSR. These attempts were unsuccessful.

The Palestinian National Council adopted in Algiers in 1988 the declaration of independence of the State of Palestine. The UN has not officially recognised this state but, by renaming the PLO observer as the Palestine observer, can be seen as having done so unofficially. In July 1998, the General Assembly adopted resolution 52/250 conferring upon Palestine additional rights and privileges, including the right to participate in the general debate held at the start of each session of the General Assembly, the right of reply, the right to co-sponsor resolutions and the right to raise points of order on Palestinian and Middle East issues.

=== 1990s ===
Following sixteen years of intense diplomatic pressure by the US, the United Nations General Assembly Resolution 3379, which determined that "Zionism is a form of racism", of 1975 was revoked in 1991 by resolution 46/86 as a precondition for the participation of Israel to the Madrid Conference.

Following the 1993 Oslo peace accords between Israel and the PLO, followed in 1994 by the Israel–Jordan peace treaty, the language of yearly General Assembly resolutions was modified to reduce criticism of Israeli actions. Moreover, between 1993 and 1995 the Security Council never directly condemned Israel. During this period, the Security Council also denounced terrorism against Israel for the first time. The most central resolution adopted during this warming trend toward Israel came on 14 December 1993, when 155 member states endorsed the Israel–Palestinian and the Israel–Jordan agreements and granted "full support for the achievements of the peace process so far". This resolution was the first UN call for Middle East peace that did not criticize Israel. In October 1993, for the first time since 1981, the Arab members of the UN did not challenge Israel's seat at the General Assembly.

=== 2000s ===
The year 2000 saw the failure of the Camp David peace negotiations and the beginning of the Second Intifada.

In 2003, the Israeli West Bank barrier became another subject of criticism. It was declared illegal by both the General Assembly and the International Court of Justice. The Court found that the portions of the wall beyond the Green Line and the associated regime that had been imposed on the Palestinian inhabitants is illegal. The Court cited illegal interference by the government of Israel with the Palestinian's national right to self-determination; and land confiscations, house demolitions, the creation of enclaves, and restrictions on movement and access to water, food, education, health care, work, and an adequate standard of living in violation of Israel's obligations under international law. The UN Fact Finding Mission and several UN Rapporteurs subsequently noted that in the movement and access policy there has been a violation of the right not to be discriminated against on the basis of race or national origin.

A series of terrorist attacks in March 2002 prompted Israel to conduct Operation Defensive Shield. The fiercest episode was the battle of Jenin in the UNRWA administered refugee camp of Jenin, where 75 died (23 IDF soldiers, 38 armed and 14 unarmed Palestinians) and 10% of the camp's buildings destroyed. The UN send a first visiting mission. A separate fact-finding mission was mandated by the Security Council but blocked by Israel, a move condemned in General Assembly resolution 10/10 (May 2002). This mission was replaced by a report which was widely commented in the media. Many observers noted that the UN dropped the accusations of massacre made by Palestinians during and soon after the battle, and reproduced in the annex 1 of the report.

The Road map for peace is, since 2002, the latest and current effort by the UN to negotiate peace in the region. This document was initially proposed by US president George W. Bush and sponsored by a quartet of the US, Russia, the European Union and the UN. The official text is in the form of a letter to the Security Council, not a General Assembly or Security Council resolution. It generated a series of changes: the sidelining of Yasser Arafat and the unilateral withdrawal of Jewish settlers and the Israeli forces from occupied territories, notably the Gaza Strip. Progress is now stalled.

In 2003, Israel sought to gain support for a resolution of its own, the first it had introduced since 1976. The resolution called for the protection of Israeli children from terrorism. The resolution was worded to be very similar to General Assembly resolution 58/155 (22 December 2003) titled " Situation of and assistance to Palestinian children". Israel withdrew the draft after a group of nations belonging to the Non-Aligned Movement, led by Egypt, insisted on including amendments that would have transformed the document into an anti-Israel resolution. The changes demanded were the altering of all references to "Israeli children" to read "Middle Eastern children," and the insertion of harsh condemnation of Israeli "military assaults," "occupation" and "excessive use of force" before any mention of Arab terrorism. The draft was withdrawn and never came to vote.

Security Council Resolution 1544 (2004) reiterated the obligation of Israel, the occupying Power, to abide scrupulously by its legal obligations and responsibilities under the Fourth Geneva Convention, and called on Israel to address its security needs within the boundaries of international law.

In 2005, the UN approached Israel with a request that it contribute IDF troops, especially military medical units, to UN peacekeeping missions such as those in Haiti, Kosovo, Congo, and Liberia. The UN also expressed interest in purchasing Israeli-made military equipment for UN peacekeepers, especially night-vision goggles and telecommunications equipment.

The Israeli representative was elected in 2005 to the symbolic position of vice-president of the 60th UN General Assembly.

On 11 December 2007, the General Assembly adopted a resolution on agricultural technology for development sponsored by Israel. The Arab group proposed a series of amendments referring to the Palestinian occupied territories, but these amendments were rejected. The Tunisian representative said: "The Arab Group was convinced that Israel was neither interested in agriculture nor the peace process." This group demanded a vote on the resolution, an unusual demand for this kind of country-neutral resolution. "The representative of the United States (...) expressed disappointment with the request for a recorded vote because that could send a signal that there was no consensus on the issues at stake, which was not the case. The United States was saddened by the inappropriate injection into the agenda item of irrelevant political considerations, characterized by inflammatory remarks that devalued the importance of the United Nations agenda". The resolution was approved by a recorded vote of 118 in favour to none against, with 29 abstentions. The abstentions were mainly from the Arab Group.

=== 2010s ===
In February 2011, the United States vetoed a draft resolution to condemn all Jewish settlements established in the occupied Palestinian territory since 1967 as illegal. The resolution, which was supported by all other Security Council members and co-sponsored by over 120 nations, would have demanded that "Israel, as the occupying power, immediately and completely ceases all settlement activities in the occupied Palestinian territory, including East Jerusalem and that it fully respect its legal obligations in this regard." The U.S. representative, Susan E. Rice, said that while it agreed that the settlements were illegal, the resolution would harm chances for negotiations. Israel's deputy Foreign Minister, Daniel Ayalon, said that the "UN serves as a rubber stamp for the Arab countries and, as such, the General Assembly has an automatic majority," and that the vote "proved that the United States is the only country capable of advancing the peace process and the only righteous one speaking the truth: that direct talks between Israel and the Palestinians are required." Palestinian negotiators, however, have refused to resume direct talks until Israel ceases all settlement activity.

On 31 January 2012, the United Nations independent "International Fact-Finding Mission on Israeli Settlements in the Occupied Palestinian Territory" filed a report stating that Israeli settlements led to a multitude of violations of Palestinian human rights and that if Israel did not stop all settlement activity immediately and begin withdrawing all settlers from the West Bank, it potentially might face a case at the International Criminal Court. It said that Israel was in violation of article 49 of the fourth Geneva convention forbidding transferring civilians of the occupying nation into occupied territory. It held that the settlements are "leading to a creeping annexation that prevents the establishment of a contiguous and viable Palestinian state and undermines the right of the Palestinian people to self-determination." After Palestine's admission to the United Nations as a non-member state in September 2012, it potentially may have its complaint heard by the International Court. Israel refused to co-operate with UNHRC investigators and its foreign ministry replied to the report saying that "Counterproductive measures – such as the report before us – will only hamper efforts to find a sustainable solution to the Israel–Palestinian conflict. The human rights council has sadly distinguished itself by its systematically one-sided and biased approach towards Israel."

=== 2020s ===
In the aftermath of the 2023 Hamas-led attack on Israel and during the Gaza war, the Israeli government criticized the United Nations. On multiple occasions, Israeli officials called for the resignation of UN secretary-general António Guterres. Israel also moved to limit the issuance of travel visas to UN representatives. Lynn Hastings, the UN Humanitarian Coordinator for the Occupied Palestinian Territory, was forced to leave Israel after her visa was revoked. The United Nations criticized Israel for bombing its facilities and killing 142 UN employees, (Note: By October 2024, the number of UN employees killed in Gaza had grown to 230.) while Israel stated the UN was biased. By 8 January 2024, the UN had recorded 63 direct hits by Israel on its facilities since 7 October. On 15 January, UNRWA reported its facilities had been affected by Israeli fighting on 232 incidents, with 150 UNRWA staff and 330 internally displaced people killed. By late-May 2024, the UN stated that 450 displaced people had been killed in UNRWA shelters since 7 October 2023.

In May 2024, the Israeli ambassador to the UN Gilad Erdan shredded a copy of the United Nations charter and called the United Nations a "terror organisation". In June 2024, a Knesset bill proposed designating UNRWA as a "terrorist organization". The same month, the United Nations added Israel to a list of states committing violations against children. In response, the Israeli government discussed implementing punitive measures against UN agencies operating in the Palestinian Territories. Speaking to Israeli public radio, Erdan stated, "The time has come for Israel to seriously consider the pros and cons of withdrawing from the United Nations." In July 2024, an Israeli air raid destroyed UNRWA's headquarters in Gaza City, which the UNRWA head Philippe Lazzarini stated was a "blatant" war crime. Several days later, the Knesset voted to designate UNRWA a "terrorist organization".

In October 2024, Israel voted to ban communication between the government and UNRWA, effectively making humanitarian aid border crossings into Gaza impossible. Officials in the Israeli Foreign Ministry acknowledged that such a move could jeopardize Israel's membership in the United Nations.

== Issues ==
=== Legality of the State of Israel ===
Resolution 181 laid a foundation within international law and diplomacy for the creation of the state of Israel; as it was the first formal recognition by an international body of the legitimacy of a Jewish state, to exist within a partition of the territory along with an Arab state.

The UN followed the practice of the Paris Peace Conference and the League of Nations regarding the creation of states. Religious and minority rights were placed under the protection of the United Nations and recognition of the new states was conditioned upon acceptance of a constitutional plan of legal protections. Israel acknowledged that obligation, and Israel's declaration of independence stated that the State of Israel would ensure complete equality of social and political rights to all its inhabitants irrespective of religion, race or sex, and guaranteed freedom of religion, conscience, language, education and culture. In the hearings before the Ad Hoc Political Committee that considered Israel's application for membership in the United Nations, Abba Eban said that the rights stipulated in section C. Declaration, chapters 1 and 2 of UN resolution 181(II) had been constitutionally embodied as the fundamental law of the state of Israel as required by the resolution. The instruments that he cited were the Declaration of the Establishment of the State of Israel, and various cables and letters of confirmation addressed to the Secretary General. Eban's explanations and Israel's undertakings were noted in the text of General Assembly Resolution 273 (III) Admission of Israel to membership in the United Nations, May 11, 1949.,

=== Allegations of bias ===
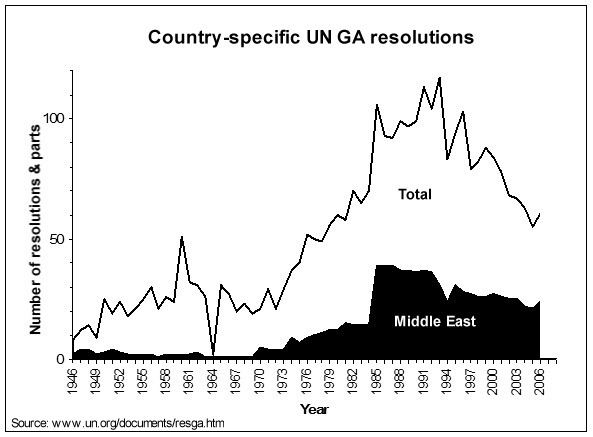
Number of country-specific UN General Assembly resolutions concerned with the Middle East (Palestine, Israel, Lebanon, Syria) vs. total country-specific resolutions. The graph is additive.

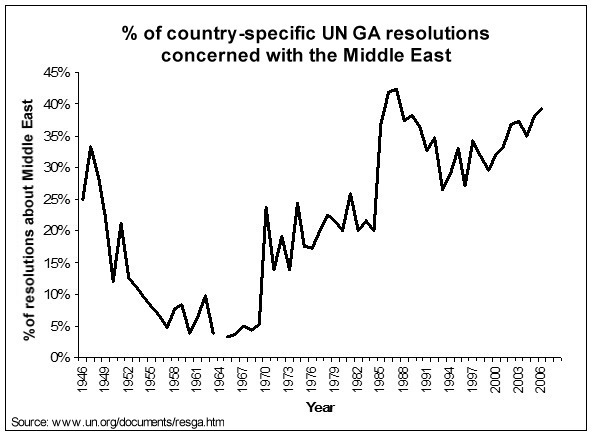
Percentage of country-specific UN General Assembly resolutions concerned with the Middle East (Palestine, Israel, Lebanon, Syria)

In recent years, the Middle East was the subject of 76% of country-specific General Assembly resolutions, 100% of the Human Rights Council resolutions, 100% of the Commission on the Status of Women resolutions, 50% of reports from the World Food Programme, 6% of United Nations Security Council resolutions and 6 of the 10 Emergency sessions.

These decisions often criticize Israel for its "occupation of Palestinian land and its oppression of Palestinians." A number of observers have described this criticism as excessive. For example, according to the UN Association of the UK, General Assembly resolutions in the period 1990–2003 show bias against Israel, condemnation of violence against Palestinians, but only occasional discussion of violence against Israelis.

The United States has been criticized as well by the OIC and other Arab organisations, for vetoing most Security Council decisions critical of Israel, the so-called Negroponte doctrine. Since 1961, Israel has been barred from the Asian regional group. In 2000, it was offered limited membership in the Western European and Others Group. On 29 November 2012, the UN General Assembly adopted United Nations General Assembly resolution 67/19 changing Palestine's "entity" status to "non-member state" by a vote of 138 to 9, with 41 abstentions. Some sources claim that these measures implicitly recognised its sovereignty.

In 2002, the PLO issued a report comparing the international response to the Israeli–Palestinian conflict to similar situations in Bosnia, Kosovo, Kuwait, Rwanda, East Timor, and Iraq. It contended that the international community, and the Security Council in particular, displayed pro-Israel bias because, in these other cases, "the international community has both condemned violations of international law and has taken action to ensure that the violations cease. In the case of the Palestinian–Israeli conflict, however, while the same condemnations have been issued against Israel, absolutely no enforcement action has been taken."

A 2005 report by the United States Institute of Peace on UN reform said that, contrary to the UN Charter's principle of equality of rights for all nations, Israel is denied rights enjoyed by all other member-states, and that a level of systematic hostility against it is routinely expressed, organized, and funded within the United Nations system.

In a lecture at the 2003 UN conference on antisemitism, Anne Bayefsky said:

There has never been a single resolution about the decades-long repression of the civil and political rights of 1.3 billion people in China, or the more than a million female migrant workers in Saudi Arabia being kept as virtual slaves, or the virulent racism which has brought 600,000 people to the brink of starvation in Zimbabwe. Every year, UN bodies are required to produce at least 25 reports on alleged human rights violations by Israel, but not one on an Iranian criminal justice system which mandates punishments like crucifixion, stoning, and cross-amputation. This is not legitimate critique of states with equal or worse human rights records. It is demonization of the Jewish state.

Legal scholar Robert A. Caplen wrote that institutional bias against Israel within the UN has deprived the country of its ability to exercise lawfully those rights accorded to member states under the UN Charter.

In October 2010, Canada lost to Portugal in a vote for a seat at the Security Council. Several observers attributed this loss to the pro-Israel policy of Canada at the UN, including Canadian PM Stephen Harper.

On 16 August 2013, UN Secretary-General Ban Ki-moon stated in a meeting with Israeli students that there was a biased attitude towards the Israeli people and Israeli government at the UN. He described this as "an unfortunate situation." A few days later, Ban Ki-Moon retracted those comments, stating: "I don't think there is discrimination against Israel at the United Nations".

In an interview on 16 December 2016, UN Secretary General, Ban Ki-moon, said that the UN has issued a "disproportionate volume of resolutions, reports and conferences criticizing Israel."

In July 2024, the UN Human Right Council's Special Rapporteur on the Occupied Palestinian Territories Francesca Albanese expressed support on X (formerly Twitter) for a post that compared Israeli prime minister Benjamin Netanyahu to Adolf Hitler. The post, uploaded by former UN human rights official Craig Mokhiber, featured an image of Hitler saluting in a crowd above a photo of Netanyahu addressing the US Congress. In response, US ambassador to the UN Linda Thomas-Greenfield stated, "It is clear [Albanese] is not fit for this or any position at the UN." Responding to the criticism, Albanese said, "The Memory of the #Holocaust remains intact and sacred thank[s] to people of conscience worldwide. Institutional rants and outburst[s] of selective moral outrage will not stop the course of #Justice, which is finally in motion." while Mokhiber said "The world knows the truth. No one falls for this silly Israel lobby trick anymore. Israel is on trial for genocide in the ICJ. Netanyahu is charged by the ICC prosecutor with crimes against humanity, including extermination. 'Never again' is for everybody. If that offends you, you are on the wrong side of history."

Following an Iranian missile attack on Israel on 1 October 2024, in which the country launched 180 ballistic missiles against Israel, UN Secretary-General Antonio Guterres issued a general statement condemning the "broadening of the Middle East conflict", without mentioning Iran. In response, Israel's foreign minister, Israel Katz, announced that Guterres would be barred from entering the country due to his failure to condemn the Iranian attack. Katz wrote that "Anyone who cannot unequivocally condemn Iran's heinous attack on Israel, as almost every country in the world has done, does not deserve to step foot on Israeli soil"; as of 1 October, according to American Jewish Committee, 11 countries have condemned the Iranian attack.

In January 2026, the Israeli government intensified its policy of disengagement from United Nations bodies, citing systemic bias and institutional inefficiency. Following a review of international organizations, partially prompted by a simultaneous withdrawal of the United States from 66 global bodies, Foreign Minister Gideon Sa'ar announced that Israel would immediately sever all contact with UN Energy, the UN Alliance of Civilizations (UNAOC), and the Global Forum on Migration and Development. The Foreign Ministry justified the move by characterizing the UNAOC as a "platform for attacks against Israel" that systematically excluded Israeli participation in dialogue forums. UN Energy was described as a "wasteful organization" indicative of broader UN "excessive and inefficient bureaucracy".

These actions formalized a trend of previous disengagements in 2024, when Israel ceased cooperation with the Office of the Special Representative for Children and Armed Conflict following the "blacklisting" of the IDF, and with UN Women over its perceived failure to address sexual violence during the October 7 attacks.

In May 2026, the Israeli government published a report alleging systematic anti-Israel bias and breaches of neutrality by several United Nations agencies and officials involved in reporting on the Gaza war, citing such conduct as evidence of broader institutional problems within parts of the UN system.

=== General Assembly ===
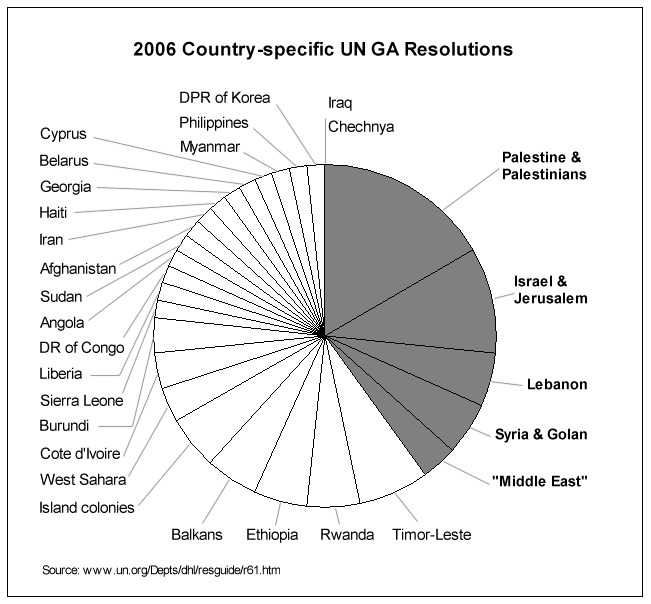
Breakdown of the 61 country-specific UN General Assembly resolutions adopted by the 61st General Assembly session (2006–2007)

A few countries have consistently supported Israel's actions in the UN, such as the United States of America and the states of Micronesia, the Marshall Islands and Palau all of which are associated states of the U.S. Recently Australia, under the leadership of John Howard, and Canada, under the leadership of Stephen Harper, have also supported Israel at the UN. Many European countries usually adopt a neutral stance, abstaining from the ongoing condemnations of Israel and supporting the foundation of a Palestinian state. Such countries include France, Russia, and Germany.

A study published by the UN Association of the UK, reviewing the language of General Assembly resolutions about Israel between 1990 and 2003, found that:

resolutions adopted in the same period by the General Assembly were far more explicit in their condemnation of Israel. (...) Violence perpetrated against Israeli civilians, including the use of suicide bombers, is mentioned only a few times and then in only vague terms. Violence against Palestinian civilians, on the other hand, is described far more explicitly. Israeli occupying forces are condemned for the "breaking of bones" of Palestinians, the tear-gassing of girls' schools and the firing on hospitals in which a specific number of women were said to be giving birth. Another trend noted in General Assembly Resolutions is a progressively more anodyne tone towards Israel throughout the period examined. This is reflected in a decreasing tendency of resolutions to specify Israeli culpability in policies and practices reviewed by the General Assembly; compare, for example, General Assembly resolution 47/70 (1992) with 58/21 (2003).

As noted above, this trend towards a more anodyne tone regarding Israel at the General Assembly followed the signature of the Oslo Accords in 1993. This UN–UK report concludes that "criticism is not necessarily a product of bias, and it is not the intention here to suggest that UNGA and UNSC reproaches of Israel stem from prejudice. From the perspective of the UN, Israel has repeatedly flouted fundamental UN tenets and ignored important decisions."

The 61st session of the General Assembly (2006–2007) adopted 61 country-specific resolutions (see graph above). The Israeli delegation alleged:

21 of those resolutions focused on and unfairly criticized Israel. The resolutions are usually initiated by members of the Arab Group, and are adopted by a wide margin ("Automatic Majority") in the General Assembly

US envoy Susan Rice said in August 2009 "The assembly continues to single out Israel for criticism and let political theater distract from real deliberation."

Caroline Glick writes that "Due to the UN's unvarnished belligerence toward it, in recent years a consensus has formed in Israel that there is nothing to be gained from cooperating with this openly and dangerously hostile body".

Former Israeli ambassador Dore Gold wrote that "The Palestinians understand that the automatic support they receive at the UN enables them to implement restrictions on Israel's right of self-defense. For this reason, the Palestinians have never abandoned the use of one-sided resolutions at the UN General Assembly, even during the most optimistic times of the peace process."

In an opinion piece in the Jerusalem Post, Efraim Chalamish said that, in 2010, "Israel and the United Nations have significantly improved their relationships over the past few months.(...) Nowadays, the government is promoting its legitimate membership status by enhanced participation in more balanced UN forums, such as the Economic and Social Council, while still presenting a hawkish approach towards hostile and one-sided forums, including the Human Rights Council in Geneva."

=== Regional Groups ===
The United Nations Regional Groups were created in 1961. From the onset, the majority of Arab countries within the Asia group blocked the entry of Israel in that group. Thus, for 39 years, Israel was one of the few countries without membership to a regional group and could not participate in most UN activities. On the other hand, Palestine was admitted as a full member of the Asia group on 2 April 1986. (Note: For the purposes of United Nations Regional Groups arrangement, the Palestine Liberation Organization participates in the Asia group since 2 April 1986.)

In 2000, Israel was admitted to the Western European and Others Group (WEOG) but Israel's membership is limited to activities at the UN's New York City headquarters. Elsewhere, Israel is an observer, not a full member, in WEOG discussions and consultations. Therefore, Israel cannot participate in UN talks on human rights, racism and a number of other issues. The Human Rights Council meets in Geneva, UNESCO in Paris.

In December 2007, Israel was voted by WEOG to represent the grouping in consultations for two UN agencies: HABITAT, the UN Human Settlement Program, and UNEP, the UN Environment Program. Both these agencies are based in Nairobi.

=== Shebaa farms ===
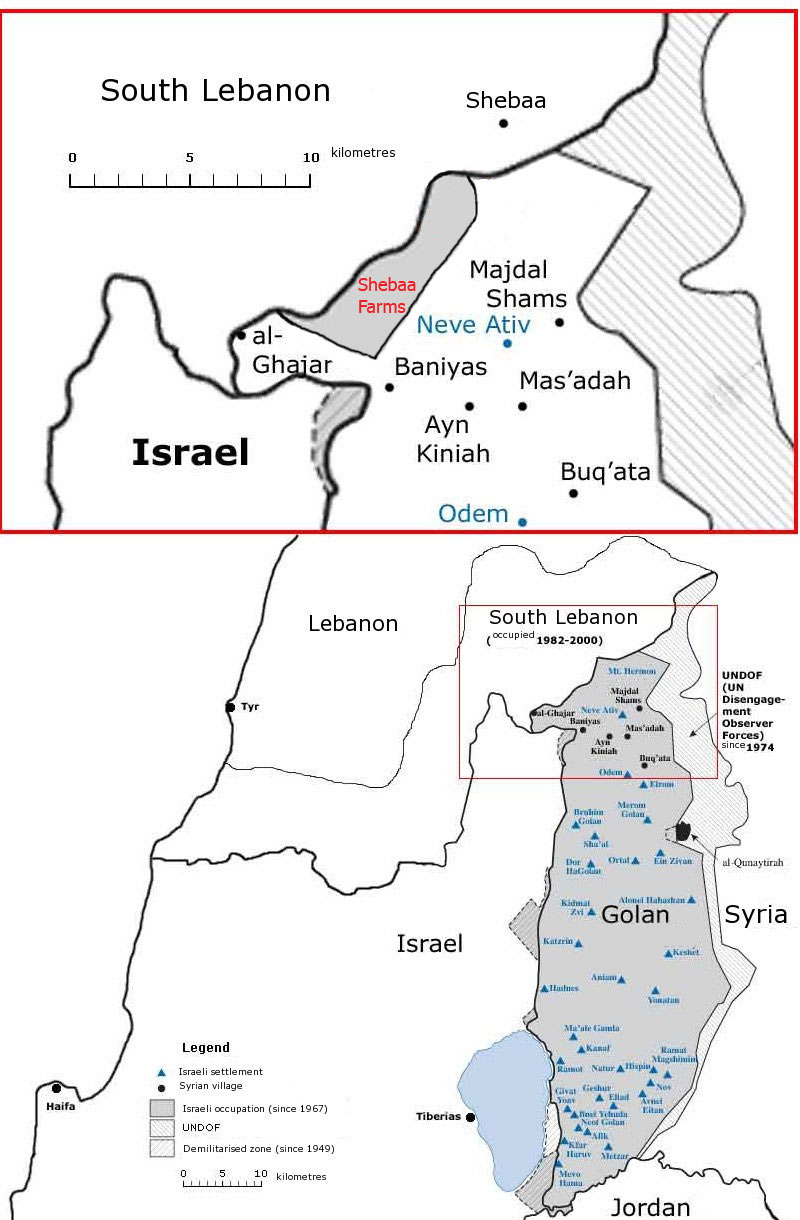
Map showing the location of the Shebaa farms

The status of seven small villages collectively known as the Shebaa farms, located at the Lebanon-Syria border, is controversial. Some evidences support a Syrian territory, others a Lebanese territory.

The United Nations considers this territory as Syrian which has, since the 1967 Six-Day War, been occupied by Israel. Following the 1978 Israel-Lebanon war, the Security Council accepted the report of UN-mandated cartographers stating that "as of 16 June 2000 Israel has withdrawn its forces from Lebanon in accordance with resolution 425 (1978)" In accordance with this decision, the current map from UNIFIL shows this territory as Syrian.

Hezbollah is an armed Lebanese group originally formed to repel the 1982 Israeli occupation of South Lebanon. Since 2000, it continues to fight occupation of Lebanon by Israel, using the Shebaa farms as justification. Following the 2006 Israel-Lebanon war, the UN accepted at the request of the Lebanese government to re-evaluate the ownership of this territory. This promise was included in the text of Security Council resolution 1701. In August 2008, the Lebanese govt adopted Hezbollah's claim to the "right of Lebanon's people, the army and the resistance to liberate all its territories in the Shebaa Farms, Kfarshuba Hill and Ghajar".

A Lebanon Independent Border Assessment Team (LIBAT) was mandated by the UN but has not yet reported on this issue.

=== United States policy at the UN ===
The U.S. has vetoed over forty condemnatory Security Council resolutions against Israel; almost all U.S. vetoes cast since 1988 blocked resolutions against Israel, on the basis of their lack of condemnation of Palestinian terrorist groups, actions, and incitement. This policy, known as the Negroponte doctrine, has drawn both praise and criticism.

=== UN Human Rights Council ===
According to UN Watch, an NGO, the UN Human Rights Council (UNHRC) had, as at August 2015, issued more condemnations of Israel than of all other member states combined.

At its Second Special Session in August 2006, the UNHRC voted to establish a Commission of Inquiry to investigate allegations that Israel systematically targeted Lebanese civilians during the 2006 Israel–Lebanon conflict. The Commission noted that its report on the conflict would be incomplete without fully investigating both sides, but that "the Commission is not entitled, even if it had wished, to construe [its charter] as equally authorizing the investigation of the actions by Hezbollah in Israel".

The Special Rapporteur on the question of Palestine to the previous UNCHR, the current UNHRC and the General Assembly was, between 2001 and 2008, John Dugard. The mandate of the Rapporteur is to investigate human rights violations by Israel only, not by Palestinians. Dugard was replaced in 2008 with Richard Falk, who has compared Israel's treatment of Palestinians with the Nazis' treatment of Jews during the Holocaust. Like his predecessor, Falk's mandate only covers Israel's human rights record. Commenting on the end of Falk's mandate in May 2014, US delegate Samantha Power cited Falk's "relentless anti-Israeli bias" and "his noxious and outrageous perpetuation of 9/11 conspiracy theories."

Miguel d'Escoto Brockmann, a former UNGA president, was elected to the UNHRC Advisory Committee in June 2010.

Many observers have made allegations of anti-Israel bias. The Economist wrote: "In its fourth regular session, which ended in Geneva on March 30, [2007,] the 47-member council again failed to address many egregious human-rights abuses around the world. (...) Indeed, in its nine months of life, the council has criticised only one country for human-rights violations, passing in its latest session its ninth resolution against Israel." In 2007 Human Rights Watch noted the UNHRC disproportionate focus on Israel and accused it of failing to take action on other countries facing human rights crises. Similar accusations were voiced by Freedom House, the Washington Post, Kofi Annan, Ban Ki-moon, US president George W. Bush, and members of the European Parliament. The UNHRC President himself, Doru Costea, said in 2007 that the council should "not place just one state under the magnifying glass".

In a report on UNHCR activities between June 2007 and June 2009, Freedom House found some improvement but noted that "Israel remained the target of an inordinate number of both condemnatory resolutions and special sessions."

Esther Brimmer of the United States State Department said on 15 September 2010 "we must remedy the [UNHR]Council's ongoing biased and disproportionate focus on Israel." US Congress member Ileana Ros-Lehtinen called for defunding of the HRC over its excessive criticism of Israel. The Daily News|location=New York denounces the apparent bias at UNHCR in two editorials. Current United Nations High Commissioner for Human Rights, Navi Pillay, denied the accusations of anti-Israel bias at the UNHCR. Addressing UNHCR in February 2011, Hillary Clinton denounced its "structural bias against Israel". In March 2012, the UNHRC was further criticised by the United States over its anti-Israel bias. It took particular exception to the council's Agenda Item 7, under which at every session, Israel's human rights record is debated. No other country has a dedicated agenda item. The US Ambassador to the UNHRC, Eileen Chamberlain Donahoe, said that the United States was deeply troubled by the "Council's biased and disproportionate focus on Israel." She said that the hypocrisy was further exposed in the UN Golan Heights resolution that was advocated "by the Syrian regime at a time when it is murdering its own citizens". On 24 March 2014, US delegate to the UNHRC, Samantha Power, qualified the anti-Israel bias of this committee as "beyond absurd".

In March 2012, UNHCR was criticised for facilitating an event featuring a Hamas politician. The Hamas parliamentarian had spoken at an NGO event in the UN Geneva building. Israeli Prime Minister Binyamin Netanyahu castigated the UNHRC's decision stating: "He represents an organization that indiscriminately targets children and grown-ups, and women and men. Innocents – is their special favorite target." Israel's ambassador to the UN, Ron Prosor, denounced the speech, stating that Hamas was an internationally recognized terrorist organization that targeted civilians. "Inviting a Hamas terrorist to lecture to the world about human rights is like asking Charles Manson to run the murder investigation unit at the NYPD", he said.

==== Fact Finding mission on the 2008 Gaza War (Goldstone report) ====
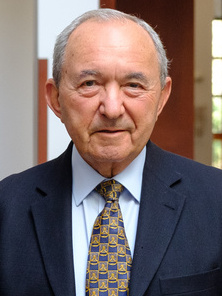
Richard J. Goldstone, a South African, is a former Constitutional Court Judge and lawyer. He led UN Fact-Finding Mission on the 2008–2009 Gaza War.

A fact finding mission on human rights violations during the 2008 Gaza War between Israel and Hamas administration in Gaza was called by 12 January 2009, UNHRC, which limited the investigation to "violations (...) by the occupying Power, Israel, against the Palestinian people throughout the Occupied Palestinian Territory, particularly in the occupied Gaza Strip" but, before any investigation, it already "Strongly condemns the ongoing Israeli military operation carried out in the Occupied Palestinian Territory, particularly in the occupied Gaza Strip, which has resulted in massive violations of the human rights of the Palestinian people".

Former UN High Commissioner for Human Rights and Ireland President Mary Robinson refused to head the mission because she "felt strongly that the Council's resolution was one-sided and did not permit a balanced approach to determining the situation on the ground."

On 3 April 2009, Richard Goldstone was named head of the mission. In a 16 July interview, he said "at first I was not prepared to accept the invitation to head the mission". "It was essential," he continued, to expand the mandate to include "the sustained rocket attack on civilians in southern Israel, as well as other facts." He set this expansion of the mandate as a condition for chairing the mission. The next day, he wrote in The New York Times "I accepted because the mandate of the mission was to look at all parties: Israel; Hamas, which controls Gaza; and other armed Palestinian groups." The UNHRC press release announcing his nomination documents the changed focus of the mission. Writing in The Spectator, commentator Melanie Phillips said that the resolution that created the mandate allowed no such change and questioned the validity and political motivations of the new mandate.

Israel thought that the change of the mandate did not have much practical effect.

Israel refused to cooperate with the Goldstone Mission and denied its entry to Israel, while Hamas and Palestinian National Authority supported and assisted the Mission.

In January, months before the mission, Professor Christine Chinkin, one of the four mission members, signed a letter to the London Sunday Times, asserting that Israel's actions "amount to aggression, not self-defense" and that "the manner and scale of its operations in Gaza amount to an act of aggression and is contrary to international law". She authored the final report.

Israel concluded that "it seemed clear beyond any doubt that the initiative was motivated by a political agenda and not concern for human rights" and therefore refused to cooperate with it – in contrast to its policy to cooperate fully with most of the international inquiries into events in the Gaza Operation.

The mission report was published on 15 September 2009. As noted in the press release, the mission concluded "that serious violations of international human rights and humanitarian law were committed by Israel in the context of its military operations in Gaza from 27 December 2008, to 18 January 2009, and that Israel committed actions amounting to war crimes, and possibly crimes against humanity. The Mission also found that Palestinian armed groups had committed war crimes, as well as possibly crimes against humanity."

Goldstone, however, explained that what he had headed was not an investigation, but a fact-finding mission. "If this was a court of law, there would have been nothing proven", Goldstone said, emphasizing that his conclusion that war crimes had been committed was always intended as conditional. Nevertheless, the report itself is replete with bold and declarative legal conclusions seemingly at odds with the cautious and conditional explanations of its author.

Reactions to the report's findings were varied. The report was not immediately ratified by a UNHRC resolution. This step was postponed to March 2010. This delay is attributed to diplomatic pressure from Western members of the council, including the US which joined in April 2009 and, surprisingly, from the Palestinian Authority representative. About the U.S. pressure, UNHRC representative Harold Hongju Koh described the U.S. participation to the council as "an experiment" with the Goldstone report being the first test.

The report was finally ratified by 14 October UNHRC resolution A/HRC/S-12/L.1. Like the 12 January resolution but unlike the report, this ratification condemns Israel, not Hamas. The "unbalanced focus" of the ratification was criticized by U.S. State Department spokesman Ian Kelly, U.S. ambassador to the UNHRC Douglas Griffiths and Richard Goldstone himself.

On 1 April 2011, Goldstone retracted his claim that it was Israeli government policy to deliberately target citizens, saying "If I had known then what I know now, the Goldstone Report would have been a different document". On 14 April 2011 the three other co-authors of the United Nations Fact Finding Mission on the Gaza Conflict of 2008–2009, Hina Jilani, Christine Chinkin and Desmond Travers, released a joint statement criticizing Goldstone's recantation of this aspect of the report. They all agreed that the report was valid and that Israel and Hamas had failed to investigate alleged war crimes satisfactorily.

==== Commission of inquiry on the 2014 Gaza conflict ====
On 23 July 2014, during the 2014 Israel–Gaza conflict, the UNHRC adopted resolution S-21 for a commission of inquiry to "investigate all violations of international humanitarian law and international human rights law in the Occupied Palestinian Territory, including East Jerusalem, particularly in the occupied Gaza Strip, in the context of the military operations conducted since 13 June 2014". The apparent anti-Israel bias in the mandate of the commission was denounced by Gregory J. Wallance in The Guardian and by the US, Canadian and Australian delegates to the UNHRC during the debate of the resolution.

=== UNESCO ===
UNESCO also adopts yearly resolutions for the preservation of the old Jerusalem, a UNESCO World Heritage Site included in the List of World Heritage in Danger.

In 2007, an emergency session of UNESCO was held to discuss Israeli archaeological excavations at the Mughrabi ascent in the Old City of Jerusalem. The session report said that the excavations were "a naked challenge by the Israeli occupation authorities" to the UN position on the status of Jerusalem. Following a fact-finding mission, Israel was exonerated of blame by the executive board. UNESCO never criticized repeated episodes of mechanized excavations within the Temple Mount ground by the Muslim Waqf, and is financing a museum within the al-Aqsa Mosque compound (the Temple Mount). The museum closed for non-Muslims in 2000 and this situation has not changed until the time of this note, June 2014.

==== 2001 Durban conference against racism ====
During the World Conference against Racism held in Durban in 2001, the accusation that "Zionism is a form of racism" resurfaced.

In an editorial about the 2001 Durban's World Conference against Racism, Ronald Eissens of "I CARE" (Internet Centre Anti Racism Europe) wrote "All through the NGO Forum, there have been Antisemitic incidents. The Arab Lawyers Union had a stall in the NGO exhibition tents displaying gross Antisemitic cartoons. Copies of the infamous Protocols of the Elders of Zion were being sold. When the ISC was asked to do something against the Antisemitic cartoons they decided that the cartoons were not racist but 'political'".

A similar scene was described by Anne Bayefsky The Qatar delegate said, according to official UN records:

the Israeli enmity towards the Palestinians, and its destruction of their properties and economy do not stem from its desire to subjugate them to the arrogance of power only, but also from its strong sense of superiority which relegates the Palestinians to an inferior position to them. Ironically enough, the Israeli security is sacred when balanced against the Palestinian security and all the Israeli heinous violations are justified as a means to bring back every Jew to a land that they raped from its legitimate owners and denied them their right to claim it back.

In a 2002 interview with the BBC, Mary Robinson said that some good came out of the conference, "but I also admit that it was an extremely difficult conference. That there was horrible anti-Semitism present – particularly in some of the NGO discussions. A number people came to me and said they've never been so hurt or so harassed or been so blatantly faced with an anti-Semitism."

Navanethem Pillay, the current United Nations High Commissioner for Human Rights, published in 2008 a similar opinion of the event

==== 2009 Durban Review conference ====
The April 2009 Durban Review Conference held in Geneva, was boycotted by nine western countries. During an official speech at this conference, Iran president Mahmoud Ahmadinejad said:

some powerful countries (...) under the pretext of protecting the Jews they made a nation homeless with military expeditions and invasion. They transferred various groups of people from America, Europe and other countries to this land. They established a completely racist government in the occupied Palestinian territories. And in fact, under the pretext of making up for damages [sic] resulting from racism in Europe, they established the most aggressive, racist country in another territory, i.e. Palestine. The Security Council endorsed this usurper regime and for 60 years constantly defended it and let it commit any kind of crime.(...) The global Zionism is the complete symbol of racism, which with unreal reliance on religion has tried to misuse the religious beliefs of some unaware people and hide its ugly face.

During his speech, all European representatives walked out. The outcome document makes no reference to Israel or Palestinians.

=== Resolution 3379 ===
The 1975 Resolution 3379, which determined that "Zionism is a form of racism and racial discrimination" was revoked by Resolution 4686 in 1991. Twenty-five states voted against this revocation, twenty-one of which have predominantly Muslim inhabitants. During the first-ever conference on antisemitism at the UN, in 2004, Kofi Annan said that the UN record on antisemitism had sometimes fallen short of the institution's ideals, and that he was glad that the "especially unfortunate" 1975 General Assembly resolution equating Zionism with racism had been rescinded.

The "Zionism is a form of racism" concept reappeared in 2001 World Conference against Racism in Durban. Zouheir Hamdan (Lebanon) claimed that "One (Israeli) minister described the Palestinians as serpents, and said they reproduced like ants. Another minister proposed that Palestinians in Israel be marked with yellow cards". A draft resolution denounced the emergence of "movements based on racism and discriminatory ideas, in particular the Zionist movement, which is based on racial superiority.". The draft was removed following the departure of the US and Canadian delegates. General Assembly President Father Miguel D'Escoto Brockmann repeated the accusation in a speech during the 2008 International Day of Solidarity with the Palestinian People.

On 24 January 2008, UN High Commissioner for Human Rights Louise Arbour welcomed the entry into force of the Arab Charter on Human Rights which states: "Article 2(3) All forms of racism, Zionism and foreign occupation and domination constitute an impediment to human dignity and a major barrier to the exercise of the fundamental rights of peoples; all such practices must be condemned and efforts must be deployed for their elimination."

Arbour subsequently distanced herself from some aspects of the charter. The charter is listed in the web site of her office, among texts adopted by international groups aimed at promoting and consolidating democracy

=== Direct involvement of UN personnel in conflict ===
There have been occasional reports of UN personnel becoming caught up in hostilities.

Indian peacekeepers of the UNIFIL peace mission in Southern Lebanon were accused of complicity in the 2000 Hezbollah cross-border raid, in which three Israel Engineering Corps soldiers were killed and their bodies captured after Hezbollah fighters infiltrated into Israel. According to the Israeli newspaper Ma'ariv, Hezbollah bribed several Indian troops with hundreds of thousands of dollars in return for participating in the kidnapping and secretly negotiated with them to make sure that they would participate. Israeli investigators who were sent to India to question the suspected soldiers were told that Hezbollah had paid them large sums of money for their cooperation.

On 22 November 2002, during a gun battle between the IDF and Islamic Jihad militants, Iain Hook, UNRWA project manager of the Jenin camp rehabilitation project, was killed by Israeli gunfire. A soldier had reportedly mistaken him for a militant and a cellphone in his hand for a gun or grenade.

On 11 May 2004, Israel said that a UN ambulance had been used by Palestinian militants for their getaway following a military engagement in Southern Gaza,

In 2004, Israel complained about comments made by Peter Hansen, head of UNRWA. Hansen had said that there were Hamas members on the UNRWA payroll, and that he did not see that as a crime, they were not necessarily militants, and had to follow UN rules on staying neutral.

On 26 July 2006, Israeli aircraft and artillery attacked a well-marked, long-standing UNIFIL position, killing four UNIFIL peacekeepers. UN Secretary General Kofi Annan called the bombing "deliberate", while Israel claimed that Hezbollah had fighters that fired from the vicinity of that position, and had sheltered near it to avoid an Israeli counterstrike.

In 2008, the Israeli Defense Ministry accused UNIFIL of intentionally concealing information to the Security Council about Hezbollah military activity south of the Litani river, in violation of its mandate.

In January 2009, during the Gaza War, a number of people were killed by Israeli bombing outside a school run by the UNRWA; the number and identity of victims is disputed (see Al-Fakhura school incident for details.) Initially, the UN accused Israel of directly bombing the school. Maxwell Gaylord, the UN humanitarian co-ordinator for the Palestinian territories, described the incidents as tragic. Israel claims that a Hamas squad was firing mortar shells from the immediate vicinity of the school. Hamas denies this claim. In February 2009, Gaylord said that the UN "would like to clarify that the shelling and all of the fatalities took place outside and not inside the school". The headquarters of the UNRWA in Gaza was also shelled on 15 January. Tons of food and fuel were destroyed. Israel claims that militants ran for safety inside the UN compound after firing on Israeli forces from outside. UNRWA spokesman Chris Gunness dismissed the Israeli claims as "baseless".

In March 2012, UN official Khulood Badawi, an Information and Media Coordinator for the United Nations Office for the Coordination of Humanitarian Affairs, tweeted a picture of a Palestinian child covered in blood captioned the picture with "Another child killed by #Israel... Another father carrying his child to a grave in #Gaza." It was later stated that the picture was published in 2006 and was of a Palestinian girl who had died in an accident unrelated to Israel. Israel's Ambassador to the United Nations Ron Prosor called for her dismissal, stating that she was "directly engaged in spreading misinformation". He accused her conduct as deviating from "the organization's responsibility to remain impartial" and said that such actions "contribute to incitement, conflict and, ultimately, violence."

She later tweeted that she mistakenly had tweeted an old photo. Ma'an News Agency reported a week later that the hospital medical report on the dead girl read that she died "due to falling from a high area during the Israeli strike on Gaza". There are differing accounts of how the Israeli air strike, reported to be as little as 100 meters away, may have caused the accident.

=== Cooperation with UN missions ===
In December 2008, Israel detained Richard Falk, the Special Rapporteur on the situation of human rights in the occupied Palestinian territory, and denied him transit to West Bank on his official mission.

On 30 August 2022, outgoing UN High Commissioner for Human Rights Michelle Bachelet said "In 2020, the 15 international staff of my Office in Palestine – which has been operating in the country for 26 years – had no choice but to leave. Subsequent requests for visas and visa renewals have gone unanswered for two years. During this time, I have tried to find a solution to this situation, but Israel continues to refuse to engage." She went on to say "Israel's treatment of our staff is part of a wider and worrying trend to block human rights access to the occupied Palestinian territory. This raises the question of what exactly the Israeli authorities are trying to hide." The Israeli mission to the UN in Geneva accused her office of being a "mouthpiece for Palestinian Authority."

== See also ==
- List of the UN resolutions concerning Israel
- Permanent Representative of Israel to the United Nations
- UN Watch
