= 1982 Extraordinary NAM Ministerial Meeting on Palestine, Kuwait =

1982 Extraordinary NAM Ministerial Meeting on Palestine

1982 Extraordinary NAM Ministerial Meeting on Palestine
- Host country: Kuwait
- Date: 5–8 April 1982
- Cities: Kuwait City
- Chair: Jaber Al-Ahmad Al-Sabah (Emir of Kuwait)

The 1982 Extraordinary Ministerial Meeting of the Non-Aligned Movement on the topic of Palestine took place from 5 to 8 April in Kuwait City, the capital of Kuwait. It was the first of three meetings on Palestine that the Non-Aligned Movement organized in that year. The meeting in Kuwait was called by the Coordinating Bureau of the Movement during the NAM United Nations Headquarters meeting in New York, which took place between 25 and 28 September 1981. The meeting provided the first opportunity for Egypt, one of the founding members of the Movement, to attend a conference in an Arab country that severed diplomatic relations with it after the 1978 Camp David Accord.

== Participants ==
Participants of the meeting were categorized and listed in different groups which included:

- Members of the Coordinating Bureau; Bangladesh, Benin, Bhutan, Burundi, People's Republic of the Congo, Cuba, Cyprus, Democratic People's Republic of Korea, South Yemen, Ethiopia, Ghana, Guyana, India, Indonesia, Iraq, Jamaica, Jordan, Laos, Lesotho, Madagascar, Mauritania, Mozambique, Nigeria, Palestine Liberation Organization, Panama, Peru, Somalia, Sri Lanka, Syria, Togo, Cameroon, SFR Yugoslavia, Zaire and Zambia.
- Other members of the movement; Afghanistan, Algeria, Angola, Bahrain, Comoros, Ecuador, Egypt, Grenada, Guinea, Iran, Kenya, Kuwait, Lebanon, Libyan Arab Jamahiriya, Malaysia, Maldives, Mali, Malta, Morocco, Nicaragua, Niger, Oman, Pakistan, Qatar, Sao Tome and Principe, Saudi Arabia, Senegal, South West African People's Organization, Sudan, Suriname, Tunisia, United Arab Emirates, Tanzania, Upper Volta, Vietnam and Yemen Arab Republic.
- Observer countries, organizations and national liberation movements; Philippines, African National Congress, Organization of the Islamic Conference, Organization of African Unity, United Nations and League of Arab States.
- Guest countries and organizations; Austria, Finland, Romania, Sweden, Committee on the Exercise of the Inalienable Rights of the Palestinian People, Special Committee against Apartheid, United Nations Council for Namibia and International Committee of the Red Cross.

== See also ==
- Foreign relations of Kuwait
- International recognition of the State of Palestine
