= United Nations Information System on the Question of Palestine =

Text archive

The United Nations Information System on the Question of Palestine (UNISPAL) is an online collection of texts of current and historical United Nations decisions and publications concerning the question of Palestine, the Israeli–Palestinian conflict and other issues related to the Middle East situation.

UNISPAL-Select contains a selection of the most important U.N. documents on these issues. The Special Focus section features documents on recent developments. The Supplement features non-U.N. documents on these issues.

== See also ==
- Arab–Israeli conflict
- Israel and the United Nations
- Palestine and the United Nations
