= United Nations Division for Palestinian Rights =

Body of the UN Department of Political Affairs

- Abbreviation: UNDPR
- Legal status: Active
- Headquarters: New York, United States
- Parent organization: Department of Political Affairs

The United Nations Division for Palestinian Rights (UNDPR) is a part of the Department of Political Affairs of the United Nations Secretariat.

== History ==
The UNDPR, originally named Special Unit on Palestinian Rights in the United Nations Secretariat, was created by the Resolution 32/40(B) of December 2, 1977:

"Following the affirmation of the inalienable national rights of the Palestinian people and the establishment in 1975 of the Committee on the Exercise of the Inalienable Rights of the Palestinian People, the General Assembly recognized the need for creating an informed public opinion around the world in support of the achievement of those rights" in order "... to assist the Committee in its work and to prepare studies and publications on the issue and to promote maximum publicity for them."

The Division's mandate has been renewed annually and has been expanded several times over the years, in particular to include the organization of international meetings, the establishment of a computer-based information system called the United Nations Information System on the Question of Palestine (UNISPAL) and the holding of an annual training program for staff of the Palestinian Authority.

== Activities ==
The core functions of the Division include:

- Providing support and services for the Committee on the Exercise of the Inalienable Rights of the Palestinian People
- Assisting the Committee in the exercise of its mandate and the promotion and implementation of its recommendations
- Planning, organizing and servicing the Committee's program of international meetings
- Maintaining liaison with active NGOs
- Organizing the annual commemoration of the International Day of Solidarity with the Palestinian People
- Preparing studies and publications "relating to the question of Palestine and the inalienable rights of the Palestinian people and promoting their widest possible dissemination, including in cooperation with the Department of Public Information"
- Maintaining and developing the Web-based United Nations Information System on the Question of Palestine (UNISPAL).

=== Publications ===
The Division prepares the following publications on a regular basis:

- A monthly bulletin on international action on the question of Palestine, containing resolutions, decisions and communiqués of the relevant United Nations and other intergovernmental bodies and agencies
- A periodic bulletin entitled Developments related to the Middle East Peace Process
- A monthly chronological summary of events based on press reports and other publicly available sources
- A special bulletin on the observance of the International Day of Solidarity with the Palestinian People
- An annual compilation of resolutions and decisions of the General Assembly and the Security Council relating to the question of Palestine

=== Training programs ===
The Division has conducted an annual training program for staff of the Palestinian Authority since 1996. The program is carried out at United Nations Headquarters in New York in cooperation with the Permanent Observer Mission of Palestine to the United Nations in conjunction with the convening of the General Assembly.

=== International Day of Solidarity with the Palestinian People ===
The International Day of Solidarity with the Palestinian People is observed annually to commemorate the adoption on November 29, 1947, of United Nations General Assembly Resolution 181 (II), which provided for the partition of Palestine into two States. The observance takes place at UN Headquarters in New York and at the UN Offices at Geneva and Vienna and elsewhere. The event includes meetings, Palestinian exhibits, film showings and other activities organized by governmental bodies and NGOs, in cooperation with the United Nations Information Centers.

== See also ==
- Arab–Israeli conflict
- List of the UN resolutions concerning Palestine
- Israel and the United Nations
- Reform of the United Nations
