= International Day of Solidarity with the Palestinian People =

UN-organized observance

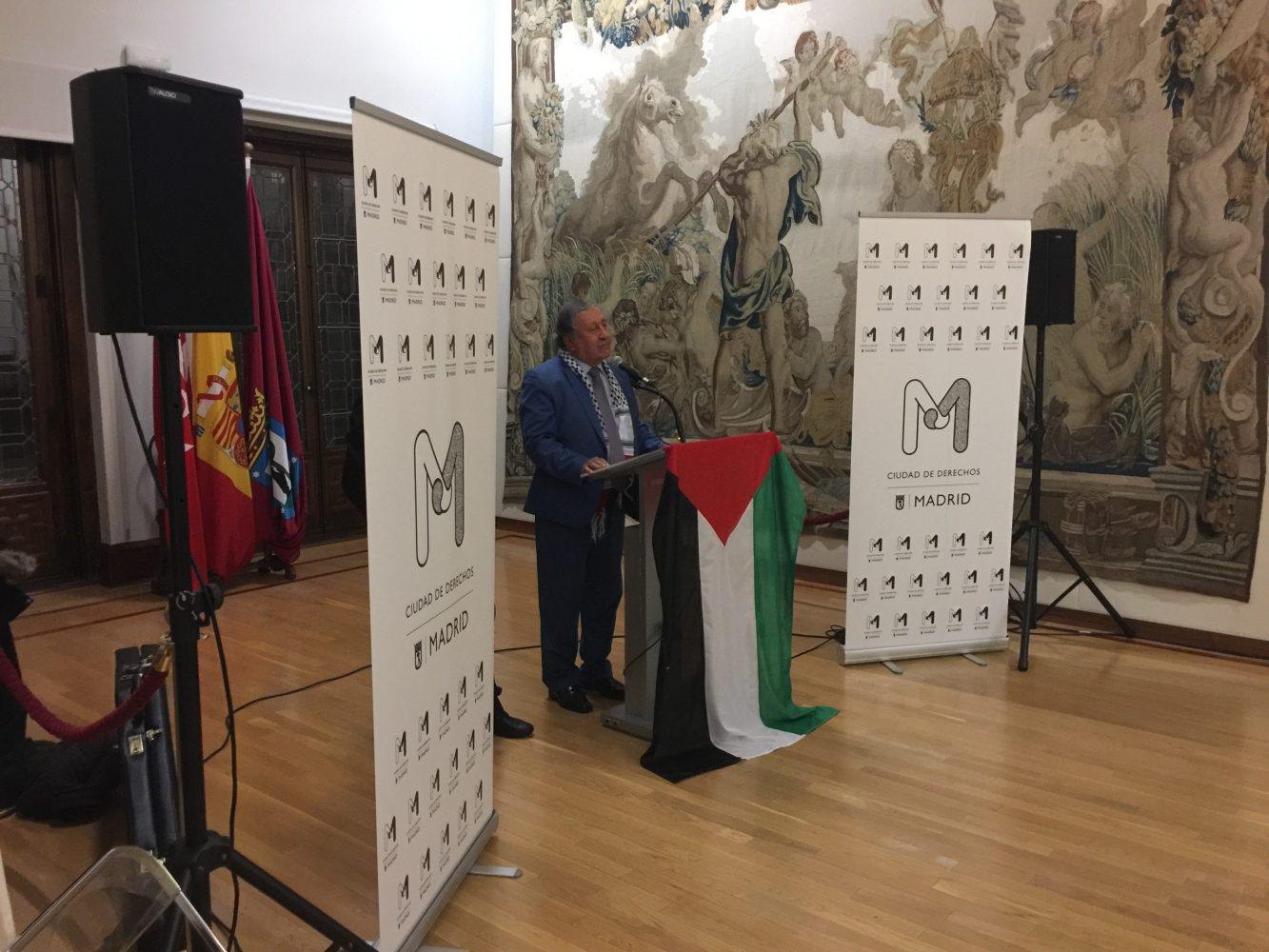
Celebration of the International Day of Solidarity with the Palestinian People in Madrid in 2017. In the photograph, Musa Amer Odeh, Palestinian ambassador to Spain.

The International Day of Solidarity with the Palestinian People (Arabic: اليوم الدولي للتضامن مع الشعب الفلسطيني) is a UN-organized observance. Events are held at the United Nations headquarters in New York, as well as at the United Nations offices at Geneva, Vienna and Nairobi. It is generally held on November 29 each year to mark the anniversary of Resolution 181 which advocated for the partition of Palestine into two States: one Arab and one Jewish. In 2003, it was observed on December 1.

On this day every year, the United Nations urges immediate action in an effort to grant Palestinians sovereignty and independence from the Israeli Occupation. As the international community commemorates this day, it continues to call on Israel to provide Palestinians with their human rights according to the UN General Assembly. The General Assembly emphasizes its support of the Palestinians' right to return to their homes, which they have been displaced from in 1948 following the creation of the State of Israel, where more than 760,000 Palestinians became refugees.

The annual observance was established in UN General Assembly Resolution 32/40 B of 2 December 1977, to start in 1978. The same resolution proposed the creation of the study The Origins and Evolution of the Palestine Problem.

In Resolution 34/65 D of 12 December 1979, the issue of commemorative postage stamps was requested.

Special commemorative activities are organized by the Division for Palestinian Rights of the United Nations Secretariat, in consultation with the Committee on the Exercise of the Inalienable Rights of the Palestinian People.

In 2001, several members and speakers at the United Nations event for the International Day of Solidarity with the Palestinians urged the creation of an "International Force in the Occupied Territories to protect the Palestinian people." Several countries including Malta, Turkey, and Bangladesh showed their solidarity with Palestinians to gain sovereignty.

In 2005, the UN event included a map that showed all of Israel replaced by Palestine and was attended by Secretary-General Kofi Annan and other senior UN officials.

In 2018, professor and activist Marc Lamont Hill spoke at the United Nations, expressing his full support for the Palestinian cause and a boycott of Israel. His speech received backlash from the Anti-Defamation League and other groups, and he was subsequently fired from his position as a political commentator for CNN. Hill disavowed any antisemitic interpretation of his speech.

Marking the day in 2021, Secretary-General of the United Nations António Guterres tweeted, "The situation in the Occupied Palestinian Territory remains a challenge to int'l peace & security."

In the wake of the Gaza war, Bahraini Member of Parliament Mohammed Musa al-Balooshi delivered a speech criticising the presence of the American, British, and French ambassadors at the 2023 Palestinian Solidarity commemoration, likening their attendance to "killing a victim and then mourning at their funeral" due to these countries' support of Israel. He then left the event in protest.

== See also ==
- International Day of Quds
- Land Day
- Palestine and the United Nations
- Palestine
- Palestinian people
- Israeli–Palestinian conflict
- Arab–Israeli conflict
- Right to return
- United Nations Partition Plan for Palestine
