= Negroponte doctrine =

American doctrine in the Israeli–Palestinian conflict

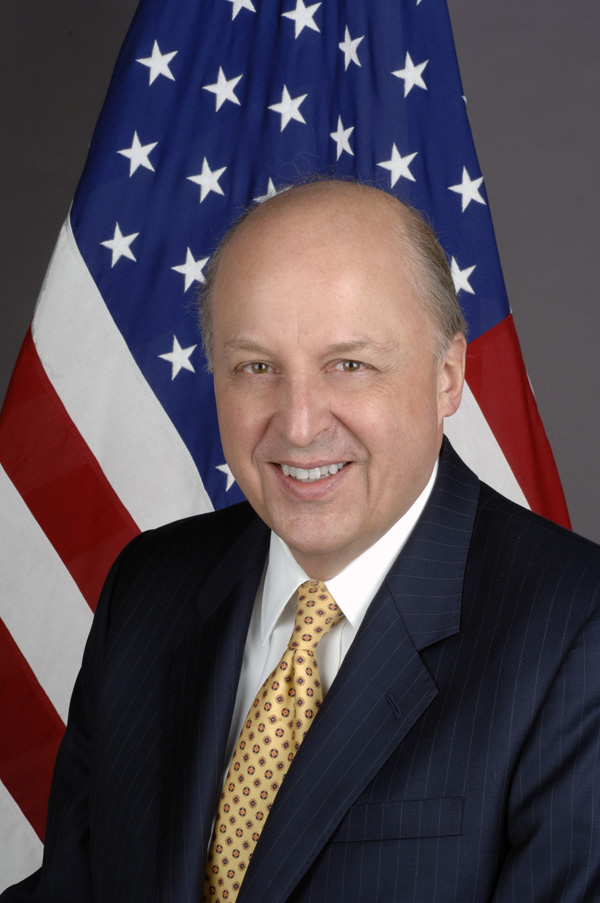
John Negroponte

On July 26, 2002, John Negroponte, the United States Ambassador to the United Nations, stated during a closed meeting of the UN Security Council that the United States will oppose Security Council resolutions concerning the Israeli–Palestinian conflict that condemn Israel without also condemning Palestinian militant groups. This became known as the Negroponte doctrine.

Widely reported summaries of Negroponte's statement (an official transcript of these closed-session remarks does not appear to have been released) have stated that for any resolution to go forward, the United States, which has a veto in the 15-nation council, would expect it to have the following four elements:

- A strong and explicit condemnation of all "terrorism" and "incitement to terrorism";
- A condemnation by name of the al-Aqsa Martyrs' Brigade, Islamic Jihad and Hamas, groups that have claimed responsibility for suicide attacks on Israel;
- An appeal to all parties for a political settlement of the crisis;
- A demand for improvement of the security situation as a condition for any call for a withdrawal of Israeli armed forces to positions they held before the September 2000 start of the Second Intifada.

The doctrine has been viewed by officials in the United States as a counterweight to resolutions denouncing Israel passed by the UN General Assembly. James Zogby of the Arab American Institute said that because of US vetoes of UN Security Council resolutions concerning Israel, "there will never be an effective sanction of Israeli behavior or restraint imposed on Israel."

== See also ==
- Israel–United States relations
- Israel and the United Nations
- United States and the United Nations
- United States support for Israel in the Gaza war
- United States foreign policy in the Middle East
