= Special Committee to Investigate Israeli Practices Affecting the Human Rights of the Palestinian People =

UN program established in 1968

The Special Committee to Investigate Israeli Practices Affecting the Human Rights of the Palestinian People and Other Arabs of the Occupied Territories (UNSCIIP), also called Special Committee on Israeli Practices, was established by United Nations General Assembly Resolution 2443 (XXIII) of 19 December 1968. UNSCIIP was to monitor "respect for and implementation of human rights in occupied territories." The committee comprises representatives of three member states appointed by the president of the General Assembly.

== UNSCIIP's task ==
The Special Committee was created to investigate Israeli settlements in the occupied territories. It prepares yearly General Assembly draft resolutions and other documents. It reports to the General Assembly through the Fourth Committee on matters related to Israeli settlements, the applicability of the Fourth Geneva Convention and the Palestinian Right of Return. The latest report was published on 20 September 2024. The mandate of the Special Committee is renewed annually, for example Resolution 2727 of 15 December 1970 and Resolution 2851 of 20 December 1971.

== UNSCIIP's achievements ==
The committee has fulfilled three vital functions:

1. It has defined the Palestinian matter as a political problem that demands a political solution,
2. It offered an opportunity for UN members to voice their opposition to imperialism and show solidarity with the Third World.
3. It has given a platform for the expression of Palestinian optimism in international law, thereby supporting the UN as a global-utopian initiative.

As of June 2019 and as of June 2024, the committee was composed of Malaysia (which does not recognize Israel), Senegal and Sri Lanka.

== Israel's reaction ==
Israel has repeatedly refused to allow the Special Committee access to Israel, the Occupied Palestinian Territory and the occupied Syrian Golan and has refused to participate in its inquiries.

== Latest reports ==
Date	Symbol	Summary
20/09/2024	A/79/363	In this latest report, the Special Committee expresses grave concerns regarding human rights abuses in the Occupied Palestinian Territories and the Syrian Golan. It asserts that "the policies and practices of Israel during the reporting period are consistent with characteristics of genocide." The Committee observes that Israel's continued actions in Gaza, along with the occupation-cum-annexation of Palestinian and Syrian territories, as well as for its apartheid system, defy United Nations resolutions and International Court of Justice orders, thus eroding the international rules-based system. Additionally, it calls for the accountability of Israeli officials and urges businesses to avoid activities that support or benefit Israel's presence in these regions.
25/10/2023	A/78/553	The report documents the growing influence of Israeli settlers and the worsening human rights situation in the occupied territories, marked by a sharp increase in violence. The Special Committee notes that "by early August 2023, Israeli Forces had already killed more Palestinians in the occupied West Bank and Israel in 2023 than in any other year since 2005." It highlights that settlers, who constitute only 7% of Israel’s population, now hold disproportionate political power, with two of the six members of the Israeli Security Cabinet—Finance Minister Bezalel Smotrich, a Kedumim settlement leader, and Minister of National Security Itamar Ben-Gvir, a settler and former member of the "Hilltop Youth"—being key representatives. These developments have led to the retroactive legalization of settlement outposts and the approval of thousands of new settlement units, actions in direct violation of international law and United Nations resolutions. The report condemns these measures, including the repeal of the 2005 Disengagement Law, and calls for a halt to settlement expansion, citing its contribution to escalating violence and worsening humanitarian crises.
03/10/2022	A/77/501	The report addresses several key concerns, including the humanitarian crisis and blockade of the Gaza Strip, the alarming increase in Palestinian fatalities, and the steady increase in violence by settlers with the acquiescence, support, and participation of Israeli security forces. The committee highlights the criminalization and detention of human rights defenders, as well as the targeting of journalists including the assassination of Palestinian-American journalist Shireen Abu Akleh, and the continued Israeli annexation of Palestinian land, including Masafer Yatta, which constitutes the largest displacement of Palestinians since 1967 and may amount to forcible transfer, a grave breach of international humanitarian law. Furthermore, it highlights the frequent use of lethal force by Israeli security forces as a first resort, citing disproportionate actions that notably resulted in the deaths of young Palestinians. Between January 1 and August 11, 2022, Israeli security forces reportedly killed 74 Palestinians, including 20 children, during purported law enforcement operations in the West Bank, including East Jerusalem.

== End of mission ==
According to the Office of the United Nations High Commissioner for Human Rights, the Special Committee conducted its annual mission to Amman, Jordan, from 4 to 7 July 2022.

== Notes ==
- Silverburg, Sanford R. (2002). Palestine and International Law: Essays on Politics and Economics. McFarland & Company. ISBN 0-7864-1191-0
