= Committee on the Exercise of the Inalienable Rights of the Palestinian People =

United Nations General Assembly-mandated committee

United Nations Committee on the Exercise of the Inalienable Rights of the Palestinian People
- Abbreviation: CEIRPP
- Legal status: Active
- Headquarters: New York, United States
- Head: Chairperson; Cheikh Niang
- Parent organization: United Nations General Assembly
- Website: www.un.org/unispal/committee/

The Committee on the Exercise of the Inalienable Rights of the Palestinian People (CEIRPP) is a committee mandated by the United Nations General Assembly in order to promote the rights of the Palestinian people, support the peace process and to mobilize assistance to the Palestinian people.

The committee meets several times throughout the year in both formal and informal meetings across the globe, including its annual opening session in New York. It also meets every year on 29 November, International Day of Solidarity with the Palestinian People, using the day to encourage member states to support the peace process and Palestinian rights.

== History ==
The committee was founded on 10 November 1975 by Resolution 3376 (XXX) of the General Assembly, which was concerned about the lack of progress in the Israeli–Palestinian peace process. The committee's mandate is to consider and recommend to the General Assembly a program of implementation in order to allow Palestinians to exercise their right to self-determination, national independence and sovereignty as well as their right of return as laid out in General Assembly Resolution 3236 (XXIX). additionally, over the years, the committee's mandate has been expanded to include greater advocacy for the rights of the Palestinian people and the mobilization of assistance.

In 1977 the Special Unit on Palestinian Rights was created by the General Assembly. This unit was created in order to prepare, under the guidance of the committee, studies and publications relating to the rights of the Palestinian people, resolutions relating to Palestinian rights of the various U.N. bodies and the actions the U.N. was taking to promote the attainment of Palestinian rights. In 1979, the unit was redesignated the Division for Palestinian Rights by the General Assembly. This new division would continue to discharge the duties of the special unit, as well as a variety of new functions aiming to establish closer cooperation of the question of Palestine within the U.N. system. The division currently acts as the secretariat of the committee and provides various services including, organizing meetings of the committee and its bureau, organizing a program of international meeting and conferences, maintaining the U.N. Information System on the Question of Palestine and organizing the annual observance of the International Day of Solidarity with the Palestinian People, to name a few.

In recent years the General Assembly has requested the committee monitor all aspects of the situation relating to the question of Palestine and to make recommendations to the General Assembly, the Security Council and the secretary-general. The committee also continues to advocate the realization of the inalienable rights of the Palestinian people, promote a just and peaceful settlement of the Israeli–Palestinian conflict and mobilize assistance for Palestinians. It strongly supports the objective of two states, Israel and Palestine, living side by side within secure and recognized borders, having put their support behind the 1991 Madrid Conference, the 1993 Declaration of Principles and the Quartet's Road Map for Peace. It also continues to support Security Council Resolution 1397 of 12 March 2002, which called for a two-state solution. The committee also convenes international meetings and conferences in various regions of the world, bringing together representatives of governments, intergovernmental and civil society organizations, United Nations system entities, academics, the media and others.

In conjunction with the Division for Palestinian Rights, the committee organizes commemorative activities for the International Day of Solidarity with the Palestinian People, which is held on 29 November each year. The day commemorates the adoption of General Assembly Resolution 181(II) in 1947, which advocated for the partition of Palestine into two states: one Arab and one Jewish.

== Membership ==
=== Member states ===
The committee's members states are:

- Afghanistan
- Belarus
- Bolivia (Plurinational State of)
- Cuba
- Cyprus
- Ecuador
- Guinea
- Guyana
- India
- Indonesia
- Lao People's Democratic Republic
- Madagascar
- Malaysia
- Mali
- Malta
- Namibia
- Nicaragua
- Nigeria
- Pakistan
- Senegal
- Sierra Leone
- South Africa
- Tunisia
- Turkey
- Venezuela, Bolivarian Republic of

=== Observers ===
The observers at the committee meetings are:

- Algeria
- Bangladesh
- Bulgaria
- China
- Egypt
- Iraq
- Jordan
- Kuwait
- Lebanon
- Libya
- Mauritania
- Morocco
- Niger
- Qatar
- Saudi Arabia
- Sri Lanka
- State of Palestine
- Syrian Arab Republic
- United Arab Emirates
- Viet Nam
- Yemen

Meetings of the committee are also attended by the following international organizations:

- African Union
- League of Arab States
- Organization of Islamic Cooperation

== Bureau ==
The committee has an eight-member Bureau that conducts meetings and is in charge of the overall direction of the committee. The Bureau is also in charge of the day-to-day tasks of the committee. On 4 February 2020, the committee elected the following individuals to the Bureau for the year:

Name	Country	Position
Cheikh Niang	Senegal	Chair
Adela Raz	Afghanistan	Vice-chair
Ana Silvia Rodríguez Abascal	Cuba	Vice-chair
Dian Triansyah Djani	Indonesia	Vice-chair
Neville Melvin Gertze	Namibia	Vice-chair
Jaime Castillo Hermida	Nicaragua	Vice-chair
Adela Raz	Afghanistan	Acting Rapporteur
Riyad H. Mansour	State of Palestine	Observer

== See also ==
- Palestine and the United Nations
- Israeli–Palestinian conflict
- Palestinian people
- Palestinian refugee
- Palestinian right of return
