= General Refugee Congress =

The General Refugee Congress (also known as the Palestine General Refugee Congress, the Ramallah Refugee Congress, the Arab Refugee Congress, or the Arab Refugee Congress of Ramallah; GRC) was established in 1949 for the purpose of advocacy for the rights of refugees following the 1948 Palestinian expulsion and flight in Palestine. It served as a platform for the voices of refugee leaders at a time when Palestinians as a whole were without officially-recognized Palestinian state bodies. The GRC worked toward "upholding the right of the refugees to return to their homes," centering their efforts on "the implementation of UN resolution 194." Among its primary activities was representational work to the UN Palestine Conciliation Commission.

== History ==
The organization began in February 1949 as a committee of property-owning refugees in Ramallah, primarily focused at first on organizing humanitarian relief for refugees of the 1948 Palestinian expulsion and flight. In the lead-up to the 1949 Lausanne conference, the group's activities intensified in a more political direction. A larger General Refugee Congress was held on March 17, attended by 500 delegates. (A different source suggests that the total in attandance was 800.) At the March assembly, Muhammad Nimr al-Hawari was elected president. Yahya Hamudah and Aziz Shihadeh were key members of the Congress' executive committee.

The GRC sought to represent the interests of Palestinian refugees. However, parallel—and sometimes competing—political groups also existed at this time. Other refugee organizations, some of which the GRC collaborated with, included: the Jaffa District and Inhabitants Committee, the Representatives of the Land Lords of Palestine, the Palestine Refugees' Conference (Beirut), the Inhabitants of the Western Galilee, the General Palestinian Refugee Congress in Lebanon, and the Palestine Refugees in Lebanon. The GRC collaborated with the first two in this list in particular, as they also attended the Lausanne proceedings.

The GRC "called for the incorporation of refugee representatives from all other Arab Countries" (e.g. Jordan). However, it exempted refugees in Gaza from its remit. It included within its platform acceptance of UNGA resolution 181 (commonly known as the 1947 Partition Plan) and resolution 194 regarding the rights of refugees.

In spring 1949, GRC leadership met with officials of the UN Palestine Conciliation Commission.

The Congress had a complicated political relationship with the Jordanian state. It was perceived as a threat and challenge to the Jordanian government's interests at the Lausanne Conference. In the words of scholar Marte Heian-Engdal:

"Jordan, for its part, wanted to retain for itself the right to negotiate on behalf of the refugees, and consequently felt it had much to lose if the GRC, or any other distinctly Palestinian group outside its sphere of influence, made a claim to the role. The Hashemite kingdom’s dislike of the GRC was manifested by its refusal to allow the GRC to hold meetings in Jordan and its confiscation of the group’s funds."

The Congress became heavily involved in international legal efforts to secure the property rights of Palestinian refugees concerning properties which had fallen under Israeli control. These included both orange groves and bank accounts.

By September 1949, the organization underwent an official name change, then becoming the "Arab Refugee Congress."

== Legacy ==
According to the writer Avi Plascov, the Congress was ultimately weakened by several factors. These included Hawari's "desertion," knowledge spreading among the public of the group's contacts within Israel, and a growing perception of its prioritization of property protection over other refugee issues. According to Plascov, "the Congress's main activity consisted of sending petitions and speaking on behalf of a particular group of property-owners."

Marte Heian-Engdal argues that the Congress can be understood as having taken "a more pragmatic line" than other Arab delegations, promoting "several initiatives that were to be taken as stepping stones to a full resolution of the problem."

== See also ==
- United Nations Conciliation Commission for Palestine
- All-Palestine Government
- Nakba
