= Yahya Hammuda =

Member of the PLO Executive Committee

Yahya Hammuda يحيى حمودة

2nd Chairman of the Palestine Liberation Organization
- In office 24 December 1967 – 2 February 1969
- Preceded by: Ahmad Shukeiri
- Succeeded by: Yasser Arafat

Personal details
- Born: March 1909 Lifta, Ottoman Empire
- Died: 16 June 2006 (aged 97) Amman, Jordan
- Party: Independent
- Profession: Lawyer, politician

Yahya Hammuda (Arabic: يحيى حمودة, also transliterated Hamoudeh or Hammouda; March 1909 – 16 June 2006) was the Chairman of the Palestine Liberation Organization (PLO) Executive Committee from 24 December 1967 to 2 February 1969, following the resignation of Ahmad Shukeiri. He was a veteran activist in Palestinian refugee affairs and a colorless left-leaning lawyer. His tenure as Chairman did not leave a mark on the organization.

== Biography ==
Hammuda was born in the village of Lifta in 1909.

=== General Refugee Congress ===
Following the Nakba, Hammuda took part in an attempt to secure a role for an independent Palestinian refugee delegation to the Rhodes armistice talks together with Muhammad Nimr al-Hawari and 'Aziz Shehadah. He was a founding member of the General Refugee Congress (GRC). The first GRC gathering occurred on 17 March 1949 in Ramallah, where Muhammad Nimr al-Hawari was elected as President and Hammuda as deputy. They persevered with an attempt at securing formal recognition for the body, but they were marginalized by Jordan, where the GRC was based. The Palestine Conciliation Commission (PCC) hoping to gain a degree of independent Palestinian representation, invited GRC delegates to come and appear before them. Ultimately the body was politically "ill-fated."

=== Role in the PLO and post-1967 politics ===
Hammuda was elected as acting chairman of the Palestine Liberation Organization in late 1967. He had previously been a member of the PLO's Executive Committee.

On January 21, 1968, Hammuda was received in Jordan by King Hussein and prime minister Bahjat al-Talhuni in a public welcome to reinvigorate the PLO within Jordan.

He was succeeded as chairman by Yasser Arafat.

== Views ==
In the aftermath of the 1967 war, while acting as PLO chairman, Hammuda publicly stated his belief that Jewish citizens of Israel could not be expelled to the countries from which they had emigrated. This "moderation" came under criticism from Palestinian factions who were troubled by Hammuda's apparent "willingness to come to terms with the existence of Israel." The statement was ultimately retracted.

Historian Yezid Sayigh suggests that Hammuda was a "sympathizer" to the leftist Palestinian faction called the Popular Organization for the Liberation of Palestine (POLP, est. 1964 by Samir al-Khatib and 'Abd al-'Aziz al-Wajih). POLP had "a modest following" and "Maoist leanings" and sought "to bring all guerilla forces under PLA command within a single body."

Preceded by Ahmad Shukeiri	Chairman of the Palestine Liberation Organization; 1967–1969	Succeeded by Yasser Arafat
