= Thawabit =

Set of Palestinian principles on the Israel-Palestine conflict

The Thawabit (Arabic: الثَوَابِت, romanized: ath-thawābit, lit. 'the constants' or 'fundamental principles'; IPA: [aθ.θa.waː.bit]), more formally ath-Thawabit al-Waṭanīya al-Filasṭīnīya (الثوابت الوطنية الفلسطينية, 'the Palestinian national constants'; [aθ.θa.waː.bit al.wa.tˤa.nij.ja‿l.fi.las.tˤiː.nij.ja]) and sometimes referred to as the Palestinian red-lines, are a set of principles representing the core issues of Palestinian national consensus on the Israeli–Palestinian conflict. The term Thawabit was coined by the Palestinian National Council in 1977.

According to Khaled Elgindy, these principles include:

- the right to resistance,
- the right to self-determination (statehood),
- Jerusalem as the capital of Palestine, and
- the right of Palestinian refugees to return to their homes and lands in what is today Israel (in accordance with UNGA 194).

Shaked writes that the Thawabit, declared as Palestinians' inviolable national rights, "became the cornerstones of the ethos of conflict of the Palestinian society, featuring prominently in all cultural products, in the media, in the speeches of leaders, in official documents, in textbooks and in the daily life of the Palestinian society."

The Thawabit was reaffirmed in the 2005 Palestinian Cairo Declaration.

The Thawabit has also been cited by some American and British groups protesting the Gaza Genocide.

== See also ==
- Sumud
- Palestinian National Covenant
- PLO's Ten Point Program
