= Ahmad Shukeiri =

Palestinian nationalist leader (1908–1980)

Ahmad al-Shukeiri أحمد الشقيري
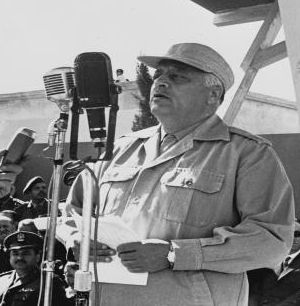
- Shukeiri in 1965

1st Chairman of the Palestine Liberation Organization
- In office 28 May 1964 – 24 December 1967
- Preceded by: Position established
- Succeeded by: Yahya Hammuda

Permanent Representative of Saudi Arabia to the United Nations
- In office 1957–1962

Personal details
- Born: 1 January 1908 Tibnin, Beirut vilayet, Ottoman Empire
- Died: 26 February 1980 (aged 72) Amman, Jordan

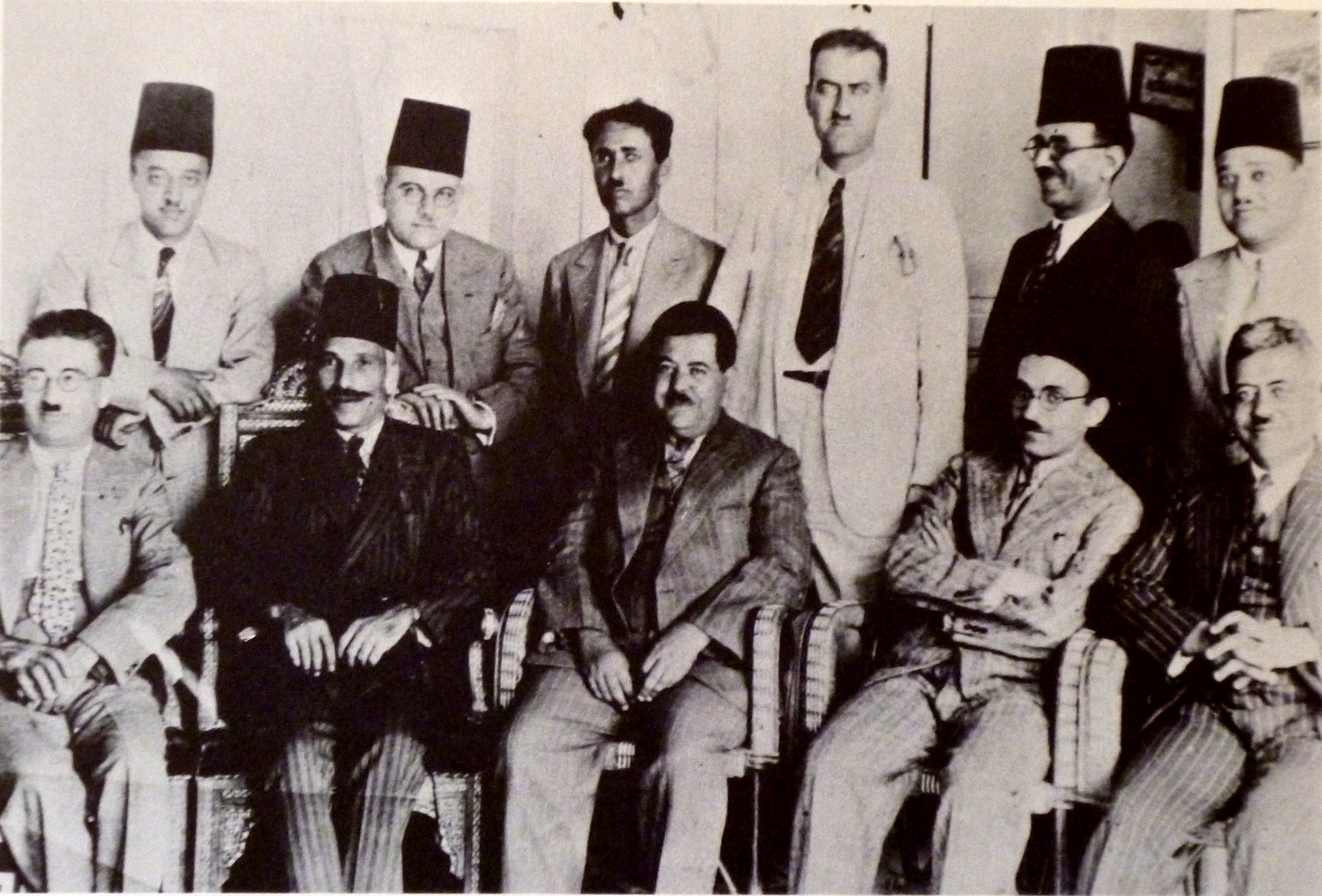
Shukeiri (standing first left) a founding member of Istiqlal, circa 1932

Ahmad al-Shukeiri (Arabic: أحمد الشقيري, also transliterated al-Shuqayri, Shuqairi, Shuqeiri, Shukeiry; 1 January 1908 – 26 February 1980) was a Palestinian political leader and the first chairman of the Palestine Liberation Organization, serving from 1964 to 1967.

== Early life ==
Shukeiri was born in Tebnine, south Lebanon, then Ottoman Empire, to a Turkish mother and a Palestinian father, As'ad Shukeiri (1860–1940), who was elected to the Ottoman Parliament in 1908 and 1912. Ahmad acquired the Turkish language from his mother. After studying law in the British law college in Jerusalem, he became a prominent lawyer in British Palestine and a member of the Independence Party (Istiqlal). In 1945 he went to Washington, D.C. to establish a Palestinian office and in 1946 joined the Arab Higher Committee.

== Political career ==
Shukeiri was a member of the Syrian delegation to the United Nations from 1949 to 1951. He then became assistant Secretary General for the Arab League from 1950 to 1956, Saudi ambassador to the United Nations from 1957 to 1962.

In December 1962, representing Saudi Arabia, he told the Special Political Committee of the United Nations General Assembly that the Tacuara movement had been formed to combat Zionism and he hoped it would spread in Latin America and its principles adopted by the United Nations. After receiving information about Tacuara from the Argentinian and Chilean delegations, he backed down, acknowledging that Tacuara was a fascist movement and claiming instead that it was more appropriate to compare Tacuara to Israel.

In 1963, the Arab League appointed him Representative of Palestine at the Arab League. At the 1964 Arab League summit (Cairo), he was given a mandate to initiate contacts aimed at establishing a Palestinian entity.

=== Chairman of the PLO ===
In May 1964, he was elected the first Chairman of the PLO (Palestine Liberation Organization) with the support of Egyptian leader Gamal Abdel Nasser.

From 28 May to 2 June 1964 Shukeiri and 396 nominated representatives from Jordan, Syria, Lebanon, the Gaza strip, Egypt, Qatar, Kuwait, Libya and Iraq attended a Palestinian Conference (the First Palestinian National Council in East Jerusalem). Delegates wore badges carrying a map of Palestine and inscribed "We shall return". The Times reported that following an introductory address by King Hussein of Jordan, Shukeiri told delegates that "Palestinians had experienced 16 years' misery and it was time they relied on themselves and liberated Palestine from the Israelis". The conference announced the establishment of the PLO as the representative of the Palestinian Arabs. Shukeiri and his colleagues also announced the formation of the Palestinian National Fund, and at the Second Arab Summit Conference in Alexandria in September 1964 of a military wing, the Palestine Liberation Army.

In March 1965, Shukeiri visited Beijing and negotiated the PLO's first arms agreement with China.

Prior to the Six Day War, Shukeiri, in an interview with Lebanese newspaper al-Yawm, stated "we will endeavor to assist [the Jews] and facilitate their departure by sea to their countries of origin." Regarding the fate of Israeli-born Jews, he replied: "Whoever survives will stay in Filastin, but in my opinion no one will remain alive.'

These statements gained little public attention at the time, but after the war, they were used as part of the Israeli government's justification of their initiation of active hostilities, utilizing a combined paraphrase of both statements and claiming that Shukeiri declared intention to "throw Jews into the sea".

Shukeiri initially denied having made such a statement, but was widely criticized and ostracized by Palestinian and Arab leadership for having weakened the international standing of the Arab cause, with Jordanian Prime Minister Saad Jumaa later stating "that [Shukeiri] is one of the direct causes for the catastrophe [the Arab defeat in the Six-Day War]. He had the appearance and bearings to play a role perfectly suited to him in the catastrophe of the Arab world and in Arab disputes, and unfortunately he fulfilled this function with alacrity and expertise."

In his 1971 apologia, Dialogues and Secrets with Kings, Shukeiri admitted usage of the phrase and similar language, claiming it reflected the accepted official Arab outlook at the time, but was "indignant that such extremism should be fathered on him alone."

=== Resignation ===
In the aftermath of the Six-Day War, Shukeiri resigned as PLO Chairman in December 1967, and was succeeded by Yahya Hammuda.

== Later life ==
Between 1968 and 1979, Shukeiri wrote more than twenty books dealing with the Palestinian cause and the Arab Unity.

He died on February 26, 1980, aged 72, in Amman, Jordan.

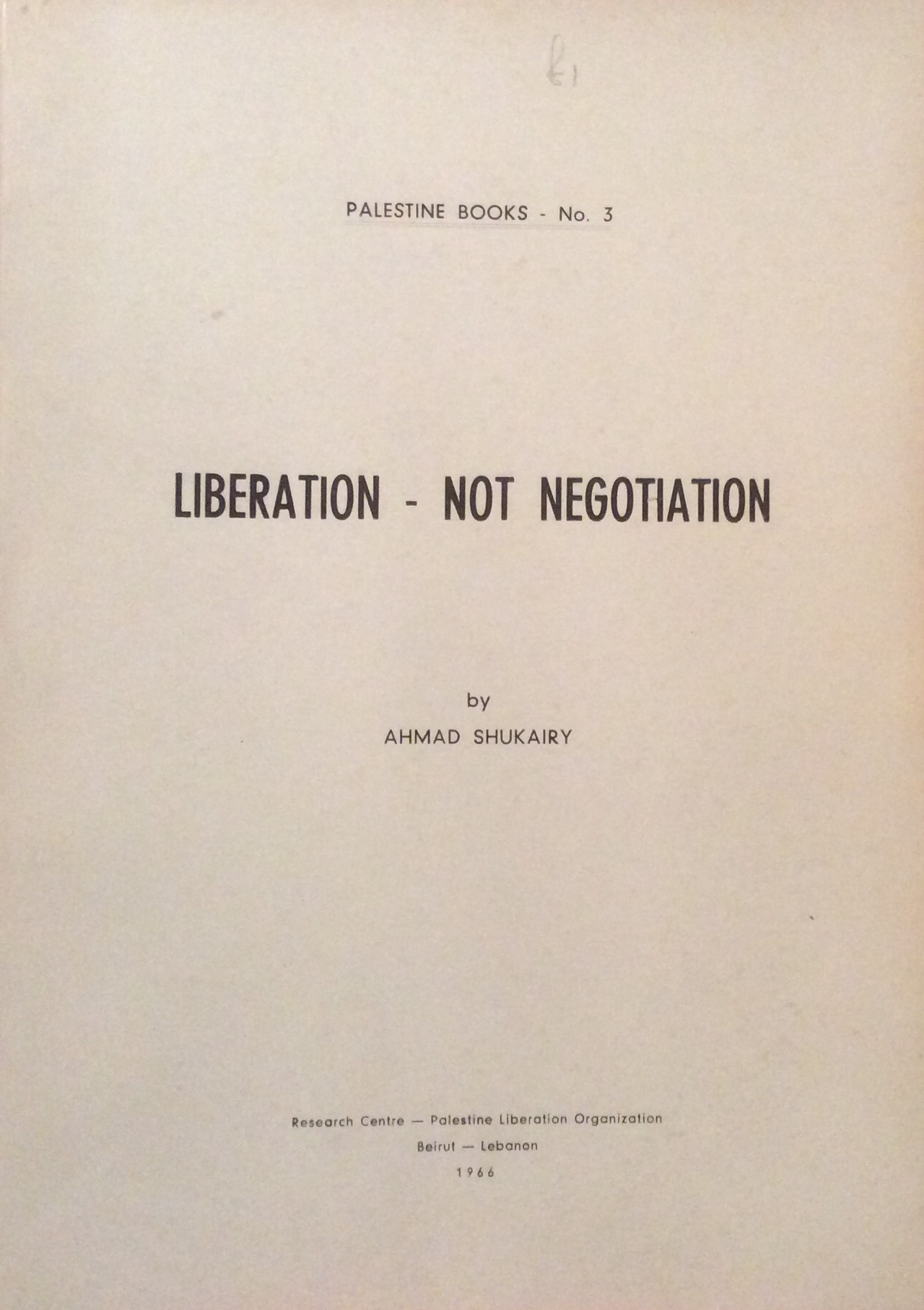
Liberation - Not Negotiation by Ahmad Shukairy, 1966

== Notes ==
| Preceded by - | Chairman of the Palestine Liberation Organization; 1964–1967 | Succeeded by Yahya Hammuda |
