= Muhammad Nimr al-Hawari =

Palestinian politician (1908–1984)

- محمد نمر الهواري
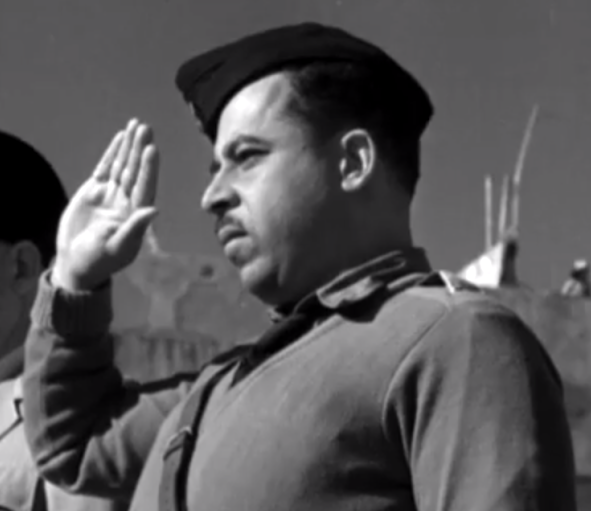
- Muhammad al-Hawari in 1947

President of the General Refugee Congress
- In office 17 March 1949 – Unknown

Personal details
- Born: 1908 Nazareth, Ottoman Empire
- Died: 11 July 1984 (aged 75–76) Nazareth, Israel
- Citizenship: Ottoman Empire; Mandatory Palestine; Kingdom of Egypt; State of Israel
- Known for: Al-Najjada

Muhammad Nimr al-Hawari (Arabic: محمد نمر الهواري; 1908 – July 11, 1984) was a Nazareth-born Palestinian who studied law in Jerusalem, graduating in 1939. Al-Hawari served in the British Mandate administration as chief interpreter in the district court of Jaffa and chairman of the Association of Government second-division officers. He was transferred to Haifa where he resigned his government position in 1942. On his resignation, he returned to practicing law in Jaffa. Al-Hawari started his career as a devoted follower of Amin al-Husseini but broke with the influential Husseini family in the early 1940s. Muhammad Nimr Al-Hawari, during the termination of the British mandate, formed and commanded al-Najjada, a paramilitary armed movement. Al-Hawari was in command of the militia in the defence of Jaffa until he fled in the mass exodus of Palestinians in late December 1947. Al-Hawari fled from Jaffa to Ramallah in December 1947. Al-Hawari together with ‘Aziz Shihada (also spelt Shehadeh) a lawyer from Ramallah opened an office in the West Bank for refugee affairs. Hawari returned to Palestine and years later became judge in the District Court of Nazareth.

In 1955, Muhammad Nimr Al-Hawari wrote and published a significant historic book titled, Sir Al-Nakba [The Secret Behind the Nakba]. As well as his native Arabic, Al-Hawari was fluent in English and Hebrew.

== General Refugee Congress ==
The first meeting of the General Refugee Congress (GRC) occurred on 17 March 1949 in Ramallah where al-Hawari was elected as president with Yahya Hammuda and 'Aziz Shihada as deputies. The Palestine Conciliation Commission (PCC) hoping to gain a degree of independent Palestinian representation, invited Al-Hawari to come and appear before the PCC.

At informal meetings at the Lausanne peace talks during May 1949, Al-Hawari as head of the Palestinian refugee delegation put forward to Eliahu Sasson a plan that Israel should accept 400,000 refugees to return to Palestine/Israel. A-Hawari put forward the argument that the Arab states did not want the refugees, would not assimilate them and that masses of refugees living on the cease fire lines, stateless and impoverished would give Israel nothing but grief. In June 1949 Al-Hawari contacted the Israeli Government suggesting an early solution to the refugee problem with 2 alternative plans; to create an independent Palestinian state or annex the West Bank to Israel.

The failure of the attempt by al-Hawari, Yahya Hammuda, 'Aziz Shihada, Sa’id Baidas and Francis Jelad to win a role for the independent refugee delegation at the Rhodes armistice talks in February 1949 and the subsequent Lausanne talks was an early demonstration of the weakness of the Palestinian Arab people to replace the previous leadership structure destroyed by the collapse of the Palestinian society during the 1948 conflict. Although efforts were made to gain formal recognition of the GRC as a negotiating body and political representative of the Palestinian people. The Jordanian Government gradually marginalized the GRC until it withered away. Leaving Palestinian society fractured and fragmented.

== All Palestine Government ==
Egypt sought the aid of Al-Hawari in early 1950 to strengthen the Mufti's political position, Al-Hawari did not comply.

== Iqrit ==
Al-Hawari was involved with the first legal action against the state of Israel in 1951 on behalf of 5 men of the village of Iqrit. Al-Hawari acting as their lawyer was instrumental in gaining the right of return for the men of Iqrit. On 31 July 1951 the Israeli courts recognized the rights of the villagers to their land and their right to return to it. The court said the land was not abandoned and therefore could not be placed under the custodian of enemy property.

== Published works ==
- Sir al-Nakba (The Secret Behind the Disaster), Nazareth – 1955

== Bibliography ==
- Yoav Gelber (2006) Palestine 1948, Sussex Academic Press, ISBN 978-1-84519-075-0
- Haim Levenberg (1993) "Military preparations of the Arab community in Palestine, 1945–1948: 1945–1948" Routledge ISBN 0-7146-3439-5
- Benny Morris (2008) 1948: A History of the First Arab-Israeli War. Yale University Press ISBN 978-0-300-12696-9
- Benny Morris (2004) "Birth of the Palestinian Refugee Problem Revisited" Cambridge Press ISBN 0-521-00967-7
- Joseph L. Ryan, S.J. "Refugees within Israel: The Case of the Villages of Kafr Bir'im and Iqrit" Journal of Palestinian studies 2, no. 4 (Sum. 73): 55–81.
- Ilan Pappé, (2006) The Ethnic Cleansing of Palestine Oneworld publications ISBN 978-1-85168-467-0
- Ilan Pappé (1992) "The Making of the Arab-Israeli Conflict 1947–1951" I B Tauris ISBN 1-85043-819-6
- Avi Plascov (1981), "The Palestinian refugees in Jordan 1948–1957" Routledge ISBN 0-7146-3120-5
- Yezid Sayigh (1999) Armed Struggle and the Search for State: The Palestinian National Movement 1949–1993. Oxford University Press ISBN 0-19-829643-6
- Avi Shlaim (1988 reprinted 2004) "The Politics of Partition; King Abdullah, The Zionists, and Palestine 1921–1951 Oxford University Press ISBN 0-19-829459-X
