= Meir Rosenne =

Israeli lawyer and diplomat (1931–2015)

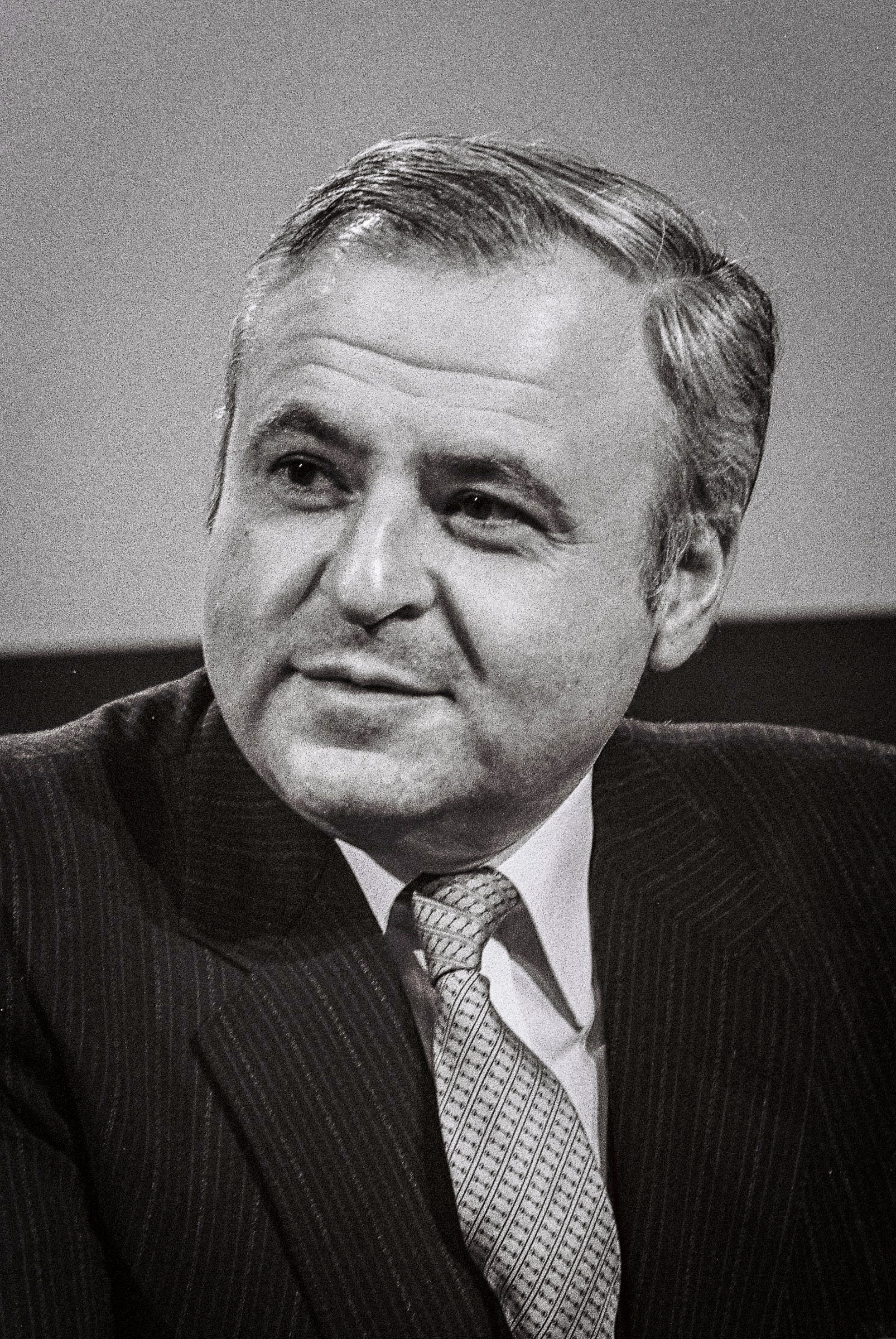
- Meir Rosenne by Claude Truong-Ngoc (1979)

Legal adviser for the Israeli Ministry of Foreign Affairs
- In office 1971–1979
- Preceded by: Theodor Meron
- Succeeded by: Ruth Lapidoth

Israeli Ambassador in France
- In office 1979–1983

Israeli Ambassador in the United States
- In office 1983–1987
- Preceded by: Moshe Arens
- Succeeded by: Moshe Arad

Personal details
- Born: 19 February 1931 Iași, Kingdom of Romania
- Died: 14 April 2015 (aged 84)

Meir Rosenne (Hebrew: מאיר רוזן; 19 February 1931 – 14 April 2015) was an Israeli lawyer and diplomat.

== Biography ==
Meir Rosenhaupt (later Rosenne) was born in Iași, Kingdom of Romania. In 1941 he witnessed the Iași pogrom. He immigrated to Mandatory Palestine in 1944, escaping from Europe on the Turkish boat Kazbek which departed from the Romanian port of Constanţa.

In the 1950s he studied law at the Sorbonne and obtained his Ph.D. in 1957.

Rosenne died on 14 April 2015, aged 84.

== Diplomatic career ==
Rosenne joined the foreign service in 1953 and served between 1961 and 1967 as consul in New York. From 1971 until 1979 he served as legal adviser to the Israeli Ministry of Foreign Affairs and played an important part in the negotiations for the Camp David Accords and the Israeli-Egyptian peace treaty. From 1979 until 1983 he served as the Israeli ambassador to France, and from 1983 until 1987 as the Israeli ambassador to the United States. In 1987 Rosenne retired from the diplomatic service. From 1989 until 1994 he served as president of the Israel Bonds Organization.

== Legal and public career ==
Rosenne was a senior partner at the Balter, Guth, Aloni Law firm in Israel and was active with various Zionist organizations. Rosenne taught international law at the Hebrew University in Jerusalem. He was known for supporting Israeli policies regarding the Palestinian-Israeli conflict in his writings and activities worldwide.

== Awards and recognition ==
In memoriam, Colette Avital writes: "Until the end of his life, he remained a staunch defender of Israel, granting TV and radio interviews during which he often quoted relevant clauses in agreements signed by the State of Israel or in international conventions by which it was bound".

- Commander of the French National Order of the Legion d'Honneur (2000)
