= United Nations General Assembly Resolution 194 =

UN General Assembly Resolution 194
- Date: December 11 1948
- Meeting no.: 186
- Code: A/RES/194 (III) (Document)
- Subject: Palestine—Progress Report of the United Nations Mediator
- Voting summary: 35 voted for; 15 voted against; 8 abstained
- Result: Adopted

The United Nations General Assembly Resolution 194 is a resolution adopted near the end of the 1948 Palestine war. The Resolution defines principles for reaching a final settlement and returning Palestine refugees to their homes. Article 11 of the resolution resolves that

refugees wishing to return to their homes and live at peace with their neighbours should be permitted to do so at the earliest practicable date, and that compensation should be paid for the property of those choosing not to return and for loss of or damage to property which, under principles of international law or equity, should be made good by the Governments or authorities responsible.

The resolution also calls for the establishment of the United Nations Conciliation Commission to facilitate peace between Israel and Arab states, continuing the efforts of UN Mediator Folke Bernadotte, following his assassination.

Of the 58 members of the United Nations at that time, the resolution was adopted by a majority of 35 countries, with 15 voting against and 8 abstaining. The six Arab League countries then represented at the UN, who were also involved in the war, voted against the resolution. The other significant group which voted against comprised the Communist bloc member countries, all of which had already recognized Israel as a de jure state. Israel was not a member of the United Nations at the time, and objected to many of the resolution's articles. Palestinian representatives likewise rejected Resolution 194.

The resolution, especially Article 11, was cited in United Nations General Assembly Resolution 302 establishing the UNRWA and other UN resolutions. It has been argued that the resolution enshrines a right of return for the Palestinian refugees, a claim that Israel disputes.

== Background ==
During the 1948 Palestine war, around 700,000 (Note: The exact number of refugees is disputed. See List of estimates of the Palestinian Refugee flight of 1948 for details.) Palestinian Arabs or 85% of the total population fled or were expelled from the territory Israel conquered. The UN Mediator for Palestine, Count Folke Bernadotte, believed that the Palestinians displaced had a right to return to their homes and wrote several UN reports to that effect. On June 28, 1948, during a truce he had arranged, he presented a series of suggestions for a peaceful settlement of the Palestine dispute. One of them was that the UN should recognize "the right of residents of Palestine who, because of conditions created by the conflict there have left their normal places of abode, to return to their homes without restriction and to regain possession of their property." Another was to incorporate Jerusalem into Arab territory which angered the Israelis. In the report he presented on September 16, he wrote:

It would be an offence against the principles of elemental justice if these innocent victims of the conflict were denied the right to return to their homes while Jewish immigrants flow into Palestine, and, indeed, at least offer the threat of permanent replacement of the Arab refugees who have been rooted in the land for centuries.

In the report, he argued that "[t]he right of Arab refugees to return to their homes in Jewish-controlled territory at the earliest possible date should be affirmed by the United Nations" and that the UN should supervise payment of "adequate compensation for the property" of those choosing not to return. Israel publicly rejected the report, but Foreign Minister Moshe Sharett acknowledged that "[i]t is not so nice or humanitarian to oppose something which is so basic, so simple: a person's right to return to the home from which he has been driven out by force."

While Bernadotte was assassinated by Jewish paramilitaries, his insistence on a right of return for the refugees formed the basis of resolution 194.

== Views ==
Several organizations and individuals believe that resolution 194 enshrines a right for the Palestinian refugees to return to their homes in territory that Israel occupied in the 1948 war. The UN General Assembly has reaffirmed Resolution 194 every year since 1949 and other UN resolutions have reaffirmed the right of return, including General Assembly Resolution 169 in 1980.

Joshua Muravchik does not believe that resolution 194 enshrines a right of return, pointing out that the text states that the refugees "should be permitted" to return to their homes at the "earliest practicable date" and this recommendation applies only to those "wishing to... live at peace with their neighbors".

=== Palestinian and Arab views ===
The Arab states originally voted against resolution 194, but they began to reverse their position by spring 1949 and soon became its strongest advocates. The 2002 Arab Peace Initiative softened their stance by calling for "a just solution which must also be accepted by Israel."

Palestinian representatives initially rejected resolution 194 because they viewed it as being based on the illegality of the state of Israel. By their reasoning, Israel had no right to prevent the return of the "indigenous Arab people of Palestine". Later, the Palestine Liberation Organization (PLO) and other Palestinian organizations has come to view resolution 194 as one source of legal authority for the right of return. In an address in 2009, Palestinian President Mahmoud Abbas stated:

This is in order to reach a comprehensive and balanced political solution to the conflict that ... will guarantee the rights of the Palestinian refugees to return to their homes in accordance with the legitimate international decisions and first and foremost Resolution 194.

Abbas has on other several occasions referred to a "just solution" to the Palestinian refugees "on the basis of Resolution 194". Hanan Ashrawi, a member of the PLO Executive Committee has similarly declared that resolution 194 enshrines a non-negotiable right of return:

One must recognize rights according to international law and Resolution 194 of the United Nations. There is not a single Palestinian who will forgo the rights of the refugees. A leader who will tell you he will do this in order to propitiate you will lose credibility among his own people.

The Palestinian-led BDS movement asserts that Israel must comply with international law by, among other things, "[r]especting, protecting and promoting the rights of Palestinian refugees to return to their homes and properties as stipulated in UN Resolution 194."

=== Israeli view ===
Israel does not believe that it has an obligation to let the refugees return, a view was promulgated by the Israeli leadership even before resolution 194 was adopted. In a cabinet meeting in June 1948 Israel's first Prime Minister, David Ben-Gurion stated: "They [the Palestinians] lost and fled. Their return must now be prevented.... And I will oppose their return also after the war." Ben-Gurion's words were echoed by Prime Minister Yitzhak Shamir who in 1992 declared that the return of the Palestinian refugees "will never happen in any way, shape or form. There is only a Jewish right of return to the land of Israel."

Israel also argued that it did not have to compensate refugees for land and property that they had abandoned. In a press conference in 1949, Sharett stated:

To help finance resettlement projects in neighbouring countries Israel is prepared to pay compensation for land abandoned in Israel by Arabs who have fled. This, again, can only be arranged as part of a general peace settlement. For when peace is negotiated the payment of compensation by Israel for land abandoned by Arabs will not be the only financial item discussed. Israel will claim damages from the aggressor States for losses sustained as the result of their aggression and the crushing burden of war expenditures inflicted upon its population.

In the debates about UN resolution 273 in May 1949, about Israel's admittance to the UN, Israel's UN representative Abba Eban promised that the state would honor its obligations under resolution 181 and resolution 194. El Salvador's representative asked:

I wish to ask the representative of Israel whether he is authorized by his Government to assure the Committee that the State of Israel will do everything in its power to co-operate with the United Nations in order to put into effect (a) the General Assembly resolution of 29 November 1947 on the internationalization of the City of Jerusalem and the surrounding area [resolution 181] and (b) the General Assembly resolution of 11 December 1948 on the repatriation of the refugees [resolution 194].

Eban replied:

I can give unqualified affirmative answer to the second question as to whether we will co-operate with the organs of the United Nations with all the means at our disposal in the fulfillment of the resolution concerning refugees. I cannot honestly conceal from the Committee that even our full co-operation with all the means at our disposal will not avail to solve this question unless it is considered against the general background of the Near East and unless similar co-operation from other neighbouring Governments and a large measure of international assistance are invested in the solution of this problem on a regional basis.

Israel was thus admitted to the United Nations in May 1949 on condition that it "unreservedly accepts the obligations of the UN Charter and undertakes to honour them from the day when it becomes a member of the UN." But Israel didn't comply with the right of return as reaffirmed in resolution 194.

Israel has offered to repatriate a number of refugees as part of negotiations: see the Lausanne Conference (April-September 1949), the 2000 Camp David negotiations, and Israeli–Palestinian peace process, §Camp David 2000 Summit, Clinton's "Parameters," and the Taba talks.

=== Polling ===
The Palestinian people have demonstrated strong support for a right of return based on resolution 194. In a 1999 poll by Elia Zureik, some 61.4% of the Palestinians in Israel said that a proper solution to the refugee issue should be based on resolution 194 and about half found such a solution feasible; in the occupied Palestinian territories, over 80% of the Palestinians considered resolution 194 to be a just solution to the refugee problem, and about 50% thought implementing 194 was feasible. In contrast, fewer than 5% of Jewish Israeli respondents thought resolution 194 was either just or feasible.

== Voting results ==
The result of the voting was the following:

In Favor Argentina, Australia, Belgium, Brazil, Canada, China, Colombia, Denmark, Dominican Republic, Ecuador, El Salvador, Ethiopia, France, Greece, Haiti, Honduras, Iceland, Liberia, Luxembourg, Netherlands, New Zealand, Nicaragua, Norway, Panama, Paraguay, Peru, Philippines, South Africa, Sweden, Thailand, Turkey, United Kingdom, United States, Uruguay, Venezuela.

Against Afghanistan, Byelorrusian SSR, Cuba, Czechoslovakia, Egypt, Iraq, Lebanon, Pakistan, Poland, Saudi Arabia, Syria, Ukrainian SSR, USSR, Yemen, Yugoslavia.

Abstaining Bolivia, Burma, Chile, Costa Rica, Guatemala, India, Iran, Mexico.

== Related resolutions ==
Adopted in the aftermath of the Six-Day War in 1967, Security Council Resolution 237 called upon Israel "to facilitate the return of those inhabitants who have fled the areas [occupied by Israel] since the outbreak of hostilities".

UN Resolution 3236 & 3237 adopted in 1974, and UN Resolution 3379 adopted in 1975 which determined that Palestine have international representation for self-determination, UN Assembly observer status, and that the Palestinian people seek redress having been subjected to racial discrimination respectively.

== Full text ==
The General Assembly,

Having considered further the situation in Palestine,

1. Expresses its deep appreciation of the progress achieved through the good offices of the late United Nations Mediator in promoting a peaceful adjustment of the future situation of Palestine, for which cause he sacrificed his life; and Extends its thanks to the Acting Mediator and his staff for their continued efforts and devotion to duty in Palestine;
2. Establishes a Conciliation Commission consisting of three States Members of the United Nations which shall have the following functions:
  1. To assume, insofar as it considers necessary in existing circumstances, the functions given to the United Nations Mediator on Palestine by resolution 186 (S-2) of the General Assembly of 14 May 1948;
  2. To carry out the specific functions and directives given to it by the present resolution and such additional functions and directives as may be given to it by the General Assembly or by the Security Council;
  3. To undertake, upon the request of the Security Council, any of the functions now assigned to the United Nations Mediator on Palestine or to the United Nations Truce Commission by resolutions of the Security Council; upon such request to the Conciliation Commission by the Security Council with respect to all the remaining functions of the United Nations Mediator on Palestine under Security Council resolutions, the office of the Mediator shall be terminated;
3. Decides that a Committee of the Assembly, consisting of China, France, the Union of Soviet Socialist Republics, the United Kingdom and the United States of America, shall present, before the end of the first part of the present session of the General Assembly, for the approval of the Assembly, a proposal concerning the names of the three States which will constitute the Conciliation Commission;
4. Requests the Commission to begin its functions at once, with a view to the establishment of contact between the parties themselves and the Commission at the earliest possible date;
5. Calls upon the Governments and authorities concerned to extend the scope of the negotiations provided for in the Security Council's resolution of 16 November 1948 and to seek agreement by negotiations conducted either with the Conciliation Commission or directly with a view to the final settlement of all questions outstanding between them;
6. Instructs the Conciliation Commission to take steps to assist the Government and authorities concerned to achieve a final settlement of all questions outstanding between them;
7. Resolves that the Holy Places—including Nazareth—religious buildings and sites in Palestine should be protected and free access to them assured, in accordance with existing rights and historical practice that arrangements to this end should be under effective United Nations supervision; that the United Nations Conciliation Commission, in presenting to the fourth regular session of the General Assembly its detailed proposal for a permanent international regime for the territory of Jerusalem, should include recommendations concerning the Holy Places in that territory; that with regard to the Holy Places in the rest of Palestine the Commission should call upon the political authorities of the areas concerned to give appropriate formal guarantees as to the protection of the Holy Places and access to them; and that these undertakings should be presented to the General Assembly for approval;
8. Resolves that, in view of its association with three world religions, the Jerusalem area, including the present municipality of Jerusalem plus the surrounding villages and towns, the most Eastern of which shall be Abu Dis; the most Southern, Bethlehem; the most Western, Ein Karim (including also the built-up area of Motsa); and the most Northern, Shu'fat, should be accorded special and separate treatment from the rest of Palestine and should be placed under effective United Nations control; Requests the Security Council to take further steps to ensure the demilitarization of Jerusalem at the earliest possible date; Instructs the Conciliation Commission to present to the fourth regular session of the General Assembly detailed proposals for a permanent international regime for the Jerusalem area which will provide for the maximum local autonomy for distinctive groups consistent with the special international status of the Jerusalem area; The Conciliation Commission is authorized to appoint a United Nations representative who shall cooperate with the local authorities with respect to the interim administration of the Jerusalem area;
9. Resolves that, pending agreement on more detailed arrangements among the Governments and authorities concerned, the freest possible access to Jerusalem by road, rail or air should be accorded to all inhabitants of Palestine; Instructs the Conciliation Commission to report immediately to the Security Council, for appropriate action by that organ, any attempt by any party to impede such access;
10. Instructs the Conciliation Commission to seek arrangements among the Governments and authorities concerned which will facilitate the economic development of the area, including arrangements for access to ports and airfields and the use of transportation and communication facilities;
11. Resolves that the refugees wishing to return to their homes and live at peace with their neighbours should be permitted to do so at the earliest practicable date, and that compensation should be paid for the property of those choosing not to return and for loss of or damage to property which, under principles of international law or in equity, should be made good by the Governments or authorities responsible; Instructs the Conciliation Commission to facilitate the repatriation, resettlement and economic and social rehabilitation of the refugees and the payment of compensation, and to maintain close relations with the Director of the United Nations Relief for Palestine Refugees and, through him, with the appropriate organs and agencies of the United Nations;
12. Authorizes the Conciliation Commission to appoint such subsidiary bodies and to employ such technical experts, acting under its authority, as it may find necessary for the effective discharge of its functions and responsibilities under the present resolution; The Conciliation Commission will have its official headquarters at Jerusalem. The authorities responsible for maintaining order in Jerusalem will be responsible for taking all measures necessary to ensure the security of the Commission. The Secretary-General will provide a limited number of guards for the protection of the staff and premises of the Commission;
13. Instructs the Conciliation Commission to render progress reports periodically to the Secretary-General for transmission to the Security Council and to the Members of the United Nations;
14. Calls upon all Governments and authorities concerned to cooperate with the Conciliation Commission and to take all possible steps to assist in the implementation of the present resolution;
15. Requests the Secretary-General to provide the necessary staff and facilities and to make appropriate arrangements to provide the necessary funds required in carrying out the terms of the present resolution.

== See also ==
- Jewish refugees
- Lausanne Conference of 1949
- List of the UN resolutions concerning Israel
- List of the UN resolutions concerning Palestine
- Palestinian refugees
- United Nations Conciliation Commission
- United Nations General Assembly Resolution 3236 (XXIX)
- UNRWA
