= United Nations Conciliation Commission for Palestine =

UN group to mediate the Arab-Israeli conflict

The United Nations Conciliation Commission for Palestine (UNCCP) or Palestine Conciliation Commission (PCC) was created by UN-resolution 194 of December 11, 1948, with the aim of mediating in the Arab–Israeli conflict. The Commission consisted of France, Turkey and the United States, and its official headquarters was set up in Jerusalem on January 24, 1949. The commission met separately with Israeli and Arab governments from February 12–25, 1949, with Muhammad Nimr al-Hawari of the General Refugee Congress (GRC) and a Palestinian refugee delegation on March 21 in Beirut, and on April 7 in Tel Aviv with Israeli prime minister David Ben-Gurion. It then proposed the Lausanne Conference of 1949.

After the failure of that conference, the Conciliation Commission continued for additional years but did not achieve any significant success.

The Conciliation Commission followed the assassination of the UN mediator Count Folke Bernadotte.

== Organization ==
The Conciliation Commission established its headquarters and offices on January 24, 1949, at the "Government House," in a neutral demilitarized zone of Jerusalem. The first members were Claude de Boisanger (France), Mark F. Ethridge (USA) and Hussein C. Yalcin (Turkey).

General matters were discussed in a "General Committee." The Commission set up the "Committee on Jerusalem" (the "Special Committee") to prepare proposals for a permanent international regime for the territory of Jerusalem. It started on February 8, 1949, with three members: Philippe Benoist (France); Mr Yenisey (soon replaced by Orhan Eralp) (Turkey); and Mr Haldeman (soon, replaced by James W. Barco) (USA).

On August 23, 1949, the Commission established a subsidiary body, the "United Nations Economic Survey Mission for the Middle East" with the goal of "examining the economic situation in the countries affected by the recent hostilities in Palestine and making recommendations to the Commission". The initial report of the mission identified Palestinian refugees as "the symbol of the paramount political issue" and considered broad methods to potentially relieve their conditions. The UN's Economic Survey Mission for the Middle East would also become known as the "Clapp Mission," named after its Chairman, Gordon R. Clapp, the then-current Chairman of the Tennessee Valley Authority. The mission's final report included more detail than the initial report and was issued on December 28, 1949.

== Directives from Resolution 194 ==
The Conciliation Commission was established on December 11, 1948, by UN-resolution 194. The Commission took over the tasks of UN mediator Count Folke Bernadotte, who had been assassinated on September 17, 1948, by Jewish assassins from the Stern Gang.

The resolution provided some directives:

Establishment

A Conciliation Commission consisting of three States Members of the United Nations which shall have the following functions:

- To assume, in so far as it considers necessary in existing circumstances, the functions given to the United Nations Mediator on Palestine by resolution 186 (S-2) of the General Assembly of May 14, 1948;

- To carry out the specific functions and directives given to it by the present resolution and such additional functions and directives as may be given to it by the General Assembly or by the Security Council;

- To undertake, upon the request of the Security Council, any of the functions now assigned to the United Nations Mediator on Palestine or to the United Nations Truce Commission by resolutions of the Security Council; upon such request to the Conciliation Commission by the Security Council with respect to all the remaining functions of the United Nations Mediator on Palestine under Security Council resolutions, the office of the Mediator shall be terminated;

Appointing of members

Decides that a Committee of the Assembly, consisting of Republic of China, France, the Soviet Union, the United Kingdom and the United States, shall present, before the end of the first part of the present session of the General Assembly, for the approval of the Assembly, a proposal concerning the names of the three States which will constitute the Conciliation Commission;

Mandate to begin

Requests the Commission to begin its functions at once, with a view to the establishment of contact between the parties themselves and the Commission at the earliest possible date;

Requests to Governments

Calls upon the Governments and authorities concerned to extend the scope of the negotiations provided for in the Security Council's resolution of November 16, 1948, and to seek agreement by negotiations conducted either with the Conciliation Commission or directly with a view to the final settlement of all questions outstanding between them;

Requirement of the Commission to assist

Instructs the Conciliation Commission to take steps to assist the Government and authorities concerned to achieve a final settlement of all questions outstanding between them;

Holy Places

Resolves that the Holy Places—including Nazareth—religious buildings and sites in Palestine should be protected and free access to them assured, in accordance with existing rights and historical practice that arrangements to this end should be under effective United Nations supervision; that the United Nations Conciliation Commission, in presenting to the fourth regular session of the General Assembly its detailed proposal for a permanent international regime for the territory of Jerusalem, should include recommendations concerning the Holy Places in that territory; that with regard to the Holy Places in the rest of Palestine, the Commission should call upon the political authorities of the areas concerned to give appropriate formal guarantees as to the protection of the Holy Places and access to them; and that these undertakings should be presented to the General Assembly for approval;

Recognition of the special status of Jerusalem

Resolves that, in view of its association with three world religions, the Jerusalem area, including the present municipality of Jerusalem plus the surrounding villages and towns, the most Eastern of which shall be Abu Dis; the most Southern, Bethlehem; the most Western, Ein Karim (including also the built-up area of Motsa); and the most Northern, Shu'fat, should be accorded special and separate treatment from the rest of Palestine and should be placed under effective United Nations control;

- Demilitarization of

Requests the Security Council to take further steps to ensure the demilitarization of Jerusalem at the earliest possible date;

- Separate control

Instructs the Conciliation Commission to present to the fourth regular session of the General Assembly detailed proposals for a permanent international regime for the Jerusalem area which will provide for the maximum local autonomy for distinctive groups consistent with the special international status of Jerusalem area;

- United Nations Coordinator

The Conciliation Commission is authorized to appoint a United Nations representative who shall cooperate with the local authorities with respect to the interim administration of the Jerusalem area;

- Access to

Resolves that, pending agreement on more detailed arrangements among the Governments and authorities concerned, the freest possible access to Jerusalem by road, rail or air should be accorded to all inhabitants of Palestine;

- Attempts to impede the right of access

Instructs the Conciliation Commission to report immediately to the Security Council, for appropriate action by that organ, any attempt by any party to impede such access;

Airfields, ports, transportation, and communication

Instructs the Conciliation Commission to seek arrangements among the Governments and authorities concerned which will facilitate the economic development of the area, including arrangements for access to ports and airfields and the use of transportation and communication facilities;

Right of return

Resolves that the refugees wishing to return to their homes and live at peace with their neighbours should be permitted to do so at the earliest practicable date and that compensation should be paid for the property of those choosing not to return and for loss of or damage to property which, under principles of international law or in equity, should be made good by the Governments or authorities responsible;

Repatriation, resettlement and economic and social rehabilitation

Instructs the Conciliation Commission to facilitate the repatriation, resettlement and economic and social rehabilitation of the refugees and the payment of compensation, and to maintain close relations with the Director of the United Nations Relief for Palestine Refugees and, through him, with the appropriate organs and agencies of the United Nations;

Subsidiary bodies and technical experts

Authorizes the Conciliation Commission to appoint such subsidiary bodies and to employ such technical experts, acting under its authority, as it may find necessary for the effective discharge of its functions and responsibilities under the present resolution;

Location and protection of headquarters

The Conciliation Commission will have its official headquarters in Jerusalem. The authorities responsible for maintaining order in Jerusalem will be responsible for taking all measures necessary to ensure the security of the Commission. The Secretary-General will provide a limited number of guards for the protection of the staff and premises of the Commission;

Progress reports

Instructs the Conciliation Commission to render progress reports periodically to the Secretary-General for transmission to the Security Council and to the Members of the United Nations;

Call for cooperation

Calls upon all Governments and authorities concerned to cooperate with the Conciliation Commission and to take all possible steps to assist in the implementation of the present resolution;

== Table of reports ==
Date	Number	Title
15-03-1949	A/819	FIRST PROGRESS REPORT
19-04-1949	A/838	SECOND PROGRESS REPORT
21-06-1949	A/927	THIRD PROGRESS REPORT (with Lausanne Protocol)
22-09-1949	A/992	FOURTH PROGRESS REPORT 9 June to 15 September 1949
18-07-1949	A/AC.25/W/17	NOTE ON CURRENCY AND BANKING IN PALESTINE AND TRANSJORDAN
30-07-1949	A/AC.25/W/19	Working paper - background study of the proposals 1937-1949
14-12-1949	A/1252	FIFTH PROGRESS REPORT 16 September to 9 December 1949
23-10-1950	A/1367/Rev.1	GENERAL PROGRESS REPORT AND SUPPLEMENTARY REPORT 11 December 1949 to 23 October 1950
20-11-1951	A/1985	PROGRESS REPORT 23 January to 19 November 1951

== Reports of preceding Mediator ==
Date	Number	Title
28-06-1948	S/863	TEXT OF SUGGESTIONS PRESENTED BY THE UNITED NATIONS MEDIATOR ON PALESTINE TO THE TWO PARTIES ON 28 JUNE 1948. First proposals
12-07-1948	S/888	REPORT ... TO THE SECURITY COUNCIL
16-09-1948	S/1025	REPORT ... ON THE OBSERVATION OF THE TRUCE IN PALESTINE 11 June to 9 July 1948
16-09-1948	A/648	General progress report 14-05-1948 to 16-09-1948 (sent the day before his death!)
18-10-1948	A/689	PROGRESS REPORT OF THE ACTING MEDIATOR FOR PALESTINE SUBMITTED TO THE SECRETARY-GENERAL FOR TRANSMISSION TO THE MEMBERS OF THE UNITED NATIONS - (Supplement to Document A/648 (Part Three)). Arab refugees (Intro also on http://unispal.un.org/UNISPAL.NSF/0/1F37F42455295188852574C20073000C)
19-10-48	A/689/Add.1	Appendices to A/689. Number of refugees; needs; supplies

== See also ==
- 1948 Arab–Israeli War
- 1948 Palestinian expulsion and flight
- Folke Bernadotte § UN mediator
- Jewish exodus from the Muslim world
- Lausanne Conference of 1949
- List of estimates of the 1948 Palestinian expulsion and flight
- Palestinian right of return
- United Nations General Assembly Resolution 194
