= 1949 Lausanne Conference =

1949 diplomatic summit

The Lausanne Conference of 1949 was convened by the United Nations Conciliation Commission for Palestine (UNCCP) from 27 April to 12 September 1949 in Lausanne, Switzerland. Representatives of Israel, the Arab states of Egypt, Jordan, Lebanon and Syria, and the Arab Higher Committee and a number of refugee delegations were in attendance to resolve disputes arising from the 1948 Arab–Israeli War, mainly about refugees and territories in connection with Resolution 194 and Resolution 181.

== Background ==
After the adoption of the UN Partition Plan and the end of the British Mandate, the Yishuv (Zionist settlement in Palestine) proclaimed the State of Israel. During the 1947-1948 Civil War in Mandatory Palestine and the 1948 Arab–Israeli War that followed, around 700,000 Palestinian Arabs fled or were expelled from the area that became Israel. More than 500 Arab villages, and about ten Jewish villages and neighborhoods, were depopulated during the 1948 war.

The Conciliation Commission for Palestine was established on 11 December 1948 by UN resolution 194. One month before the Lausanne Conference, on 29 March 1949, a military coup took place in Syria. Between 6 January and 3 April 1949, armistice agreements were signed by Israel, Egypt, Lebanon and Jordan. On 20 July 1949, an armistice agreement with Syria was signed. During the Conference, on 11 May, Israel was admitted as member of the United Nations.

== Subjects of the negotiations ==
Amongst the issues discussed were territorial questions and the establishment of recognized borders, the question of Jerusalem, the repatriation of refugees (and whether the issue could be discussed separately from the overall Arab–Israeli conflict), Israeli counter-claims for war damages, the fate of orange groves belonging to Arab refugees and of their bank accounts blocked in Israel.

== The Lausanne Protocol ==
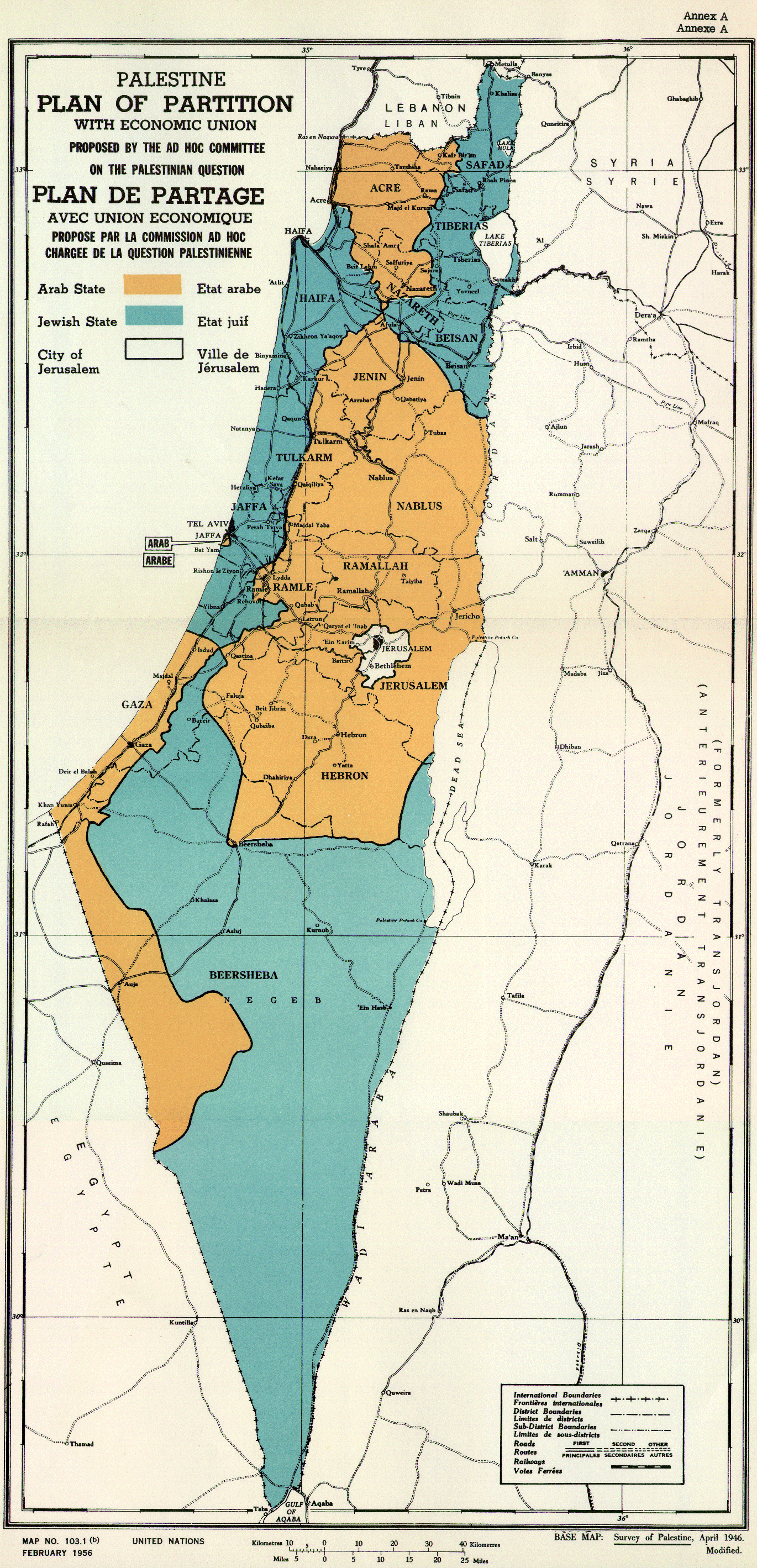
Partition map

On 12 May 1949, the parties signed the Lausanne Protocol. Annexed to the protocol was a copy of the partition map of Resolution 181. The UNCCP's third progress reports states that while the map was to form the basis for discussion, adjustments of its boundaries could be proposed.

Israel's signature on the protocol soon became a bone of contention. Israel argued that the protocol was merely a "procedural device" and that its signature did not imply an acceptance of the 1947 partition borders. Arab leaders, on the other hand, argued that it did. Walter Eyan, the protocol's Israeli signatory, later claimed that he had signed the document under duress.

== Basic positions ==
The conditions for negotiation were complex, as the questions of refugees and of territories were closely linked. The Arab participants only wanted to act en bloc. Israel only wanted to negotiate with separate states. As the Arab delegations refused to talk directly with Israel, the Conciliation Commission shuttled back and forth between the parties. Israel also refused to negotiate on any point separately; it wanted to settle all problems at once within the framework of a general settlement. Israel's positions have been described as follows: "the two main bones of contention were refuguees and territory. Israel's position on the former was clear and emphatic: the Arab states were responsible for the refugee problem, so responsibility for solving it rested with them. Israel was willing to make a modest financial contribution toward the resolution of this problem but only as part of an overall settlement of the conflict and only if the refugees were to be resettled in Arab countries. On the second issue Israel's position was that the permanent borders between itself and its neighbors should be based on the cease-fire lines, with only minor adjustments."

The Arabs wanted to negotiate on the basis of UN resolutions 194 and 181. They wanted Israel to accept first the "right to return". Israel rejected the principle of "repatriation of the refugees and payment of due compensation for their lost or damaged property, as well as for the property of those who do not wish to return" as formulated in Resolution 194, and asked large amounts of land in exchange for return of a limited number of refugees. The Arabs wanted recognition of the areas allotted to them by the Partition Plan and immediate return of the refugees coming from the areas that were conquered by Israel.

=== U.S. position ===
In a memo of 27 May 1949 to U.S. president Harry S. Truman, the Department of State reported Israel's territorial demands and its refusal to compromise on the refugee problem. The territorial demands included a piece of southeastern Lebanon, the Gaza Strip, and parts of Transjordan as well as those portions of "Arab Palestine" defined by the UN that Israel had occupied. The memo noted the Israeli intentions to bring about a change in the US positions through their own means, and the Israeli threat to obtain additional territory by force. According to the memo, the Lausanne Conference was likely to break up when the Arabs learned of the refusal of Israel to make any concessions on territory or refugees. The memo recommended to take measures and reconsider the US relations with Israel, if she would not respond favorably.

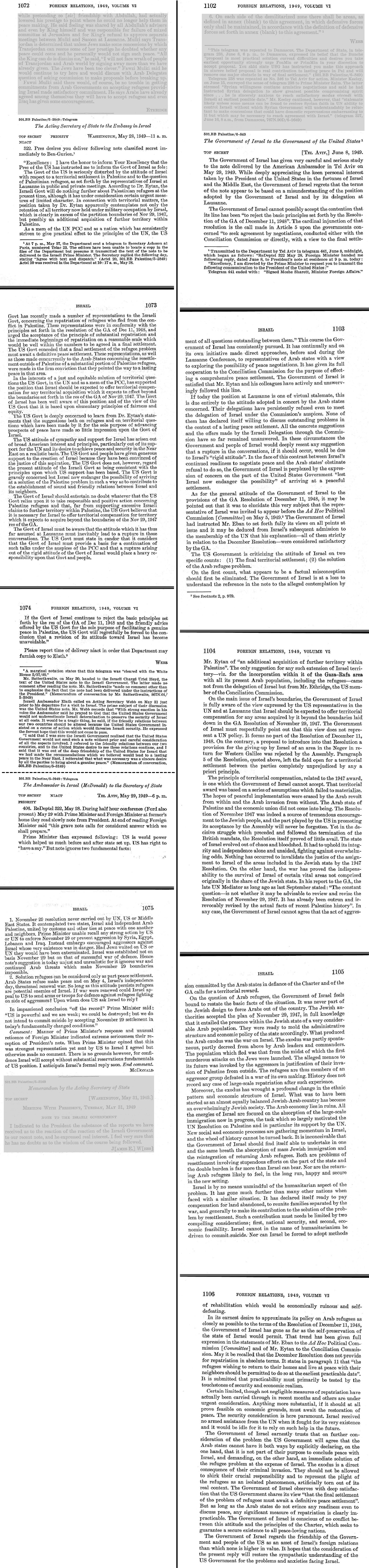
28 May memo from the US to Ben-Gurion and the Israeli reply of 8 June

The President sent on 28 May 1949 a note to Israeli Prime Minister David Ben-Gurion, expressing that he was "seriously disturbed" with the "excessive Israeli claims to further territory within Palestine" and its "rejection of the basic principles of the Resolution set forth by the GA on 11 December 1948". The U.S. position was that Israel should offer territorial compensation for any territory it had acquired outside the boundaries set forth in the UN resolution of 29 November 1947. The United States warned that the Israeli attitude thus far at Lausanne "must inevitably lead to a rupture in those conversations...and that a rupture arising out of the rigid attitude of the Government of Israel would place a heavy responsibility upon that Government and people". The United States warned for a revision of its relation with Israel.

When the U.S. ambassador the next day handed over the telegram to Ben-Gurion, the latter reacted by saying that the United States and UN had been unable to enforce 29 November resolution and to prevent the Arab aggression. He stated that Israel was not established on the basis of the resolution but on that of a successful war of defence. Because the Arab states refused to make peace, he regarded refugees as potential enemies of Israel.

==== Israel's reply to the United States ====
On 8 June, Israel replied to the 28 May note. It stated that the willingness of Israel to negotiate and its full cooperation with the Conciliation Commission proved that it did not reject the basic principles of Resolution 194. The stalemate was entirely due to the attitude of the Arab states.

Israel stated that its admission to UN membership, after setting forth Israel's views regarding the Resolution before the committee, meant that the UN considered them satisfactory; a contention the U.S. government strongly rejected.

According to Israel, it was not committed to the boundaries determined in the Partition Plan because of paragraph 5 of Resolution 194 which, also according to Israel, left the field open for a territorial settlement completely unprejudiced by any a priori principle.

The refugees were (thus) members of an aggressor group defeated in a war of its own making: "The exodus is a direct consequence of [the Arab state's] criminal invasion." It was inconceivable "to undertake in one and the same breath the absorption of mass Jewish immigration and the reintegration of returning Arab refugees".

== The negotiations ==
Boundaries defined in the 1947 UN Partition Plan for Palestine: Area assigned for a Jewish state Area assigned for an Arab state Planned Corpus separatum with the intention that Jerusalem would be neither Jewish nor Arab Armistice Demarcation Lines of 1949 (Green Line): Israel per 1949 armistice lines West Jerusalem and other areas under Israeli control from 1949 Gaza and the West Bank (including East Jerusalem) under Egyptian and Jordanian control till 1967

=== Borders ===
Israel's position on borders was that they should be based on the 1949 Armistice Line (the Green Line), with minor modifications, and "flatly refused to return to the line of the 1947 partition plan." Already on 20 May 1949, Israel proposed that the "political frontiers" between Israel and respectively Egypt, Lebanon and the Hashemite Jordan Kingdom should be the same as under the British Mandate, thus annexing Galilee and Gaza. Israel made clear to the Conciliation Commission, that she also wanted a slice of Southeastern Lebanon, necessary to her development scheme, but not yet demanded in favor of a quick peace. Residents and refugees of annexed Gaza (an area several times the size of the present Gaza Strip) who were hostile towards Israel should be deported. According to Israel, no Arab state had a right to any territory in Palestine. Israel had "of course" more demands as to territory, based upon its development scheme. Israel would not give up the occupied Negev, because she could develop it and the Arabs were not able to. Moreover, it was impossible to give it up because of "psychological reasons" and because it "would obviously be a concession to the British, not to the Arabs". Jaffa, Lydda and Ramle were simply to be kept. The latter had been filled up with immigrants and there was no place for Arabs.

The border between Israel and the "central area" (that is the West Bank) would be the 1949 Armistice Line, subject to certain modifications in the interests of both parties, thus with Israeli annexation of large areas along the present West Bank, including West Jerusalem. Israel declared that it had no ambitions as regards the central area of Palestine.

In a letter of 31 August 1949 to the Conciliation Commission, Israel demanded that all territories it had conquered in the 1948 Palestine war (some 60% of the areas allocated to the proposed Arab state) would become part of Israel, in addition to the territory already allocated in the Partition Plan. The Arabs on the other hand, insisted that any deal had to be resolved on the basis of the Partition Plan, with territorial adjustments necessary pursuant to the Lausanne Protocol. The United States expected territorial compensation for any territorial acquisition beyond the boundaries of the Partition Plan proposed in Resolution 181.

The Israelis wanted the construction of a water canal from north to south on Arab land. According to the delegation, it was essential for the canal to run entirely through Israeli territory. Only Jewish areas would benefit by it so that it held no common interest for both parties. Therefore, the territory, including Tulkarm, Qalqiliya and most of the villages of the coastal plain should be annexed by Israel. This would double the 1947-allotted Jewish area, aside from the Negev. Israel also wanted the entire western shore of the Dead Sea.

=== Jerusalem ===
The issue of Jerusalem was relegated to a subcommittee: the Committee on Jerusalem. While they had previously rejected the UN's internationalisation plan, most of the Arab delegations accepted a permanent international regime (called corpus separatum) under United Nations supervision as proposed in the Resolutions 181 and 194. Israel rejected this and instead preferred a division of Jerusalem into a Jewish and an Arab zone, and international control and protection only for Holy Places and sites.

During the conference, the Israeli government began moving its offices into West Jerusalem which angered the Arab states, who submitted a formal complaint to the commission with respect to the "administration and services which have been installed in this city in contempt of the resolution of 11th December 1948."

=== Refugees ===
At least half of the estimated 700,000 refugees originated from the areas allotted to "Arab Palestine" in the Partition Plan. First, the Arab states demanded the return of those refugees. In May and June 1949, the Israeli delegation expressed Israel's standpoint that Arab refugees should be settled in other states and Israel would not allow their return to Israel apart from a limited number. On 31 August, this view was repeated before the Conciliation Commission.

On 1 August, Israeli Minister of Foreign Affairs Moshe Sharett declared in the Knesset, that Israel considered itself not responsible in any way for the problem of the refugees. Israel's position on the refugees was that the Arab states were responsible for the Palestinian refugee problem since it was their aggression that caused the initial tragedy.

The Arab states' position was that the responsibility was Israel's and that the refugees should be allowed to choose between returning to their homes in territory Israel had occupied or receiving compensation. Transjordan was the first state willing to resettle refugees, provided they had also free choice to return to their homes.

==== The Gaza plan ====
When on 20 May Israeli delegate Walter Eytan put forward David Ben-Gurion's proposal to annex Egypt-controlled Gaza, Israel accepted all its inhabitants and refugees, some 230,000 refugees and 70,000 inhabitants, as citizens of Israel, provided the international community would pay for refugee resettlement. Israel threatened to abstain from offering proposals concerning the number of refugees it would accept in the event that the Gaza area were not incorporated into Israel. The Gaza annexation proposal, also called the "Gaza Plan", was done to "make a really constructive large-scale contribution to the refugee problem" according to a letter dated 29 May 1949 addressed by Walter Eytan, Head of the Delegation of Israel. Israel had, however, failed to stipulate under what conditions refugees could return and Egypt was afraid they would be dropped in the desert area of the Negev. The Gaza proposal became an important issue in the negotiations.

==== The "100,000 refugees offer" ====
While the negotiations were in an impasse, Israel was asked to "break the ice" by making a goodwill gesture. Israel then announced that it would pay compensation to refugees for their abandoned properties. The United States, however, persuaded Israel to accept at least a certain number of refugees. Israel was prepared to accept 100,000 refugees, contingent upon Arab agreement to a comprehensive peace and if its present (extended) territory remained the same. Sometimes this plan is referred to as "the 100,000 offer". After deduction of the already returned refugees, however, Israel's offer was in effect only some 80,000 refugees. Moreover, they were not allowed to return to their homes, but would be settled by Israel subject to its security and economic development plan. The Conciliation Commission considered the Israeli proposal as unsatisfactory. In return for repatriation of this limited number of refugees, Israel asked the annexation of all territories it had conquered until the 1949 Armistice Agreements, The total number of Arabs, including the non-refugees, were "for economic and security reasons" not to exceed 250,000, meaning that it would not be possible to maintain the 100,000 offer in combination with the Gaza Plan.

=== Other issues ===
Besides the delegations representing Israel and the Arab states, there were three delegations representing the refugees. Included were members of the General Refugee Congress that had been formed in Ramallah in March 1949. Other notable representatives were members of the Jaffa and District Inhabitants Committee.

While the main issue discussed at Lausanne was the fate of the refugees, also some of the issues relating to refugee property were discussed. The Israelis "explained the activities of the Custodian of Absentee Property". The discussion covered whether property issues could be addressed separately from the overall Arab–Israeli conflict, Israeli counter claims for war damages, the fate of the refugee orange groves, and the fate of refugee bank accounts blocked in Israel. Israel insisted on discussing the refugee and the property issue only as a part of the resolution of the entire conflict, while the Arabs insisted on dealing with the refugee issues separately, on their repatriation.

== Israel's admission as a UN member ==
In the month before the Lausanne Conference, the UN Security Council recommended the General Assembly to admit Israel as a member of the United Nations, deciding that Israel was a peace-loving state and was able and willing to carry out the obligations contained in the UN Charter, with Permanent Member Great Britain abstaining from voting. Israel was afraid that the discussions on borders and refugees would delay its admission and tried to persuade the Palestine Conciliation Commission to prevent debate on the issues in the UN pending the application procedure.

On 11 May, the day before Israel signed the Lausanne Protocol, the General Assembly approved Israel's admission, referring to the Resolutions 181 and 194. The resolution was adopted with 37 votes to 12. The admission was approved despite the quiet annexation of large parts of territory, which in the UN Partition Plan had been assigned to the Arab state, including the ports of Haifa and Jaffa, Galilee, and the areas around the West Bank, including West Jerusalem.

The UN hoped that Israel as member would abide the Charter and the Resolutions 181 and 194, thus helping foster peace in the Middle East. On 26 April 1949, Israeli president Weizmann had written to U.S. president Truman: "No single act, in my judgment, will contribute so much to pacification of the Middle East, as the speedy admission of Israel to the United Nations". The admission should also counter the denial by Arab countries of the existence of Israel.

Less than a half-year earlier, a similar application had been denied. That application was passed over by the adoption of General Assembly Resolution 194, which created the Conciliation Commission. The Security Council was divided about whether or not admission would benefit the negotiations on Palestine and also about the borders, defined in the Partition Plan, but not accepted by Israel.

Israel contended that its admission to the UN implied that the international community had agreed with Israel's attitude regarding Resolution 194, an argument the US government strongly rejected.

== Comments by Israeli "New Historians" ==
– According to Fishbach, Israel emerged from Lausanne frustrated with the role played by the UNCCP. Israel formally notified the UNCCP in the fall of 1949 that it felt its role should not be one of initiating proposals, but rather mediating between the Arabs and Israel who would respond directly to one another's initiatives. For the Arabs, movement on the refugee issue remained the sine qua non of any wider discussion with the Israelis and so they too came away disappointed from Lausanne.

– According to Benny Morris, the "Arab delegations arrived united in the demand that Israel declare acceptance of the principle of repatriation before they would agree to negotiate peace". Morris quotes Israeli delegate Dr. Walter Eytan as saying the Israeli delegation had "come prepared to tackle [the refugee problem] with sincerity and above all in the spirit of realism.', where, according to Morris, 'Realism' meant no repatriation." Morris adds that "The insufficiency of the '100,000 Offer,' the Arab states' continuing rejectionism, their unwillingness to accept and concede defeat and their inability to publicly agree to absorb and resettle most of the refugees if Israel agreed to repatriate the rest, the Egyptian rejection of the 'Gaza Plan,' and America's unwillingness to apply persuasive pressure on Israel and the Arab states to compromise—all meant that the Arab–Israeli impasse would remain and that Palestine's displaced Arabs would remain refugees, to be utilized during the following years by the Arab states as a powerful political and propaganda tool against Israel."

– According to Avi Shlaim, "I accept that in the period 1947–49 Israel had no Palestinian option or any other Arab option, save the Jordanian option. King Abdullah was the only Arab head of state who was willing to accept the principle of partition and to co-exist peacefully with a Jewish state after the dust had settled."

– Ilan Pappe writes: On 12 May 1949, the conference achieved its only success when the parties signed the Lausanne Protocol on the framework for a comprehensive peace, which included territories, refugees, and Jerusalem. Israel agreed in principle to allow the return of a number of Palestinian refugees. This Israeli agreement was made under pressure from the United States, and because the Israelis wanted United Nations membership, which required the settlement of the refugee problem. Once Israel was admitted to the UN, it retreated from the protocol it had signed, because it was completely satisfied with the status quo, and saw no need to make any concessions with regard to the refugees or on boundary questions. Israeli Foreign Minister Moshe Sharett had hoped for a comprehensive peace settlement at Lausanne, but he was no match for Prime Minister David Ben-Gurion, who saw the armistice agreements that stopped the fighting with the Arab states as sufficient, and put a low priority on a permanent peace treaty.

Among the Arabs, only King Abdullah of Transjordan (today's Jordan) worked for a permanent peace treaty with Israel, in part because he had annexed the West Bank and wanted the Israelis to recognize this. When Abdullah's secret negotiations and agreements with Israel were exposed, he was assassinated on 20 July 1951 in Jerusalem by a Palestinian. In the end, no agreement was reached. The failure to settle the refugee question led to the establishment of the United Nations Relief and Works Agency for Palestine Refugees in the Near East to care for the needs of refugees.

– According to Yagil Levy, the sides agreed on a protocol based on the Arabs' acceptance of the principle of partition in Palestine, implying recognition of Israel, and Israeli acceptance of the principle of the repatriation of the Palestinian refugees. Nevertheless, Israel, inspired by its newly defined security interests, signed the document but successfully impeded its translation into a political agreement (Levy, 1997, p. 60). The Israelis insisted on discussing solutions to refugee problems only in the context of an overall settlement of the Arab–Israeli conflict. This agreed with the commission's stance that the interrelation of all the aspects of the problem was too obvious to be overlooked." The Israeli government briefly offered to repatriate 100,000 refugees, but only as part of a final settlement in which all other refugees were absorbed by Arab states. Compensation would be paid, but not to individual refugees or Arab states, only to a "common fund" and only for land that had been under cultivation prior to being abandoned; not for any movable property or uncultivated land. The common fund would be reduced by an amount of compensation to Israel for war reparations. The commission found this proposal to be unsatisfactory and declared that

the Government of Israel is not prepared to implement the part of paragraph 11 of the General Assembly resolution of 11 December 1948 which resolves that the refugees wishing to return to their homes and live at peace with their neighbours should be permitted to do so at the earliest practicable date.

The Arab delegations insisted on dealing with the refugee problem separately from an overall settlement, and refused to deal directly with the Israeli delegation. The commission found that

The Arab Governments, on the other hand, are not prepared fully to implement paragraph 5 of the said resolution, which calls for the final settlement of all questions outstanding between them and Israel. The Arab Governments in their contacts with the Commission have evinced no readiness to arrive at such a peace settlement with the Government of Israel.

and that no constructive progress towards a solution of existing problems would be possible unless all the parties to the dispute, at the outset of the discussions, expressed their determination to respect each other's right to security and freedom from attack, to refrain from warlike or hostile acts against one another, and to promote the return of permanent peace in Palestine.

Overall, for reasons that were beyond the commission's task of facilitation, this movement did not come to pass. The respective attitudes of the parties on this matter—attitudes which produced a complete deadlock as regards the refugee question—are well known. The Arab States insisted upon a prior solution of the refugee question, at least in principle, before agreeing to discuss other outstanding issues. In their opinion, a solution of the refugee problem could be reached only as a result of unconditional acceptance by Israel of the right of refugees to be repatriated. Israel, on the other hand, has maintained that no solution of the refugee question involving repatriation could be envisaged outside the framework of an overall settlement.

== Bibliography ==
=== Primary Sources ===
- "Foreign relations of the United States, 1949. The Near East, South Asia, and Africa". Foreign Relations of the United States. US Department of State. pp. 594–1565.
- "Third Progress Report". United Nations Information System on the Question of Palestine. United Nations Conciliation Commission for Palestine. 21 June 1949.

=== Secondary Sources ===
- Caplan, Neil (2015) [1997]. Futile Diplomacy: The United Nations, the Great Powers, and Middle East Peacemaking 1948–1954. Vol. 3. Routledge. ISBN 9781138907546.
- —————— (1993). The Lausanne Conference, 1949: A Case Study in the Middle East Peacemaking. Moshe Dayan Center for Middle Eastern and African Studies. ISBN 9789652240132.
- —————— (1992). "A Tale of Two Cities: The Rhodes and Lausanne Conferences, 1949". Journal of Palestine Studies. 21 (3): 5–34. doi:10.2307/2537517. ISSN 0377-919X. JSTOR 2537517.
- Fischbach, Michael R (2003). Records of Dispossession: Palestinian Refugee Property and the Arab–Israeli Conflict (PDF). Indiana University Press. ISBN 9780231129787.
- Levy, Yagil (1997). Trial and Error: Israel's Route From War to De-escalation. State University of New York Press. ISBN 978-0-7914-3429-1.
- Morris, Benny (2004). The Birth of the Palestinian Refugee Problem Revisited. Cambridge University Press. ISBN 978-0-521-00967-6.
- Schulz, Helena Lindholm; Hammer, Juliane (2003). The Palestinian Diaspora: Formation of Identities and Politics of Homeland (PDF). Routledge. ISBN 978-0-415-26820-2.
- Tessler, Mark (2009) [1994]. A History of the Israeli-Palestinian Conflict (2nd ed.). Indiana University Press. ISBN 978-0-253-01346-0.
- Pappé, Ilan (1992). The Making of the Arab-Israeli Conflict, 1947-1951. I.B.Tauris. ISBN 9781850433576.
