= Yagil Levy =

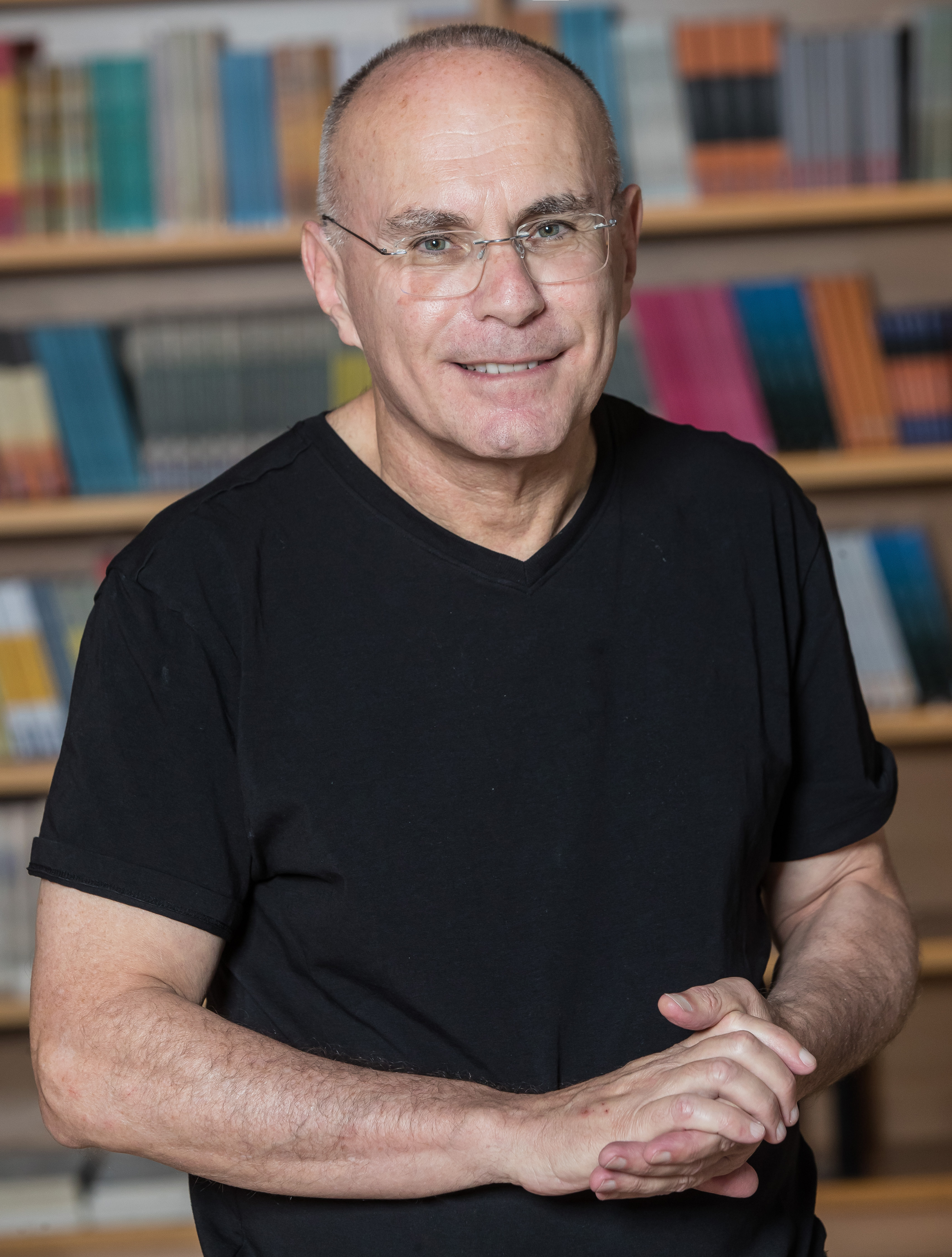

Yagil Levy is an Israeli military sociologist and political scientist who studies the theoretical and empirical aspects of relations between society and the military. Levy is a professor of political sociology and public policy at the Open University of Israel and the Head of the Open University Institute for the Study of Civil-Military Relations.

== Background ==
Levy was born in Tel Aviv. From 1976 to 1988, he served in the Israel Defense Forces (IDF) in a policymaking capacity, rising to the rank of Lieutenant Colonel. During his time in the IDF, he earned his B.A. in Political Science, and in 1993, after his release, his Ph.D. in Political Science, both from Tel Aviv University. His dissertation, “The Role of the Military Sphere in the Construction of the Social‑Political Order in Israel”, examined how military institutions influenced the development of Israeli statehood and political dynamics.

== Career ==
Levy began his academic career as an Adjunct faculty member at Tel Aviv University and later served as a visiting scholar at the New School for Social Research in New York. In 2008, he joined the Open University of Israel as an Associate Professor and was promoted to Full Professor in 2013.

While at the Open University of Israel, Levy founded the MA program in Government and Public Policy and the Local Government School. Over the course of his career, he authored nine books (four in English), one co-authored book, one textbook, and ten edited volumes and special issues, and published over 100 academic articles and chapters in journals, including Armed Forces & Society, European Journal of International Relations, Gender & Society, Public Administration Review, International Studies Quarterly, Security Dialogue, Security Studies and Theory & Society.

Levy is a regular contributor to the Israeli newspaper Ha'aretz. He's been a reviewer for over thirty academic journals in English and Hebrew and is an editorial board member for the journal Armed Forces & Society. From 2014 to 2016, he was the Co-Editor of Megamot- The Interdisciplinary Journal of Social Sciences (in Hebrew).

Between 2013 and 2015, Levy was the president of the European Research Group on Military and Society (ERGOMAS), and served as Vice President of the Israeli Sociological Society (2018–2019). He is a council member of the Inter-University Seminar on Armed Forces and Society (IUS).

== Research ==
Levy’s research focuses on civil-military relations, particularly the impact of the social structure on the military, casualty sensitivity, civilian control, military-religious relations, the social makeup of the armed forces, the legitimacy of using force, and militarization.

He is among a group of scholars worldwide who have pioneered critical perspectives within military sociology. This approach has challenged conventional wisdom, exposed power dynamics, and opened new avenues of research that shed light on the social costs of militarization.

His article "Militarizing Inequality: A Conceptual Framework," laid the foundations for a conceptual framework the military's role in reproducing social inequalities. His book Whose Life Is Worth More? Hierarchies of Risk and Death in Contemporary Wars (Stanford University press) examined how states manage life and death by developing a death hierarchy, an ordered scale of value that they apply to the lives of their soldiers relative to the lives of their civilians and enemy noncombatants.

His article “What is Controlled by Civilian Control of the Military? Control of the Military vs. Control of Militarization,” offers a revised conceptualization of civilian control that explores civilian control of the military and civilian control of militarization. His work on military-religious relations touches on the descularization of the U.S. and Israeli militaries. His articles address the conditions under which the desecularization of militaries takes place, and how such religiosity affects the armed forces.

== Awards ==
In 2012, he won the Association for Israel Studies' Shapiro Award for the Best Book in Israel Studies for his book Israel’s Death Hierarchy: Casualty Aversion in a Militarized Democracy.

In 2021, the Inter-University Seminar on Armed Forces and Society (IUS) recognized his impact and career, awarding him the Morris Janowitz Career Achievement Award. The award is presented to a few senior scholars whose careers demonstrate excellence in the study of armed forces and society. In 2023, the Israeli Political Science Association awarded him the Recognition Award for Civic and Community Involvement.

== Notable Publications ==
- Levy, Yagil. Trial and Error : Israel’s Route from War to de-Escalation. Albany: State University of New York Press, 1997
- Levy, Yagil. Israel’s Materialist Militarism. Lexington Books, 2007.
- Levy, Yagil. “Militarizing Inequality: A Conceptual Framework.” Theory and Society 27, no. 6 (1998): 873–904. https://doi.org/10.1023/A:1006962331533.
- Levy, Yagil. Israel’s Death Hierarchy : Casualty Aversion in a Militarized Democracy. New York: New York University Press, 2012.
- Levy, Yagil. “What Is Controlled by Civilian Control of the Military? Control of the Military vs. Control of Militarization.” Armed Forces and Society 42, no. 1 (2016): 75–98. https://doi.org/10.1177/0095327X14567918.
- Levy, Yagil, Edna Lomsky-Feder, and Noa Harel. “From ‘Obligatory Militarism’ to ‘Contractual Militarism’—Competing Models of Citizenship.” Israel Studies (Bloomington, Ind.) 12, no. 1 (2007): 127–48. https://doi.org/10.1353/is.2007.0004.
- Levy, Yagil. “The Theocratization of the Israeli Military.” Armed Forces and Society 40, no. 2 (2014): 269–94. https://doi.org/10.1177/0095327X12466071.
- Sasson-Levy, Orna, Yagil Levy, and Edna Lomsky-Feder. “WOMEN BREAKING THE SILENCE: MILITARY SERVICE, GENDER, AND ANTIWAR PROTEST.” Gender & Society 25, no. 6 (2011): 740–63. https://doi.org/10.1177/0891243211421782.
- Levy, Yagil. What Is the Social Responsibility of Social Scientists to Influence National Security Affairs? Armed Forces & Society, 49(1), 7-19. https://doi-org.lib-e2.lib.ttu.edu/10.1177/0095327X20917183 (Original work published 2023)
- Levy, Yagil. Levy, Yagil. Whose Life Is Worth More? Hierarchies of Risk and Death in Contemporary Wars. Stanford: Stanford University Press, 2019.
- Levy, Yagil. Theorizing Desecularization of the Military: The United States and Israel. Armed Forces & Society, 46(1), 92-115. https://doi-org.lib-e2.lib.ttu.edu/10.1177/0095327X18806516 (Original work published 2020)
