= Ruth Lapidoth =

- רות לפידות

Legal adviser for the Israeli Ministry of Foreign Affairs
- In office 1979–1981
- Preceded by: Meir Rosenne
- Succeeded by: Elyakim Rubinstein

Professor Ruth Lapidoth (Hebrew: רות לפידות; born October 27, 1930) is a Senior Researcher at the Jerusalem Institute for Israel Studies and Professor Emeritus of International Law at the Hebrew University of Jerusalem. She is a recipient of the 2006 Israel Prize in Legal Studies and of the 2000 Prominent Woman in International Law Award from the WILIG group of the American Society of International Law.

Lapidoth served as a Legal Advisor to the Ministry of Foreign Affairs in 1979-1981, has been a guest lecturer and researcher at several leading academic institutions, including Oxford University, Georgetown University and the American Institute for Peace, and is the author of nine books and more than ninety articles dealing with international law, human rights, the Arab–Israeli conflict, and Jerusalem.

Lapidoth serves as a member of the Advisory Board of the Israel Council on Foreign Relations.
