= United Nations General Assembly Resolution 3236 (XXIX) =

UN General Assembly Resolution 3236 (XXIX)
- Date: November 22, 1974
- Meeting no.: 2282
- Code: A/RES/3236 (XXIX) (Document)
- Subject: Question of Palestine
- Voting summary: 89 voted for; 8 voted against; 37 abstained
- Result: Approved

United Nations General Assembly Resolution 3236, adopted by the 29th Session of the General Assembly on November 22, 1974, recognizes the Palestinian people's right to self-determination, officializes United Nations contact with the Palestine Liberation Organization, and adds the "Question of Palestine" to the U.N. Agenda.

== Full text ==
3236 (XXIX). Question of Palestine

The General Assembly,

Having considered the question of Palestine,

Having heard the statement of the Palestine Liberation Organization, the representative of the Palestinian people,(*)

Having also heard other statements made during the debate,

Deeply concerned that no just solution to the problem of Palestine has yet been achieved and recognizing that the problem of Palestine continues to endanger international peace and security,

Recognizing that the Palestinian people is entitled to self-determination in accordance with the Charter of the United Nations,

Expressing its grave concern that the Palestinian people has been prevented from enjoying its inalienable rights, in particular its right to self-determination,

Guided by the purposes and principles of the Charter,

Recalling its relevant resolutions which affirm the right of the Palestinian people to self-determination,

1. Reaffirms the inalienable rights of the Palestinian people in Palestine, including:
  1. (a) The right to self-determination without external interference;
  2. (b) The right to national independence and sovereignty;
2. Reaffirms also the inalienable right of the Palestinians to return to their homes and property from which they have been displaced and uprooted, and calls for their return;
3. Emphasizes that full respect for and the realization of these inalienable rights of the Palestinian people are indispensable for the solution of the question of Palestine;
4. Recognizes that the Palestinian people is a principal party in the establishment of a just and lasting peace in the Middle East;
5. Further recognizes the right of the Palestinian people to regain its rights by all means in accordance with the purposes and principles of the Charter of the United Nations;
6. Appeals to all States and international organizations to extend their support to the Palestinian people in its struggle to restore its rights, in accordance with the Charter;
7. Requests the Secretary-General to establish contacts with the Palestine Liberation Organization on all matters concerning the question of Palestine;
8. Requests the Secretary-General to report to the General Assembly at its thirtieth session on the implementation of the present resolution;
9. Decides to include the item entitled "Question of Palestine" in the provisional agenda of its thirtieth session.
- Official Records of the General Assembly, Twenty-ninth Session, Plenary Meetings, 2282nd meeting, para. 3-83.

== Voting results ==
The result of the voting was the following:

Approve: Afghanistan, Albania, Algeria, Argentina, Bahrain, Bangladesh, Bhutan, Botswana, Bulgaria, Burma, Burundi, Byelorussian SSR, Cameroon, Central African Republic, Chad, China, Congo, Cuba, Cyprus, Czechoslovakia, Dahomey, South Yemen, Egypt, Equatorial Guinea, Ethiopia, Gabon, Gambia, East Germany, Ghana, Guinea, Guinea-Bissau, Guyana, Hungary, India, Indonesia, Iran, Iraq, Ivory Coast, Jamaica, Jordan, Kenya, Khmer Republic, Kuwait, Lebanon, Lesotho, Liberia, Libya, Madagascar, Malaysia, Mali, Malta, Mauritania, Mauritius, Mongolia, Morocco, Niger, Nigeria, Oman, Pakistan, Peru, Philippines, Poland, Portugal, Qatar, Romania, Rwanda, Saudi Arabia, Senegal, Sierra Leone, Somalia, Spain, Sri Lanka, Sudan, Syria, Thailand, Togo, Trinidad and Tobago, Tunisia, Turkey, Uganda, Ukrainian SSR, Soviet Union, United Arab Emirates, Tanzania, Upper Volta, Yemen Arab Republic, Yugoslavia, Zaire, Zambia

Reject: Bolivia, Chile, Costa Rica, Iceland, Israel, Nicaragua, Norway, United States

Abstentions: Australia, Austria, Bahamas, Barbados, Belgium, Canada, Colombia, Denmark, Ecuador, El Salvador, Fiji, Finland, France, West Germany, Greece, Grenada, Guatemala, Haiti, Honduras, Republic of Ireland, Italy, Japan, Laos, Luxembourg, Malawi, Mexico, Nepal, Netherlands, New Zealand, Panama, Paraguay, SingaporeSwaziland, Sweden, United Kingdom, Uruguay, Venezuela,

== See also ==
- List of the UN resolutions concerning Palestine
- UN Security Council Resolution 242
