= Palestine exception =

Restrictions on pro-Palestine speech

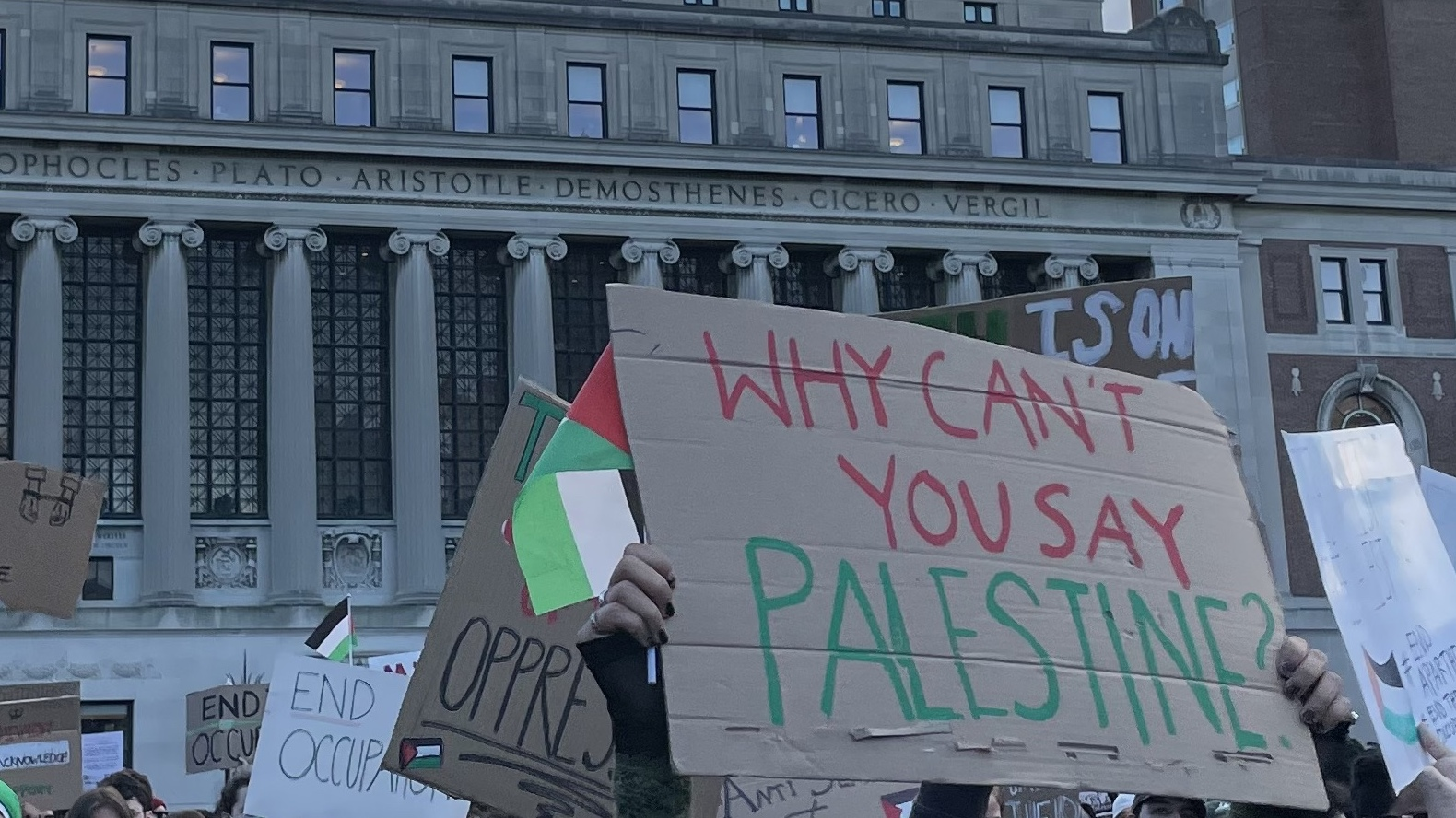
A sign that reads "Why can't you say Palestine?" at a protest at Columbia University, 12 October 2023

The Palestine exception, otherwise known as the Palestine exception to free speech, is a pattern of institutional discrimination and selective enforcement of policies and laws that restricts the voices, scholarship, and advocacy of Palestinians and their allies, contrary to principles such as freedom of expression, academic freedom, or the right to protest. Especially since the onset of the Gaza war, academics, lawyers, free speech advocates, civil liberties advocates, journalists, and pro-Palestinian activists have raised concerns about censorship and suppression of protests against the war, calls for a ceasefire, criticism of US military and diplomatic support for Israel, and criticism of Israel's invasion of Gaza and its military conduct there. The term has also regularly been used to criticize university policies that restrict pro-Palestine campus protests, including those that call for disinvestment from Israel.

Steven Salaita suggests that, beyond Palestinians themselves, suppression of pro-Palestinian discourse particularly affects Arabs, Muslims and ethnic minorities. Jairo I. Fúnez-Flores says that many pro-Palestinian advocacy groups have changed social media platforms in order to evade what they claim is institutional censorship or punishment for their pro-Palestinian comments, and that calls for suppression have been amplified by traditional media. United Nations Special Rapporteur for freedom of speech Irene Khan has recognized the discrimination and double standards that protests for the Palestinian cause have faced in Europe and the United States, which include bans on, and even criminalization of, public displays of Palestinian flags and the keffiyeh.

== Description ==
In 2015, Palestine Legal published an extensive report with the Center for Constitutional Rights about what the two organizations described as "the Palestine exception to free speech", and began to run a news section dedicated to documenting and analyzing instances of the Palestinian exception on educational institutions (especially university campuses), media coverage, and protest crackdowns.

The "Palestinian exception" is described by pro-Palestinian activists and scholars as a documented pattern of institutional discrimination and selective enforcement of policies that are stated to specifically target and restrict Palestinian voices, scholarship, and advocacy in Western academic and media institutions. This phenomenon, used particularly to describe events in North America and Europe, manifests through what are described as systematic attempts to silence Palestinian narratives and critical discussions of Israeli policies towards Palestinian Territories, while disproportionately emphasizing platforms for opposing viewpoints.

Institutional mechanisms described by pro-Palestinian advocates that enforce the Palestine exception include the adoption of specific definitions of antisemitism that encompass criticism of Israeli state policies, the implementation of restrictive speech or dialogue policies in educational institutions, the elective application of "balance" requirements in media coverage, and external pressure from pro-Israeli advocacy groups such as AIPAC, the Centre for Israel and Jewish Affairs, and the Women's International Zionist Organization.

In academia, restrictions are described as selective enforcement of academic freedom principles, pressure on institutions to cancel events or withdraw speaking invitations regarding Palestinian issues, complications in hiring and tenure processes for scholars working on Palestinian issues, and the implementation of policies that specifically restrict criticism of Israeli state policies. The phenomenon has also been claimed to extend into primary and secondary education systems, such as with the Toronto District School Board's allowance of pro-Israel lobbyists such as the Centre for Israel and Jewish to directly shape class curriculum.

== Instances ==
=== Academic censorship ===
In 2020, the University of Toronto Faculty of Law initially withdrew an employment offer to scholar Valentina Azarova following external pressure from a donor related to their work on Palestinian human rights. The rescinding of the offer led to widespread academic protest and boycotts headed by the Canadian Association of University Teachers (CAUT), eventually leading to the university re-offering employment to Azarova, who declined.

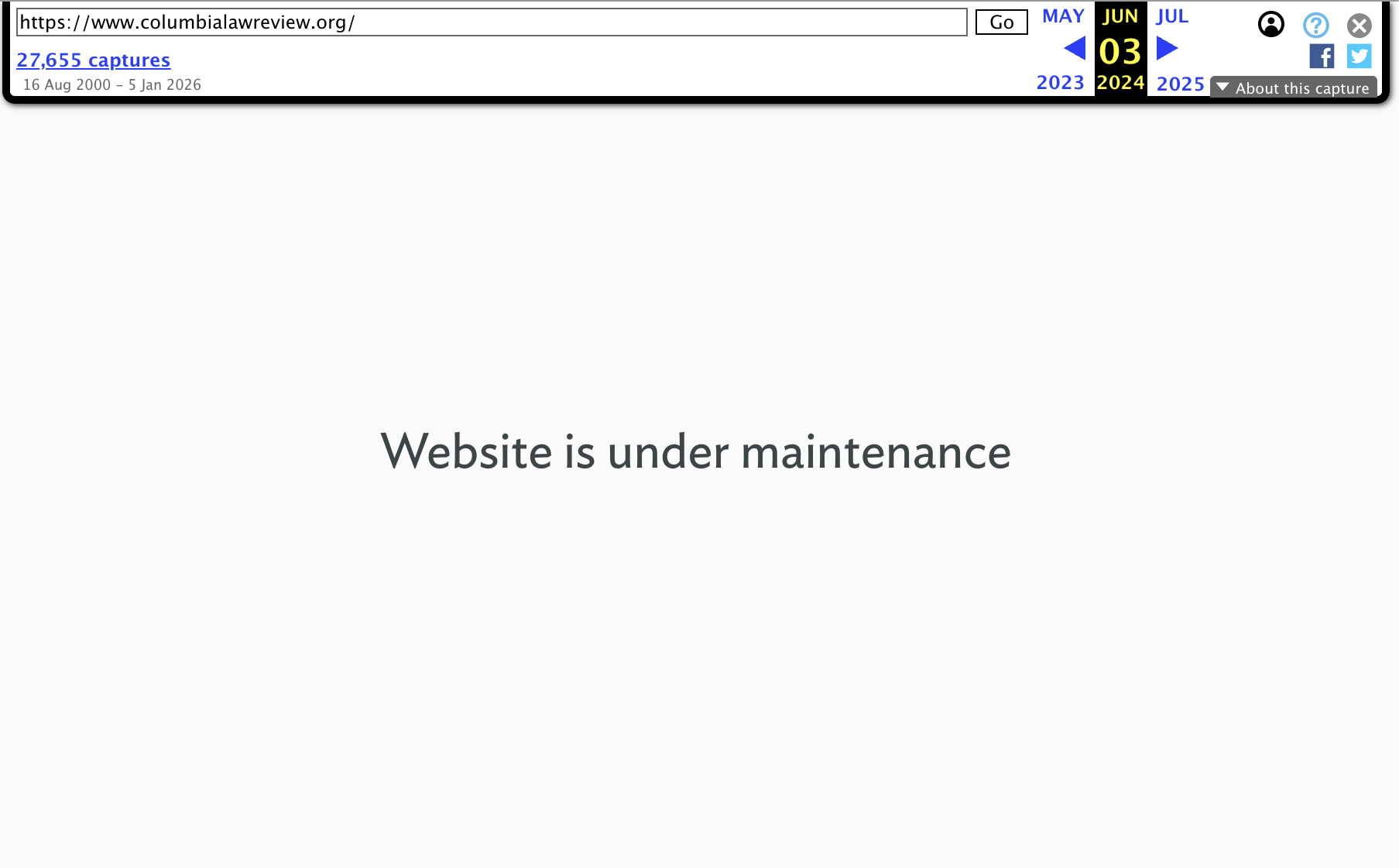
The board of directors of the Columbia Law Review took down its entire website hours after its publication of Toward Nakba as a Legal Concept by Rabea Eghbariah. The website was reinstated after a 20-5 majority of staff editors voted to strike.

The term was also used by a Harvard Law Review editor to describe the retraction of an essay by Palestinian human rights lawyer and legal scholar Rabea Eghbariah discussing the use of "Nakba" as a legal term, following an intervention by Harvard Law Review president Apsara Iyer. Eghbariah used the term himself to describe the censorship of Toward Nakba as a Legal Concept, an expanded version of the HLR essay published in the Columbia Law Review.

=== Media ===
Many pro-Palestinian activists cite western media coverage as demonstrating patterns of the Palestinian exception. Notable examples include different news networks' policies restricting the use of the term "Palestine", such as with the Canadian Broadcasting Corporation (CBC) and The New York Times. In one incident, CBC Current guest anchor Duncan McCue was required to issue a public apology for referring to Palestine during an interview. Social media platforms such as Meta Platforms's Facebook and Instagram were also noted to systemically censor or de-weight the use of terms relating to Palestine and the ongoing conflict.

FAIR provided two examples from May 2025. In the first instance, it contrasted the New York Times's high-profile coverage of Greta Thunberg's climate justice activism with its silence about her presence aboard the June 2025 Gaza Freedom Flotilla, which was aiming "to bring in some aid and raise 'international awareness' over the ongoing humanitarian crisis". In the second instance, FAIR mentioned that an op-ed by the New York Times's publisher, A.G. Sulzberger, "decried attacks on the freedom of the press around the world, but omitted that the biggest killer of journalists in the world today is the Israeli government".

=== University campus protests ===
Since the onset of the Gaza war, "Palestine exception" was frequently used to describe documented patterns of disproportionate institutional reactions to pro-Palestinian protests compared to other social justice movements on university campuses. Pro-Palestinian protesters and their allies have criticized the disposition of many university administrations as perpetuating a "Palestine exception" to academic freedom. Pro-Palestinian students and their allies have raised concerns about anti-Palestinianism and Islamophobia. Investigations by the U.S. Department of Education have been opened at Columbia, Emory University, the University of North Carolina, and at Umass Amherst over their administrations' response to student protests and advocacy since the start of the war.

A comparative analysis of different Harvard University approaches to student protests noted that the administration held measured responses to anti-Apartheid encampments in 1986, Occupy Movement encampments and access restrictions in 2011, and environmental activist blockades in 2015 with minimal punishments for students involved. In contrast to prior temporary disruptions, pro-Palestinian encampments on Harvard campus faced threats of mass suspensions, stricter enforcement of rules and restrictions, and what was described as a shift away from dialogue and protest as part of academic discourse, necessary to protect academic freedom.

Several pro-Palestinian advocates have also described the Harvard administration as implementing the Palestine exception for preventing thirteen undergraduates from collecting their diplomas at the annual commencement ceremony as a consequence for participation in pro-Palestinian protests. Nearly 500 Harvard faculty and students criticized the sanctions as disproportionate, unprecedented, and designed to stifle open discourse, while others identified it as an example of the "Palestine exception" to free speech.

The case of Mahmoud Khalil—a negotiator on behalf of the Gaza Solidarity Encampment while a student at Columbia University, whom the Trump administration has detained and sought to deport—has been discussed as an example of the Palestine exception.

=== Graduation speeches ===
In several US universities, graduation speakers have either been condemned or had their invitations to speak rescinded as a result of anti-Israel or pro-Palestinian views.

== Title VI ==
The 2015 Palestine Legal report The Palestine Exception to Free Speech included complaints based on Title VI of the Civil Rights Act of 1964 as one of nine components in the "widespread and growing suppression of Palestinian human rights advocacy," recorded in about 250 such instances. In his 2024 article "Efforts to Weaponize Title VI against Pro-Palestine Speech on University Campuses," Jason Brownlee writes that Title VI, reinterpreted by Kenneth L. Marcus in 2004, has been a "background pretext" during the Gaza war protests for universities' policing of events and protests as well as disciplinary action against students.

== Responses ==
Besides affecting Palestinians themselves, Steven Salaita suggests that suppression of pro-Palestinian discourse also particularly affects Arabs, Muslims and ethnic minorities. He says that individuals initially investigated for pro-Palestinian or anti-Israeli speech have been subsequently prosecuted on politically motivated charges.

According to Jairo I. Fúnez-Flores, many pro-Palestinian advocacy groups have shifted to less restrictive social media platforms such as X (formerly Twitter) in order to evade censorship or punishment when speaking about the Gaza war and the resulting humanitarian crisis. Several groups have also used social media or instant messaging platforms to organize protests, media campaigns, and other activities without direct oversight. Fúnez-Flores says these shifts occurred in response to claims that traditional media coverage often amplified institutional justifications for restricting speech, while giving less attention to faculty and student perspectives. A film documenting the Palestine exception in academia and during pro-Palestinian protests on university campuses was produced and screened at several universities.

=== Criticism of the concept ===
In a 2018 review essay, Louisiana State University professor Mark Wagner disputed claims that pro-Israel groups systematically suppress academic freedom by targeting anti-Zionist scholars. He argued that the books he reviewed relied on anecdotal or exaggerated cases and often treated ordinary academic disputes as evidence of censorship. Wagner also criticized the portrayal of anti-Zionist academics as victims of repression and argued that it reinforced a postcolonial interpretation of the Israeli–Palestinian conflict.

== See also ==
- Anti-Palestinianism
- Israeli public diplomacy in the Gaza war
- Media coverage of the Israeli–Palestinian conflict
- Progressive except Palestine
- Visa and deportation controversies in the second Trump administration
- Weaponization of antisemitism
