= Palestinian self-determination =

Aspirations for increased autonomy

Palestinian self-determination, also known as "Palestinianism", refers to aspirations by Palestinian nationalists for increased autonomy and sovereign independence as well as to the international right of self-determination applied to Palestine. Such goals are features of both the one-state solution and the two-state solution. In the two-state solution this usually denotes territorial integrity initiatives, such as resisting occupation in the West Bank, annexation efforts in East Jerusalem or freedom of movement along borders, as well as the preservation of important sites such as Al-Aqsa Mosque.

== Overview ==
Examples of modern Palestinian politicians who are proponents of Palestinian self-determination include Saeb Erekat. In the one-state solution, Palestinian self-determination usually takes the form of calls for Palestinian reunification. Some Palestinian proponents of self-determination, such as Edward Said, have drawn an analogy between Zionism and colonialism. Other proponents of Palestinian self-determination, such as Jamil Effarah, have drawn an analogy between the conditions in the Palestinian territories and the Bantustan land reserves in apartheid-era South Africa.

In "Toward Nakba as a Legal Concept," Palestinian human rights lawyer and legal scholar Rabea Eghbariah writes that the denial of Palestinian self-determination is the purpose of the ongoing Nakba.

== See also ==
- Palestinian right to resist
- Thawabit
- State of Palestine
- Palestinian right of return
- Gaza genocide
