= Anti-Palestinian racism =

Discrimination directed at the Palestinian people

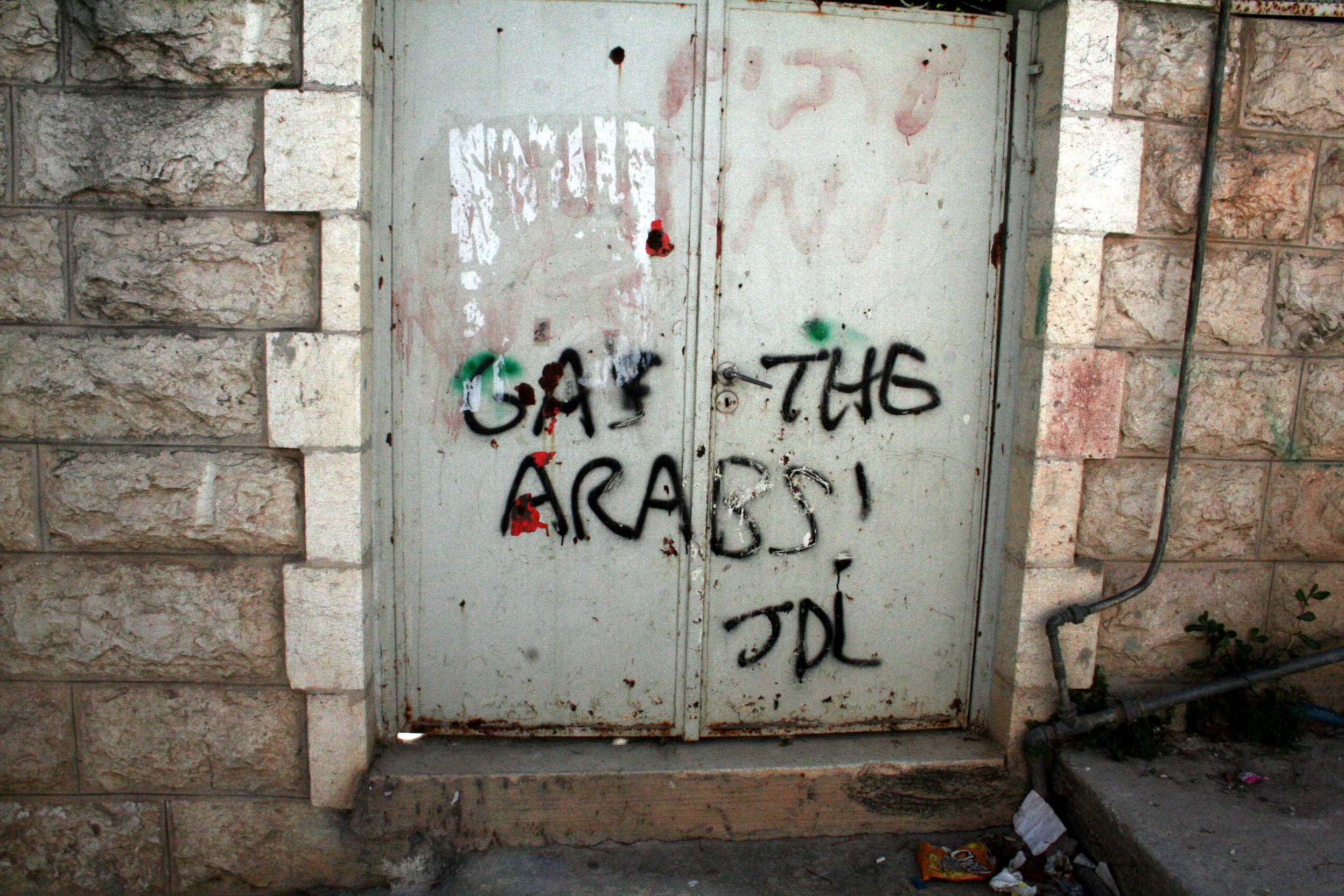
Anti-Palestinian graffiti reading "Gas the Arabs" and signed "JDL" (Jewish Defense League), spray-painted on the gate of a Palestinian home in Hebron.

Anti-Palestinian racism or anti-Palestinianism is prejudice, collective hatred, erasure, or discrimination directed at the Palestinian people. Since the mid-20th century, the phenomenon has largely overlapped with anti-Arab racism and Islamophobia because the majority of Palestinians are Arabs and Muslims (with a small but significant minority of Christians). Historically, anti-Palestinianism was more closely identified with European antisemitism, as far-right Europeans detested the Jewish people as undesirable foreigners from Palestine. Modern anti-Palestinianism—that is, xenophobia or racism towards Palestinians—is most common in Israel, (Note: "For much of the 20th century, mainstream American and Israeli public discourse did not even tolerate the word 'Palestinian.' In The Question of Palestine, published in 1979, Edward Said observed that, 'merely to mention the Palestinians or Palestine in Israel, or to a convinced Zionist, is to name the unnameable.' " (Beinart 2021)) the United States, Lebanon, Germany, and France, as well as in other European countries.

Anti-Palestinian racism includes "erasing the human rights and equal dignity and worth of Palestinians"; defending acts of violence against Palestinians; and refusing "to acknowledge Palestinians as an Indigenous people with a collective identity". Pakistani author and professor Sunaina Maira, citing American professor of Islamic studies Shahzad Bashir in the context of labelling, states: "...an important aspect of anti-Palestinianism, that is, the moral panic whipped up about the 'radicalization' of Muslim and Arab American youth is often accompanied by the charge that they are automatically anti-Semites if they are critical of the Israeli state's policies." According to Moustafa Bayoumi, anti-Palestinianism preceded the modern wave of Islamophobia and influenced its rise.

According to a United Nations special committee, Amnesty International, the International Association of Genocide Scholars, and other experts and human rights organisations, Israel has committed genocide against the Palestinian people during its ongoing invasion and bombing of the Gaza Strip. Anti-Palestinian racism has played a role in this genocide.

== Prevalence by country ==
=== Canada ===
In 2018, author and political activist Yves Engler criticized the New Democratic Party (NDP) for its conduct in respect of the Palestine Resolution that called for support of efforts to ban "settlement products from Canadian markets, and using other forms of diplomatic and economic pressure to end the [Israeli] occupation." Engler said it "demonstrated the need to directly confront anti-Palestinianism within the party." (Note: The 2021 NDP convention passed a resolution which made it official NDP policy to require "An end to Canada's support for illegal settlements" and "Suspending the flow of weapons to and from Israel until Palestinians are free")

In 2020, the University of Toronto allegedly blocked the hiring of Valentina Azarova as director of the International Human Rights Program (IHRP) due to her pro-Palestinian activism. Dania Majid, president of the Arab Canadian Lawyers Association (ACLA), described this as an example that "anti-Palestinian racism is alive and well" in Canada.

In 2023, the principal of Park West School in Halifax, Nova Scotia, apologized after Palestinian students were told they could not wear the keffiyeh during the school's culture day. Palestinian and pro-Palestinian activists protested the banning of the keffiyeh as an act of anti-Palestinian racism in front of the Department of Education building in Halifax.

In November 2024, HonestReporting Canada's assistant director, Robert Walker, was criminally charged with 17 counts of mischief for allegedly vandalizing several properties in a Toronto neighborhood by spray painting anti-Palestinian graffiti. The charges were withdrawn on March 5, 2025, in recognition of a $1,000 charitable donation by Walker to the Sick Kids Foundation.

=== France ===
In May 2021, the French interior minister Gérald Darmanin requested that the police ban a pro-Palestinian protest in Paris. The Parisian journalist Sihame Assbague described the decision as an expression of "French colonial solidarity with the Israeli occupation forces."

=== Germany ===
Palestinians in Germany have described a "crackdown and criminalisation" of Palestinians which has included police violence at protests, racial profiling, censorship, and violations of their human rights. Majed Abusalama, co-founder of Palestine Speaks in Germany, suggests German anti-Palestinianism is increasing.

In 2019, the Bundestag declared the Boycott, Divestment and Sanctions (BDS) movement to be a form of antisemitism. In response, the BDS movement condemned the motion as anti-Palestinian. The Palestinian B.D.S. National Committee issued a statement declaring the motion an "anti-Palestinian...McCarthyite and unconstitutional resolution passed by the German Parliament." British musician Brian Eno has argued that pro-Palestinian artists are subjected to "censorship and inquisitorial McCarthyism" due to the actions of the German government and anti-Palestinian groups.

On 27 April 2023, ahead of the 75th anniversary of Israel's independence, or for Palestinians the 75th anniversary of the Nakba, prominent German politician and president of the European Commission Ursula von der Leyen referred to Israel as a "vibrant democracy" in the Middle East that "made the desert bloom" in remarks criticized by the foreign ministry of the Palestinian Authority as a "propagandist discourse" propagating an "anti-Palestinian racist trope" and a "whitewashing" of Israeli occupation.

Germany's relationship with Palestine has been described as "complex". At present, Germany's political class exhibits a "zealous identification with Israel" that is "often explained in terms of the country's past". Alternative readings, however, view this trend as a "qualitatively new phenomenon in Germany largely unrelated to moral considerations pertaining to the Nazi era". Hannah C. Tzuberi argues that German manifestations of "anti-antisemitism" (which has been described as "a defining marker of post-war German identity") can go beyond the identification of Germans with Jews, sometimes leading to the identification of German gentiles as Jews, and the identification of Germany as Israel.

A 2024 study examined the influence of the 2009 proclamation of a German "reason of state" (Staatsräson) regarding Israel, on the perception of Palestinians. The authors documented a removal of Palestine-related content from educational curricula, a narrowing of the range of opinions, and the criminalization of Palestinian voices.

In 2020, scholars and artists began accusing Germany of a "witch hunt" against those who express pro-Palestinian solidarity. The European Legal Support Center (ELSC) has also accused Germany of human rights violations for laws which it says amount to suppression of pro-Palestinian activism, which it says particularly affects Jews and Palestinians. Artists for Palestine says Germany has censured a number of artists for expressing pro-Palestinian sentiment, include Kamila Shamsie, Kae Tempest, Young Fathers, Talib Kwelli, Walid Raad and Nirit Sommerfeld.

=== Israel ===
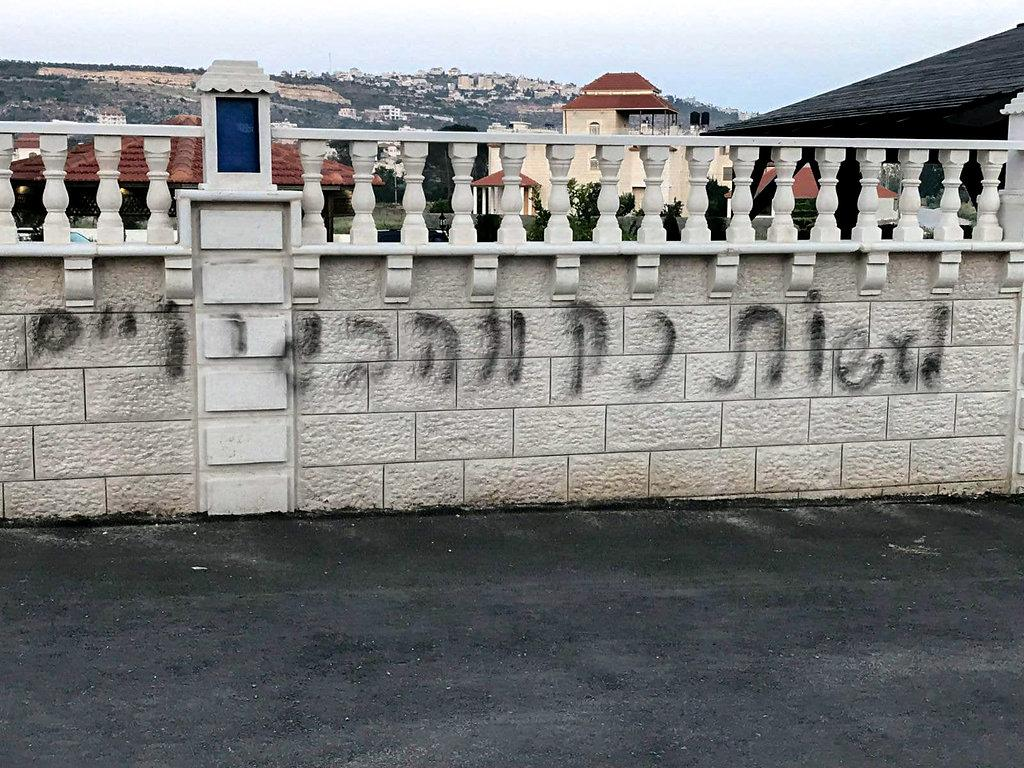
Graffito in Turmus Ayya, left by Israeli settlers: "Take revenge against the goyim."

Palestinians have been targets of Zionist political violence since before the establishment of the State of Israel during the 1948 Palestine war, remembered as the Nakba by Palestinians.

Palestinians are the target of violence by Israeli settlers and their supporters, predominantly in the West Bank. In November 2021, Israeli Defense Minister Benny Gantz discussed the steep rise in the number of incidents between settlers and Palestinians in the West Bank, many of which result from attacks by residents of illegal settler outposts on Palestinians from neighboring villages. Settler violence also includes acts known as price tag attacks that are in response to actions by the Israeli government, usually against Palestinian targets and occasionally against Israeli security forces in the West Bank.

Palestinian police are forbidden from reacting to acts of violence by Israeli settlers, a fact which diminishes their credibility among Palestinians. Between January and November 2008, 515 criminal suits were opened by Israel against settlers for violence against Arabs or Israeli security forces; 502 of these involved "right wing radicals" while 13 involved "left wing anarchists". In 2008, the senior Israeli commander in the West Bank said that a hard core of a few hundred activists were involved in violence against the Palestinians and Israeli soldiers. Some prominent Jewish religious figures living in the occupied territories, as well as Israeli government officials, have condemned and expressed outrage over such behavior, while religious justifications for settler killings have also been given. Israeli media said the defense establishment began taking a harder line against unruly settlers starting in 2008. In 2011 the BBC reported that "vast majority of settlers are non-violent but some within the Israeli government acknowledge a growing problem with extremists." UN figures from 2011 showed that 90% of complaints filed against settlers by Palestinians with the Israeli police never led to indictment.

In the 21st century, there has been a steady increase in violence and terror perpetrated by Israeli settlers against Palestinians. In 2012, an EU heads of mission report found that settler violence had more than tripled in the three years up to 2011. United Nations Office for the Coordination of Humanitarian Affairs (OCHA) figures state that the annual rate of settler attacks (2,100 attacks in 8 years) has almost quadrupled between 2006 and 2014. In 2021, there was yet another wave of settler violence which erupted after a 16-year-old settler died in a car chase with Israeli police after having hurled rocks at Palestinians. So far it has resulted in 44 incidents in the span of a few weeks, injuring two Palestinian children. In the latter parts of 2021, there has been a marked increase in settler violence toward Palestinians, condemned at the United Nations Security Council.

This violence increased further following the election of a far-right government in 2022 which proposed to expand Israeli settlements in Palestinian territories, as well as the October 7 attacks in 2023.

In 1994, a Jewish settler in the West Bank and follower of the Kach party, Baruch Goldstein, massacred 29 Palestinian Muslim worshipers at the Cave of the Patriarchs in Hebron. During his funeral, a rabbi declared that even one million Arabs are "not worth a Jewish fingernail". Goldstein was denounced by most religious streams including the mainstream Orthodox", and many in Israel classified Goldstein as insane. The Israeli government condemned the massacre and made Kach illegal. The Israeli army killed a further nine Palestinians during riots following the massacre, and the Israeli government severely restricted Palestinian freedom of movement in Hebron, while letting settlers roam free. Although Israel also forbade a very small number (18) of Israeli settlers from entering Palestinian towns and demanded that those settlers turn in their army-issued rifles, it denied the PLO's request that all settlers be disarmed and that an international force be established to protect Palestinians from Israeli aggressors. Goldstein's grave has become a pilgrimage site for Jewish extremists. Current Israeli Minister of National Security Itamar Ben-Gvir is known to have had a portrait of Goldstein hanging in his living room as homage.

In general, the Israeli occupation of Palestinian territories is hardly mentioned by Israeli textbooks or by high school matriculation examinations, according to a study by Professor Avner Ben-Amos of Tel Aviv University. The lives and perspectives of Palestinians are rarely mentioned, an approach he terms “interpretive denial.” In most Israeli textbooks, “the Jewish control and the Palestinians’ inferior status appear as a natural, self-evident situation that one doesn’t have to think about."

According to the Ben-Amos study, one of the main civics textbooks used in Israeli high schools fails to address at all the limited rights of the millions of Palestinians living in the West Bank under Israeli military occupation. The more general issue of the occupation was addressed in a previous edition of this textbook but the Israeli debate regarding the occupation was shrunk to a few sentences in the most recent edition under right-wing education ministers. Another Israeli civics textbook completely omits discussion of the dispute over the occupied territories. In civics high school matriculation tests over the past 20 years, no question appeared on the limiting of the Palestinians’ rights. The geography matriculation exams ignore the Green Line and the Palestinians.

=== Lebanon ===
Palestinian refugees in Lebanon are treated as second-class residents. Palestinians in Lebanon are denied citizenship, restricted from certain jobs, excluded from formal education, and forced to live in refugee camps. Anti-Palestinianism was a common sentiment in a number of Lebanese factions during the Lebanese Civil War; it was particularly prominent among Lebanese Christians fighting for the right-wing Lebanese Front against the Palestine Liberation Organization and various left-wing factions. Instances attesting this phenomenon include the Sabra and Shatila massacre, in which the Lebanese Forces massacred hundreds or thousands of Palestinians (along with Lebanese Shia Muslims) with support from the Israel Defense Forces in the city of Beirut.

=== United States ===
American public opinion has tended in favor of Israel and against Palestinians for a number of years, although pro-Palestinian sentiment has increased in the United States during the 21st century.

In 2021, according to Gallup, only 25% of Americans sympathized more with Palestinians than with Israelis, with 58% sympathizing with Israel, and only 34% of Americans believed that the United States should place more pressure on Israel in regards to the Israel-Palestine conflict. However, 52% of Americans supported an independent Palestinian state. Democrats were more likely than Republicans to have pro-Palestinian sentiments.

In her 1990 essay "Israel: Whose Country Is It Anyway?", the Jewish-American writer Andrea Dworkin wrote that American Jews are raised with anti-Palestinian sentiment, which she describes as "a deep and real prejudice against Palestinians that amounts to race-hate."

In May 2021, the Tayba Islamic Center in the Sheepshead Bay neighborhood of Brooklyn was vandalized with anti-Palestinian graffiti reading "Death 2 Palestine". The incident was investigated by the NYPD as a hate crime. Student leaders at the University of Michigan issued a statement denouncing the anti-Palestinian sentiment they alleged had been allowed to "run rampant" on campus, stating that Palestinian students had been "profoundly marginalized through censorship and threats."

In November 2021, Palestine Legal filed a complaint with Washington, D.C.'s Office for Human Rights against George Washington University, alleging that the university had discriminated against Palestinians in its offering of trauma services.

On 9 November 2023, a former leader of the University of Connecticut's pro-Palestine campus group, who had graduated in 2022, spoke out about threatening voicemails she had received, as her number was still publicly listed on the group's website. One particular voicemail she received was from a number in Oklahoma and contained racial slurs, called her a terrorist, and said "I can't wait to see you dead". The school's Muslim Student Association received an email mocking dead Palestinians, and the messages were reported to the FBI, campus and state police.

In the first presidential debate between Joe Biden and Donald Trump in June 2024, the latter reportedly used the word "Palestinian" as a slur.

== Examples ==
=== Erasure ===
Golda Meir's statement that "There was no such thing as Palestinians" is considered to be the most famous example of Israeli denial of a distinct Palestinian identity. In his law review article Toward Nakba as a Legal Concept, Rabea Eghbariah writes that "From Meir’s time to the present, Israeli politicians and other supporters of Zionism have repeatedly denied the existence of the Palestinians as a people."

The Zionist phrase "a land without a people for a people without a land" has also been employed toward the erasure of the indigenous Arab population of Palestine.

=== Narrative of Palestinian rejectionism ===
Narratives of Palestinian rejectionism with regard to Zionism have been widespread and consequential within Israel and among its supporters. Lorenzo Kamel writes that this narrative, which places the blame for the Israeli–Palestinian conflict on Palestinians and absolves Zionists and later Israelis, has remained "a common and even dominant conception in mainstream scholarly and political circles" despite having been "contested and on the whole disproved by critical scholars in the last three to four decades." Kamel cites iterations of such a narrative reproduced by figures including David Brog, Benny Morris, Lawrence J. Haas, Klaus-Michael Mallmann, Martin Cüppers, Philip Carl Salzman, Donna Robinson Divine, Efraim Karsh, Daniel Pipes, and Benjamin Netanyahu. Kamel writes that:

By twisting and omitting history, facts, and sources, and through the selective instrumentalization of figures such as Hajj Amin al-Husayni, the narrative of "Palestinian rejectionism" was used (and continues) to serve a political goal, shaping "the deep-seated intellectual frameworks that translate the fantasy of genocide into actual politics" and contributing to the "poetics of dehumanization" and the erasure of the Palestinians and their history.

=== Palestine exception ===
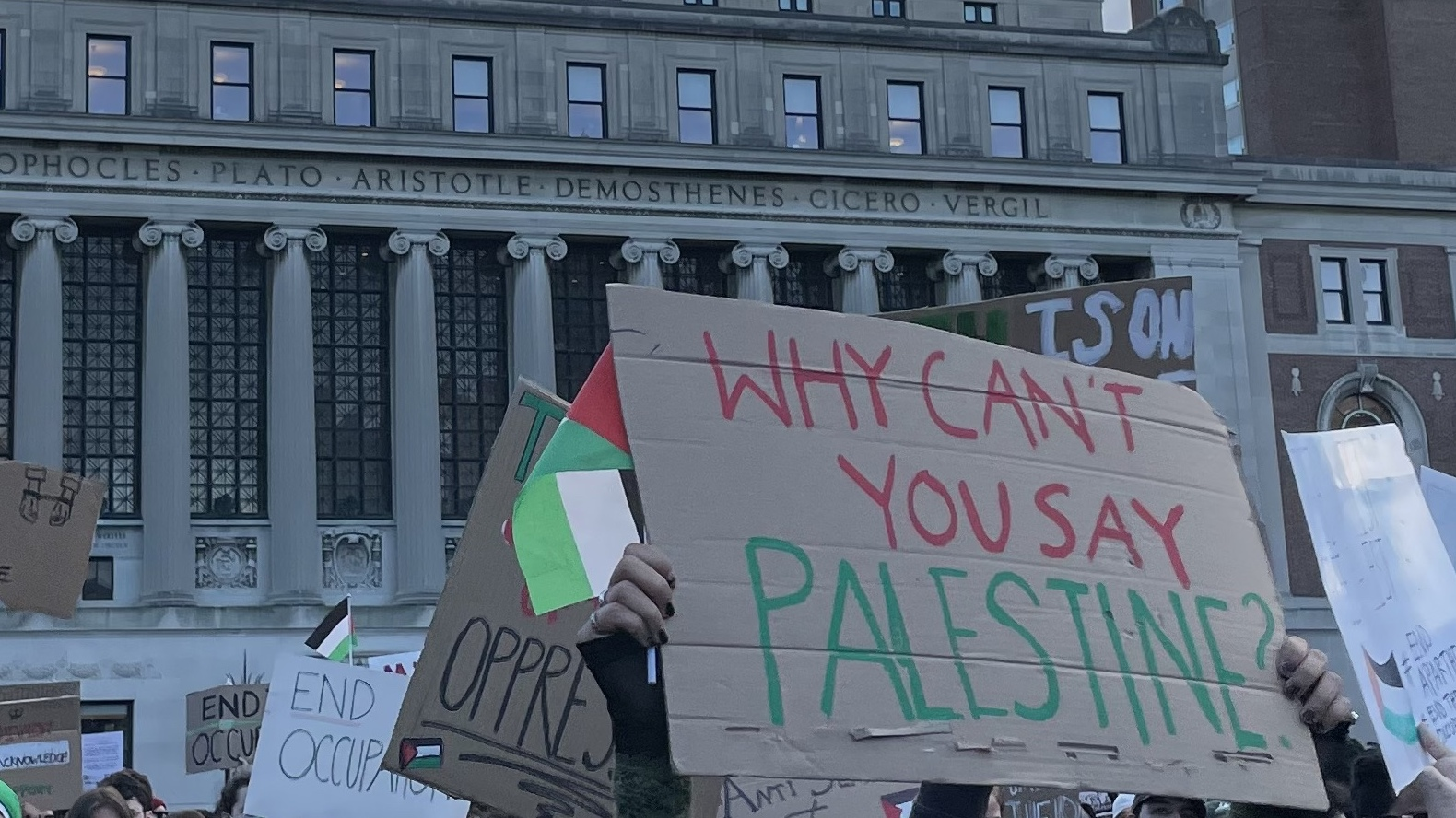
A sign reading "Why can't you say Palestine?" at a Palestine solidarity protest at Columbia University in 2023.

The phrases "Palestine exception" or "Palestine exception to free speech" have been used to refer to the pattern of institutional discrimination and selective enforcement of policies and laws that restricts the voices, scholarship, and advocacy of Palestinians and their allies, contrary to principles such as freedom of expression, academic freedom, or the right to protest. Especially since the onset of the Gaza war, academics, lawyers, free speech and civil liberties advocates, journalists, and pro-Palestinian activists have raised concerns about censorship and suppression of protests against the war, calls for a ceasefire, criticism of US military and diplomatic support for Israel, and criticism of Israel's invasion of Gaza and its military conduct there. The term has also regularly been used to criticize university policies which restrict pro-Palestine campus protests, including those which call for disinvestment from Israel.

=== Digital anti-Palestinian racism ===
The censorship of Palestinian and pro-Palestinian voices on the internet, particularly on social media, has been referred to as "digital apartheid" or "digital occupation".

Facebook and Instagram have been accused of anti-Palestinian bias by digital rights activists. Other websites accused of anti-Palestinian bias include Reddit, YouTube, Twitter, and PayPal.

In October 2023, during the first month of the Gaza genocide, online commenters reacted to an anti-Palestinian racist and Islamophobic compilation video of Israeli influencers' contributions to a new TikTok trend, noting that Palestinians had been irrationally singled out using the Pallywood trope, an example of the ethnicity-based Islamophobia, and that it had a "revolting" nature, possibly due to "[the filmers'] kids [...] learning how to be racist from a very young age". Makeup was used both to perform the Pallywood trope and to exaggerate inherited attributes, purported and otherwise, as the ready-made explanation for the behavioral trait supposedly identified. The "users [were] applying black makeup to thicken their eyebrows and blacken their teeth".

=== Anti-Palestinian chants on Jerusalem Day ===
Since 2011, Israeli nationalists have made anti-Palestinian chants such as "death to Arabs" (Israeli Hebrew: מָוֶת לָעֲרָבִים, romanized: Mávet la'Aravím) in parades on Jerusalem Day. Other chants include "May Your Village Burn," "Muhammad is dead," "a Jew is a soul, an Arab is a son of a whore," "burn Shu'afat" or "Shu'afat is on fire" in reference to the Palestinian neighborhood in East Jerusalem where a Palestinian boy was kidnapped and set on fire, as well as the Hebrew curse with Biblical origins for enemies of the Jewish people "may their name be erased." According to Nadera Shalhoub-Kevorkian, the Jerusalem Day parade is a "spatialized enactment of power," and in 2015, "over 30,000 young religious and nationalist Israeli Jews rampaged throughout the Old City of OEJ chanting 'Death to Arabs', 'Muhammad is Dead' and other racist slogans, restructuring the sensory experiences of Palestinians in the space."

=== Anti-Palestinian racism during Gaza war ===
Following the October 7 attacks, and the outbreak of the Gaza war, there has been a surge of anti-Palestinian racism, anti-Arab racism, and Islamophobia. Palestinians have expressed concerns over increased anti-Palestinian racism in mass media and anti-Palestinian hate crimes. Human rights groups have noted an increase in anti-Palestinian hate speech and incitement to violence against Palestinians.

=== Other examples ===
Opponents of anti-Palestinianism sometimes allege that it is as serious a moral failing as antisemitism, but believe that anti-Palestinianism goes unrecognized or underrecognized within Western societies.

After fashion retailer Zara condemned anti-Palestinian comments made by one of its senior designers in June 2021, the East Jerusalem born and raised model Qaher Harhash said the fashion industry should stand up against anti-Palestinian sentiment:

We usually see brands standing against anti-Semitism, but it's also time we see brands standing against anti-Palestinianism.

In 2015, Spanish BDS activists accused the Jewish-American rapper Matisyahu of being anti-Palestinian and temporarily succeeded in having his appearance at the Rototom Sunsplash festival cancelled.

== See also ==
- Anti-BDS laws
- Anti-Palestinian racism during the Gaza war
- Antisemitism
- Anti-Zionism
- Criticism of Israel
- Death to Arabs
- Dehumanization of Palestinians in Israeli discourse
- List of opponents of the BDS movement
- Palestinianism
- Racism in Jewish communities
- Weaponization of antisemitism
- Zionism as settler colonialism

== Sources ==
- "2021 NDP National Policy Convention: Ensuring Peace & Justice for Palestine". Palestine Resolution 2021. Archived from the original on 9 December 2021.
- Abdelkader, Rima (17 June 2021). "Fashion retailer Zara condemns anti-Palestinian comments made by designer". NBC News.
- Abu-Laban, Yasmeen; Bakan, Abigail B. (September 2021). "Anti-Palestinian Racism: Analyzing the Unnamed and Suppressed Reality". In Aidi, Hisham; Lynch, Marc; Mampilly, Zachariah (eds.). Racial Formations in Africa and the Middle East: A Transregional Approach (PDF). Vol. 44. Pomeps Studies. pp. 143–149.
- Aivalis, Christo (10 April 2021). "2021 NDP convention day two: Party takes historic step on Palestine". Canadian Dimension.
- Alz, Natalie; Ayoub, Malak (24 June 2021). "The Palestinian Model Who Took on Zara: 'We Must Stop Being Afraid'". Haaretz.
- Beinart, Peter (16 July 2021). "It's Time to Name Anti-Palestinian Bigotry: Anti-Palestinianism is as ubiquitous as it is invisible". Jewish Currents.
- Bennhold, Katrin (17 May 2019). "German Parliament Deems B.D.S. Movement Anti-Semitic". The New York Times.
- Brooking, Emerson T.; Campbell, Eliza (3 December 2021). "How to End Israel's Digital Occupation". Foreign Policy.
- El-Haroun, Zainah (3 November 2021). "Digital rights activists accuse Facebook of anti-Palestinian bias". Reuters.
- Elassar, Alaa (14 May 2021). "A NYC mosque was vandalized with anti-Palestinian graffiti". CNN.
- Engler, Yves (15 May 2018). "It is long past time to confront anti-Palestinianism in NDP". Yves Engler.com.
- Eno, Brian (4 February 2021). "Artists like me are being censored in Germany – because we support Palestinian rights". The Guardian.
- "France asks police to ban pro-Palestinian protest in Paris". Al Jazeera English. 13 May 2021.
- Gadzo, Mersiha (20 September 2020). "'Anti-Palestinian racism': Appointment row at Toronto university". Al Jazeera English.
- Haber, Jeremiah (16 April 2016). "Fight anti-Palestinianism as we would anti-Semitism". +972 Magazine.
- Kane, Alex (16 November 2021). "George Washington University Employees Offered Support to Palestinian Students. Now They Say They're Paying the Price". Jewish Currents.
- Kennedy, Abby; Trivedi, Isha (18 November 2021). "Complaint alleges University discriminated against Palestinian students". The GW Hatchet.
- Khoury, Lisa (16 December 2017). "Palestinians in Lebanon: 'It's like living in a prison'". Al Jazeera English.
- LeVine, Mark (23 August 2015). "Should Matisyahu play at a peace festival?". Al Jazeera English.
- Maira, Sunaina (2016). The 9/11 Generation: Youth, Rights, and Solidarity in the War on Terror. NYU Press. ISBN 978-1-4798-8051-5.
- Moor, Ahmed (24 June 2010). "Why Palestinians are second-class citizens in Lebanon". The Guardian.
- Nasr, Joseph; Alkousaa, Riham (17 May 2019). "Germany designates BDS Israel boycott movement as anti-Semitic". Reuters.
- O'Keefe, Derrick (16 February 2018). "Palestine resolution narrowly stopped from hitting NDP convention floor". Ricochet Media.
- Ontiveros, Roberto (18 August 2015). "Matisyahu Tour News: 'One Day' Singer Cut From Spanish Concert Over Palestinian Issue". Latin Post.
- Pilkington, Ed (21 May 2021). "US campuses become a growing front in Israeli-Palestinian conflict". The Guardian.
- Saad, Lydia (19 March 2021). "Americans Still Favor Israel While Warming to Palestinians". Gallup.
- Tahhan, Zena Al (7 October 2021). "Rights groups to PayPal: End discrimination against Palestinians". Al Jazeera English.
- Zahzah, Omar (13 May 2021). "Digital apartheid: Palestinians being silenced on social media". Al Jazeera English.
