= Progressive except Palestine =

Political pejorative

"Progressive except Palestine" (also known as PEP, alternatively written as "progressive except for Palestine") is a phrase that refers to organizations or individuals who describe themselves politically as progressive, liberal, or left-wing but who do not extend those liberal values to Palestinians or do not comment on the Israeli–Palestinian conflict. Those who use the phrase regard the position it describes as a type of political hypocrisy and an example of anti-Palestinianism. Critics of the phrase regard it as anti-Israel and a smear against the Zionist or pro-Israel left.

== Responses ==
Philip Mendes, a professor at Monash University, has criticized the phrase as a buzzword and a jibe that demonizes the State of Israel. Andrew E. Harrod, writing for The Detroit Jewish News, dismissed the term as "anti-Israel propaganda" and "Israel-hatred" that is rooted in lies about the Israeli state.

David Bernstein, writing for The Washington Post, states that PEP has become a litmus test for left-wing political correctness, saying that left-wing Zionists are forced to choose between their leftism and their Zionism and that left-wing Jewish Zionists in particular may face accusations that their support for Zionism is tribal.

Writing for Current Affairs, Ruqaiyah Zarook says that while the usage of the phrase is recent, critics of left-wing Zionists argue the phenomenon has existed for decades. She brings up French leftists Jean-Paul Sartre and Michel Foucault as early examples of the PEP phenomenon, noting their lack of public sympathy for Palestinians. She describes Palestinian academic Edward Said as an early critic of Sartre's silence on Palestine. Zarook lists several progressive American politicians as examples of PEP: Ayanna Pressley and Ro Khanna for voting in favour of the anti-Boycott, Divestment and Sanctions House Resolution 246, Alexandria Ocasio-Cortez for providing a confusing plan for peace, Tulsi Gabbard for being silent on Israel's bombardment of Gaza, Beto O'Rourke for trying "to appease supporters on both sides of the conflict" and Kamala Harris for insisting that Israel meets international human rights standards.

In September 2022, Rashida Tlaib wrote on an online forum: "I want you all to know that among progressives, it's become clear that you cannot claim to hold progressive values, yet back Israel's apartheid government, and we will continue to push back and not accept that you are progressive except for Palestine". Several Democratic politicians and Jewish leaders critiqued the position, some of them describing the comment as antisemitic.

== See also ==
- Liberal hawk
- Palestine exception
