= The Information State =

The Information State: Politics in the Age of Total Control
- Author: Jacob Siegel
- Language: English
- Publisher: Henry Holt and Company
- Pages: 336
- ISBN: 978-1250363121

The Information State: Politics in the Age of Total Control is a 2026 book by Jacob Siegel.

== Summary ==
Siegel wrote in the book about what he described as the "information state", which he said was established in the 21st century. According to him, the Obama and Biden administrations had used terroristic and national safety threats as pretext to increase the power of technocrats by partnering up government agencies, nonprofits, academics and big tech companies. He wrote that the government of the United States had attempted to censor the populist movements of the 2010s under the pretext of combatting Russian disinformation. Siegel further wrote about how, he stated, the government tried to censor information about Hunter Biden's laptop, deplatform January 6 rioters and crack down on COVID-19 vaccine skepticism.

== Reception ==
Jerry Stephens of the Library Journal stated that he recommended the book for "for readers concerned about current affairs and privacy".

William Rice of the Washington Independent Review of Books wrote that although Siegel presented his book as an evenhanded account of facts, "he doesn’t always play it straight". He wrote that one of the principal questions of the book is to what extent society should trust experts, but the book does not offer any "advice on how to prevent healthy citizen skepticism from descending into the full-blown rejection of reasoned analysis in which we’re now mired".

Rice stated that while Siegel worried about freedom of speech being "potentially imperiled by overbearing Democratic administrations", president Donald Trump had "routinely violate[d] a whole range of constitutional protections". Rice wrote that Obama and Biden had attempted to suppress "potentially dangerous misinformation about terrorism, COVID, and the 2020 election", and Trump had "talk-show hosts taken off the air if he [did not] like their jokes".

A review on Publishers' Weekly described the book as a "mixed bag". It stated that "while spotlighting the dangerous precedent set by liberal censorship of conservative speech is a provocative and original contribution, at times it feels like [Siegel]’s overcorrecting, with no mention of how people on the left have been deplatformed for pro-Palestinian views, for instance".
