= Palestinianism =

Pro-Palestinian sentiment

"Palestinianism" is a term occasionally used to denote either the national political movement or identity of the Palestinian people. It was used by Edward Said and others to describe the distinct nationalism of Palestinians as distinct from broader Arab nationalism or Pan-Arabism in the wake of the defeat of the Arab states in the 1967 Six-Day War. The term has also been used by anti-Palestinian writers such as Bat Yeor to describe Palestinian nationalism as a hostile ideology.

== Early use ==
During the British Mandate over Palestine, the word was used as a loose expression to either describe the integration of the Zionist Aliyah into Mandatory Palestine, or as an alternative to Non-Zionism.

Multiple observers in the early 1970s were under the impression that Palestinian national identity was a product of the late 1960s. However, others pointed to its prior existence in the early 20th century in Mandatory Palestine, as well as the period between 1948 and 1967.

== 1970s ==
The word was employed as a term in its modern meaning as early as 1970 by Edward Said in his work "A Palestinian voice".

It was also used in 1970 by Alfred Sherman, the London correspondent for Haaretz at the time, while expressing his surprise that the Palestinians' bid for independent statehood had garnered widespread support in the West. Sherman described it as the irredentist claim on all of Palestine and rejection of being part of the Hashemite state, and argued that Palestinianism emerged after the disillusionment with the outcome of the Six-Day War, in the aftermath of which Palestinian Arabs realized that they had to rely on their own resources, rather than on the broader Arab world, to secure their aspirations. For Sherman, it was founded in the refusal of Arab states to integrate Palestinian populations and the separate identity promoted by UNRWA. According to Sherman, Israeli Jews were uncomfortable with Palestinian nationalism, since the aspiration of Palestinians for statehood ("Palestinianism") mirrored exactly what Jews had sought by Zionism. To challenge Palestinians on this ground would mean Israelis would find themselves querying a right they themselves had asserted and therefore implicitly question the legitimacy of the Israeli state itself. (Note: "The Israelis' slowness to react to the idea of a Palestinian Arab nation also reflected their ideological history and present problems. Having devoted much of their political apprenticeship to demonstrating that the Jews were indeed a nation, and that each nation deserved its own national home, they were ill at ease when faced with the prospect of questioning either another group's claim to nationhood or the self-evident corollary that this ipso facto entitled them to statehood.." (Sherman 1971, p. 112))

In 1973, John B. Wolf made a similar diagnosis to that advanced by Sherman: the 1967 war had compelled Palestinians to recognize the truth of their isolation from allies. Citing Said's 1970 essay, he said their "Palestinianism" thereby developed two goals: to integrate themselves with the land they lost, and to change a politics that had excluded and "negated their presence", denying Palestinians a say in their own future. (Note: "The failure of contemporary international relations to gauge the efficacy of Palestinian nationalism is understandable; even the Palestinians did not become aware of their latent ability to help themselves until after the Six-Day War. That war demonstrated to them that Arab military forces were no match for the Israeli defense organizations, and that only they themselves were sufficiently motivated to continue the prosecution of an armed and protracted struggle to regain their homeland. Their recognition of this truth is the source of 'Palestinianism,' a national political movement with two objectives. The first objective is to achieve the full integration of the Arab Palestinian with his lost lands, and its second objective is to alter the political situation which has excluded him or negated his presence in the formulation of plans concerning his future."(Wolf 1973, p. 6))

Similarly, Harkabi Yehoshafat, in his 1974 book Palestinians and Israel, described Palestinianism as the specific national identity of Palestinian Arabs, rooted in the land, that after 1967 fully emerged as a distinct national liberation movement distinct from Pan-Arabism. He described it as aiming for the negation of Zionism and the Israeli state.

=== Edward Said's usage of the term ===
For Edward Said, Israel and its supporters had striven to deny Palestinians, with their long and fragmented history of dispossession, war, exile and ethnic cleansing, "permission to narrate" what they had undergone as a result of the establishment of the state of Israel. Said defined the term as "a political movement that is being built out of a reassertion of Palestine's multiracial and multireligious history", aimed at the "full integration" of Palestinian Arabs into the land of Palestine and into the political processes controlling the land. (Note: "if one believes that the crux of the Near East today is the conflict between Israel and a dispersed, or occupied, population of Palestinian Arabs, then a clearer view of that problem becomes possible. For the major distraction to any scrutiny of the region has been everyone's unwillingness to allow for a Palestinian presence. This has been no less true of the Palestinians themselves than it has of the other Arabs, or of Israel. My thesis is that since 1967 the confusions have somewhat diminished because the Palestinians have had to recognize this truth, and have gradually begun to act upon it. This recognition is the source of what I call Palestinianism: a political movement that is being built out of a reassertion of Palestine's multiracial and multireligious history. The aim of Palestinianism is the full integration of the Arab Palestinian with lands and, more importantly with political processes that for twenty-one years have either systematically excluded him or made him a more and more intractable prisoner." (Said 2007, p. 16)) According to Adam Shatz, US editor for the London Review of Books, Said endeavoured to elaborate a "counter-myth" to that which underwrote Zionism, one written in counterpoint to the "dark historical fatalism and exclusionary fear of the other" characteristic of the Zionist narrative. "Palestinianism" for Said referred to a kind of open-ended dissident narrative testifying to the contradictions of exile and military occupation, one that was non-doctrinal, unobsessed with racial ontology, as a premise for the creation of a future for both Palestinians and Jews.

As construed by Ilan Pappé, Said's "Palestinianism" was a compromise between the narrow call of nationalist impulses and the universal values he subscribed to, consisting in striving to overcome both Zionism and Arab tyrannies by the three principles of acknowledgement, accountability and acceptance: namely, global recognition of the Nakba which was more important than achieving Palestinian statehood; in obeisance to universal principles, Israel should accept its accountability for ethnic cleansing, as a prelude to a future return of refugees; and, thirdly, an acceptance of the historic reality of Jewish suffering, a precondition for integrating Israelis into the larger Arab world within which their state was founded.

== "Palestinianism" as a threat ==
In 2005, writing in the context of the Al-Aqsa Intifada, Bat Ye'or, in her book Eurabia: The Euro-Arab Axis, which advanced a conspiracy theory surrounding the emergence of Palestinianism, dedicated a whole chapter to the word, entitled "Palestinianism: The New Eurabian Cult", where she claimed that Palestinianism, which she glossed as "Palestinolatry", was both a new vehicle for traditional European antisemitism, and "a return of the Euro-Arab Nazism of the 1930–1940s." In her view, it emerged with the works of the Anglican bishop and theologian Kenneth Cragg and the Palestinian Anglican priest Naim Ateek, director of the Jerusalem-based Sabeel Ecumenical Liberation Theology Center. Neither of these writers, however, had ever used the term at the time of her writing, but Bat Ye'or deployed it to characterize what she saw as ecclesiastical attempts to play on European consciences by depicting Palestinian suffering under Israeli occupation. (Note: "Several times a day, television, radio and newspapers focus the European mind on an obsessive and ritual veneration of Palestinianism. Everything derives from it; everything goes back to it. A grieving Arab Palestine constantly calls on the distressed compassion of Europeans, provoking frustrated hatred against Israel, which is mentioned only in negative terms: occupation, injustice, apartheid, Nazism. Israel's population, which had liberated from dhimmitude a tiny corner from the vast Christian, Buddhist, and Hindu regions colonized by Arabs, appears to have been expelled to another galaxy." (Ye'or 2005, p. 180)) The impact of this "Palestinianism" can be discerned, she claimed further, in the positions of major politicians in Europe, ranging from Jacques Chirac, Javier Solana, Romano Prodi to Dominique de Villepin and Mary Robinson, who came to consider the Palestinian problem a central issue for world peace. For her, Christian evocations of the plight of Palestinians betrayed an underlying tradition of Christian demonization of Jews, and had assumed the status of a "modern Eurabian cult". More specifically, in theological terms, she interpreted this "Christian Palestinianism" as heretical, because she claimed that it was a variety of Marcionism. (Note: "The Christian policy that would eliminate the Jewish source of Christianity by suppressing the link between the Hebrtew Bible and the Gospels represents an old and lingering trend, always opposed by the Church. It was first formulated by Marcion, a second-century Byzantine priest of pagan background who was strongly influenced by Gnosticism. Today, Palestinian Marecionism (Palestinianism) paves the way for the Islamization of the Church as it prepares mentalities for an Islamic replacement theology." (Ye'or 2005, p. 213))

The term was subsequently picked up as a negative description for the Palestinian cause, by British journalist Melanie Phillips in her Londonistan: How Britain Is Creating a Terror State Within, where she claimed that the Muslim Association of Britain, in her view an arm of the Muslim Brotherhood, had become the "spearhead" of "radical Palestinianism" in Great Britain.

In 2007, the idea that Palestinian national rights were a threat to Western civilization, and in particular to its religious values, was argued for in a book by evangelical theologian Paul Wilkinson, a British Christian Zionist. He devoted a chapter in his book For Zion's Sake, to what he called "Christian Palestinianism", as the antithesis of Christian Zionism. He pursued his assertions in more detail in 2017, in the second volume, entitled Israel Betrayed – Volume 2: The rise of Christian Palestinianism, of his study of replacement theology. Wilkinson says that there is no such thing as a Palestinian people, their nation, language, culture and religion are hoaxes perpetrated by anti-Christian liberals. The very idea itself is merely "another tactical manoeuvre in the Islamic war waged against Israel to effect her destruction." Other Christians, in particular Palestinian Christians who criticize Israel, speaking of the "perceived" suffering of Palestinians, foment Jew-hatred in favouring pro-Palestinian propaganda. The book was excoriated by theologian Darren M. Slade. professor of humanities at the Rocky Mountain College of Art and Design. (Note: "Wilkinson is no scholar. His writing does not demonstrate the meticulousness necessary for a balanced, equitable, and disinterested presentation of the type of specialized research expected of genuine scholarship. ... The book clearly has an ideological agenda because of its uncontrolled need to slander and attack non-Zionists. The book's conclusions are without warrant, the opinions and judgments without evidence, the opposition without a fair presentation, and the author without a clear sense of scholarship." (Slade 2016, pp. 21–22))

== Modern usage ==
In 2008, Jason Franks, a Research Fellow in the School of International Relations at the University of St. Andrews, cited Said in using the term Palestinianism to denote the ensemble of values, beliefs, traditions and history underwriting Palestinian nationhood. (Note: "Palestinianism or Palestinian Nationalism is the other principle discourse in the Palestinian-Israeli conflict, and like Zionism can also be seen as an identity discourse. ... Acceptance of the discourse of Palestinianism is an acceptance of the assumptions upon which it is based. These include territory, identity, history, culture, and religion. Palestinianism is not only a reaction against Zionism and British imperialism but also against the wider Arab world; it is an expression of a collective and individual entity. Schultz points out that there is no single understanding of the phenomenon and suggests that Palestinian Nationalism can be understood by employing a number of different discourses, from ethnographic, through religious to nationalist." (Franks 2006, p. 129)) In his analysis, it stood in diametrical opposition to Zionism, and both it and Zionism were twin ideological codes competing in the Israeli–Palestinian conflict, both accounting for the terroristic, nationalist and religious elements driving the conflict. (Note: "The Palestinian-Israeli conflict has two principal ideological motivations for terrorism, nationalism and religion, in the guise of Palestinianism and Zionism, and Islam and Judaism." (Franks 2006, p. 181)) The roots of Palestinianism lay, he further argued, in the Young Turks' revolt in 1908, which was crucial to the emergence of a Palestinian nationalist sentiment in that period because the revolution in Turkey freed up the press from Ottoman censorship, and enabled local assertions of a distinct identity to emerge. It developed thereafter "not only (as) a reaction against Zionism and British imperialism but also against the wider Arab world."

In 2010 Palestinianism was described in op eds by Israeli journalist Moshe Dann as an "ideology", that viewed Israel as a settler-colonial state, and one which had two immediate goals: Palestinian statehood in the Palestinian territories defined by the 1949 armistice lines, and the implementation of the right of return of Palestinian refugees. According to Dann, who repeated his claims in 2021, the long-term goal of the "elimination of Israel" was explicitly called for in both the Palestinian National Covenant, (nullified in 1996 after the Oslo Accords), and the 1988 Hamas Covenant. This "ideology" had been, he asserted, legitimized by Israel itself by the 1993 Oslo Accords.

In her 2016 monograph on Palestinian comedy, UK-based arts researcher Chrisoula Lionis traced the development of Palestinian national awareness. She argues that there was a transition via three core episodes from "Palestinianess", stirred by both the Balfour Declaration of 1917, and the 1948 nakba, which crystallised this national consciousness, to "Palestinianism" proper, which she sees as the outcome of the Battle of Karameh in 1968.

Writing in 2016, Tower Magazine journalist, and then advisor to The Israel Project Ben Cohen, described Palestinianism as the core ideology informing recent antisemitism, one that assumes the guise of a social movement which, bundling together neo-fascists, liberals, extreme leftists, and Islamicists, is militantly opposed to the age of Jewish self-empowerment after 1945. (Note: "From this vantage point, the Palestinians become iconic, transcendental victims, rather like the Jews were for a brief period after the Second World War. Those who kneel before the altar of Palestinian suffering with almost spiritual fervor can be relied on to traffic in the kinds of themes that have now gained a foothold in mainstream discourse: that Israel, the Jewish state, is a carbon copy of South Africa's old aparetheid regime, that it consciously mimics the practices of the Nazis, that it is – as formulated in the perverse Twitter hashtag #JHSIL-a Jewish reflection of the Islamic State terrorist gang than has raped, murdered, enslaved and decapitated thousands of innocents in Syria and Iraq." (Cohen 2016, pp. 9–10, 10)) in 2024, Cohen credited Melanie Phillips for this use of the term, and later described Palestinianism as a "cult".

== Anti-Palestinianism ==
In 2021, Peter Beinart, writing in Jewish Currents, described what he called anti-Palestinianism, a form of bigotry – "treating people as inferior because of their group identity" – which is, he argues, commonplace throughout American society. (Note: "ANTI-PALESTINIANISM is not only commonplace in Congress. It's commonplace across American society. It's not just that prominent media, business, and religious figures argue openly that Palestinians under Israeli control be denied elemental human rights. Americans who advocate for those rights are often penalized for doing so. On college campuses, administrators frequently cancel lectures, classes, professorships, and even entire student organizations, because they espouse pro-Palestinian views. Pro-Israel politicians and organizations pressure museums, theaters, and concert halls to deny venues to pro-Palestinian performers." (Beinart 2021)) The bigotry of anti-Palestinianism, for Beinart, is "ubiquitous" notwithstanding the fact that, unlike "anti-Israeli" or "anti-Jewish", the word "anti-Palestinian" hardly exists. (Note: "In public discourse, examples of anti-Semitism are numerous, but a search for illustrations of prejudice towards Palestine and Palestinians yields almost nothing. To fill this vacuum, and to hinder the rush to endorse the poorly conceived International Holocaust Remembrance Association (IHRA) definition of anti-Semitism, a statement of anti-Palestinianism is desperately needed." (Rees 2021)) Beinart makes an historical analogy between anti-Semitism and anti-Palestinianism. Citing historian David Feldman, he notes that there was no term to denote treating Jews as inferior before pressure for treating Jews equally gained some political traction in the 19th century. Once they had achieved legal recognition, the term antisemitism came into use to denote those hostile to parity of rights for Jewish citizens. A similar logic applies, he argues, to the term (anti-)Palestinianism, a term that remained unnameable because throughout the 20th century, American and Israeli discourse hardly even tolerated the word "Palestinian".

== See also ==
- Palestine (region)
- Palestinian nationalism
- Palestinian self-determination

== Works cited ==
- Bangstad, Sindre (2019). "Bat Ye'or and Eurabia". In Sedgwick, Mark (ed.). Key Thinkers of the Radical Right: Behind the New Threat to Liberal Democracy. Oxford University Press. pp. 170–184. ISBN 978-0-190-87761-3 – via ResearchGate.
- Beinart, Peter (16 July 2021). "It's Time to Name Anti-Palestinian Bigotry: Anti-Palestinianism is as ubiquitous as it is invisible". Jewish Currents.
- Cohen, Ben (2016). "Antisemitism in the Age of Jewish Empowerment". In Wistrich, Robert S. (ed.). Anti-Judaism, Antisemitism, and Delegitimizing Israel. University of Nebraska Press. pp. 1–13. ISBN 978-0-803-29672-5.
- Congressional Record: Proceedings and Debates of the 92d Congress. First Session. Volume 117-Part 18. July 1971. p. 23856.
- Congressional Record: Proceedings and Debates of the 93d Congress. First Session. Volume 119-Part 14. May–June 1973. p. 17603.
- Congressional Record: Proceedings and Debates of the 93d Congress. Second Session. Volume 120-Part 31. December 1974. p. 41275.
- Cragg, Kenneth (1991). The Arab Christian: A History in the Middle East. Westminster John Knox Press. ISBN 978-0-664-21945-1.
- Dann, Moshe (13 September 2010). "Who are the Palestinians?". Ynetnews. Ynet.
- Dann, Moshe (7 August 2021). "The immoral goals of Palestinianism". The Jerusalem Post.
- Franks, Jason (2006). Rethinking the Roots of Terrorism. Springer. ISBN 978-0-230-50242-0.
- Fulford, Robert (8 November 2014). "Anti-semitism in the guise of 'Palestinianism'". National Post.
- Gerber, Haim (2003). "Zionism, Orientalism, and the Palestinians". Journal of Palestine Studies. 33 (1): 23–41. doi:10.1525/jps.2003.33.1.23. JSTOR 10.1525/jps.2003.33.1.23.
- Gerson, Allan (1978). Israel, the West Bank and international law. Abingdon: Frank Cass. pp. 79, 80. ISBN 0-7146-3091-8.
- Haugen, Hans Morten (2017). "Defining Christian Palestinianism: Words Matter". Middle East Policy. 24 (2): 41–56. doi:10.1111/mepo.12266. SSRN 3058004.
- Ice, Thomas (2017). The Case for Zionism: Why Christians Should Support Israel. New Leaf Publishing Group. ISBN 978-0-892-21753-3.
- Iskandar, Adel; Rustom, Hakem, eds. (2010). Edward Said: a Legacy of Emancipation and Representation. University of California Press (Berkely). p. 32. ISBN 978-0-520-24546-4.
- Jansen, Godfrey H. (1971). Zionism, Israel, and Asian Nationalism. Institute for Palestine Studies. p. 284.
- Jeffries, Joseph Mary Nagle (1923). The Palestine deception. pp. 12–13.
- Lionis, Chrisoula (2016). Laughter in Occupied Palestine Comedy and Identity in Art and Film. I.B.Tauris. pp. 20–47. ISBN 978-0-85772-781-7.
- Monks, Kieron (17 July 2018). "Labour's anti-Semitism scandal has spilled over into attacks on Palestine solidarity". Middle East Eye.
- Moussa, Emad (23 November 2021). "It's time to talk about anti-Palestinianism as a form of bigotry". Mondoweiss.
- Pappé, Ilan (June 2010). "Diaspora as Catastrophe, Diaspora as a Mission and the Post-Colonial Philosophy of Edward Said". Policy Futures in Education. 6 (3) – via ResearchGate.
- Phillips, Melanie (2008) [First published 2006]. Londonistan: How Britain Is Creating a Terror State Within. Gibson Square. ISBN 978-1-906-14230-8.
- Phillips, Melanie (17 July 2021). "Palestinianism is opening up a posthumous Nazi front against Jews". Jewish News Syndicate.
- Rees, Stuart (15 September 2021). "Anti-Palestinianism is as damnable as anti-Semitism: a statement is long overdue". Pearls and Irritations.
- Said, Edward (16 February 1984). "Permission to narrate". London Review of Books. Vol. 6, no. 3.
- Said, Edward (21 October 1993). "The Morning After". London Review of Books. Vol. 15, no. 20.
- Said, Edward (2007). "The Palestinian Experience (1968-1969)". In Rubin, Andrew; Bayoumi, Moustafa (eds.). The Selected Works of Edward Said, 1966 - 2006. Knopf Doubleday Publishing Group. pp. 14–37. ISBN 978-0-307-42849-3.
- Shatz, Adam (6 May 2021). "Palestinianism". London Review of Books. Vol. 43, no. 9.
- Sherman, Alfred (March 1971). "The Palestinians: A Case of Mistaken National Identity?". The World Today. Vol. 27, no. 3. Royal Institute of International Affairs. pp. 104–114. JSTOR 40394475.
- Simpson, J.A.; Weiner, E.S.C., eds. (1989). Oxford English Dictionary. Vol. 11 (2nd ed.). Clarendon Press. ISBN 0-19-861223-0.
- Slade, Darren M. (21 March 2016). "Critical Book Review. For Zion's Sake: Christian Zionism and the Role of John Nelson Darby by Paul Richard Wilkinson". Religious Studies Review. 35 (2). Liberty Baptist Theological Seminary: 130–131.
- Steinberg, Milton (1945). A Partisan Guide to the Jewish Problem. Bobbs-Merrill Company. p. 239.
- Stone, Julius (1972). "Palestinian Arabs and Self-Determination". In Gershman, Carl; Howe, Irving (eds.). Israel, The Arabs and the Middle East. New York: Quadrangle Books. p. 200.
- Tulchinsky, Gerald (1987). "Clarence de Sola and Early Zionism in Canada, 1898–1920". In Rischin, Moses (ed.). The Jews of North America. Detroit: Wayne State University Press. pp. 174–193. ISBN 978-0-8143-1891-1.
- "War Approaches Palestine". The Economist. Vol. 140, no. 5103. 14 June 1941. p. 791.
- Wilkinson, Paul (2007). For Zion's Sake: Christian Zionism and the Role of John Nelson Darby. Paternoster Press. ISBN 978-1-842-27569-6.
- Wilkinson, Paul (2018). Jurik, Christiane K. (ed.). Israel Betrayed - Volume 2: The rise of Christian Palestinianism. Ariel Ministries. ISBN 978-1-935-17477-6.
- Wilkinson, Paul (2019a). "What Should We Think About Israel's " Occupation?"". In Price, Randall (ed.). What Should We Think About Israel?: Separating Fact from Fiction in the Middle East Conflict. Harvest House. pp. 123–134. ISBN 978-0-736-97780-7.
- Wilkinson, Paul (2019b). "What Should We Think About Palestinian Christians?". In Price, Randall (ed.). What Should We Think About Israel?: Separating Fact from Fiction in the Middle East Conflict. Harvest House. pp. 247–158. ISBN 978-0-736-97780-7.
- Wolf, John B. (January 1973). "Black September: Militant Palestinianism". Current History. 64 (377): 5–8, 37. doi:10.1525/curh.1973.64.377.5. JSTOR 45312785.
- Yehoshafat, Harkabi (1974). Palestinians and Israel. Halsted Press. p. 24. ISBN 0-470-35211-6.
- Ye'or, Bat (2005). Eurabia. Fairleigh Dickinson University Press. ISBN 978-0-838-64077-7.
