= Litmus test (politics) =

Question that determines one's candidacy for public office

In politics, a litmus test is a question asked of a potential candidate for high office, the answer to which would determine whether the nominating official would proceed with the appointment or nomination. The expression is a metaphor based on the litmus test in chemistry, in which one is able to test the general acidity of a substance, but not its exact pH. Those who must approve a nominee may also be said to apply a litmus test to determine whether the nominee will receive their vote. In these contexts, the phrase comes up most often with respect to nominations to the judiciary.

== Usage ==
The metaphor of a litmus test has been used in American politics since the mid-twentieth century. During United States presidential election campaigns, litmus tests the nominees might use are more fervently discussed when vacancies for the U.S. Supreme Court appear likely. Advocates for various social ideas or policies often wrangle heatedly over what litmus test, if any, the president ought to apply when nominating a new candidate for a spot on the Supreme Court. Support for, or opposition to, abortion is one example of a common decisive factor in single-issue politics; another might be support of strict constructionism. Defenders of litmus tests argue that some issues are so important that it overwhelms other concerns (especially if there are other qualified candidates that pass the test).

The political litmus test is often used when appointing judges. However, this test to determine the political attitude of a nominee is not without error. Supreme Court Chief Justice Earl Warren was appointed under the impression that he was conservative but his tenure was marked by liberal dissents. Today, the litmus test is used along with other methods such as past voting records when selecting political candidates.

The Republican Liberty Caucus is opposed to litmus tests for judges, stating in their goals that they "oppose 'litmus tests' for judicial nominees who are qualified and recognize that the sole function of the courts is to interpret the Constitution. We oppose judicial amendments or the crafting of new law by any court."

Professor Eugene Volokh believes that the legitimacy of such tests is a "tough question", and argues that they may undermine the fairness of the judiciary:

Imagine a justice testifies under oath before the Senate about his views on (say) abortion, and later reaches a contrary decision [after carefully examining the arguments]. "Perjury!" partisans on the relevant side will likely cry: They'll assume the statement made with an eye towards confirmation was a lie, rather than that the justice has genuinely changed his mind. Even if no calls for impeachment follow, the rancor and contempt towards the justice would be much greater than if he had simply disappointed his backers' expectations. Faced with that danger, a justice may well feel pressured into deciding the way that he testified, and rejecting attempts at persuasion. Yet that would be a violation of the judge's duty to sincerely consider the parties' arguments.

== See also ==
- Diversity, equity, and inclusion#Mandatory diversity statements within academia
- Hardline, a stance on an issue that is inflexible and not subject to compromise
- Political commissar
- Purity test (politics)
