= Columbia Law Review =

- Discipline: Jurisprudence
- Language: English
- Edited by: Adam L. Burns

Publication details
- History: 1901–present
- Publisher: Columbia Law Review Association, Inc. (United States)
- Frequency: 8/year
- Open access: Yes
- Impact factor: 2.224 (2018)

Standard abbreviations
- Bluebook: Colum. L. Rev.
- ISO 4: Columbia Law Rev.

Indexing
- CODEN: COLRAO
- ISSN: 0010-1958 (print); 1945-2268 (web)
- LCCN: 29-10105
- JSTOR: 00101958
- OCLC no.: 01564231

Links
- Journal homepage

The Columbia Law Review is a law review edited and published by students at Columbia Law School. The journal publishes scholarly articles, essays, and student notes.

It was established in 1901 by Joseph E. Corrigan, who served as the review's first editor-in-chief, and John M. Woolsey, who served as its first secretary. The Columbia Law Review is one of four law reviews that publishes the Bluebook.

== History ==
The Columbia Law Review represents the school's third attempt at a student-run law periodical. In 1885, the Columbia Jurist was founded by a group of six students but ceased publication in 1887. Despite its short run, the Jurist is credited with partially inspiring the creation of the Harvard Law Review, which began publication a short time later.

The second journal, the Columbia Law Times was founded in 1887 and closed down in 1893 due to lack of revenue.

Publication of the current Columbia Law Review began in 1901, making it the fifth oldest surviving law review in the US. Dean William Keener took an active involvement during its founding to help ensure its longevity.

=== Nakba article ===
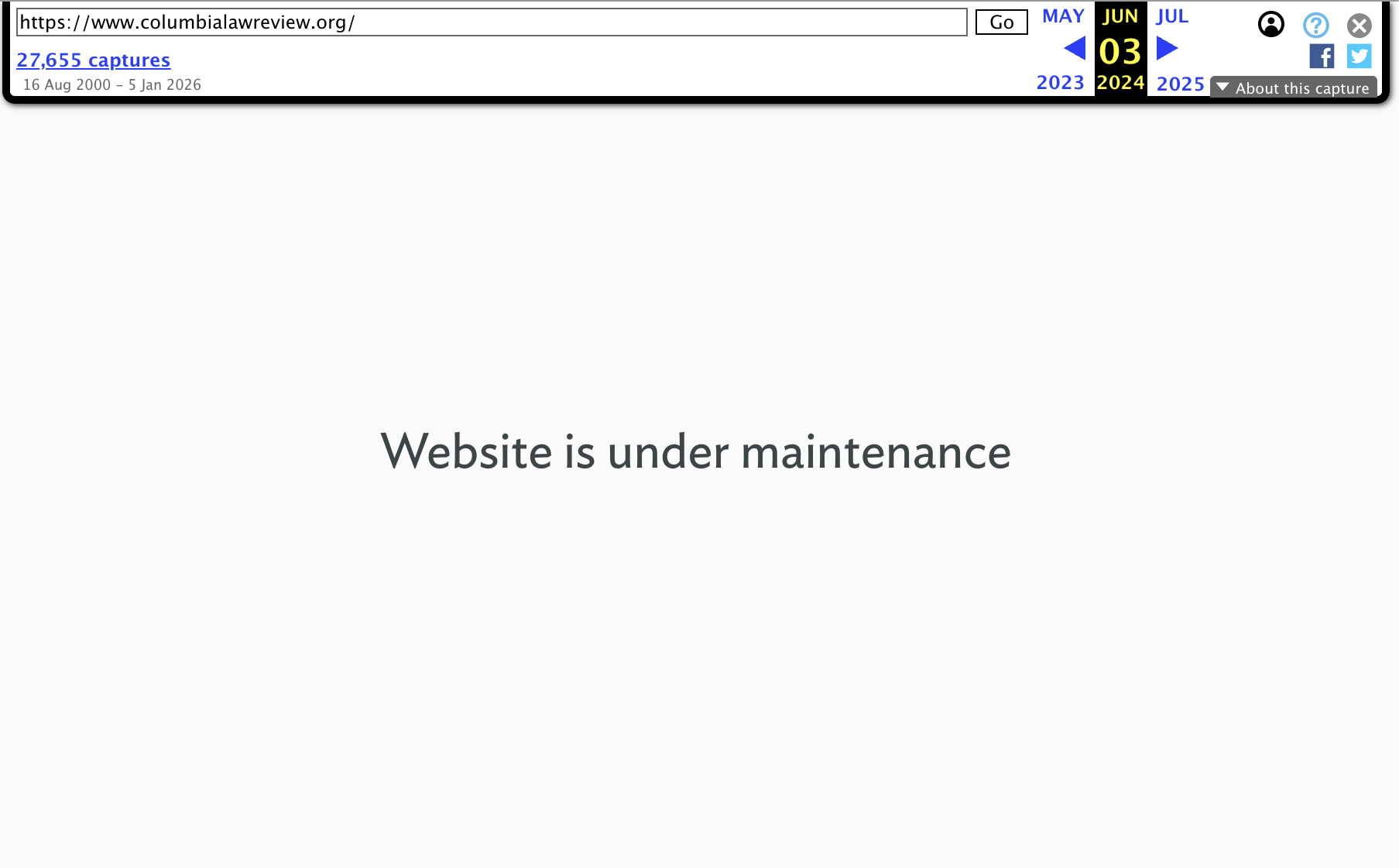
The board of directors of the Columbia Law Review took down its entire website hours after its publication of Toward Nakba as a Legal Concept by Rabea Eghbariah. The website was reinstated after a 20-5 majority of staff editors voted to strike.

In June 2024, the journal published an article by Rabea Eghbariah, a Palestinian human rights lawyer, titled "Toward Nakba as a Legal Concept", which criticizes the "brutally sophisticated regime of oppression" of Palestinians "[a]cross Israel, the West Bank, the Gaza Strip, Jerusalem, and refugee camps" by the Israeli government. The article aims at creating an international legal framework for the Nakba similar to genocide and apartheid. The article also refers to the Arabic term "al-Nakba," which "is often used ... to refer to the ruinous establishment of Israel in Palestine."

The same day that the article was published, the Review's board of directors shut down the Review's website and replaced it with a message stating that the site was "under maintenance". Later that day, the Review's student editors published the article on a publicly accessible web site, as a free PDF file. Two days after the website was shut down, the editors voted to go on strike. The next day, the board of directors restored the Review's website, including Eghbariah's article, but added a statement explaining that the website was shut-down due to the "secretive" nature of the editorial process. The editorial board disagreed with that assertion and stated that the editorial process was comparable to that used for all other articles.

== Impact ==
Among United States law journals as of 2025, Columbia Law Review is ranked #1 by Washington and Lee University Law School and as of 2023, #4 by a professor at the University of Oregon School of Journalism and Communication.

The Columbia Law Review was the top-cited law journal during the 2018 Supreme Court term.

According to the Journal Citation Reports the Columbia Law Review had a 2009 impact factor of 3.610, ranking it third out of 116 journals in the category "Law". In 2007, the Columbia Law Review ranked second for submissions and citations within the legal academic community, after Harvard Law Review.

== Notable alumni ==
Notable alumni of the Columbia Law Review include:

- U.S. Supreme Court Justices
  - William O. Douglas
  - Ruth Bader Ginsburg
- U.S. Courts of Appeals Judges
  - Wilfred Feinberg
  - Harold Leventhal
  - Paul R. Hays
  - Harold Medina
  - Jerre Stockton Williams
  - James Alger Fee
  - Daniel M. Friedman
  - Joseph Frank Bianco
  - Barbara Lagoa
- U.S. District Courts Judges
  - Jack Weinstein
  - Miriam Goldman Cedarbaum
  - Denise Cote
  - Alvin Hellerstein
  - William Bernard Herlands
  - John S. Martin Jr.
  - Edmund Louis Palmieri
  - Alexander Holtzoff
  - Dickinson Richards Debevoise
  - Richard F. Boulware
  - James Edward Doyle
  - Margaret Garnett
- U.S. Solicitors General
  - Charles Fried
  - Donald Verrilli Jr.
- Chairwoman of the Securities and Exchange Commission Mary Jo White
- Director of the CIA William Colby
- U.S. Attorney for the Southern District of New York Preet Bharara
- Chairman of the Federal Reserve Bank of New York and Director of the National Economic Council Stephen Friedman (PFIAB)
- Columbia University president Lee C. Bollinger
- Columbia Law School deans
  - Young B. Smith
  - Michael I. Sovern
  - Barbara Aronstein Black
- Columbia Law School professors
  - Herbert Wechsler
  - Oscar Schachter
  - Walter Gellhorn
  - Harvey Goldschmid
  - R. Kent Greenawalt
  - Gillian E. Metzger
  - E. Allan Farnsworth
- University of Pennsylvania Law School professors
  - Geoffrey C. Hazard Jr.
  - Howard Lesnick (Editor-in-Chief)
  - Amy Wax
- Yale Law School professors
  - Felix S. Cohen
  - Geoffrey C. Hazard Jr.
- Duke University School of Law professor George C. Christie
- Michigan Law School professor Mark D. West
- New York University Law School professor Samuel Estreicher
- Berkeley professor and criminal law scholar Sanford Kadish
- New York Governor George Pataki
- Virginia Lt. Gov. Justin Fairfax
- Two-time SEC General Counsel David M. Becker
- NBA Commissioner David Stern
- New York Supreme Court Justice Aron Steuer
- Prominent attorneys
  - George Davidson
  - Arthur Garfield Hays
  - Gary P. Naftalis
  - Charles Rembar
  - Louis S. Weiss
- Authors
  - Brad Meltzer

== Selected articles ==
- Cohen, Felix S. (1935). "Transcendental Nonsense and the Functional Approach". Columbia Law Review. 35 (6): 809–849. doi:10.2307/1116300. JSTOR 1116300.
- Fuller, Lon L. (1941). "Consideration and Form". Columbia Law Review. 41 (5): 799–824. doi:10.2307/1117840. JSTOR 1117840.
- Frankfurter, Felix (1947). "Some Reflections on the Reading of Statutes". Columbia Law Review. 47 (4): 527–546. doi:10.2307/1118049. JSTOR 1118049. S2CID 158802030.
- Hart, Henry M. (1954). "The Relations Between State and Federal Law". Columbia Law Review. 54 (4): 489–542. doi:10.2307/1119546. JSTOR 1119546.
- Wechsler, Herbert (1954). "The Political Safeguards of Federalism: The Role of the States in the Composition and Selection of the National Government". Columbia Law Review. 54 (4): 543–560. doi:10.2307/1119547. JSTOR 1119547.
