= Purity test (politics) =

Rigid standard to ensure ideological purity

In politics, a purity test is a rigid standard on a specific issue by which a politician or other figure is compared. Purity tests are established to ensure that the subject maintains ideological purity with the ideas supported by a particular group, often a political party or one specific faction of a party. Purity tests are often used in the form of strict in-group and out-group boundaries, where failure of purity tests indicates membership of an out-group. Purity tests are similar to the concept of litmus tests that are used in political nominations and appointments.

== Usage ==
=== Indonesia ===
During the New Order, purity tests were conducted on public servants in order to filter out people suspected to be communists or supportive to the communist cause. This is no longer practiced by the reformation.

=== United Kingdom ===
In the 2020s, members of the Labour Party were criticized for applying purity tests to their membership, and it has been attributed by some commentators as a reason for the party's electoral failure in the preceding years. Similar criticisms have also been made toward the Conservative Party in relation to issues such as Brexit.

=== United States ===
In American politics, Republicans that are perceived as failing purity tests are referred to as Republicans in Name Only (RINOs). Likewise, such Democrats are referred to as Democrats in Name Only (DINOs).

In 2009, some members of the Republican Party advocated a list of ten requirements that candidates would have to meet in order to receive financial support from the party. This list was described by critics as a purity test. Purity tests became more prominent in the Republican Party during and after the first Trump administration, where support for Donald Trump and his attempts to overturn the election have been described as the party's main purity test. Some Republican politicians, including Liz Cheney and Adam Kinzinger, were censured by their party for disagreement with Trump's false claims of election fraud. Measures to fight the COVID-19 pandemic met a similar response in the Republican Party, where opposition to certain measures had been described as a purity test.

In 2016, purity tests became an issue in the Democratic Party, especially in regard to issues such as abortion and health policy. This pattern continued during the 2020 Democratic Party presidential primaries, during which candidates and other major figures expressed concerns that purity tests were a cause for concern among the party. Former president Barack Obama broke his silence over the primary elections to warn Democrats about the danger of purity tests, saying that "we will not win just by increasing the turnout of the people who already agree with us completely on everything". In 2022, then-Democratic Senator Kyrsten Sinema was censured for disagreement with the party on filibuster reform, with some commentators describing this as an instance of purity testing.

Anti-Zionism and support for the Boycott, Divestment and Sanctions movement have been described as a litmus test for left-wing movements in the United States, with the term "Progressive except Palestine" having been used to describe politicians who describe themselves as being on the ideological left but do not support pro-Palestinian sentiment, or otherwise refuse to take a position in the Israeli–Palestinian conflict.

The Atlantic noted that following the election of Donald Trump to a second presidential term in 2024, some moderate Democrats had become quiet on cultural issues such as climate change, immigration, and transgender rights, under an impression that the party had focused too much on these positions during the 2024 election. California governor Gavin Newsom would likewise pivot towards conservative views on immigration and trans rights (including objecting to trans women in women's sports) and appear with right-wing personalities on a personal podcast whilst simultaneously opposing Trump, as part of an effort to promote himself as a moderate candidate for a potential presidential run in 2028. Democratic representative Seth Moulton argued that some Democratic lawmakers had a "fear of backlash"; following the 2024 elections, Moulton had faced criticism for comments that were interpreted as opposition to trans women in women's sports, and having accused Democrats of "spend[ing] way too much time trying not to offend anyone rather than being brutally honest about the challenges many Americans face", and "extreme left" social media users of saying that he had "failed the unspoken Democratic Party purity test." He would later walk back some of the comments, arguing that Democrats needed to be "willing to have tough conversations about these issues so that we have a more reasonable approach than the Republicans" amid the Trump administration's attempts to target transgender people, and that "when we have nothing, we refuse to even debate these issues, Trump succeeds at pushing his hateful agenda." When announcing a bid to run for Senate, Moulton stated that he was committed to protecting the rights of trans people, and that he had a goal to "push our party to have honest, tough conversations so we can fight back more effectively against the far-right attacks on LGBTQ Americans."

== See also ==
- Big tent – Broad political party
- Cleavage (politics) – Sociological concept
- Compromise – Negotiation strategy
- Culture war – Conflict between cultural values
- Hardline – Inflexible stance on a political issue
- Partisan (politics) – Committed supporter of a political party or belief
- Political posturing – Political appeals to emotion
- Wedge issue – Divisive political or social issue
- Whip (politics) – Position within some political parties
