= Shahzad Bashir (scholar) =

Professor of Religious Studies

Shahzad Bashir is Dean of Aga Khan University, Institute for the Study of Muslim Civilisations. Until 2024 he was the Aga Khan Professor of Islamic Humanities and Professor of Religious Studies at Brown University.

== Biography ==
Bashir obtained his BA from Amherst College, and his MA, MPhil and PhD from Yale University. His works are concerned with history and historiography, Persian poetry, Sufism and Shi'ism, messianic movements originating in Islamic contexts, and religious representations of corporeality. He is the associate editor of the journal History and Theory, the editor of the book series Islamic Humanities (University of California Press), and the coeditor of Islamicate Intellectual History (Brill) with Judith Pfeiffer and Heidrun Eichner.

== Works ==
- Fazlallah Astarababi and the Hurufis
- Messianic Hopes and Mystical Visions: The Nūrbakhshīya Between Medieval and Modern Islam
- Sufi Bodies: Religion and Society in Medieval Islam
- Dance as Third Space: Interreligious, Intercultural, and Interdisciplinary Debates on Dance and Religion(s)
