= Toward Nakba as a Legal Concept =

Law review article

- Author: Rabea Eghbariah
- Media type: article in a law review

Official website
- Columbia Law Review

Toward Nakba as a Legal Concept is a 2024 law review article by the Palestinian human rights lawyer Rabea Eghbariah in which the author proposes that the term Nakba (Arabic: نَكْبَة 'catastrophe') be adopted as a legal framework. The article identifies Zionism and the Nakba as mutually constitutive counterparts, analyzes the legal anatomy of the ongoing Nakba, and describes the foundational violence of the Nakba as displacement, its structure as fragmentation, and its purpose as the denial of self-determination for Palestinians.

The article was published by the Columbia Law Review (CLR) in June 2024 as an expanded version of an essay commissioned from Eghbariah in October 2023, edited, fact-checked, copy-edited, and approved for publication for the website of the Harvard Law Review (HLR), then blocked from publication in an unprecedented meeting of the journal body and emergency vote. That essay was published on November 21, 2023, in The Nation instead.

When the CLR published the expanded article, its faculty board of directors shut down the website, abdicating only when the majority of editors threatened to go on strike.

== Content ==
=== Thesis ===
In Toward Nakba as a Legal Concept, Eghbariah proposes that the term Nakba be adopted as a legal framework:

The law does not possess the language that we desperately need to accurately capture the totality of the Palestinian condition. From occupation to apartheid and genocide, the most commonly applied legal concepts rely on abstraction and analogy to reveal particular facets of subordination. This Article introduces Nakba as a legal concept to resolve this tension. Meaning “Catastrophe” in Arabic, the term “al-Nakba” (النكبة) is often used to refer to the ruinous process of establishing the State of Israel in Palestine. But the Nakba has undergone a metamorphosis; it has evolved from a historical calamity into a brutally sophisticated structure of oppression. This ongoing Nakba includes episodes of genocide and variants of apartheid but remains rooted in a historically and analytically distinct foundation, structure, and purpose.
This Article therefore proposes to distinguish apartheid, genocide, and Nakba as different, yet overlapping, modalities of crimes against humanity. It first identifies Zionism as Nakba’s ideological counterpart and insists on understanding these concepts as mutually constitutive. Considering the limits of existing legal frameworks, this Article goes on to analyze the legal anatomy of the ongoing Nakba. It positions displacement as the Nakba’s foundational violence, fragmentation as its structure, and the denial of self-determination as its purpose. Taken together, these elements give substance to a concept in the making that may prove useful in other contexts as well.

With Palestinians facing a fragmented legal landscape as a consequence of Israeli domination, with different legal regimes variegated by design, Eghbariah argues that the term Nakba, which has been used by Palestinians for decades, should be adopted as a unified legal framework to describe the conditions faced by Palestinians as a consequence of this fragmentation.

=== Structure ===
The 105-page article "Toward Nakba as a Legal Concept," in addition to an introduction and a conclusion, has three sections: Zionism as Nakba, Nakba and Its Legal Others, and Nakba as a Legal Concept.

== History ==
=== The Ongoing Nakba: Towards a Legal Framework for Palestine ===
==== Harvard Law Review ====
In October 2023, a week into Israel's assault on Gaza following the October 7 attacks, two editors of the Harvard Law Review reached out to Rabea Eghbariah, an SJD candidate at Harvard Law School, soliciting an essay from a Palestinian scholar for the website blog. Eghbariah accepted and submitted a 2,000-word draft in early November. In accordance with the HLR's standard process, the piece was solicited, commissioned, contracted, submitted, edited, fact-checked, copy-edited, and approved. Eghbariah's essay, entitled "The Ongoing Nakba: Towards a Legal Framework for Palestine"—which contextualized the Gaza genocide within the ongoing Nakba and concluded that "the denial of the genocide in Gaza is rooted in the denial of the Nakba"—would have been the HLR's first publication by a Palestinian scholar.

On November 7, 2023, HLR President Apsara Iyer met with Online Chairs Sabrina A. Ochoa and Tascha Shahriari-Parsa to speak about the November issue of the HLR blog, which was supposed to be published on November 10. Shortly before the essay was due to go live, Iyer intervened and delayed its publication.

On November 18, in a full-body meeting of the HLR, 63% chose in an anonymous vote to block the piece from being published. The Harvard Crimson reported that the meeting lasted around six hours and HLR editors said "much of the time consisted of arguments over the contents of the article — including debates about its merit as a work of scholarship as well as over whether it was antisemitic."

Online Chairs Tascha Shahriari-Parsa and Sabrina Ochoa said that they had never seen an essay subjected to this level of scrutiny at the HLR. Shahriari-Parsa could find no precedent for a piece ready for publication to have been pulled. According to Shahriari-Parsa, the decision to pull the essay from publication "revolved around concerns about editors who might oppose or be offended by the piece, as well as concerns that the piece might provoke a reaction from members of the public who might in turn harass, dox or otherwise attempt to intimidate our editors, staff and HLR leadership." The previous month, Harvard students associated with groups that signed on to the Joint Statement by Harvard Palestine Solidarity Groups had been targeted by pro-Israel organizations such as Accuracy in Media, which projected the students' names and images on billboard trucks labeling them "Harvard’s Leading Antisemites."

==== The Nation ====
The piece was published in The Nation on November 21 with the title "The Harvard Law Review Refused to Run This Piece About Genocide in Gaza." The same day, The Intercept published an investigation into the HLR's decision not to publish the piece, and the HLR issued a public note in defense of its editorial processes. The journal faced public backlash and became "embroiled in internal strife." Approximately 125 law professors—including legal scholars Duncan Kennedy, William Schabas, and Makau Mutua—signed an open letter in solidarity with Eghbariah and HLR editors, describing the censorship as “authoritarian” and expressing concern over the impact on academic freedom. Harvard Law School professor Ryan Doerfler praised the article for being “a forceful piece of legal scholarship.” Yale Law School professor Asli Bali described the article as an “excellent piece of legal scholarship.”

Over 25 dissenting HLR editors published an objection stating:

We are unaware of any other solicited piece that has been revoked by the Law Review in this way. This unprecedented decision threatens academic freedom and perpetuates the suppression of Palestinian voices.

Shahriari-Parsa published an opinion piece in The Nation criticizing the decision to revoke Eghbariah’s piece as “acquiescing to the Palestine exception to free speech.” In addition, two HLR editors resigned. In an author's note published to his Instagram, Eghbariah wrote:

It is fashionable these days to distract attention from the material reality of Palestinians by leveling claims of antisemitism or charging pro-Palestinian voices with supporting the killing of Israelis ... I reject succumbing to these false suspicions that are rooted in the racist assumption that Palestinians are innately hateful and violent ... The people of Gaza, who continued to be slaughtered for over 40 days, cannot afford these discursive distractions.

==== The Harbinger of the N.Y.U. Review of Law & Social Change ====
In December, The Harbinger of the N.Y.U. Review of Law & Social Change republished the full text of the essay pulled by the HLR "to offer the piece that standing it was denied in legal academia and amplify a necessary and astute analysis of the ongoing Israeli genocide of the Palestinian people, from 1948 to today."

=== Toward Nakba as a Legal Concept in the Columbia Law Review ===
The Columbia Law Review (CLR) commissioned an expanded version of the 2,000-word essay Eghbariah had originally written for the HLR in the fall of 2023. Eghbariah worked with editors—30 CLR staffers—on the piece over five months. The final text, Toward Nakba as a Legal Concept, was 105 pages long.

The Intercept reported that, according to CLR editors working on the article, "members of the board of directors pressured the law review’s leadership to delay and even rescind publication" over the weekend of June 1–2. The CLR's board of directors—made up of notable judges, lawyers, and legal scholars including Gillian Lester, Dean of Columbia Law School; Gillian E. Metzger, of the Justice Department’s Office of Legal Counsel; and Lewis Yelin, of the Department of Justice's senior counsel—rarely intervened in the CLR's editorial content, which is the purview of its editors, students at Columbia Law School.

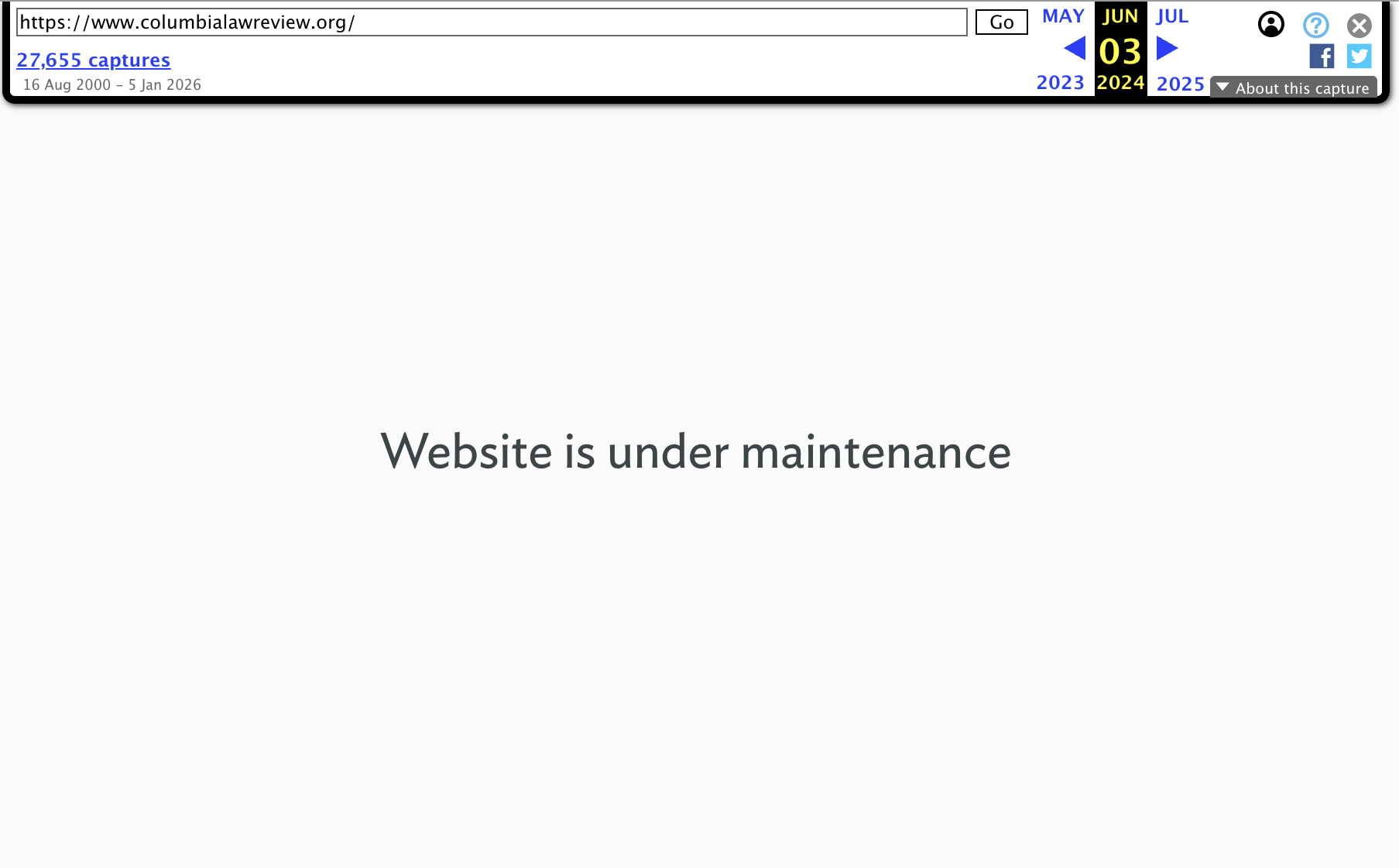
Screenshot of an archived version of the official Columbia Law Review website from June 2024, showing the text "Website is under maintenance." The CLR board of directors took down the entire website hours after the publication of Eghbariah's Toward Nakba as a Legal Concept.

Refusing the request and concerned that the piece had been leaked, the CLR editors published the full May volume of the CLR online in the early hours of June 3, seeking to preempt outside pressure against publishing the piece. Hours after its publication, and after editors rejected the board of directors's request that the article be taken down, the board of directors shut down the CLR's website, which then read "Website under maintenance." On Tuesday June 4, the board of directors proposed a deal in which the website would be restored if a disclaimer were appended to the article including the text:

Toward Nakba as a Legal Concept was not subject to the usual processes of review and editing at the Law Review. It was solicited outside of the usual articles selection process and edited and substantiated by a limited number of student editors. Contrary to ordinary practice, it was not made available for all student editors to read. As a result, a number of student editors were unaware of the piece and did not have the usual opportunity to provide input on its content prior to its publication.

Eghbariah stated in an interview with Amy Goodman on Democracy Now! that, as of June 5, the board of directors of the CLR had not reached out to him to explain their decision. Eghbariah described the repression faced by his piece as "a testament to the Palestine exception to free speech and to academic freedom" and "a microcosm of the broader authoritarian repression we've been witnessing on American campuses."

On Thursday June 6, the board of directors reactivated the website with the above disclaimer placed on Eghbariah's article. The editors rejected this disclaimer and a 20-5 majority of editors voted to go on strike demanding its removal. The CLR's board of directors then restored the site.

== Reception ==
Writing in the London International Law Review in 2025, Fatima Ahdash, an assistant professor of law at Hamad Bin Khalifa University, Qatar, and Safaa Jaber, a doctoral student, described it as a "likely-to-become seminal work."

== See also ==
- Nakba Law
- Arsen Ostrovsky
- The Holocaust and the Nakba
