= Rabea Eghbariah =

Palestinian lawyer and academic

- ربيع إغبارية
- Born: Haifa, Israel
- Occupations: Lawyer and scholar

Academic background
- Education: University of Haifa (B.Sc.); Tel Aviv University (LL.B.); Harvard Law School (LL.M.)

Academic work
- Discipline: Law
- Sub-discipline: Human Rights
- Institutions: Harvard Law School

Rabea Eghbariah (Arabic: ربيع إغبارية) is a Palestinian human rights lawyer and legal scholar. He is currently completing his S.J.D. at Harvard Law School, where he focuses on the socio-legal aspects of the Israeli-Palestinian conflict.

Eghbariah’s work has gained international attention for his proposal to recognize the Nakba as a legal concept within international legal frameworks, similar to how terms like apartheid and genocide are treated. His scholarship triggered academic and public debate, with controversy surrounding the censorship of his writings by the Harvard Law Review and Columbia Law Review.

== Education ==
Eghbariah earned his B.Sc. from the University of Haifa in 2012. He then attended Tel Aviv University, where he earned an LL.B. in 2015. He later completed an LL.M. at Harvard Law School in 2020, receiving the Irving Oberman Memorial Prize in Legal History.

Eghbariah is completing his S.J.D. at Harvard Law School, under the supervision of scholars such as Noah Feldman and Rashid Khalidi. Feldman described Eghbariah as “one of the most brilliant students I’ve taught in 20 years as a law professor,” while Khalidi praised his research for providing “an entirely original and very intelligent analysis.”

== Career ==
Eghbariah began his legal career as an appellate public defender before joining the Adalah Legal Center, where he argued cases relating to Palestinian rights. At Adalah, he represented Palestinian Clients from Gaza, the West Bank, Jerusalem, and Israel.

His work included challenging Israel's Cyber Unit, a secretive arm of the Israeli government that collaborates with tech companies to remove online content, often targeting Palestinian social media posts. In 2022, Eghbariah argued before the Israeli Supreme Court that the Israeli family reunification law “creates two separate legal tracks, based on ethno-national identity; one, mainly for Jewish-Israeli citizens and the other for Palestinian citizens and residents of the state who wish to unite with their spouses who live in the Occupied West Bank,” adding that Israel’s ban on Palestinian family unification would not have passed in Apartheid South Africa. In October 2023, Israeli airstrikes killed 12 members of the Nabaheen family in Gaza whom Eghbariah represented.

In collaboration with artist Jumana Manna, Eghbariah co-scripted the 2022 film Foragers, which explores Israels criminalization of foraging wild herbs such as za'atar and akkoub. The film drew on his work, which challenged Israel's use of nature protection laws as a tool of control over Palestinian land and resources. The film received acclaim.

== Nakba articles and censorship ==
Eghbariah's May 2024 Columbia Law Review article "Toward Nakba as a Legal Concept" argues for the adoption of the term Nakba—describing the Palestinian experience of Zionism, including the ongoing process of displacement, fragmentation, and denial of self-determination—as a legal framework. His thesis argues that the ongoing Nakba should be classified similarly to other internationally recognized crimes against humanity such as apartheid or genocide.

=== Harvard Law Review essay ===
Eghbariah originally formulated this concept in a 2,000-word essay solicited by the online chairs of the Harvard Law Review a week into Israel's assault on Gaza in October 2023 and meant to be published by on the HLR website in November. The essay, “The Ongoing Nakba: Toward a Legal Framework for Palestine” was subject to the HLR's standard procedure for articles, including commission, contracting, submission, rigorous editing, fact-checking, and approval by relevant editors for publication, but it was blocked from publication shortly before it was due to go live on November 10 in an unprecedented intervention from the Harvard Law Review president, Apsara Iyer. On November 18, an emergency full-body meeting of over 100 HLR editors was convened, and after six hours, 63% voted anonymously against publication.

On November 21, the essay was then published in full in The Nation. The same day, The Intercept published an investigation into the essay's cancellation at the HLR, and the HLR issued a public note in defense of its editorial processes. The HLR faced public backlash and the journal became "embroiled in internal strife."

Over 25 editors issued a dissenting statement. Over 100 law professors, including legal scholars Duncan Kennedy, William Schabas, and Makau Mutua, signed an open letter describing the censorship as “authoritarian” and expressing concern over the impact on academic freedom. Harvard Law School professor Ryan Doerfler praised the article for being “a forceful piece of legal scholarship.” Yale Law School professor Asli Bali described the article as an “excellent piece of legal scholarship.” One Harvard Law Review editor published an opinion piece criticizing the decision to revoke Eghbariah’s piece as “acquiescing to the Palestine exception to free speech.”

In one of his responses to the Harvard Law Review editors, Eghbariah wrote, “This is discrimination. Let’s not dance around it — this is also outright censorship. It is dangerous and alarming."

=== Columbia Law Review article ===
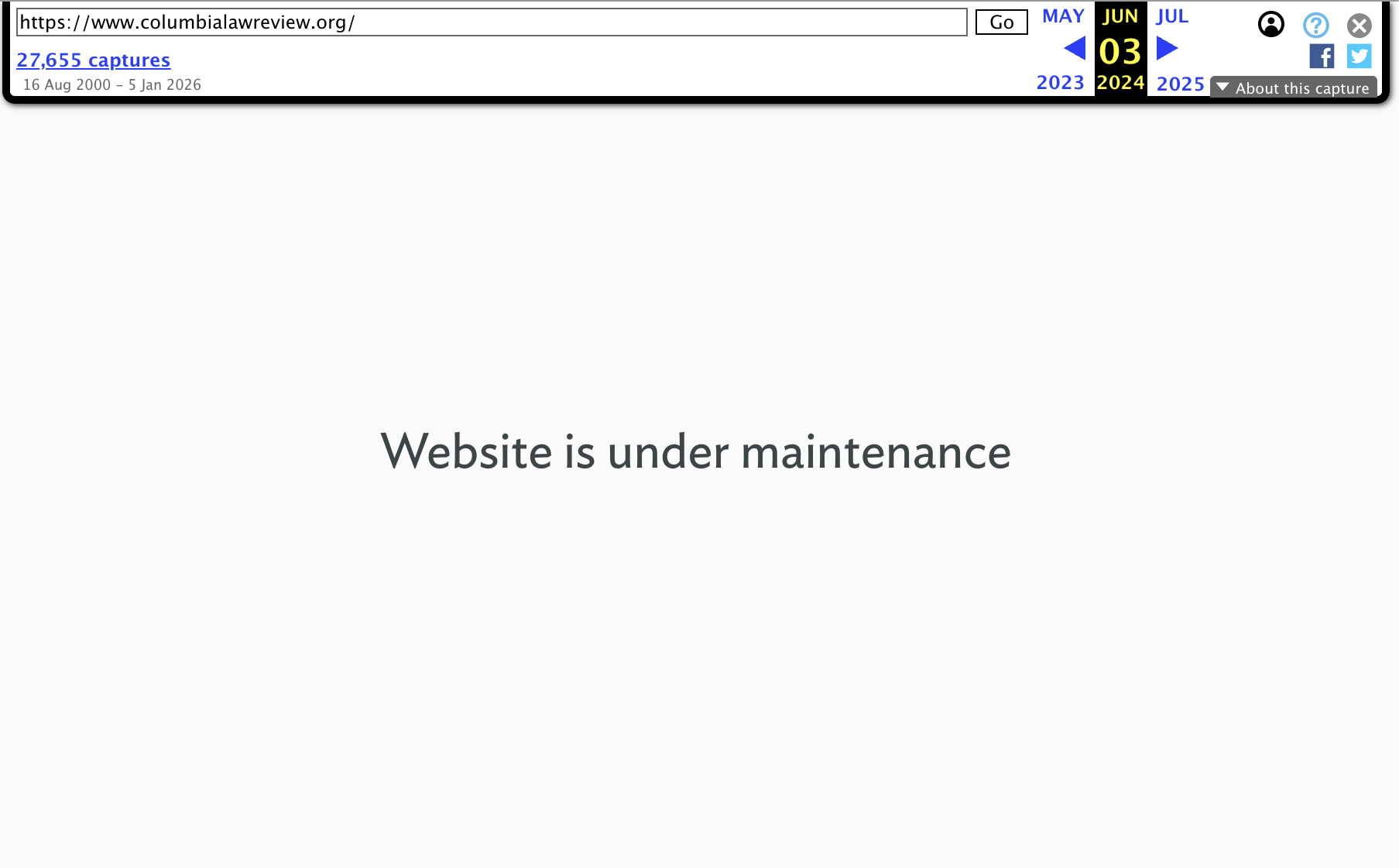
Screenshot of an archived version of the official Columbia Law Review website from June 2024, showing the text "Website is under maintenance." The CLR board of directors took down the entire website hours after the publication of Eghbariah's Toward Nakba as a Legal Concept.

Following Harvard Law Review's decision to not publish Eghbariah’s essay, the Columbia Law Review commissioned Eghbariah to write an expanded version to be published with the Review. In June 2024, the article, now over a hundred pages long, titled “Toward Nakba as a Legal Concept,” was published on the CLR website. Following its publication, the Columbia Law Review Board of Directors shut down the Law Review's website to prevent access to Eghbariah’s article, citing “deviation from the Review’s usual processes.”

The suspension of the website sparked another controversy, leading several Columbia professors to openly criticize the decision. Editors at both the Harvard Law Review and Columbia Law Review wrote that “important procedural conventions that protect academic freedom were breached to silence Eghbariah [in both instances].”

The article was ultimately restored following a strike by the Columbia Law Review editors. Eghbariah became the first Palestinian to publish with the Columbia Law Review. In response to the decision to suspend the website, Eghbariah stated that he saw the decision as “a microcosm of a broader authoritarian repression taking place across U.S. campuses” and that “there is a continuum between the material reality in Gaza and shutting down these debates.”
