= E. Allan Farnsworth =

American legal scholar

Edward Allan Farnsworth (June 30, 1928 – January 31, 2005) was one of America's most renowned legal scholars on contracts. His writings were standard reference in courtrooms and law schools.

== Biography ==
Born in Providence, Rhode Island, he received a bachelor's degree in applied mathematics from the University of Michigan in 1948 and a master's degree in physics from Yale University in 1949. He earned his law degree from Columbia Law School in 1952. After serving in the U.S. Air Force JAG and briefly working in private practice, he began teaching at Columbia Law. Starting his career as the school's youngest professor, Farnsworth taught for over 50 years.

A leading scholar, Farnsworth invested ten years as reporter for the influential 1981 Restatement (Second) of Contracts stabilizing a fluid area of American law. His "Farnsworth on Contracts" is among the most heavily referenced texts on contract law.

Farnsworth was elected to the American Philosophical Society in 1994.

In January 2005, Prof. Farnsworth died in Englewood, New Jersey, aged 76.

== Bibliography ==
- Farnsworth, E. Allan (1998). Changing Your Mind: The Law of Regretted Decisions. New Haven, CT: Yale University Press. ISBN 978-0300073058.
- Farnsworth, E. Allan (1999). An Introduction to the Legal System of the United States, 3rd Edition. New York, NY: Oxford University Press. ISBN 978-0379213737.
- Farnsworth, E. Allan (2004). Alleviating Mistakes: Reversal and Forgiveness for Flawed Perceptions. New York, NY: Oxford University Press. ISBN 978-0199276110.
