= Harvard Law Review =

- Discipline: Law
- Language: English

Publication details
- History: 1887–present
- Publisher: The Harvard Law Review Association (United States)
- Frequency: 8/year
- Impact factor: 4.680 (2018)

Standard abbreviations
- Bluebook: Harv. L. Rev.
- ISO 4: Harv. Law Rev.

Indexing
- CODEN: HALRAF
- ISSN: 0017-811X
- LCCN: 12032979
- OCLC no.: 46968396

Links
- Journal homepage

The Harvard Law Review is a law review published by an independent student group at Harvard Law School. According to the Journal Citation Reports, the Harvard Law Review's 2015 impact factor of 4.979 placed the journal first out of 143 journals in the category "Law". It also ranks first in other ranking systems of law reviews. It is published monthly from November through June, with the November issue dedicated to covering the previous year's term of the Supreme Court of the United States.

The journal also publishes the online-only Harvard Law Review Forum, a rolling journal of scholarly responses to the main journal's content. The law review is one of three honors societies at the law school, along with the Harvard Legal Aid Bureau and the Board of Student Advisors. Students who are selected for more than one of these three organizations may only join one.

The Harvard Law Review Association—in conjunction with the Columbia Law Review, the University of Pennsylvania Law Review, and the Yale Law Journal—publishes The Bluebook, the primary guide for legal citation formats in the United States.

== History ==
Volume 1 of the Harvard Law Review (1887–1888)

The Harvard Law Review published its first issue on April 15, 1887, making it one of the oldest operating student-edited law reviews in the United States. The establishment of the journal was largely due to the support of Louis Brandeis, then a recent Harvard Law School alumnus and Boston attorney who would later go on to become a Justice of the Supreme Court of the United States.

From the 1880s to the 1970s, editors were selected based on their grades; the president of the Review was the student with the highest academic rank. The first female editor of the journal was Priscilla Holmes (1953–1955, Volumes 67–68); the first woman to serve as the journal's president was Susan Estrich (1977), who later was active in Democratic Party politics and became the youngest woman to receive tenure at Harvard Law School; its first non-white ethnic minority president was Raj Marphatia (1988, Volume 101), who is now a partner at the Boston law firm of Ropes & Gray; its first African-American president was the 44th President of the United States Barack Obama (1991); its first openly gay president was Mitchell Reich (2011); its first Latino president was Andrew M. Crespo, who is now tenured as a professor at Harvard Law School. The first female African-American president, ImeIme Umana, was elected in 2017.

Gannett House, a white building constructed in the Greek Revival style that was popular in New England during the mid-to-late 19th century, has been home to the Harvard Law Review since the 1920s. Before moving into Gannett House, the journal resided in the Law School's Austin Hall.

Since the change in criteria in the 1970s, grades are no longer the primary basis for selecting editors. Membership in the Harvard Law Review is offered to select Harvard law students based on first-year grades and performance in a writing competition held at the end of the first year, except for twelve slots that are offered on a discretionary basis. The writing competition includes two components: an edit of an unpublished article and an analysis of a recent United States Supreme Court or Court of Appeals case. The writing competition submissions are graded blindly to assure anonymity. Fourteen editors (two from each 1L section) are selected based on a combination of their first-year grades and their competition scores. Twenty editors are selected based solely on their competition scores. The remaining twelve editors are selected on a discretionary basis. According to the law review's webpage, "Some of these discretionary slots may be used to implement the Review's affirmative action policy." The president of the Harvard Law Review is elected by the other editors.

It has been a long tradition since the first issue that the works of students published in the Harvard Law Review are called "notes" and they are unsigned as part of a policy reflecting "the fact that many members of the Review besides the author contribute to each published piece."

In 2012, Harvard Law Review had 1,722 paid subscriptions.

In November 2023, the Harvard Law Review stopped the publication of "The Ongoing Nakba: Towards a Legal Framework for Palestine," a short commissioned essay written by Rabea Eghbariah, a Palestinian student at Harvard Law. The online chairs of the Law Review had asked the Eghbariah to write a blog post. The Intercept reported that the president of the Law Review, Apsara Iyer, with the support of a majority of the Law Review leadership, delayed the publication of the essay because of "safety concerns and the desire to deliberate with editors." The Law Review ultimately did not publish the blog post. It was later published in The Nation in November and The Harbinger of the N.Y.U. Review of Law & Social Change in December. 25 Law Review editors published an objection criticizing the decision not to publish the article after it had passed through the standard editorial process, calling it an "unprecedented decision [that] threatens academic freedom and perpetuates the suppression of Palestinian voices." The following spring, Eghbariah's essay was expanded and published as a full law review article entitled "Toward Nakba as a Legal Concept" in the Columbia Law Review, where there were also administrative attempts to suppress the piece, ultimately overcome.

== Alumni ==
=== President of the United States ===
Barack Obama

- Barack Obama, served as president of volume 104.

=== Supreme Court Justices ===
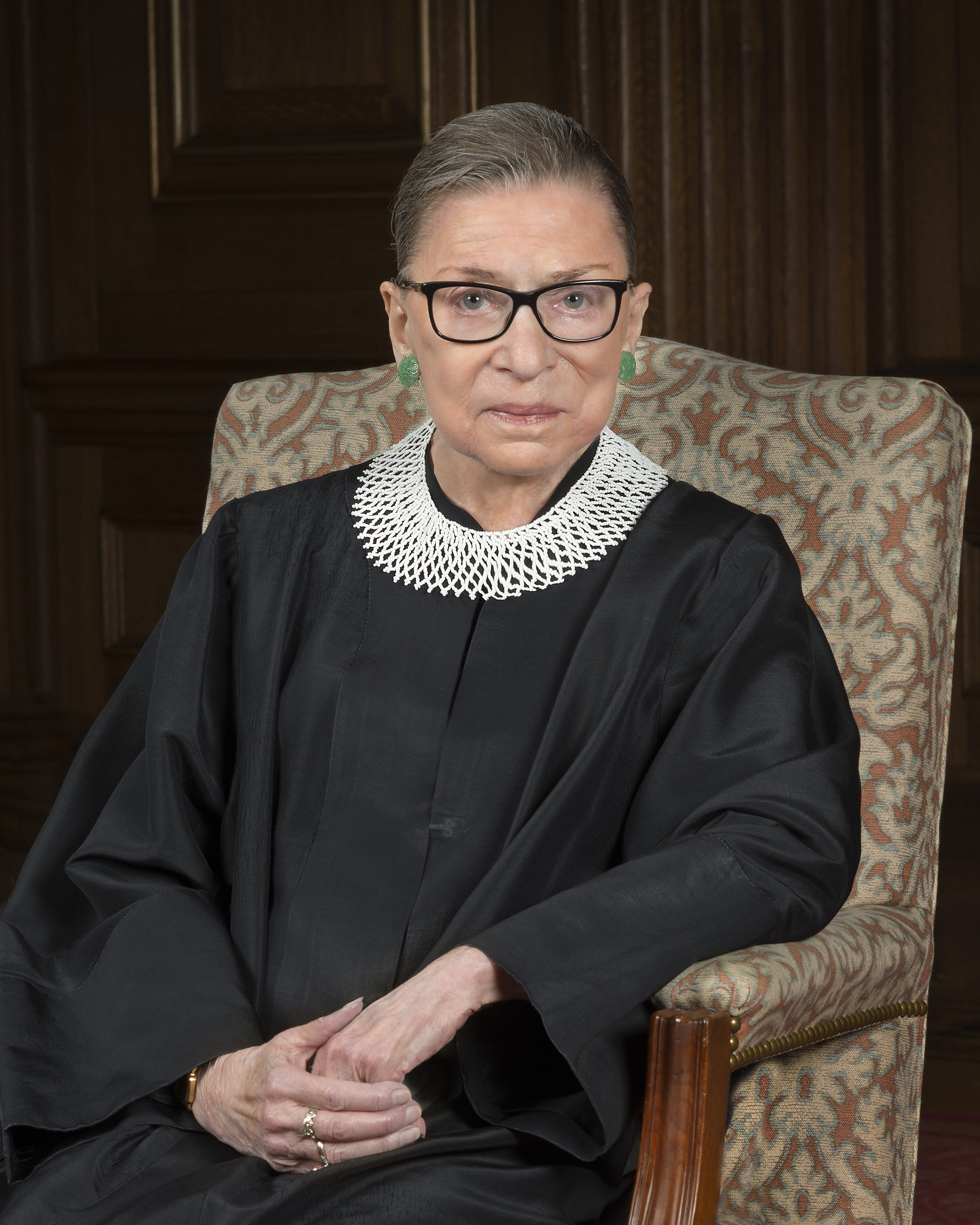
Ruth Bader Ginsburg

- Stephen Breyer, served as articles editor of volume 77.
- Felix Frankfurter.
- Ruth Bader Ginsburg, served as editor for one year before transferring to Columbia Law School.
- Ketanji Brown Jackson, served as supervising editor of volume 109.
- Elena Kagan, served as supervising editor of volume 99.
- John G. Roberts Jr., served as managing editor for volume 92.
- Antonin Scalia, served as notes editor for volume 73.
- Edward Sanford.

=== Other jurists ===
- David J. Barron, judge of the United States Court of Appeals for the First Circuit, served as articles editor.
- Andrew L. Brasher, judge of the United States Court of Appeals for the Eleventh Circuit.
- Michael Boudin, judge of the United States Court of Appeals for the First Circuit, served as president of volume 77.
- Henry Friendly, late judge of the United States Court of Appeals for the Second Circuit, served as president.
- Learned Hand, late judge of the United States Court of Appeals for the Second Circuit, served as an editor but later resigned.
- Harris Hartz, judge of the United States Court of Appeals for the Tenth Circuit, served as case and developments editor.
- Gregory G. Katsas, judge of the United States Court of Appeals for the District of Columbia Circuit, executive editor of volume 102.
- William Kayatta, judge of the United States Court of Appeals for the First Circuit.
- Pierre Leval, judge of the United States Court of Appeals for the Second Circuit, served as notes editor.
- Debra Ann Livingston, judge of the United States Court of Appeals for the Second Circuit.
- James Kenneth Logan, judge of the United States Court of Appeals for the Tenth Circuit.
- Kevin C. Newsom, judge of the United States Court of Appeals for the Eleventh Circuit, articles editor of volume 110.
- James L. Oakes, late judge of the United States Court of Appeals for the Second Circuit.
- Nina Pillard, judge of the United States Court of Appeals for the District of Columbia Circuit.
- Richard Posner, judge of the United States Court of Appeals for the Seventh Circuit, served as president of volume 75.
- Lawrence VanDyke, judge of the United States Court of Appeals for the Ninth Circuit.

=== Cabinet secretaries ===
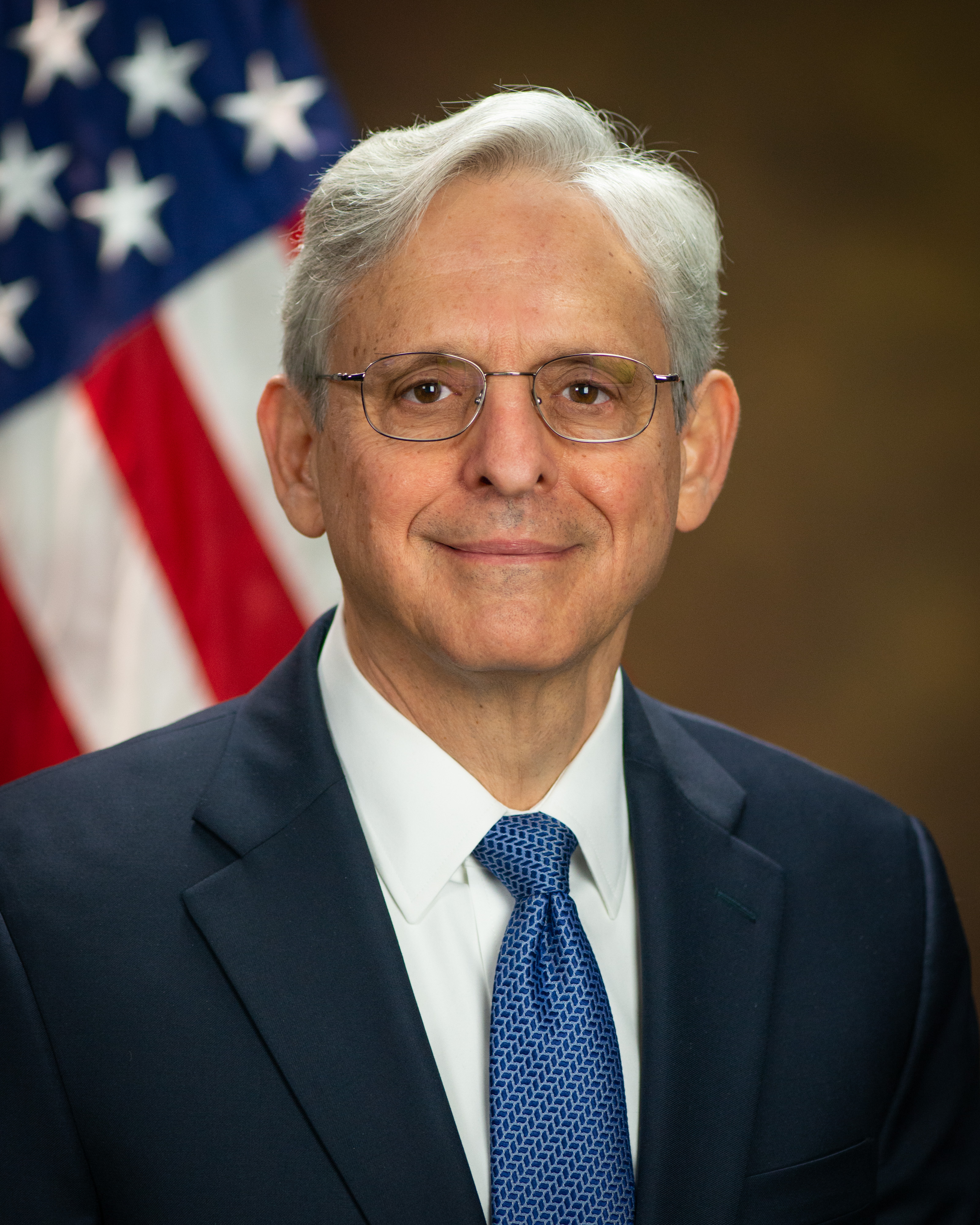
Merrick Garland

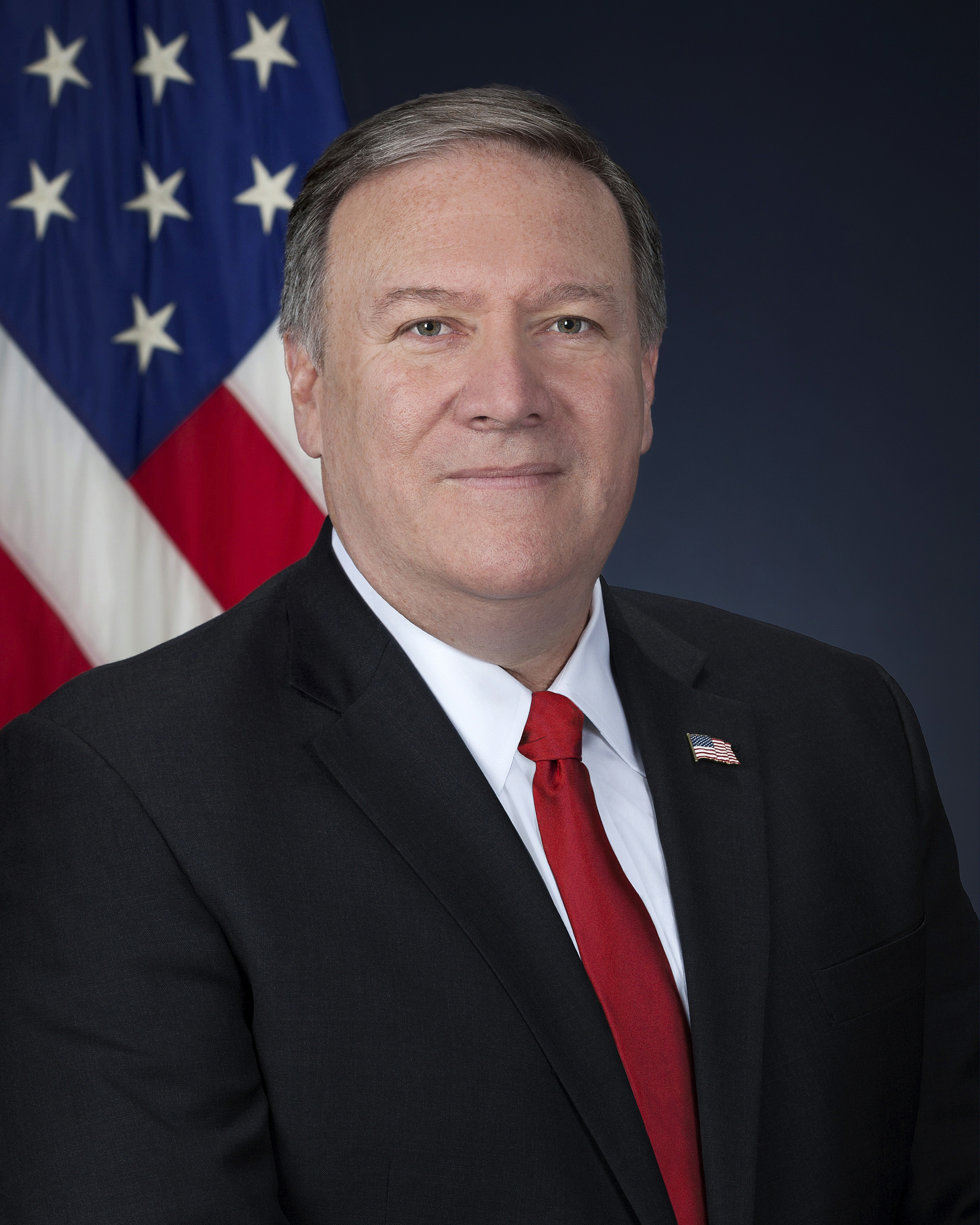
Mike Pompeo

- Dean Acheson, Secretary of State.
- Michael Chertoff, Secretary of Homeland Security and former judge on United States Court of Appeals for the Third Circuit.
- William Coleman Jr., Secretary of Transportation, Brown v. Board of Education attorney, and first African-American Supreme Court clerk.
- Merrick Garland, 86th United States Attorney General; Judge of the United States Court of Appeals for the District of Columbia Circuit, served as articles editor.
- Mike Pompeo, former US Secretary of State.
- Elliot Richardson, Attorney General, Secretary of Health, Education, and Welfare, Secretary of Defense, Secretary of Commerce, served as president (1947).

=== Other U.S. government officials ===
- Paul Clement, former U.S. Solicitor General, served as Supreme Court editor.
- Archibald Cox, U.S. Solicitor General.
- Christopher Cox, former chairman of U.S. Securities and Exchange Commission.
- Ted Cruz, U.S. Senator from Texas.
- Viet Dinh, former Assistant Attorney General, served as Bluebook editor.
- Charles Evans Hughes Jr., former U.S. Solicitor General.
- Michael Froman, U.S. Trade Representative, 2013–2017.
- Julius Genachowski, former chairman of the Federal Communications Commission.
- Ian Gershengorn, former acting U.S. Solicitor General.
- Danielle Gray, former Cabinet Secretary.
- Erwin N. Griswold, a dean of the Harvard Law School and Solicitor General under presidents Lyndon B. Johnson and Richard M. Nixon.
- Alger Hiss, former U.S. State Department official and alleged spy.
- Ron Klain, Chief of staff to Vice Presidents Al Gore and Joe Biden, Chief of Staff to the 46th president of the United States Joe Biden.
- Saritha Komatireddy (born 1984 or 1985), federal prosecutor and former chief of staff of the U.S. Drug Enforcement Administration, Republican nominee for attorney general of New York in the 2026 election.
- Christopher Landau, former United States Ambassador to Mexico, served as articles editor.
- Michael Leiter, former Director of the U.S. National Counterterrorism Center, president of volume 113.
- David S. Mann, former U.S. Representative from Ohio, served as editor.
- Mark S. Martins, Brigadier General in the United States Army Judge Advocate General's Corps, Chief Prosecutor of Military Commissions.
- Bernard Nussbaum, former White House Counsel, served as notes editor.
- F. Whitten Peters, former Secretary of the Air Force, served as president.
- Edith Ramirez, chairwoman of the Federal Trade Commission.
- Rod Rosenstein, U.S. Deputy Attorney General.
- Jamie Raskin, U.S. Representative from Maryland.
- Robert A. Taft, U.S. Senator from Ohio.
- Barry B. White, United States Ambassador to Norway, 2009–2013.
- Robert L. Deitz, former General Counsel for the National Security Agency and Senior Counsel to the Director of the Central Intelligence Agency, served as notes editor and Supreme Court Note.

=== Other government officials ===
- Preeta D. Bansal, former New York State Solicitor General, served as supervising editor.
- Allan Gotlieb, former Canadian Ambassador to the United States.
- Eliot Spitzer, former Governor of New York.
- Robert Stanfield, former Premier of the Province of Nova Scotia, and former leader of Canada's Official Opposition. He was the Review's first Canadian editor in the late 1930s.

=== Academics ===
- Stephen Barnett, legal scholar at University of California, Berkeley School of Law who opposed the Newspaper Preservation Act of 1970.
- Alexander Bickel, late professor at Yale Law School.
- Derek Bok, former president of Harvard University.
- Kingman Brewster, former president of Yale University, served as treasurer.
- Amy Chua, professor at Yale Law School, served as executive editor.
- Stephen J. Friedman, president of Pace University.
- John H. Garvey, president of The Catholic University of America.
- I. Glenn Cohen, professor at Harvard Law School.
- Annette Gordon-Reed, professor at Harvard Law School and winner of the Pulitzer Prize for History.
- Robert A. Gorman (born 1937), law professor at the University of Pennsylvania Law School.
- Charles Hamilton Houston, former Dean of Howard University Law School and NAACP Litigation Director.
- Wesley Newcomb Hohfeld, professor at Yale Law School.
- John Honnold (1915–2011), law professor at the University of Pennsylvania Law School.
- Harold Koh, former Dean of Yale Law School.
- David Leebron, president of Rice University, served as president.
- Lance Liebman, former Dean of Columbia Law School, served as president.
- Kenneth Mack, professor and historian at Harvard Law School.
- William C. Powers, former president of University of Texas, served as managing editor.
- Jeannie Suk Gersen, professor at Harvard Law School.
- Matthew Stephenson, professor at Harvard Law School.
- Stephen Schulhofer (born 1942), professor of law at the University of Pennsylvania Law School and NYU Law School.
- John Sexton, former president of New York University.
- James Vorenberg, former dean of Harvard Law School, served as president.
- Michael K. Young, president of Texas A&M University.
- Michael A. Simons, dean of St. John's University School of Law

=== Other attorneys ===
- Bennett Boskey, law clerk to Judge Learned Hand and two U.S. Supreme Court justices.
- Joe Flom, noted M&A attorney and name partner at Skadden, Arps, Slate, Meagher & Flom.
- John B. Quinn, founder and name partner of Quinn Emanuel Urquhart & Sullivan.
- Kenneth Chesebro, participant in the January 6 United States Capitol attack, indicted by the state of Georgia in the scheme to alter results of the 2020 election for US president, the Trump fake electors plot.
- Andrew Schlafly, founder of Conservapedia.
- Hagan Scotten, former Assistant U.S. Attorney for the Southern District of New York

=== Writers and journalists ===
- Phil Graham, former publisher of The Washington Post.
- Archibald MacLeish, Pulitzer Prize-winning poet.
- Cliff Sloan, former publisher of Slate.
- Jeffrey Toobin, print and broadcast journalist.

=== Other alumni ===
- David Bonderman, co-founder of private equity firm TPG Capital.
- Norman Dorsen, former American Civil Liberties Union president.
- Jeff Kindler, former CEO of Pfizer.
- Alfred Lee Loomis, financier, scientist, and inventor.
- Rob Manfred, commissioner of Major League Baseball, served as articles editor.
- Adebayo Ogunlesi, chairman and managing partner of Global Infrastructure Partners.
- Nadine Strossen, former American Civil Liberties Union president.

== See also ==
- Harvard Law Record
- Hart–Fuller debate
