= Palestine Legal =

U.S. advocacy group for Palestinian rights

- Founder: Dima Khalidi
- Type: Advocacy group
- Headquarters: Chicago, Illinois, U.S.
- Affiliations: Tides Foundation
- Website: palestinelegal.org

Palestine Legal is an advocacy group focused on defending people who support Palestinian rights. The group is headquartered in Chicago, Illinois. Its founder and director is Dima Khalidi, a Palestinian born in Beirut and raised in the US.

== Activity ==
In 2015, Palestine Legal published a report with the Center for Constitutional Rights about what the two organizations described as "the Palestine exception to free speech." During the first four months of 2015, the organization reported responding to 102 requests from university students and faculty for legal aid, most of them involving accusations of support for terrorism and antisemitism.

In 2019, Palestine Legal lawyers reported responding to more than 180 attempts to suppress the speech of students and academics supporting Palestinian rights.

In May 2021, Truthout reported that Palestine Legal had been tracking bills that would harm advocacy for Palestinian rights since 2014.

In response to the 2023 October 7 attacks, Dylan Saba, an attorney with Palestine Legal, said "Glory to the resistance and the people of Palestine". Saba was described by The Forward as part of a small segment of the Jewish left that supported the Hamas attack.
