= Apsara Iyer =

American legal scholar and art crime investigator

- Born: Chicago, Illinois, US
- Education: Yale University, University of Oxford
- Alma mater: Phillips Academy
- Occupation: Art crime investigator
- Employer(s): New York County District Attorney's office, Maastricht University
- Awards: Clarendon Fund scholarship

Apsara Iyer is an American art crime investigator and the 137th president of the Harvard Law Review. She is the first Indian American woman to be elected to that position.

== Early life and education ==
Iyer was born in Chicago and raised in West Lafayette, Indiana. She attended Phillips Academy in Andover, Massachusetts, and then Yale University, where she received a bachelor's in Spanish and in economics and math. In 2012, she was a finalist for a Rhodes Scholarship. She was awarded the Clarendon Fund scholarship to pursue graduate studies at University of Oxford, where she received an MPhil in economics.

== Career ==
=== Work to counter antiquities trafficking and art crime ===
In 2018, Iyer joined the Antiquities Trafficking Unit within the New York County District Attorney's office, working with Matthew Bogdanos on major cases related to art crime, the illicit antiquities trade, and looted art. She has been instrumental in the return of numerous looted, stolen, and trafficked cultural objects to their countries of origin. She has been involved in the repatriation of cultural property to 15 different countries, amounting to the return of over 1,100 stolen cultural objects.

In 2021, Iyer spent a summer working with Donna Yates at Maastricht University, researching the application of statutes of limitations in cultural property cases as a Chayes International Public Service Fellow.

Prior to this, she was a volunteer researcher in the Trafficking Culture research consortium and at the University of Pennsylvania's Penn Cultural Heritage Center.

=== Harvard Law Review Palestinian genocide article controversy ===
Two weeks into the Gaza war, the online chairs of the Harvard Law Review solicited an essay for the HLR's online blog from the Palestinian human rights lawyer and Harvard doctoral candidate Rabea Eghbariah. Eghbariah's essay, titled "The Ongoing Nakba: Towards a Legal Framework for Palestine", stated that "the atrocities in Gaza amount to genocide" and that "the distinctive nature of the domination Palestinians have faced should demand a new category of crime: 'Nakba'." After the essay had gone through the regular editorial process, including editing, fact-checking, and initial approval, Iyer intervened to stop its publication, citing safety concerns. After this, an emergency meeting of 100 editors of the Harvard Law Review was called and an anonymous vote was held, in which 63% of editors voted against publication. According to Tascha Shahriari-Parsa, one of the online chairs of the HLR, the decision to pull the essay from publication "revolved around concerns about editors who might oppose or be offended by the piece, as well as concerns that the piece might provoke a reaction from members of the public who might in turn harass, dox or otherwise attempt to intimidate our editors, staff and HLR leadership." The decision to pull the piece, which would have been the HLR's first publication by a Palestinian scholar, generated public controversy among editors and others.

== Personal life ==
Iyer speaks English, Hindi, and Tamil.
