= Ongoing Nakba =

Term for the ongoing trauma of the Palestinian people

"Ongoing Nakba" (Arabic: النکبة المستمرة, romanized: an-Nakba al-mustamirra) is a historiographical framework and term that interprets the Palestinian Nakba ("Catastrophe") as a still emerging and unfolding phenomenon. The phrase emerged in the late 1990s and its first public usage is widely credited to Hanan Ashrawi, who referred to it in a speech at the 2001 World Conference against Racism. The term was later adopted by scholars such as Joseph Massad and Elias Khoury. As an intellectual framework, the "ongoing Nakba" narrative reflects the conceptualisation of the Palestinian experience not as a series of isolated events, but as "a continuous experience of violence and dispossession", or as other have termed it, the "recurring loss" (Arabic: الفقدان المتكرر, romanized: al-fuqdān al-mutakarrir) of the Palestinian people.

== Conceptual emergence ==
The phrase "ongoing Nakba" (Arabic: النکبة المستمرة, romanized: al-nakba al-mustamirra) emerged conceptually in the late 1990s and early 2000 as part of the narrative framework for expressing the "sense of stagnant and suspended historicity" in the Palestinian experience of dispossession over the past century.

Contributing factors to the precipitation of this narrative included the Palestine Liberation Organization (PLO)'s "shift from anti-colonial resistance to statecraft", as well as the failure of the 1993 Oslo Accords to realize an independent Palestinian state. It was also a response to the normalization of the violence inflicted on Palestinians, both within Israel and in the West Bank.

The first usage of the term "ongoing Nakba" is typically credited to the Palestinian scholar, activist and politician Hanan Ashrawi in her speech at the 2001 UN World Conference Against Racism, Racial Discrimination, Xenophobia, and Related Intolerances. In it, Ashrawi referred to the Palestinian people as "a nation in captivity held hostage to an ongoing Nakba, as the most intricate and pervasive expression of persistent colonialism, apartheid, racism, and victimization".

The term then saw sporadic usage in English and Arabic up until 2008, when Joseph Massad outlined the concept in greater detail in an article in al-Ahram Weekly in 2008, defining the Nakba as an ongoing process rather than a 1948 event.

Elias Khoury reiterated this in a 2012 article in both Arabic and English, presenting the "al-Nakba al-Mustamirra" or "continuous Nakba" as both "a regime of material violence" and "ongoing battle of interpretation, a system aimed at silencing and erasing the Palestinian story by relegating it to the past".

Shir Alon describes the "ongoing Nakba" as "a means of understanding the Palestinian historical present" that "reconfigures the meaning of the 1948 expulsion: rather than a traumatic rupture ushering in a new period, it posits the Nakba as an ongoing process ... a continuous experience of violence and dispossession."

As a framework it is "a relatively recent historiographic narrative through which to comprehend decades of Zionist settler colonialism and Palestinian dispossession", that, according to Alon, replaces both the Nakba and the subsequent Naksa (the 1967 "setback", or further displacement) narrative, and the anti-imperialist liberation struggle.

As an emergent paradigm, the sense of "ongoing Nakba" is also coterminous with what Esmail Nashif has identified as al-fuqdan al-mutakarrir (Arabic: الفقدان المتكرر; literally: the recurring loss) of the Palestinians.

Ilan Pappé references the term in the conclusion to his essay Everyday Evil in Palestine: The View from Lucifer's Hill, which examines daily occurrences of "incremental colonization, ethnic cleansing, and oppression" in Palestine from the perspective of events at Masafer Yatta. He notes that this "ongoing catastrophe of the Palestinians" is today also quite often referred to by Palestinian people themselves as the "ongoing Nakba".

== Narrative embodiments ==
One of the key ways in which the Nakba is understood to be an ongoing and continuing process of dispossession is in the continuation of "Zionist settler colonial violence" to this day, seventy years after the violence that originally drove hundreds of thousands of Palestinians from their land.

Rana Barakat asks what it means for the Arab villages that were destroyed in 1948 yet live on in the memories created among the displaced by that same destructive process – one that is ongoing. She notes that with the Nakba, the symbolic value of a "lost past" became not only a settler narrative, but one that now frames the Palestinian experience.

Barakat gives the example of the village of Lifta, a depopulated Arab village neither destroyed nor repopulated since 1948, as one that embodies both past and present narratives, noting: "Lifta is not only a static symbol of the settler desire to come to terms with the past but also an active symbol for Palestinians who survived (or did not survive) this unending past—the ongoing Nakba."

Researchers at the Australian Institute of International Affairs have called the Nakba "a historical starting point for still ongoing experiences of occupation and exile" and tied the ongoing nature of the Nakba directly to the nature of Israel's ethno-nationalist statehood, noting that "settler colonialism is not an event; it is a structure, which manifests in cycles of violence, displacement, and dispossession of the native local population ... Israel's settler colonial structure is maintained by a continued drive to dominate and – at times – eliminate the native population of Palestine."

The terminology of "ongoing catastrophe" has also been related to the experience of Palestinians in resettled camp environments, where the al-Nakba remains perceived as a phenomenon that never stopped. It has assumed the role of "a reverse national myth, a figure of un-becoming", whose impact continues in the erosion of the lives of those displaced.

Karma Nabulsi has noted that it is due to "the relentless and dynamic nature of the Catastrophe" and the lived daily experience of the Nakba that "the current attempts to destroy the Palestinian collectivity today bind this generation directly to the older one, and bind the exile to the core of the Palestinian body politics". Nabulsi observed in 2006 that the preceding years had "witnessed a phase of violent acceleration in this process of attempted destruction" that had only strengthened the sense of the Nakba's continuation.

A central aspect of the ongoing Nakba is the "systematic, ongoing and arbitrary forced displacement of Palestinians", including what has been described as the ghettoization of the Palestinian population through transfers, land confiscation and the concentration and confinement "of as many as possible of those who remain in the smallest possible areas of land". One example is Israel's creation of seven "concentration towns" for Palestinian Negev Bedouins, which accompanied a ruling that 45 other communities were illegal as of 2008 and the pressuring of their residents (sometimes violently) to move to the concentration towns.

== See also ==
- Gaza genocide
- Nakba denial
