= Sayegh =

Sayegh (Arabic: صيغ) is an Arabic surname which means goldsmith. It has also some variants, like Saieg or Sayigh. It is especially common in the Levant. Notable people with the surname include:

== Sayegh ==
- Abdul Nasser Al-Sayegh (born 1959), Kuwaiti fencer
- Adnan Al-Sayegh (born 1955), Iraqi singer
- Ahmad Ali Al Sayegh (born 1962), Emirati businessman and CEO of Dolphin Energy
- Bashar Al-Sayegh (born 1977), Kuwaiti journalist and politician
- Daud as-Sayegh, Iraqi communist politician
- Fayez Sayegh, Palestinian-American academic
- Fayez Sayegh (1922–1980), Palestinian-American academic and civil servant
- Faisal Al Sayegh, Lebanese Druze politician
- Hani al-Sayegh, Saudi citizen, and alleged member of Hezbollah Al-Hejaz
- Jean Sayegh (born 1981), Canadian water polo player
- Jim Sayegh, American television director
- Joe Sayegh, (1884–1946) Syrian born New Zealand politician and businessman
- Maximos IV Sayegh (1878–1967), Syrian cardinal
- May Sayegh (1940–2023), Palestinian poet, feminist, political activist and writer
- Nader Sayegh, Jordanian-American politician, attorney, and educator
- Patricio Sayegh (born 1967), Argentine professional association footballer
- Percy Sayegh (born 1965), Lebanese swimmer
- Salim Sayegh, Lebanese academic and politician
- Salim Sayegh (Catholic bishop) (born 1935), Patriarchal Vicar for Jordan in the Latin Patriarch of Jerusalem
- Tony Sayegh, United States Assistant Secretary of the Treasury for Public Affairs

== Sayigh ==
- Anis Sayigh (1931–2009), Palestinian historian
- Fayez Sayigh (1922–1980), Palestinian academic
- Rosemary Sayigh (born 1935), British-Palestinian writer and journalist
- Tawfiq Sayigh (1923–1971) Palestinian academic, writer and journalist.
- Yezid Sayigh (born 1955), Palestinian historian
- Yusif Sayigh (1916–2004), Palestinian economist
