= Zionism as settler colonialism =

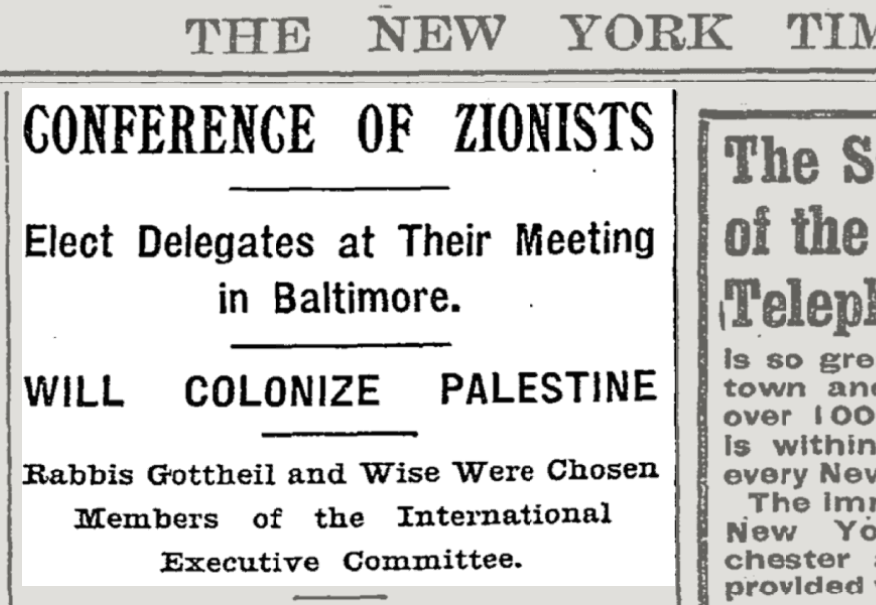
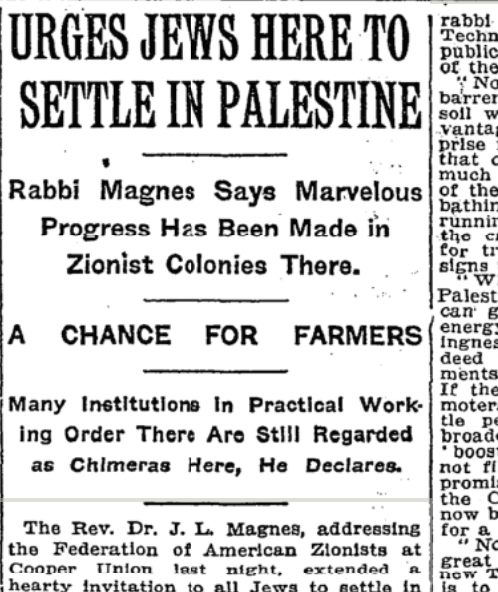
New York Times articles in 1899 and 1912 describing Zionism in terms of settlement and colonization.

Zionism has been described by several scholars as a form of settler colonialism in relation to the region of Palestine and the Israeli–Palestinian conflict. Zionism's founders and early leaders were aware and outspoken about their status as colonizers; early leading Zionists such as Theodor Herzl, Max Nordau, and Ze'ev Jabotinsky described Zionism as colonization.

As the theoretical framework of settler colonialism emerged in the 1960s during the decolonization of Africa and Asia, it was applied by some scholars to the Zionist colonization of Palestine. This perspective contends that Zionism involves processes of displacement and dispossession of Palestinian Arabs, akin to other settler colonial contexts similar to the creation of the United States.

Critics have argued that the characterization of Zionism as settler colonialism does not fit traditional colonial frameworks, seeing Zionism instead as the repatriation of an indigenous population and an act of self-determination. Critics also note that Jews have had a continuous presence in the land. This debate reflects broader tensions over competing historical and political narratives regarding indigeneity in the Israeli–Palestinian conflict and the founding and legitimacy of the State of Israel.

== Concepts ==
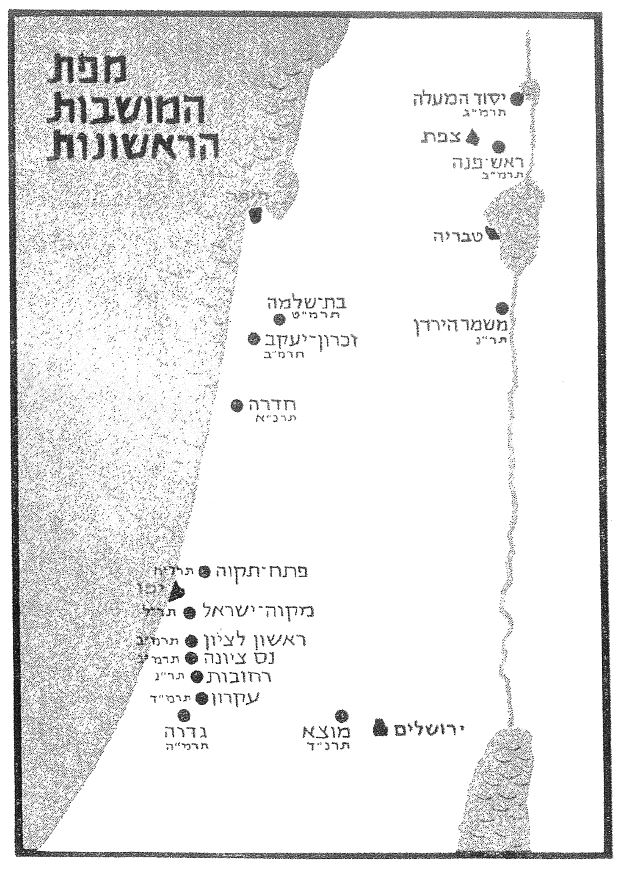
A map of the early Zionist Moshavot (מושבות, lit. 'colonies' or 'villages')

According to Fayez Sayegh, then director of the Palestine Research Center, Settler colonialism differs from classical colonialism in that it focuses on eliminating or removing, rather than exploiting, the original inhabitants of a territory. As theorized by Patrick Wolfe, settler colonialism is an ongoing "structure, not an event" aimed at replacing a native population. Settler colonialism operates by processes including physical elimination of native inhabitants but also can encompass projects of assimilation, segregation, miscegenation, religious conversion, and incarceration. Scholars, such as sociologists Daiva Stasiulis, Nira Yuval-Davis, and specialist in middle eastern studies Joseph Massad have included Israel in their global analyses of settler societies.

== Background ==
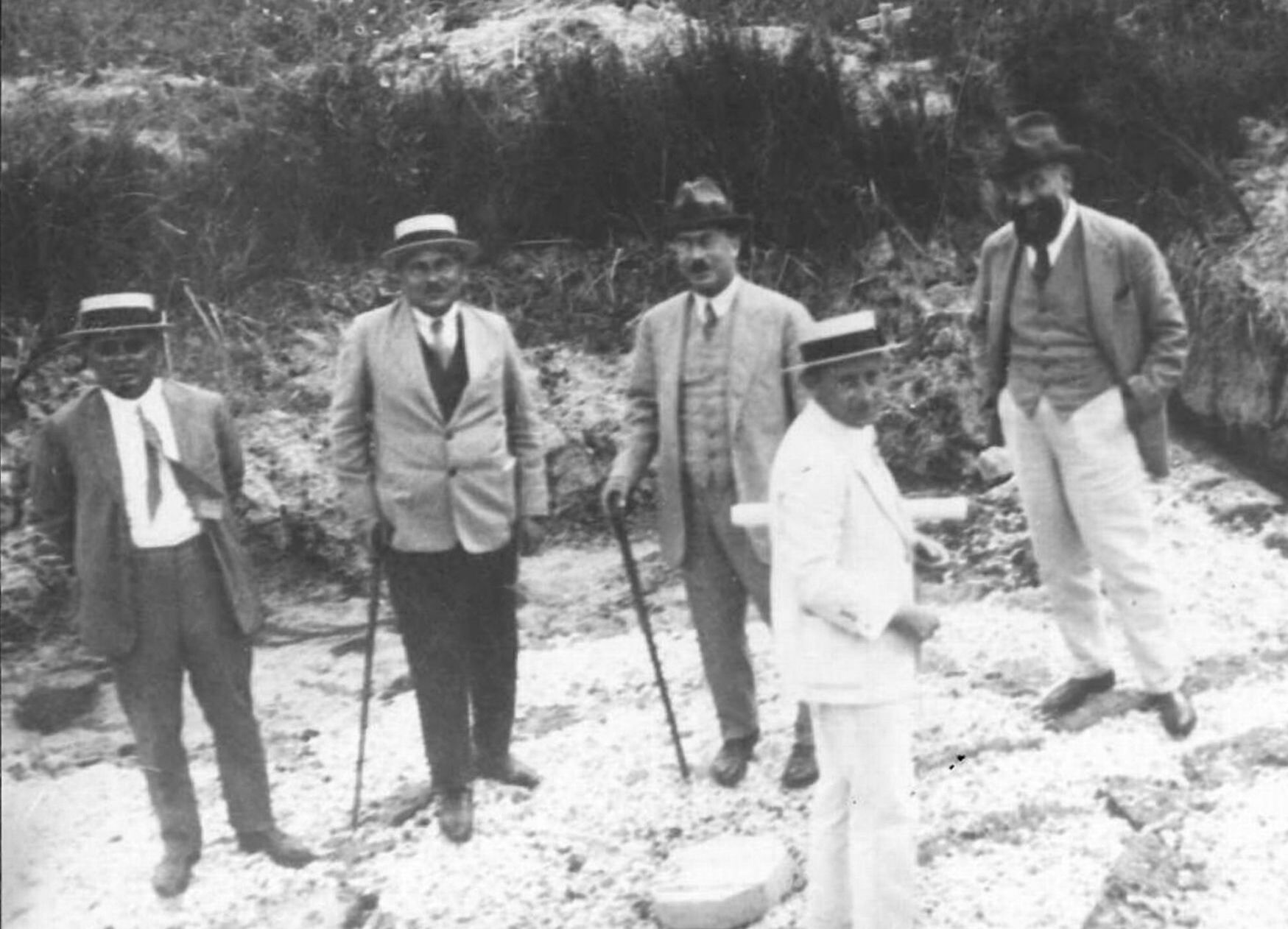
Members of the Palestine Jewish Colonization Association in Palestine c. 1920–1925

Many of the fathers of Zionism described Zionist activity in Palestine as "colonization", such as Vladimir Jabotinsky, who said "Zionism is a colonization adventure". (Note: Benjamin Beit-Hallahmi (1992) Original Sins: Reflections on the History of Zionism and Israel. Quotation (as quoted in Donald E. Wagner, Walter T. Davis (2014). Zionism and the Quest for Justice in the Holy Land, Chapter One: Political Zionism from Herzl (1890s) to Ben-Gurion (1960s) by Walter T. Davis and Pauline Coffman): "The Labor Zionist attitude towards the natives and their predicament was one of denial. The right-wing approach, developed by Jabotinsky, stated bluntly that the conflict was real, that dispossession was real and inevitable, but it was justified to fulfill Zionist plans. ... The right-wing Zionist attitude was one of defiance and confidence. The natives would have to accept their fate—namely an historical defeat. Right-wing Zionism has been quite open, even proud, about the colonialist role of Zionism and about its inherent violence vis-à-vis the natives of Palestine. Jabotinsky ... did not play games nor mince his words. He called a spade a spade and Zionism armed colonialism. Jabotinsky never denied the conflict between Zionism and the Palestinians. On the contrary, he made it into one of the basic assumptions of his political program.") Theodore Herzl, in a 1902 letter to Cecil Rhodes, described the Zionist project as "something colonial". Previously in 1896 he had spoken of "important experiments in colonization" happening in Palestine. In 1905 Max Nordau said, "Zionism rejects on principle all colonization on a small scale, and the idea of 'sneaking' into Palestine", and that instead it advocates "that the existing and promising beginnings of a Jewish colonization shall be looked after and maintained till the movement will be possible on a large scale".

Ilan Pappe writes that as early as 1882, the Zionist movement used words such as the Hebrew verb le-hitnahel ("to settle") or le-hityashev ("to colonize") and the Hebrew nouns hitanchalut ("settlement") and hitayasvut ("colonization") to describe the Israeli State's takeover of Palestinian land. He says it was following WWII, when colonialism began to be predominantly associated with "negative European policies and practices," that "the Zionist movement and later the state of Israel looked for ways to disassociate the Hebrew terminology from the colonialist one and started to use more universal and positive language to describe their policies."

Major Zionist organizations central to Israel's foundation held colonial identity in their names or departments, such as the Jewish Colonisation Association, the Palestine Jewish Colonisation Association, the Jewish Colonial Trust, and The Jewish Agency's colonization department. On the Colonial bank, Herzl, in a letter to Nordau, wrote that "The Jewish Colonial Bank must actually become the Jewish National Bank. Its colonial aspect is only window-dressing, hokum, a firm-name. A national financial instrument is to be created."

In 1905, some Zionist activists promoted the policy of Hebrew labor, which encouraged Jewish-owned enterprises to employ only Jewish workers. Zionist organizations acquired land under the restriction that it could never pass into non-Jewish ownership. Later on, kibbutzim—collectivist, all-Jewish agricultural settlements—were developed to counter plantation economies relying on Jewish owners and Palestinian farmers. The kibbutz was also the prototype of Jewish-only settlements later established beyond Israel's pre-1967 borders.

Map of Israeli settlements (magenta) in the occupied West Bank in 2025

Zionist leader Chaim Weizmann wrote in his autobiography that at the 1919 Paris Peace Conference he had spoken to US Secretary of State Robert Lansing of "the hope that by Jewish immigration, Palestine would ultimately become as Jewish as England is English" and described how he had taken as his example "the outstanding success which the French had at that time made of Tunisia. What the French could do in Tunisia," Weizmann said, "the Jews would be able to do in Palestine". Anthropologist Scott Atran wrote of this comparison between Zionism and French colonialism in Tunisia that "whereas direct French colonial rule sought to utilize, rather than displace, the fellah's labor, Zionist colonization had no use for Arab labor, at least in principle".

According to Yuval Evri and Hillel Cohen, "elements of anti-colonial and settler critique" are present in publications by Ḥayyim Ben Qīqī (1887–1935), a Sephardic rabbi and writer from Tiberias known for his criticisms of European cultural imperialism in West Asia and of European Zionist settlers in Palestine.

In 1948, 750,000 Palestinians fled or were forcibly displaced from the area that became Israel, and 500 Palestinian villages, as well as Palestinian-inhabited urban areas, were destroyed. Although considered by some Israelis to be a "brutal twist of fate, unexpected, undesired, unconsidered by the early [Zionist] pioneers", some historians have described the Nakba as a campaign of ethnic cleansing. In the aftermath, Palestinian land was expropriated on a large scale and Palestinian citizens of Israel were encircled in specific areas.

In a 1956 eulogy for Ro'i Rothberg, a kibbutz security officer killed near the Gaza border the previous day, Israeli Chief of Staff Moshe Dayan said: "Who are we that we should argue against their hatred? For eight years now, they sit in their refugee camps in Gaza and, before their very eyes we turn into our homestead the land and the villages in which they and their forefathers have lived. We are a generation of settlers, and without the steel helmet and the cannon we cannot plant a tree and build a home."

Arnon Degani argues that ending military rule over Israel's Palestinian citizens in 1966 shifted from colonial to settler-colonial governance. After the Israeli capture of the Golan Heights in 1967, there was a nearly complete ethnic cleansing of the area, leaving only 6,404 Syrians out of about 128,000 who had lived there before the war. They had been forcibly removed, and those who tried to return were deported. After the Israeli capture of the West Bank, about 250,000 of 850,000 inhabitants fled or were expelled.

== Scholarly development ==
The settler colonial framework on the Palestinian struggle emerged in the 1960s during the decolonization of Africa and the Middle East, and re-emerged in Israeli academia in the 1990s led by Israeli and Palestinian scholars, particularly the New Historians, who refuted some of Israel's foundational myths and considered the Nakba to be ongoing. This coincided with a shift from supporting a two-state solution to a one-state solution that constitutes a state for all citizens equally, which challenges the Jewish identity of Israel.

Proponents of the paradigm of Zionism as settler colonialism include Edward Said, Rashid Khalidi, Noam Chomsky, Ilan Pappé, Fayez Sayegh, Maxime Rodinson, George Jabbour, Ibrahim Abu-Lughod, Baha Abu-Laban, Jamil Hilal, Rosemary Sayigh, Amal Jamal and Ismail Raji al-Faruqi.

Historian Benny Morris rejects this notion of colonialism. "Colonialism is commonly defined as the policy and practice of an imperial power acquiring political control over another country, settling it with its sons, and exploiting it economically. By any objective standard, Zionism fails to fit this definition," he wrote. Zionists were "immigrating to a country that had once been populated and ruled by Jews, not 'another' country, and regaining sovereignty over it," he said.

=== 1960s ===
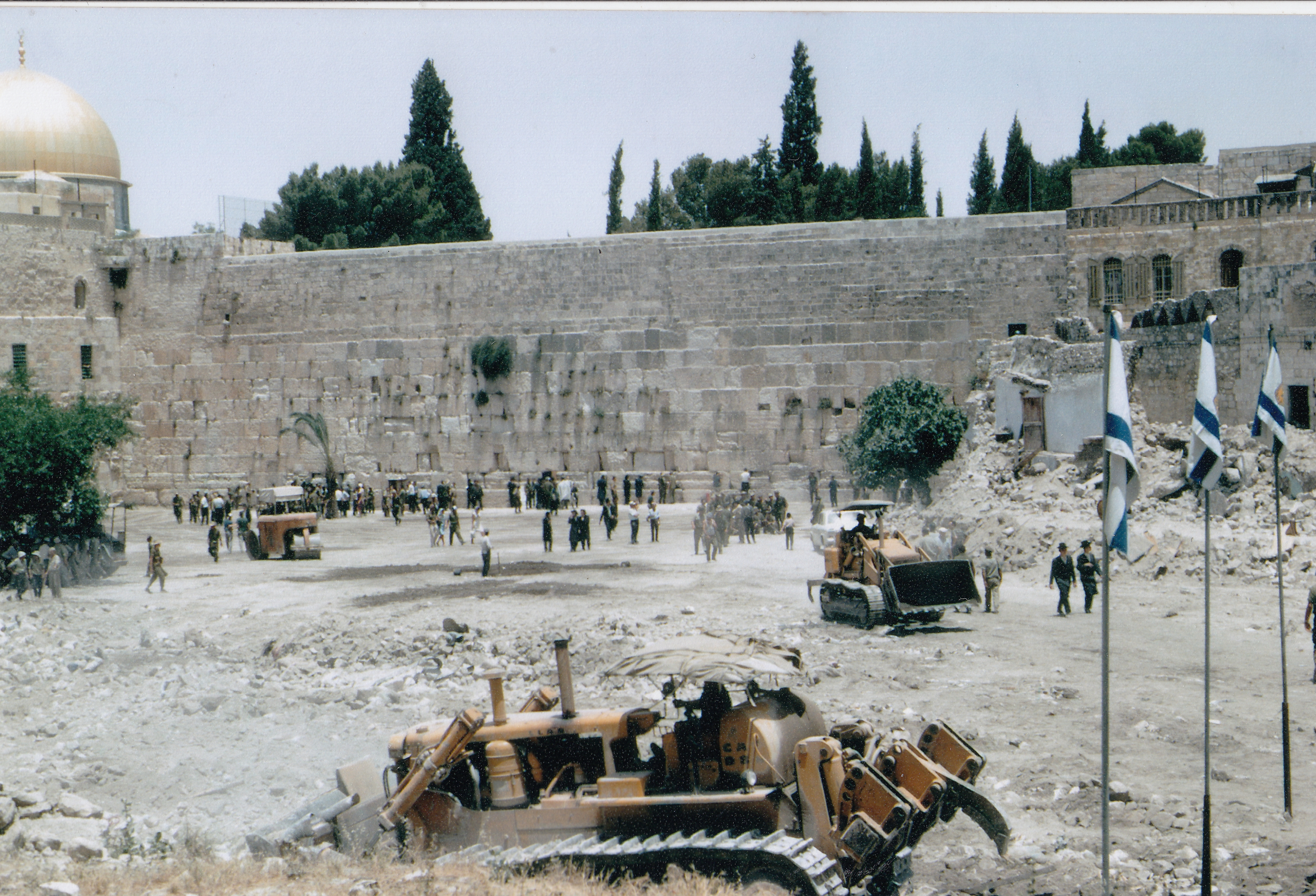
Upon Israel's occupation of the Old City of Jerusalem in the 1967 Arab-Israeli War, Israeli bulldozers demolished what had been the Mughrabi Quarter, creating the Western Wall Plaza. Scholars have discussed such moves as examples of Israel's Judaization of Jerusalem and Israeli settler colonialism.

One early analysis was that of Palestinian writer Fayez Sayegh in his 1965 essay "Zionist Colonialism in Palestine", which, according to Moshe Behar and the editors of Settler Colonial Studies, was unusual for the pre-1967 era in specifying Zionism as a form of settler colonialism, although it does not use the specific term. Sayegh argues that Zionists originally formed a "settler-community" during the first fifteen years of Zionist colonization (1882–1897) before fulfilling what had been their aspiration from the outset: to form a "settler-state".

By imitating the colonial ventures of the ‘Gentile nations’ among whom Jews lived, the ‘Jewish nation’ could send its own colonists into a piece of Afro-Asian territory, establish a settler-community, and, in due course, set up its own state– not, indeed, as an imperial outpost of a metropolitan home-base, but as a home-base in its own right, upon which the entire ‘Jewish nation’ would sooner or later converge from all over the world. ‘Jewish nationalism’ would thus fulfil itself through the process ofcolonisation, which other European nations had utilised for empire-building. For, Zionism, then, colonisation would be the instrument of nation-building, not the by-product of an already-fulfilled nationalism.

For Sayegh, the "special character" of "Zionist colonization" distinguishing it from European colonization was three-fold: (1) the latter was driven "either by economic or by politico-imperialist motives: they had gone either in order to accumulate fortunes by means of privileged and protected exploitation of immense natural resources, or in order to prepare the ground for (or else aid and abet) the annexation of those coveted territories by imperial European governments", whereas Zionism was animated by the desire to attain nationhood; (2) other European settlers could co-exist with natives, but Zionism was incompatible with the continued existence of a native population; (3) other settlers were protected by their imperial metropole, while Zionism was at the mercy not only of local opposition but also Ottoman opposition. This third element, he argued, led the Zionists into alliance with British imperialism.

In 1967, the French historian Maxime Rodinson published Israel: A Colonial Settler-State? (originally published in French). In it, he describes Europe as a whole as the metropole of Israeli settler colonialism. Rodinson had probably read Sayegh's work as his 1965 booklet had been translated into English and French.

After Israel assumed control of the whole Mandatory Palestine in 1967, settler-colonial analyses became prominent among Palestinians.

=== 1980–2000 ===
The "colonization perspective" emerged in the scholarship on Israeli history in the 1980s. This was associated with the New Historians movement in Israel, which focused on Israeli-Palestinian relations rather than only Jewish history and was willing to examine Zionist settlement's colonial character. Alongside explicitly settler colonial analysis, other scholars of the 1980s and 1990s, such as Abdo and Yuval-Davis, argued that the "Zionist national project has been predicated on the destruction of the Palestinian one".

Muslim philosopher and scholar of religion Isma'il Raji al-Faruqi characterized Zionism as a project that sought "to empty Palestine of its native inhabitants and to occupy their lands, farms, homes, and all movable properties," describing it as involving "robbery by force of arms" and "slaughter of men, women, and children." He viewed these actions as expressions of what he considered the movement's colonial nature.

=== 2000s ===
Rashid Khalidi argues that Zionism is both settler colonialism and a national movement, and that recognizing it as one does not negate that it is also the other.

According to Israeli sociologist Uri Ram, the characterization of Zionism as colonial "is probably as old as the Zionist movement". John Collins states that studies have "definitively established" that "the architects of Zionism were conscious and often unapologetic about their status as colonizers whose right to the land superseded that of Palestine's Arab inhabitants". Patrick Wolfe notes "Zionism presents an unparalleled example of deliberate, explicit planning. No campaign of territorial dispossession was ever waged more thoughtfully."

According to Wolfe, Israel's settler colonialism manifests in immigration policies that promote unlimited immigration of Jews while denying family reunification for Palestinian citizens. Wolfe adds, "Despite Zionism's chronic addiction to territorial expansion, Israel's borders do not preclude the option of removal [of Palestinians] (in this connection, it is hardly surprising that a nation that has driven so many of its original inhabitants into the sand should express an abiding fear of itself being driven into the sea)."

Hussein Ibish argues that such zero-sum calls are "a gift that no occupying power and no colonizing settler movement deserves."

The peer-reviewed journal Settler Colonial Societies has published three special issues focused on Israel/Palestine. Its editor Lorenzo Veracini, who describes Israel as a colonial state, states that Jewish settlers could only expel the British in 1948 because they had their own colonial relationships inside and outside Israel's new borders. He suggests, however, that the possibility of an Israeli disengagement is always latent and that this colonial relationship could be severed if a one-state solution is reached which includes the "accommodation of a Palestinian Israeli autonomy within the institutions of the Israeli state".

Scholar Amal Jamal, of Tel Aviv University, has described Israel as the result of "a settler-colonial movement of Jewish immigrants", stating that Israel has continued to strengthen "exclusive Jewish control" of the land and its resources, while diminishing Palestinian rights and denying Palestinian self-determination.

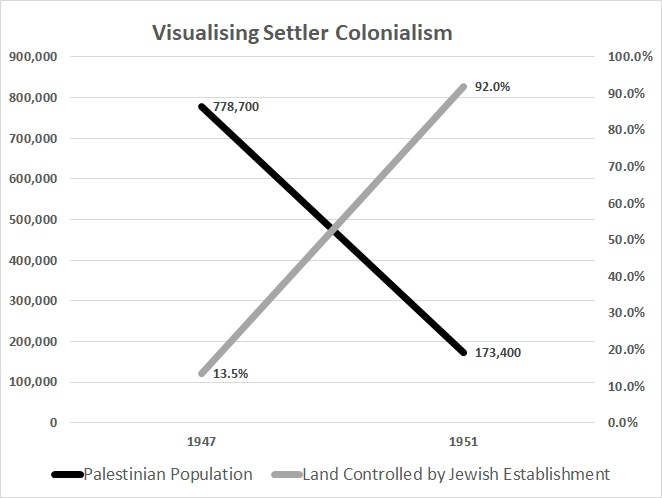
A graph by Neve Gordon showing the population shift from 1947 to 1951 in Israel–Palestine, plotted with the % of land controlled by what he calls the "Jewish establishment"

According to Israeli academics Neve Gordon and Moriel Ram, the incompleteness versus completeness of ethnic cleansing in the territory occupied by Israel has affected the different forms that Israeli settler colonialism has taken in the West Bank versus the Golan Heights. For example, the few remaining Syrian Druze were offered Israeli citizenship in order to further the annexation of the area, while there was never an intention to incorporate West Bank Palestinians into the Israeli demos. Another example is the dual legal structure in the West Bank compared to the unitary Israeli law imposed in the Golan Heights.

In 2008, in response to those who characterize Zionism as a national liberation movement, Gabriel Piterberg emphasized Zionism's dual nature as a movement that at once one of nationalist liberation and settler-colonialism, writing that Zionism "was both a Central-Eastern European national movement and a movement of European settlers which sought to carve out for itself a national patrimony with a colony in the East".

=== 2010s–2020s ===
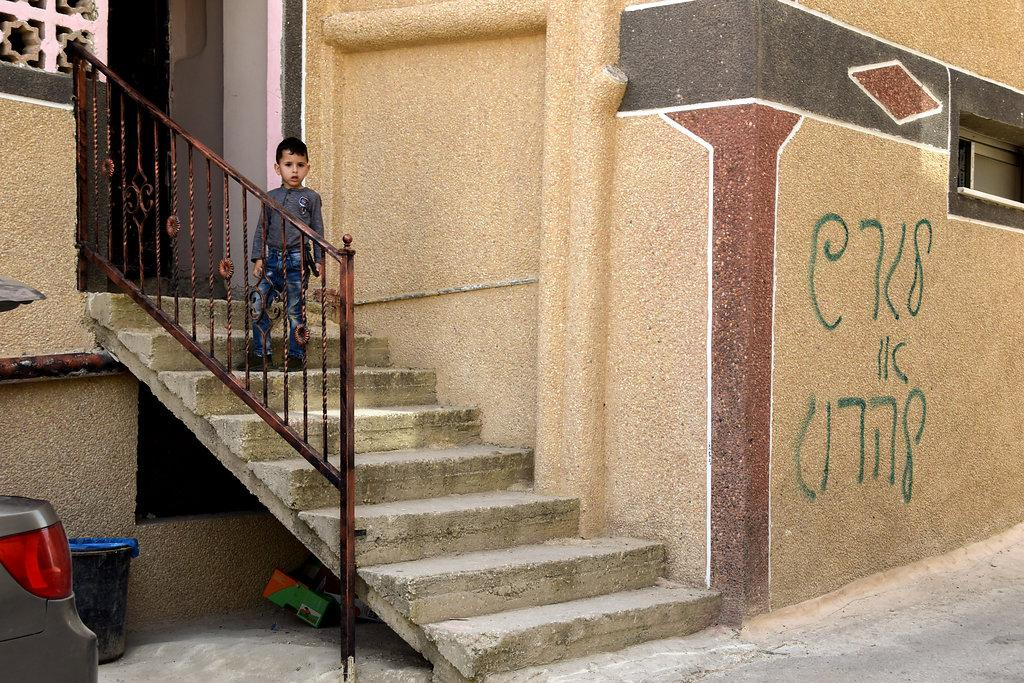
Hebrew graffiti spray-painted on a home in a-Sawiyah, Nablus by Zionist settlers in 2018 reads "Kill or deport."

Salamanca et al. state that Israeli practices have often been studied as distinct but related phenomena, and that the settler-colonial paradigm is an opportunity to understand them together. As examples of settler colonial phenomena they include "aerial and maritime bombardment, massacre and invasion, home demolitions, land theft, identity card confiscation, racist laws and loyalty tests, the wall, the siege on Gaza, cultural appropriation, dependence on willing (or unwilling) native collaboration regarding security arrangements".

Anthropologist Anne de Jong says that early Zionists promoted a narrative of binary conflict between two competing groups with equally valid claims in order to deflect criticisms of settler colonialism. In 2013, historian Lorenzo Veracini argued that settler colonialism has been successful in Israel proper but unsuccessful in the territories occupied in 1967. Historian Rashid Khalidi argues that all other settler-colonial wars in the twentieth century ended in defeat for colonists, making Palestine an exception: "Israel has been extremely successful in forcibly establishing itself as a colonial reality in a post-colonial age".

Although settler colonialism is an empirical framework, it is associated with favoring a one-state solution. Sociologist Rachel Busbridge argues that settler colonialism is "a coherent and legible frame" and "a far more accurate portrayal of the conflict than the picture of Palestinian criminality and Israeli victimhood that has conventionally been painted". She also argues that settler colonial analysis is limited, especially when it comes to the question of decolonization.

Historian Nur Masalha says, "The Palestinians share common experiences with other indigenous peoples who have had their narrative denied, their material culture destroyed and their histories erased or reinvented by European white settlers and colonisers." This paradigm has gained significant traction among left-leaning activists at universities. Palestinian-American historian Rashid Khalidi states that settler-colonial projects are usually "extensions of the people and of the sovereignty of the mother country", whereas Zionism is an independent "national movement" whose means were nevertheless "explicitly settler-colonial".

Doha Institute for Graduate Studies sociologist Elia Zureik's Israel's Colonial Project in Palestine: Brutal Pursuit applies Michel Foucault's work on biopolitics to colonialism, arguing that racism plays a central role and that surveillance becomes a tool of governance. It also analyses the dispossession of indigenous people and population transfer, including sociological, historical and postcolonial studies into an examination of the Zionist project in Palestine. Rosaura Sánchez and Beatrice Pita, US-based scholars of Chicano/a literature, argue that Israeli settler colonialism has had far more severe effects on the indigenous Palestinian population than the discriminations suffered by the Spanish and Mexican populations in the Southwest of the United States in the wake of the Treaty of Guadalupe Hidalgo which ended the Mexican–American War. Jeff Halper said that Zionism went in the direction of Settler-Colonialism without a full understanding of what it may involve. Most scholars who have addressed Israeli settler colonialism have not discussed the Golan Heights.

Sociologist Areej Sabbagh-Khoury suggests that "in tracing the settler colonial paradigm ... Israeli critical sociology, albeit groundbreaking, has suffered from a myopia engendered through hegemony." She states that "until recently, most Israeli academics engaged in discussing the nature of the state ignored its settler colonial components", and that scholarship conducted "within a settler colonial framework" has not been given serious attention in Israeli critical academia, "perhaps due to the general disavowal of the colonial framework among Israeli scholars."

In his 2020 book The Hundred Years' War on Palestine: A History of Settler Colonialism and Resistance, 1917–2017, Palestinian historian Rashid Khalidi, describes the Zionist claim to Palestine in the century spanning 1917–2017 as late settler colonialism and an instrument of British and then later American imperialism, doing so by focusing on a series of six major episodes the author characterizes as "declarations of war" on the Palestinian people.

The characterisation of Zionism as settler colonialism gained traction during the Gaza war. In 2024, The Economist said that the Palestinian diaspora has sought to reframe the Israeli-Palestinian conflict from "a clash between two national movements" to "a generational liberation struggle against 'settler colonialism'". This paradigm has gained significant traction among left-leaning activists at universities.

== Criticism of the concept ==
=== Scholarly criticism ===
Several scholars and historians dispute the application of the settler-colonial paradigm to Zionism, arguing that the movement's unique characteristics diverge from traditional colonial models. German philosopher Ingo Elbe contends that the paradigm reduces Zionism to "white settler colonialism," ignoring that Jews have maintained a continuous presence in "Palestine" since the Roman era and held a unique cultural connection to The Land of Israel. Elbe further notes that Zionism's "civilizing mission" was primarily directed inward at the Jewish people, and that European and Arab Jews were refugees fleeing systemic antisemitism and persecution rather than agents of a colonial metropole. Similarly, Israeli historian S. Ilan Troen characterizes Zionism as the repatriation of a long-displaced indigenous population, arguing it was not part of an imperial search for power or markets. Along with linguistic Carol Troen, he writes that the concept of Palestinian indigeneity is a recent addition to the "linguistic arsenal of lawfare" used to deny Israel's legitimacy. They suggest this frames Israel as inherently settler colonial and as "reprehensible in its exploitation of the indigenous."

Political scientist Alan Dowty argues that Zionism is an outlier because 80% of Jewish immigrants were refugees rather than imperial agents. Dowty emphasizes that these immigrants sought to reconstruct a society based on ancient Middle Eastern roots and a revived Semitic language, rather than extending European culture; he adds that early Zionists generally tried to ignore the existing population rather than dominate or reshape it. Legal scholar Steven E. Zipperstein describes Zionism as a national liberation movement, noting that the 1922 Palestine Mandate provided legal recognition of Jewish indigeneity. Zipperstein also mentions archaeological evidence of Jerusalem as an ancient Judean capital and notes that land was acquired through lawful, "arms-length" purchases at above-market prices. Historian Tuvia Friling adds that Zionists' severance of ties with their home countries to pursue "national restoration" further distinguishes them from traditional colonialists seeking fortune.

Other scholars focus on the absence of a "mother country" and the existential nature of the conflict. Literary critic Adam Kirsch notes that Zionists did not encounter a terra nullius but a territory governed by imperial powers that often restricted their entry; he argues that unlike classic colonial sites where indigenous peoples were destroyed, this conflict involves two peoples coexisting in the same land. This was accepted by some scholars while disputed by others. Philosopher Michael Walzer, while agreeing, added that "it is important to acknowledge (as Kirsch never quite does) that Israeli settlement on the West Bank from 1967 until the present moment fits the ideological construction all too neatly."

While historians Susan Pedersen and Caroline Elkins acknowledge that Zionist methods may have been colonizing, they maintain the movement lacked the imperial strategic direction central to settler colonialism. Historians Benny Morris and Tom Segev concur that the movement was defined by its refugee nature rather than an imperial power's economic exploitation or a desire to dominate the local population. Morris argues that the lack of an imperial power to benefit from exploiting the region means a colonial paradigm does not apply. Other scholars have stated that Israel's external supporters, either private organizations or various states (such as the United Kingdom, France, Germany, Australia, or the United States), may function as a metropole (defined as the homeland of a colonial empire).

Law scholar Yuval Shany characterized the struggle as one between "two indigenous groups", calling the colonial label a "significant category error", and points to the fact that "Israel's creation was endorsed by the United Nations."

However, Muhannad Ayyash argues that Zionist discourse "justifies, normalizes and propagates Israeli settler colonial conquest and domination" by emphasizing "the supposed nationalist nature of the Zionist project", thereby presenting the Zionist project not as a case of settler colonialism, but as a "liberatory project that offered the solution to the Jewish Question of antisemitic Europe."

=== Jews and Israelis ===
The portrayal of Zionism as settler colonialism is strongly rejected by most Zionists and Israeli Jews, and is perceived either as an attack on the legitimacy of Israel, a form of antisemitism, or historically inaccurate. Sociologist Jeffrey C. Alexander refers to colonialism as "the go-to term for total pollution" of Israel's legitimacy. According to scholar Bernard D. Goldstein, "The accusation of 'settler colonialism' is increasingly used to attack Israel and justify its destruction."

Roger Cohen argues that Israel's "very diverse, multihued society" includes many Jews who fled persecution in the Middle East and Europe, and who had no "metropole" they could flee to, unlike most settler colonial societies.

== See also ==
- Anabaptist settler colonialism
- Indigeneity in the Israeli-Palestinian conflict
