= Settler colonialism =

Colonialism which replaces natives with settlers

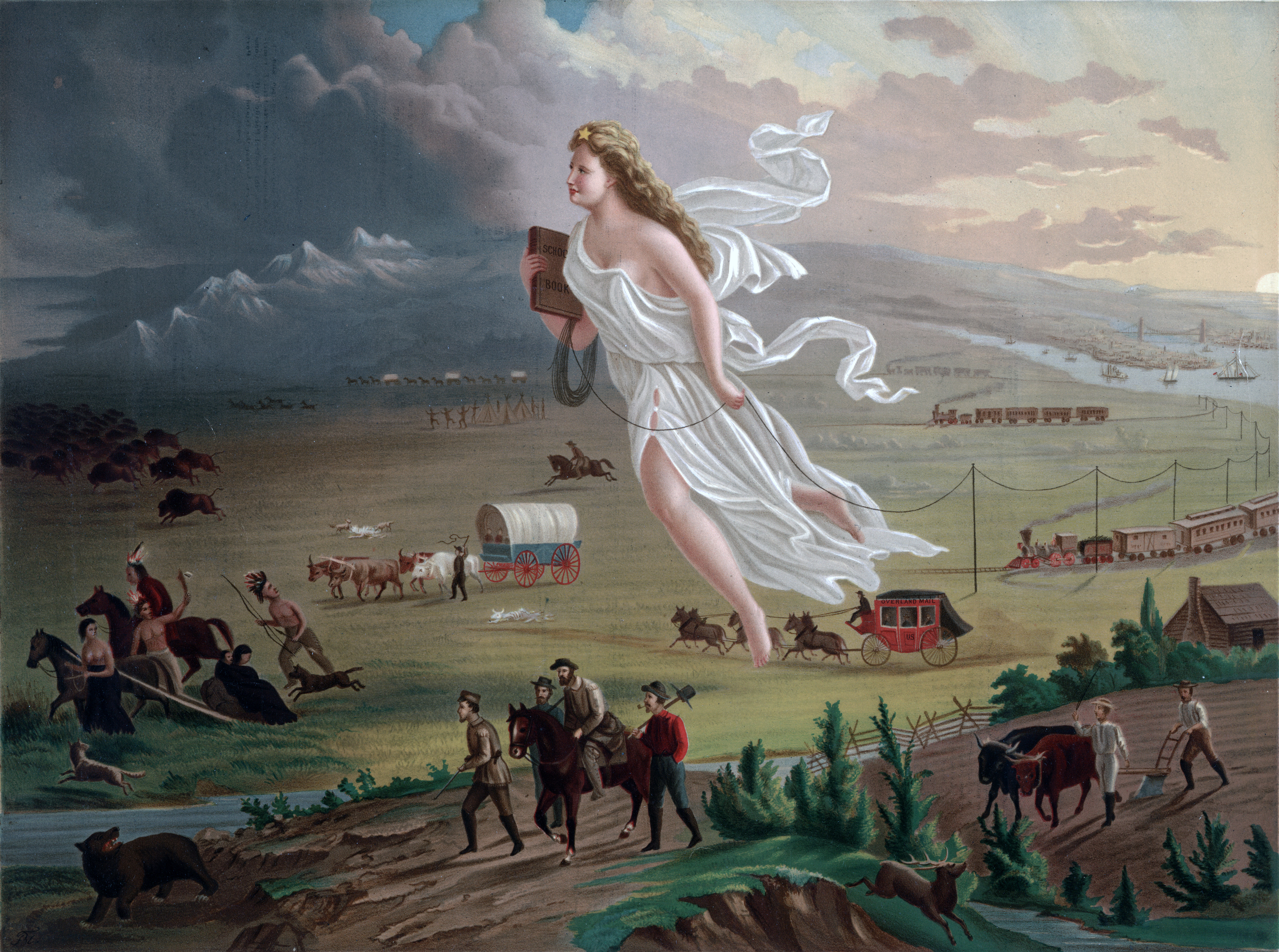
American Progress (1872) by John Gast. Columbia, a personification of the United States, is shown leading civilization westward with American settlers, while Native Americans are displaced from their ancestral homeland on the left.

Settler colonialism is a process by which settlers exercise colonial rule over a land and its indigenous peoples, transforming the land, and eliminating and replacing its population with the society of the settlers.

Settler colonialism is a form of exogenous (of external origin) domination typically organized or supported by an imperial authority, which maintains a connection or control to the territory through the settlers. As settler colonialism entails the creation of a new society on the conquered territory, it lasts indefinitely unless decolonisation occurs through departure of the settler population or through reforms to colonial structures, settler-indigenous compacts and reconciliation processes. (Note: Example reconciliation programmes include: Reconciliation in Australia, and truth and reconciliation commissions in Canada, Norway and South Africa.)

Settler colonial studies have often focused on English-speaking settler colonies in Australia and North America, which are close to the complete, prototypical form of settler colonialism. However, settler colonialism is not restricted to any specific culture; it has been practiced by non-European nations like Japan, and among European cultures, as in the case of Ireland.

== Origins as a theory ==
During the 1960s, settlement and colonization were perceived as separate phenomena from colonialism. Settlement endeavours were seen as taking place in empty areas, tending to disregard the indigenous inhabitants. Later on, in the 1970s and 1980s, settler colonialism was seen as bringing high living standards in contrast to the failed political systems associated with classical colonialism. Beginning in the mid-1990s, the field of settler colonial studies was established distinct from but connected to Indigenous studies. Although often credited with originating the field in his Settler Colonialism and the Transformation of Anthropology (1999), Australian historian Patrick Wolfe stated that "I didn't invent Settler Colonial Studies. Natives have been experts in the field for centuries." Additionally, Wolfe's work was preceded by others that have been influential in the field, such as Fayez Sayegh's Zionist Colonialism in Palestine (1965), Settler Capitalism by Donald Denoon (1983) and Daiva Stasiulis and Nira Yuval-Davis in Unsettling Settler Societies (1995).

== Definition and concept ==
Settler colonialism is characterized as both a logic and a system; in the words of Patrick Wolfe, it is "a structure not an event". Settler colonialism takes claim of environments for replacing existing conditions and people of that environment with those of the settlement and settlers. Intrinsically connected to this is the displacement or elimination of existing residents, particularly through destruction of their environment and society. As such, settler colonialism has been identified as a form of environmental racism.

Wolfe's model of settler colonial theory posits that settler colonialism is categorically distinct from other forms of colonialism by its drive to "eliminate the native", instead of exploiting them. For Wolfe and his "intellectual successor" Lorenzo Veracini, settler colonialism is "structural, eliminatory, and land based, which—they argued—distinguish it from franchise colonialism, which is based on the exploitation of the native population instead." Therefore, colonial settling has been called an invasion or occupation, emphazising the violent reality of colonization and its settling, in contrast to the more domestic sense of "settling".

According to certain genocide scholars, including Raphael Lemkin—the individual who coined the term genocide—colonization is intimately connected with genocide. Some scholars further describe the process as inherently genocidal, considering settler colonialism to entail the elimination of existing peoples and cultures, and not only their displacement (see genocide, "the intentional destruction of a people in whole or in part"). Depending on the definition, for Wolfe settler colonial eliminationism may be enacted by a variety of means, including mass killing of the original inhabitants, forced removal of the original inhabitants, and/or cultural assimilation, which can take the form of "child abduction, religious conversion, resocialization in total institutions such as missions or boarding schools", among other things.

However, the opposite argument has been made by Veracini, who argues that all genocide is settler colonial in nature but not all settler colonialism is genocidal. Sai Englert also argues against the Wolfe model, proposing that settler colonies have used both elimination and exploitation in their relations with indigenous peoples, and often transitioned from one to the other: "By assuming that exploitation, by definition, lays outside the realm of its field of study, SCS has privileged the analysis of the Anglo-settler world—primarily North America and Oceania." For him, the specificity of settler colonialism from other forms of colonialism is its social relations of class struggle within settler societies over the distribution of "colonial loot"; that is, understanding settler colonialism "as a process within a broader framework of capitalist accumulation".

Settler colonialism is distinct from replacement migration due to integration of immigrants into an existing society and not replacement with a parallel society. Mahmood Mamdani writes, "Immigrants are unarmed; settlers come armed with both weapons and a nationalist agenda. Immigrants come in search of a homeland, not a state; for settlers, there can be no homeland without a state." Nevertheless, the difference is often elided by settlers who minimize the voluntariness of their departure, claiming that settlers are mere migrants, and some pro-indigenous positions which militantly simplify, claiming that all migrants are settlers.

A settler state is an autonomous or independent political entity established through settler colonialism by and for settlers. This occurs when a migrant settler society assumes a politically dominant position over the indigenous peoples and forms a self-sustaining state that operates independently of the metropole, the homeland of a colonial empire. Countries that have been described as settler states include the United States, Canada, Argentina, Chile, Uruguay, Australia, New Zealand, Israel, and Taiwan, and formerly Liberia, South Africa, and Rhodesia.

== Examples ==
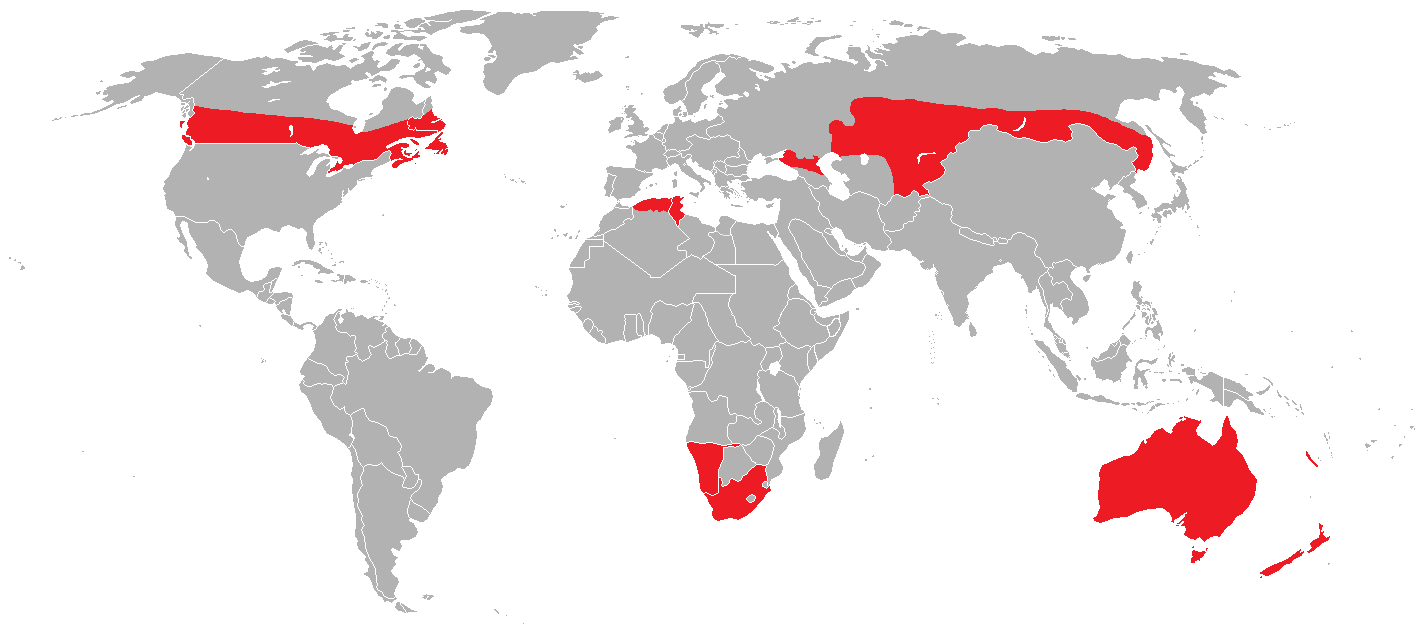
Areas of colonial settlement in 1914 (without independent settler states)

The settler colonial paradigm has been applied to a wide variety of conflicts around the world, including New Caledonia, Western New Guinea, the Andaman Islands, Argentina, Uruguay, Chile, Australia, British Kenya, the Canary Islands, Northern Cyprus, Fiji, French Algeria, Generalplan Ost, Hawaii, Ireland, Israel/Palestine, Italian Libya and East Africa, Kashmir, Hokkaido, Korea and Manchukuo, Jazira and Kirkuk, Latin America, Liberia, New Zealand, northern Afghanistan, the United States, Canada, Posen and West Prussia and German South West Africa, Rhodesia, Sápmi, South Africa, South Vietnam, and Taiwan.

=== Africa ===
Areas of Africa controlled by Western European colonial empires in 1913, shown with current national boundaries Belgium France Germany Italy Portugal Spain United Kingdom Independent

==== Canary Islands ====
During the fifteenth century, the Kingdom of Castile sponsored expeditions by conquistadors to subjugate under Castilian rule the Macaronesian archipelago of the Canary Islands, located off the coast of Morocco and inhabited by the Indigenous Guanche people. Beginning with the start of the conquest of the island of Lanzarote on 1 May 1402 and ending with the surrender of the last Guanche resistance on Tenerife on 29 September 1496 to the now-unified Spanish crown, the archipelago was subject to a settler colonial process involving systematic enslavement, mass murder, and deportation of the Guanches, who were replaced with Spanish settlers, in a process foreshadowing the Iberian colonisation of the Americas that followed shortly thereafter. Also like in the Americas, Spanish colonialists in the Canaries quickly turned to the importation of slaves from mainland Africa as a source of labour due to the decimation of the already small Guanche population by a combination of war, disease, and brutal forced labour. Historian Mohamed Adhikari has labelled the conquest of the Canary Islands as the first overseas European settler colonial genocide.

==== Ethiopia ====
Following the conquests of Menelik II in the late 19th century, a system of imperial conquest effectively based on settler colonialism, involving the deployment of armed settlers in newly created military colonies, was widespread throughout the southern and western territories that came under Menelik's dominion. Under the 'Neftenya-Gabbar scheme' the Ethiopian Empire had developed a relatively effective system of occupation and pacification. Soldier-settlers and their families moved into fortified villages known as katamas in strategic regions to secure the southern expansion. These armed settlers and their families were known as the neftenya and peasant farmers who were assigned to them the gabbar.

The Neftenya (lit. 'Gun-carrier' or 'Armed settler') were assigned gabbar from the locally conquered population, who effectively worked in serfdom for the conquerors. The majority of the neftenya were Amhara from Shewa. The neftenya-gabbar relationship was a 'feudal-like patron client relationship' between the northern settlers and southern locals. As land was taken, the northern administrators became the owners and possessed the right to dispose of land as they pleased. Those conquered found themselves displaced, often reduced to tenants on their own lands by the new Amhara ruling elite. The feudal obligations imposed on the gabbar were so intensive that they continued to serve the family of a neftegna even after the latter's death. The gabbar system worked efficiently for nearly half a century in financing the garrisoning and administration of the south until its formal dissolution in 1941.

==== Moroccan-occupied Western Sahara ====
The Moroccan Wall, constructed in phases between 1980 and 1987, separates the Moroccan-controlled portion of Western Sahara, where Morocco has promoted settlement, from the Polisario-held territory.

Since 1975, the Kingdom of Morocco has sponsored settlement schemes that have encouraged several thousand Moroccan citizens to settle Moroccan-occupied Western Sahara as part of the Western Sahara conflict. On 6 November 1975, the Green March took place, during which about 350,000 Moroccan citizens crossed into Saguia al-Hamra in the former Spanish Sahara after having received a signal from King Hassan II. As of 2015, it is estimated that Moroccan settlers constitute two-thirds of the population of Western Sahara.

==== South Africa ====
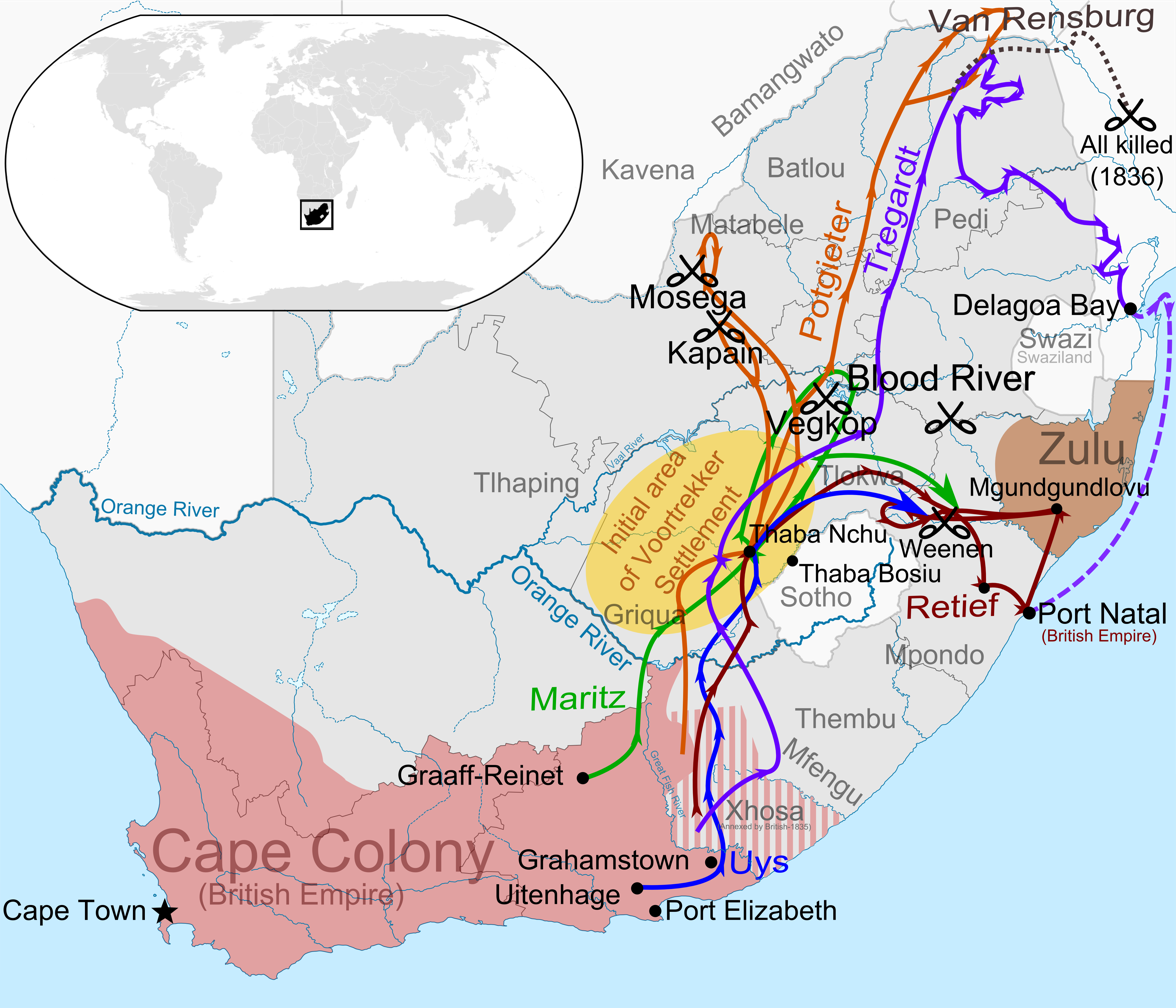
Map of the migration of the Boers into South Africa known as the Great Trek

In 1652, the arrival of Europeans sparked the beginning of settler colonialism in South Africa. The Dutch East India Company was set up at the Cape, and imported large numbers of slaves from Africa and Asia during the mid-seventeenth century. The Dutch East India Company established a refreshment station for ships sailing between Europe and the east, initially planning to maintain a small community around the new fort, but the community continued to spread and settle further. In 1948, the policy of Apartheid was introduced South Africa in order to segregate the races and ensure the domination of the Afrikaner minority over non-whites, politically, socially and economically.

==== Liberia ====
Liberia is regarded by some scholars as a unique example of settler colonialism and the only known instance of Black settler colonialism. It is described as an African American settler colony tasked with establishing a Western form of governance in Africa.

Liberia was founded as the private colony of Liberia in 1822 by the American Colonization Society, a White American-run organization, to relocate free African Americans to Africa, as part of the Back-to-Africa movement. U.S. presidents Thomas Jefferson and James Madison publicly endorsed and funded the project. Between 1822 and the early 20th century, around 15,000 African Americans colonized Liberia on lands acquired from the region's indigenous African population. The African American elite monopolized the government and established minority rule over the locals. As they possessed Western culture, they felt superior to the natives, whom they dominated and oppressed. Indigenous revolts against the Americo-Liberian elite such as the Liberian–Grebo War in 1875–1876 and Kru Revolt in 1915 were quelled with U.S. military support.

=== North America ===
==== Canada ====
The Numbered Treaties signed between 1871 and 1921 transferred large tracts of land from the First Nations to Canada in return for different promises laid out in each treaty.

Attempts to assimilate the Indigenous peoples of what is now Canada were rooted in imperial colonialism centred around European worldviews and cultural practices, and a concept of land ownership based on the discovery doctrine. Original assimilation efforts were religiously-oriented, beginning in the 17th century with the arrival of French missionaries in New France. Although not without conflict, European Canadians' early interactions with First Nations and Inuit populations were relatively peaceful. First Nations and Métis peoples (of mixed European and Indigenous ancestry) played a critical part in the development of European colonies in Canada, particularly for their role in assisting European coureur des bois and voyageurs in their explorations of the continent during the North American fur trade.

The early European interactions with First Nations would change from Peace and Friendship Treaties to dispossession of lands through treaties and displacement legislation such as the Gradual Civilization Act, the Indian Act, the Potlatch ban, and the pass system, that focused on European ideals of Christianity, sedentary living, agriculture, and education.

Indigenous groups in Canada continue to suffer from racially motivated discrimination, despite living in one of the most progressive countries in the world. Discriminatory practices such as criminal justice inequity, police brutality, high incarceration rates, and high rates of violence against Indigenous women have been subject to legal and political review.

==== United States ====
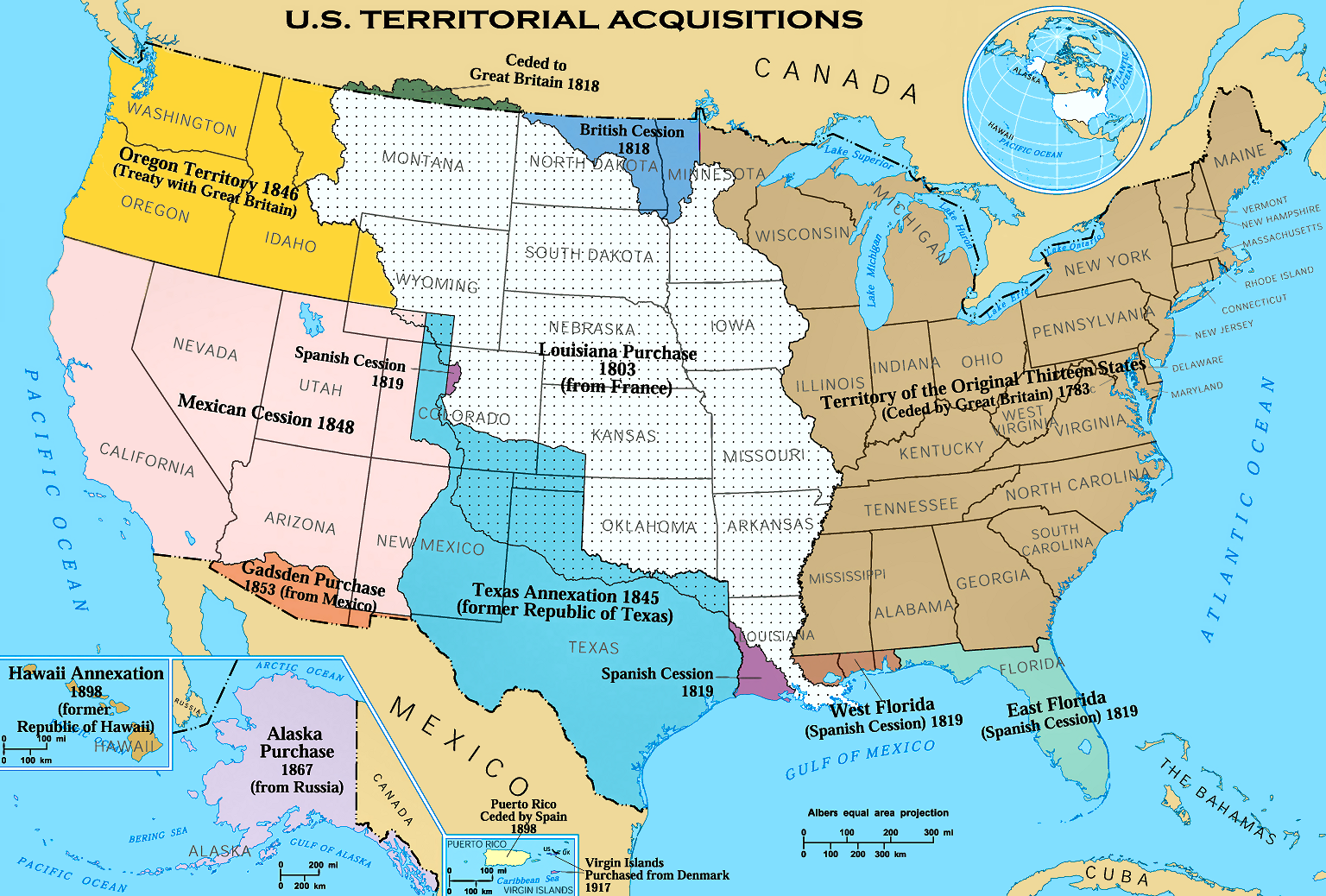
U.S. westward expansion in the 19th century

In colonial America, European powers created economic dependency and imbalance of trade, incorporating Indigenous nations into spheres of influence and controlling them indirectly with the use of Christian missionaries and alcohol. With the emergence of an independent United States, desire for land and the perceived threat of permanent Indigenous political and spatial structures led to violent relocation of many Indigenous tribes to the American West, in what is known as the Trail of Tears. Native Americans resisted American encroachment but successive defeats were followed by white settlement, with dispossession via treaties such as the 1795 Treaty of Greenville or 1819 Treaty of Saginaw.

Frederick Jackson Turner, the father of the "frontier thesis" of American history, noted in 1901: "Our colonial system did not start with Spanish War; the U.S. had had a colonial history from the beginning...hidden under the phraseology of 'interstate migration' and territorial organization'". While the United States government and local state governments directly aided this dispossession through the use of military forces, ultimately this came about through agitation by settler society in order to gain access to Indigenous land. Especially in the US South, such land acquisition built plantation society and expanded the practice of slavery.

=== South America ===
==== Argentina ====
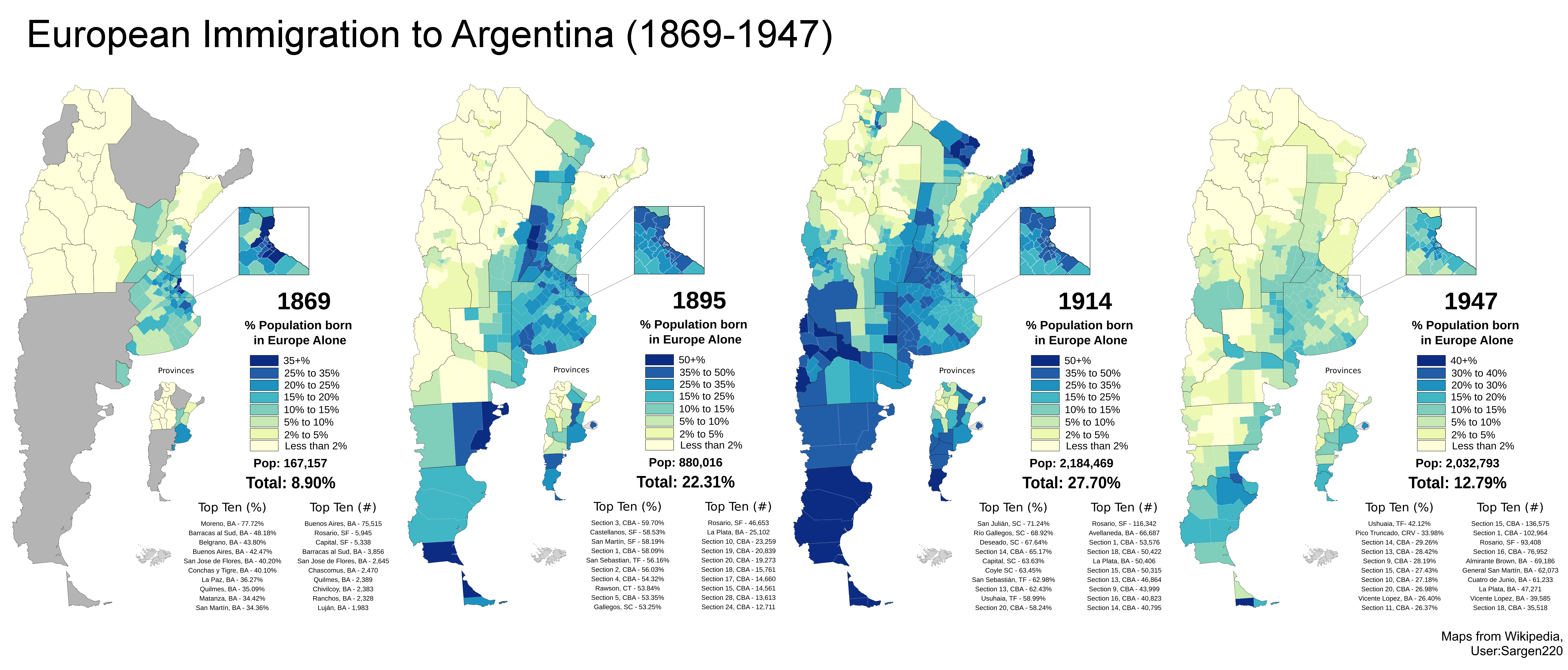
European Immigration to Argentina (1869–1947)

In Argentina, settler colonialism began with Spanish conquest in the 16th century, establishing settlements such as Buenos Aires and displacing indigenous groups such as the Querandí and Tehuelche. Following the Argentine Declaration of Independence, the Conquest of the Desert led by General Julio Argentino Roca during the 1870s and 1880s annexed Patagonia, resulting in the displacement and mass killing of the indigenous Mapuches to secure land for European settlers who developed it for agriculture. Between the late 19th century and early 20th century, a wave of over six million European immigrants, primarily Italians and Spaniards, solidified Argentina's composition as a predominantly European-descended society.

=== Asia ===
==== Bahrain ====
The Al Khalifa ruling family of Bahrain have been described as settler colonialists. Originally Sunnis from Najd, they conquered the island from Zand Persia during the Bani Utbah invasion of Bahrain in 1783 and ruled over the indigenous Baharna population since.

==== China ====
The expansion of the Qing dynasty of China

Near the end of their rule the Qing dynasty attempted to colonize Xinjiang, Tibet, and other parts of the imperial frontier. To accomplish this goal, they began resettling Han Chinese on the frontier. This policy of settler colonialism was renewed by the People's Republic of China, led by Chinese Communist Party, and is being practiced today according to some academics and researchers.

==== Indonesia ====
Indonesia's Transmigration program has been characterized by scholars as a form of settler colonialism, particularly in relation to West Papua. The programme, which originated during the Dutch colonial period and expanded substantially under the Indonesian government, relocated people from more densely populated islands to less densely populated regions. In West Papua, the Indonesian state used transmigration and other settlement policies to promote demographic and political integration of the territory. Large-scale migration altered the region's demographic composition and was accompanied by the dispossession and marginalization of Indigenous Papuan communities.

==== Israel ====
Some scholars of settler colonialism have characterized Zionism in Palestine as a form of settler colonialism; this characterization has also been criticized. Map of Israeli settlements (magenta) in the occupied West Bank as of July 2025. The Australian historian Patrick Wolfe, credited with originating the field, famously defined Israel as the foremost example of a settler colonialist state today. However, this notion has also received significant criticism.

Zionism has been characterized by some scholars such as the New Historians as a form of settler colonialism concerning the region of Palestine and the Israeli–Palestinian conflict. This framework has also been embraced by various activists. This viewpoint has been criticised by other scholars due to its perceived denial of the historical Jewish connection to Palestine, among other reasons. Many of the founding fathers of Zionism themselves described the project as colonization, such as Vladimir Jabotinsky, who said "Zionism is a colonization adventure." Theodor Herzl, the founder of the World Zionist Organization, described the Zionist project as "something colonial" in a letter to Cecil Rhodes in 1902.

In 1967, the French historian Maxime Rodinson wrote an article later translated and published in English as Israel: A Colonial Settler-State?, but it was not until the 1990s that this viewpoint became more common in Israeli scholarship, (Note: Sabbagh-Khoury writes: "The settler colonial paradigm, linked to Israeli critical sociology, post-Zionism, and postcolonialism, reemerged following changes in the political landscape from the mid-1990s that reframed the history of the Nakba as enduring, challenged the Jewish definition of the state, and legitimated Palestinians as agents of history. Palestinian scholars in Israel lead the paradigm's reformulation.") in part coinciding with increased support for a two state solution. The Australian historian Patrick Wolfe, whose work is considered defining on the subject of settler colonialism, has classified Israel as a modern form of settler colonialism.

Lorenzo Veracini describes Israel as a "settler colonial polity", and writes that it could celebrate its anticolonial struggle in 1948 because it had colonial relationships inside and outside Israel's new borders. Veracini believes the possibility of an Israeli disengagement is always latent and this relationship could be severed through a one state solution. (Note: Veracini says this could be an "accommodation of a Palestinian Israeli autonomy within the institutions of the Israeli state".) Other commentators, such as Daiva Stasiulis, Nira Yuval-Davis, and Joseph Massad have included Israel in their global analysis of settler societies. Ilan Pappé describes Zionism and Israel in similar terms. Scholar Amal Jamal, from Tel Aviv University, has stated, "Israel was created by a settler-colonial movement of Jewish immigrants". Damien Short has accused Israel of carrying out genocide against Palestinians during the Israeli–Palestinian conflict since its inception within a settler colonial context.

Critics of the paradigm argue that Zionism does not fit the traditional framework of colonialism. S. Ilan Troen views Zionism as the return of an indigenous population to its historic homeland, distinct from imperial expansion. Moses Lissak says that the settler-colonial thesis denies the idea that Zionism is the modern national movement of the Jewish people, seeking to reestablish a Jewish political entity in their historical territory. Lissak argues that Zionism was both a national movement and a settlement movement at the same time, so it was not, by definition, a colonial settlement movement.

==== Japan ====
The Japanese incorporation and settlement of Hokkaido in the 19th century has been described by historians as a form of settler colonialism. Hokkaido, then commonly known as Ezo, was inhabited by the Ainu people, whose political, economic, and cultural autonomy had already been eroded by earlier Japanese expansion. Following the Meiji Restoration, the Japanese government incorporated Hokkaido into the Japanese state and promoted large-scale settlement and economic development by ethnic Japanese. These policies involved the appropriation of Ainu land and resources and the assimilation of the Ainu into Japanese society. The resulting demographic transformation made the Ainu a small minority in their historical homeland.

==== Russia and the Soviet Union ====
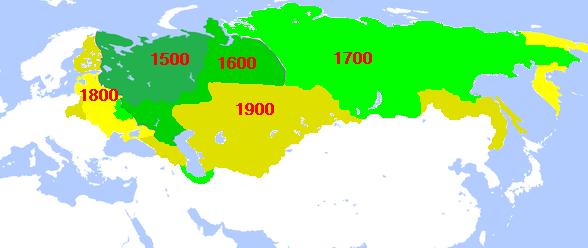
Expansion of Russia 1500–1900

Some scholars describe Russia as a settler colonial state, particularly in its expansion into Siberia and the Russian Far East, during which it displaced and resettled Indigenous peoples, while practicing settler colonialism. The annexation of Siberia and the Far East to Russia was resisted by the Indigenous peoples, while the Cossacks often committed atrocities against them.

This colonization continued during the Soviet Union in the 20th century. The Soviet policy also included the deportation of native populations, as in the case of the Crimean Tatars. During the Cold War, new forms of Indigenous repression were practiced.

==== Turkish invasion of Cyprus ====
Following the 1974 Turkish invasion of Cyprus, Turkey facilitated the mass resettlement of civilians from mainland Turkey into the northern part of the island, supplementing the Turkish Cypriot population. This occurred alongside the displacement of approximately 150,000 Greek Cypriots from the north and the prevention of their return, developments that some sources describe as ethnic cleansing. Scholars such as Nikos Moudouros who analyze the case within the framework of modern settler colonialism point to its hybrid and incomplete nature: the settler population remains structurally dependent on Turkey, has not achieved political or economic dominance over the indigenous Turkish Cypriot community, and is situated within ongoing tensions involving the metropole, the local administration, the long-established Turkish population dating back to the Ottoman conquest, and the settlers themselves. The situation is therefore viewed as a fluid and hybrid example of contemporary settler colonialism rather than a fully consolidated settler-colonial state.

=== Australia ===
Australians of European origin from 1947 to 1966 when racial data was collected

Since the arrival of the First Fleet in 1787, Europeans explored and settled lands in Australia as terra nullius, displacing Aboriginal and Torres Strait Islander peoples. The Indigenous Australian population was estimated at 795,000 at the time of European settlement. The population declined steeply for 150 years following settlement from 1788, due to casualties from infectious disease, the Australian frontier wars and forced re-settlement and cultural disintegration. Between 1788 and 1868, the British Empire transported around 162,000 convicts from Great Britain and Ireland to the several penal colonies in Australia. Once freed, many convicts qualified for land grants on indigenous lands taken by the British, helping build a European settler society.

=== Europe ===
==== Ireland ====
The Plantations of Ireland in the 16th and 17th centuries have been described by historians as an early form of settler colonialism. English governments confiscated land from Irish landowners and redistributed it to settlers from England and Scotland, particularly during the plantations of Munster and Ulster. The plantations sought to establish communities loyal to the English Crown and to strengthen English political and cultural control over Ireland. The resulting settlement transformed patterns of landownership and contributed to the development of a Protestant settler population alongside the predominantly Catholic Irish population.

==== Nazi Germany ====
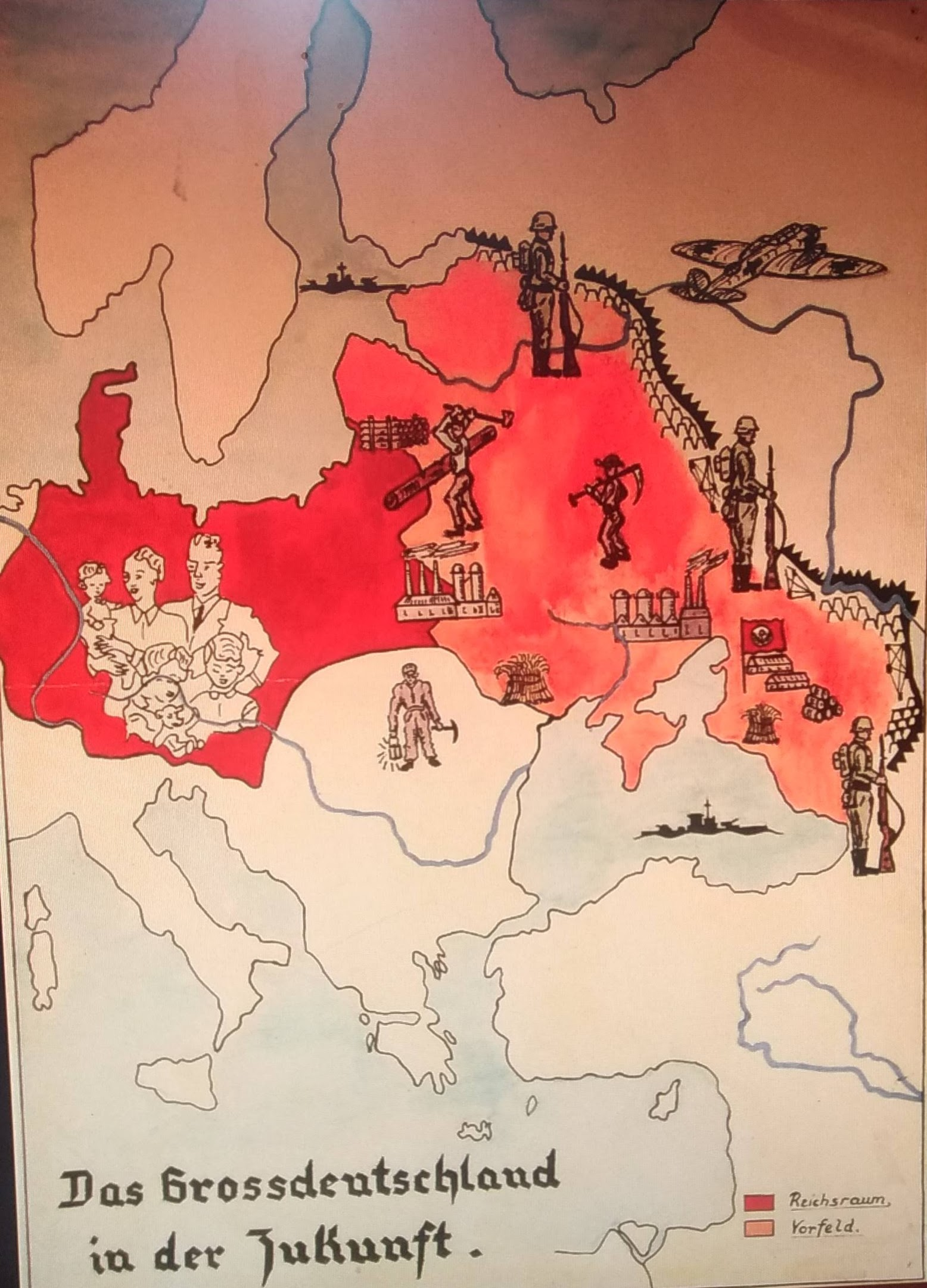
Nazi propaganda map from 1943 depicting occupied Eastern Europe as a settler-colonial territory earmarked for Germanic expansion.

Nazi Germany's expansionist policies in Central and Eastern Europe were closely associated with the concept of Lebensraum ("living space"). Nazi planners envisioned the conquest, racial reorganization, and colonization of large areas of Eastern Europe by Germans and other people considered racially suitable for Germanization. Under Generalplan Ost, Nazi authorities developed plans for the mass deportation, enslavement, Germanization, and extermination of large parts of the region's Slavic and Jewish populations, followed by the settlement of German colonists. Although Generalplan Ost was never implemented in its entirety, elements of the wider programme of population displacement, Germanization, and German settlement were pursued during the World War II.

== Responses ==
Settler colonialism exists in tension with indigenous studies. Some indigenous scholars believe that settler colonialism as a methodology can lead to overlooking indigenous responses to colonialism; however, other practitioners of indigenous studies believe that settler colonialism has important insights that are applicable to their work. Settler colonialism as a theory has also been criticized from the standpoint of postcolonial theory. Antiracism has been criticized on the basis that it does not provide a special status for indigenous claims, and in response settler colonial theory has been criticized for potentially contributing to the marginalization of racialized immigrants.

The term settler has been criticized by Mohamed Adhikari, who says it is euphemistic and it would be more accurate to term them colonists, invaders, or conquerors.

Political theorist Mahmoud Mamdani suggested that settlers could never succeed in their effort to become native, and therefore the only way to end settler colonialism was to erase the political significance of the settler–native dichotomy.

According to Chickasaw scholar Jodi Byrd, in contrast to settler, the term arrivant refers to enslaved Africans transported against their will, and to refugees forced into the Americas due to the effects of imperialism.

In his book Empire of the People: Settler Colonialism and the Foundations of Modern Democratic Thought, political scientist Adam Dahl states that while it has often been recognized that "American democratic thought and identity arose out of the distinct pattern by which English settlers colonized the new world", histories are missing the "constitutive role of colonial dispossession in shaping democratic values and ideals".

== See also ==
- Anabaptist settler colonialism
- European emigration
- Lusotropicalism
- Pre-modern human migration
- Transmigration program
- White legend
