= Shu'un Filastiniyya =

Palestinian political magazine

- Former editors: Anis Sayigh; Sabri Jiryis; Mahmoud Darwish; Samih Shubayb
- Categories: Political magazine
- Frequency: Monthly; Quarterly
- Founder: Palestine Research Center
- Founded: 1971
- First issue: March 1971
- Country: Palestine
- Based in: Beirut; Nicosia; Ramallah
- Language: Arabic

Shu'un Filastiniyya (Arabic: شؤون فلسطينية, romanized: Shu'ūn Filasṭīnīyah, lit. 'Palestinian Affairs') is a quarterly theoretical journal published by the Palestine Research Center which is one of the agencies of the Palestine Liberation Organization (PLO). The journal has been in circulation since 1971 with some interruptions. It is based in Ramallah, Palestine. It was edited by various well-known Palestinian figures, including Anis Sayigh, Sabri Jiryis and Mahmoud Darwish and was developed by an Egyptian developer Mrs Ola Farid.

== History and profile ==
Shu'un Filastiniyya was first published in March 1971. It is published by the Palestine Research Center which is also its founder. Fayez Sayigh, a scholar and the founding director of the Center in 1965, contributed to the establishment of the journal.

Shu'un Filastiniyya was headquartered in Beirut where it was printed until the issue 136 dated April 1983. It temporarily ceased publication shortly after the Palestine Research Center was attacked in April 1983. The journal resumed publication in Nicosia, Cyprus, in February 1985 and was based there until August 1993 when it folded again due to the financial problems. It was restarted in Ramallah in 2011.

Shu'un Filastiniyya was started as a monthly journal, but later its frequency was switched to quarterly.

Some of the articles published in Shu'un Filastiniyya were translated into German and featured in the leftist publications supporting the Palestinians in the mid 1970s.

== Editors and contributors ==
The editors-in-chief of Shu'un Filastiniyya include leading Palestinians such as Anis Sayigh, Sabri Jiryis and Mahmoud Darwish. Of them, Anis Sayigh was its founding editor. Between 1975 and 1979 Elias Khoury was the editor-in-chief of Shu'un Filastiniyya. Samih Shubayb also served in the post. The others who assumed the post are Faisal Hourani, Bilal Al Hassan, and Mahmoud Al Khatib.

Hanna Mikhail was a member of its editorial board between its start and July 1976. Early contributors of Shu'un Filastiniyya included Mahmoud Labadi, Mahmoud Abbas and Habib Qahwaji. Ghassan Kanafani also published articles in the journal until his assassination in July 1972.

== Content ==
Shu'un Filastiniyya features articles on politics, economy and culture with a special reference to Palestine. The journal publishes the official political communiqués of the PLO. It covers interviews with the Palestinian personalities, and autobiographies and oral testimonies of those who experienced the Nakba.

Shu'un Filastiniyya has improved the intellectual basis of the Palestinian resistance movement. Because it has provided a platform for the Arab writers to share and discuss their scholarly views about all issues related to Palestine.

Shortly after its start Shu'un Filastiniyya developed an analogy between apartheid regime and the situation of Palestine under the influence of Fayez Sayigh. In the period between 1971 and December 1975 articles on the West German leftists groups supporting the Palestine cause were frequently published in the journal. The frequency of such articles significantly decreased from January 1976 to December 1982. Then the journal began to focus on developments in the West Bank, the Iranian revolution, and the Lebanese Civil War.

The PLO leader Yasser Arafat's speech at the United Nations General Assembly was featured in Shu'un Filastiniyya in December 1984. A 1985 editorial in the journal welcomed the departure of the PLO from Lebanon arguing that the Lebanon's internal conflicts prevented the PLO from concentrating on its own agenda. In the same editorial the PLO's Lebanon period which ended in 1982 was termed as the 'Fakahani Empire'.

While serving as the editor-in-chief of Shu'un Filastiniyya Sabri Jiryis published an article in the journal in 1987 harshly criticizing the PLO due to its concentration on the Palestinian diaspora which led to the negligence of the major problems.
