= Faisal al-Hourani =

Faisal al-Hourani (Arabic: فيصل الحوراني; 23 March 1939, Al-Masmiyya al-Saghira, Mandatory Palestine – 12 May 2022, Geneva, Switzerland) was a Palestinian writer and journalist who worked for the Palestine Liberation Organization and headed its research division. He has published a number of works of fiction as well as journalism covering Palestinian politics and the history of the Palestinian cause.

== Early life and education ==
He was born 1939 in the village of Al-Masmiyya al-Saghira in the Gaza Subdistrict of Mandatory Palestine. His family fled in the 1948 war to the Gaza Strip then to Damascus. He received his education there and graduated from Damascus University with an bachelor's degree in philosophy, sociology, and psychology in 1964.

== Political activity and journalism ==
He lived in Algeria for a year working in journalism. In 1965, he returned to Damascus and worked as an editor for Al-Ba'ath. He wrote copy for Syrian radio and television programs. In 1962, he joined the Ba'ath Party and remained a member of it until it split. He continued his work as editor-in-chief of the Palestinian political magazine Majallat at-Tala'i' (مجلة الطلائع) until 1970, in addition to serving as a member of the editorial board of Voice of Palestine.

In 1977 and 1978, he served as vice-representative of the PLO in Moscow. He the returned to Damascus, where he headed the Media and Public Relations Department of the PLO's Political Department. In 1979, he worked for the Palestine Research Center in Beirut and soon headed the editing of its publication Shu'un Filastiniyya. Following the 1982 Israeli invasion of Lebanon, he moved with the center's staff to Nicosia in Cyprus.

He represented the General Union of Palestinian Writers and Authors in the Palestinian National Council in Amman in 1984. In 1988, he was made a member of the Palestinian National Council.

In 1989 he moved to Vienna, and in 1995 he returned to Palestine, to the territory under the Palestinian Authority.

== Publications ==
- المحاصرون (novel)، 1973.
- الفكر السياسي الفلسطيني 1964-1974: دراسة في المواثيق الرئيسية لمنظمة التحرير الفلسطينية، 1980.
- سمك اللجة (novel)، منشورات وزارة الثفافة، دمشق، 1983.
- عبد الناصر وقضية فلسطين - قراءة لأفكاره وممارساته، مؤسسة الثقافة الفلسطينية، عكا، 1987.
- جذور الرفض الفلسطيني - 1918-1948، شرق برس، نيقوسيا، 1990.
- دروب المنفى (autobiography in five parts)، مؤسسة الدراسات الفلسطينية، بيروت، 1994- 2004.
- الحنين (novel)، مركز اللاجئين والشتات الفلسطيني، 2004.
- بير الشوم (novel)، المؤسسة العربية للدراسات، بيروت، 2005.
- باولا وأنا، دار التنوير، رام الله، 2022.
- فاطمة، حياتها وموتها، دار التنوير، رام الله، 2022.

== Awards ==
The Palestinian Ministry of Culture awarded him the Palestinian Prize for Autobiography for his Paths of Exile published in parts from 1994 to 2004.
