= Mark Boxer =

British magazine editor

Charles Mark Edward Boxer (19 May 1931 – 20 July 1988) was a British magazine editor and social observer, and a political cartoonist and graphic portrait artist working under the pen-name ‘Marc’.

== Education ==
Boxer was educated at Berkhamsted School, an independent school for boys in Berkhamsted in Hertfordshire. He then attended King's College, Cambridge, where in 1952 he became editor of the student magazine Granta.

During this period, the magazine published a poem deemed by the university authorities to be blasphemous. The Vice-Chancellor demanded Boxer be sent down, the first student since Percy Bysshe Shelley to receive such a sentence for this offence (although Shelley studied at Oxford). E.M. Forster spoke in his defence. His college succeeded in reducing the sentence to a week's rustication during May Week, which would mean that he missed the May Ball. The authorities forgot, however, that May Balls go on into the early hours and, on the stroke of midnight during the Ball, Boxer made a triumphant return.

== Life and career ==
=== Editor ===
Upon leaving Cambridge, Boxer became editor of the small magazine Lilliput, followed by his appointment as Art Director of the society magazine Queen owned by Jocelyn Stevens. In 1962, he became Founding Editor of The Sunday Times Colour Supplement. There he created a format imitated by all UK Sunday broadsheet newspapers, and was responsible for commissioning such leading artists, photographers and writers of the 1960s as Peter Blake, David Hockney, Henri Cartier-Bresson, Don McCullin, Angus Wilson and John Mortimer.

In 1965, Boxer left The Sunday Times but remained within the Thomson Organization, then owners of The Sunday Times, to relaunch the ailing Tatler under a new title of London Life. When that title folded, he returned to The Sunday Times in a reduced role, which gave him time to develop his work as a cartoonist.

After a brief period as a book publisher at Weidenfeld & Nicolson, Boxer accepted the editorship of the revived Tatler at Condé Nast Publications in 1983, for which he won the PA Editor of the Year award in 1986. At the time of his death, he was Editor-in-Chief of Tatler, and editorial director of Condé Nast Publications in the UK.

Boxer's influence as an editor is commemorated in the annual Mark Boxer Award, presented by the British Society of Magazine Editors for an outstanding contribution to magazine publishing in the UK.

=== Cartoonist ===
Drawing under the pen-name 'Marc', Boxer first came to prominence with a regular cartoon Life and Times in NW1, which ran in The Listener from 1968. This satirised the lifestyles of NW1 trendies, as typified in his characters Simon and Joanna Stringalong.

Boxer followed this with the production of a long series of pocket cartoons, single frame social commentaries which were published first in The Times, and subsequently in The Guardian. These were created in collaboration with the humorist George Melly, and led many to consider him the successor to Osbert Lancaster.

=== Profile artist ===
Boxer's profile drawings of celebrated personalities, usually commissioned to accompany a feature profile article, appeared in the New Statesman between 1970 and 1978, and in The Observer between 1982 and 1987. Many are now in the archives of the National Portrait Gallery (London). They also appeared as illustrations to mock-heroic poems written by Clive James. The Fate of Felicity Fark in the Land of the Media (1975) and Britannia Bright's Bewilderment in the Wilderness of Westminster (1976).

Boxer also produced a series of drawings of characters to illustrate the covers of Anthony Powell’s 12-volume novel, A Dance to the Music of Time.

=== Personal life ===
Boxer's first marriage was to Lady Arabella Stuart, youngest daughter of the eighteenth Earl of Moray, with whom he had two children. As Arabella Boxer, she became a successful cookery writer, after Boxer designed her first book, First Slice Your Cookbook, in 1964. They later divorced. His second marriage was to newsreader Anna Ford, with whom he had two children. Boxer was the brother of journalist Rosemary Sayigh, wife of the Palestinian economist Yusif Sayigh.

Boxer died of a brain tumour at home in Brentford, Hounslow, Greater London, in 1988, aged 57.

Media offices
Preceded by Harry Aubrey Fieldhouse	Editor of Tatler; 1965	Succeeded by Ian Howard
Preceded by Libby Purves	Editor of Tatler; 1983–1988	Succeeded by Emma Soames
