= Fayez Sayegh =

Arab-American scholar and civil servant (1922–1980)

- فايز صايغ
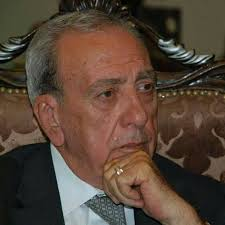
- Born: Fayez Abdullah Sayegh; 1922; Kharaba, Mandatory Syria
- Died: 1980 (aged 57–58); New York City, New York, United States
- Resting place: Beirut, Lebanon
- Education: American University of Beirut; Georgetown University
- Occupations: Academic; Civil servant
- Notable work

Academic work
- Institutions: Macalaster College; American University of Beirut

Fayez Sayegh (Arabic: فايز صايغ; 1922–1980) was an Arab-American diplomat, scholar and teacher. He was a scholar who developed various analyses on the Palestinian opposition movement against Zionism.

== Early life and education ==
Sayegh was born in 1922 in Kharaba, Mandatory Syria, where his father was a Presbyterian minister. He was one of Abdullah Sayigh and Afifa Batruni's six sons, including Yusif Sayigh, Anis Sayigh and Tawfiq Sayigh. He also had a sister, Mary. His father was Syrian and his mother was Palestinian and native of al-Bassa.

As a child, Sayegh moved with his family to Tiberias and went to school in Safed. He received his bachelor's degree from the American University of Beirut (AUB) in 1941 and his master's degree from the same university in 1945. In 1949, he earned his Ph.D. in philosophy, with a minor in political science, from Georgetown University.

== Career ==
Sayegh, along with his brothers who had joined earlier, joined the Syrian Social Nationalist Party in 1943. He was later expelled from the party after Antoun Saadeh returned to Lebanon in 1947, following his exile. After receiving his Ph.D., Sayegh worked for the Lebanese Embassy in Washington DC. He also worked at the United Nations. He taught at a number of universities, including Yale, Stanford, Macalaster College, as well as at his alma mater AUB and at the University of Oxford.

Sayegh established the Palestine Research Center in Beirut in 1965 and served as its director-general for one year. The center published his historical study entitled Zionist Colonialism in Palestine in 1965. His brother, Anes, succeeded Fayez as the director-general of the Palestine Research Center in 1966.

Sayegh was instrumental in the establishment of Shu'un Filastiniyya which was started by the Palestine Research Center in 1971. He was the major contributor of the United Nations General Assembly's Resolution 3379 adopted in 1975. The resolution supported the view that Zionism is a form of racism. After this event he acted as the most visible spokesperson of the Palestinian cause.

Sayegh made several appearances on American television as a commentator on the Israeli–Palestinian conflict.

== Views ==
Sayegh was one of the early scholars who analyzed the negative effects of the sectarianism in Lebanon. For him these effects of sectarianism emerged as a result of the popular life and popular consciousness, not of the historical events. He argued that not only a political change but also a social change should occur for the unified Arab societies.

Sayegh was the first scholar who developed the concept of the Zionist settler colonialism. He argued that Palestinians would never accept "a fraction of rights in a fraction of their homeland." He defined the racial principles of Zionism as self-segregation, exclusiveness, and supremacy which are the elements of segregation. These elements are the central characteristic of apartheid.

He challenged Israel's arguments in the UN, asserting that resolutions regarding occupied territories need not be "two-sided" since there is only one set of occupied territories.

Sayegh and other diplomats and jurists helped bring attention to the Palestinian cause within the framework of international law and human rights.

== Death ==
Sayegh died in New York City in 1980 and was buried in Beirut.

== Bibliography ==
- The Palestine Refugees (1952)
- The Arab-Israel Conflict (1956)
- Arab Unity: Hope and Fulfillment (1958)
- Communism in Israel (1958)
- The Dynamics of Neutralism in the Arab World: A Symposium (1964)
- Zionist Colonialism in Palestine, Research Center, Palestine Liberation Organization (1965)
- The United Nations and the Palestine Question, Facts & Figures Series, No 2, Research Center, Palestine Liberation Organization (1966)
- Discriminations in education against the Arabs in Israel, Facts & Figures Series, No 3, Research Center, Palestine Liberation Organization (1966)
- Palestine, Israel and Peace, Palestine essays, No 17, Research Center, Palestine Liberation Organization (1970)
- A Palestinian view, General Union of Palestinian students (1970)
- The Record of Israel at the United Nations
