= Mahmoud Labadi =

Palestinian journalist and politician (1940–2014)

- محمود اللبدي

Personal details
- Born: Mahmoud Taher Labadi; 1940 Haifa, Mandatory Palestine
- Died: 10 April 2014 (aged 73–74)
- Party: Fatah

Mahmoud Labadi (Arabic: محمود اللبدي; 1940–2014) was a Palestinian journalist, writer and politician who was a long-term spokesman for the Palestine Liberation Organization (PLO). He left the post 1983 and began to work as a journalist until 1995. Then he served in different capacities for the Palestinian National Authority (PNA).

== Early life and education ==
Labadi was born in Haifa in 1940. He obtained his MA in economics in Germany.

== Career and activities ==
Labadi joined the Fatah serving in its foreign relations office from 1974 and later, headed the office. He was among the members of the moderate faction within the Fatah in the late 1970s. He was named as an aide to the PLO Chairman Yasser Arafat in 1974 and remained in the post until 1983. He served as the head of the PLO’s Foreign Information Department in Lebanon between 1975 and 1982. He was appointed spokesperson of the PLO in 1975 which he held until 1983. He also acted as the liaison of the PLO leader Yasser Arafat with the American embassy in Beirut.

Labadi was the editor-in-chief of the PLO publication Palestine Bulletin which was published in English and in French and was distributed in Beirut and in Tunis. He also contributed to another PLO publication Shu'un Filastiniyya in the late 1970s.

The PLO left Beirut in 1982, and Labadi settled briefly in Greece and then in Tunis for one year where the PLO headquarters was based. He retired from politics in 1983 and began to work in media and journalism. From 1984 to 1995 he moved between Paris, Tunis and Damascus. During this period he was one of the opponents of Yasser Arafat and joined the opposition group led by Said al-Muragha which was the first significant opposition group against Arafat. He also acted as the spokesperson of this dissident group.

Labadi was named as the director general of the PNA's Ministry of Economy and Trade in 1995, and his tenure ended in 1997. He was the director of the Aid Coordination and NGO Department at the PNA's Palestinian Economic Council for Development and Reconstruction between 1997 and 1999. His next post was the director general of the Palestinian Legislative Council which he held from 1999 to 2005.

Labadi authored three non-fiction books and two novels.

== Personal life and death ==
Labadi was a father of 4 kids. He died on 10 April 2014.
