= Yusif Sayigh =

Palestinian economist and politician (1916–2004)

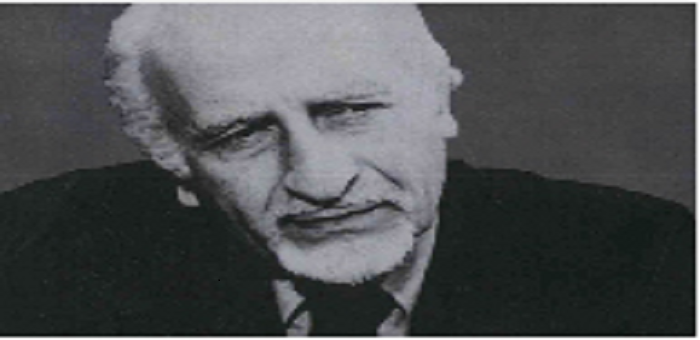
- Born: Yusif Abdullah Sayigh; 1916; Al Bassa, Ottoman Empire
- Died: 2004 (aged 87–88); Beirut, Lebanon
- Occupation: Academic
- Years active: 1950s–1990s
- Title: Professor
- Spouse: Rosemary Sayigh
- Children: 3, including Yezid Sayigh
- Parents: Abdullah Sayigh (father); Afifa Batruni (mother)

Academic background
- Education: American University of Beirut; Johns Hopkins University
- Thesis: Entrepreneurship and development: Private, public and joint entreprise in underdeveloped countries (1957)

Academic work
- Discipline: Economics
- Sub-discipline: Development economics
- Institutions: American University of Beirut

Yusif Sayigh (1916–2004) was a Palestinian economist, academic and politician. He was an Arab nationalist and is known for his academic and practical activities on economic development of Arabs.

== Early life and education ==
Yusif Sayigh was born in al-Bassa, northern Palestine, in 1916. He was the eldest of Abdullah Sayigh and Afifa Batruni's six sons, including Fayez Sayigh, Anis Sayigh and Tawfiq Sayigh. He also had a sister, Mary. His father was a Christian minister from Kharaba, Syria, and his mother was a Palestinian from al-Bassa. Shortly after Yusif's birth, the family moved to back to Kharaba.

When the Great Syrian Revolt occurred in 1925, the family left Kharaba and returned to al-Bassa. In 1930, his father was assigned to a church in Tiberias, where they lived until May 1948, at which point they were expelled by Zionist forces following the proclamation of the State of Israel.

Sayigh went to Sidon at age 13 for high school education and obtained a degree in business administration from American University of Beirut in 1938. During the Arab revolt in Palestine between 1936 and 1939 he began to take part in political activities boycotting the shops run by the Jews and wearing the fez as a symbol of nationalist resistance.

Sayigh received his MA degree from the American University of Beirut in 1952, and his thesis was entitled Economic Implications of UNRWA Operations in Jordan, Syria, and Lebanon. During his university studies he joined the Syrian Social Nationalist Party (SSNP) led by Antoun Saadeh. Sayigh went to the US for the doctorate studies in 1954 when he was awarded a Fulbright scholarship and graduated from Johns Hopkins University in 1957 obtaining a PhD . His PhD thesis was entitled Entrepreneurship and development: Private, public and joint entreprise in underdeveloped countries. It was published with the title Entrepreneurs of Lebanon in 1962.

== Career and activities ==
Sayigh was first employed as a lecturer in Tikrit, Iraq, between 1939 and 1940 after he received a degree in business. He had to return to Tiberias because of his mother's illness and worked at the Tiberias Hotel. Then he became an official in the Bayt al-Mal which was the fund of the Arab Higher Committee. During this period he also headed the Palestinian branch of the SSNP.

At the end of World War II Sayigh involved in the activities to raise funds to buy lands in Palestine to block the Jewish settlement. He was arrested during the 1948 Palestine war, jailed in the Ijlil labor camp and released in 1949. Then he went into exile settling in Beirut and became a Syrian citizen. He left the SSNP criticizing its authoritarian leadership style and its opposition to pan-Arabism in the late 1950s. After he received his PhD from Johns Hopkins University he returned to Beirut and joined the American University of Beirut where he taught courses on development economics and became a professor economics in 1963. In addition, he taught at different universities, including Princeton University, Harvard University and the University of Oxford. Sayigh was the head of the Economic Research Institute of the American University of Beirut from 1962 to 1964. He retired from his university post in 1974.

Sayigh was elected as a member of the Palestinian National Council in 1966. He was the member of the executive committee of the Palestine Liberation Organization (PLO) between 1968 and 1974. He was instrumental in the establishment of the Planning Center in Beirut which he headed between 1968 and 1971. He also served as the treasurer of the PLO's National Fund from 1971 to 1974 and as its official representative to the World Bank. In the 1980s and 1990s he was a member of the PLO's Parliament in-exile.

Sayigh worked as an adviser to the Kuwait's Planning Board between 1964 and 1965 and developed a five-year development plan for the country. He was an economic adviser to the Arab League. He headed the Arab Society for Economic Research between 1992 and 1995. In addition, he was also active in the establishment of the Centre for Arab Unity Studies, the Arab Though Forum based in Jordan and the Economic Research Forum for the Arab Countries based in Iran and Turkey.

=== Work ===
Sayigh published many books and articles which are mostly about economic development of the Arab countries. Some of his books included The Economies of the Arab World (1978), The Arab Economy (1982) and Arab Oil Policies (1983). His 1966 analysis on the value of the property of the Palestinian refugees which they had to abandon in Palestine was the first study on the topic.

Sayigh also wrote a comprehensive report for the PLO entitled The Programme for Development of the Palestinian National Economy 1994–2000 in collaboration with the Palestinian experts.

=== Views ===
Sayigh was an advocate of the heterodox economics based on the public goods and social justice. He argued in 1986 that there could not be any economic development in Palestine under occupation.

For Sayigh the first intifada of Palestinians in 1988 contributed to the global understanding of their struggle for national self-determination and expanded the support for an independent Palestinian state.

== Personal life and death ==
Sayigh was married to scholar Rosemary Sayigh. They met in Beirut and wed at the National Evangelical Church in Beirut on 7 October 1953. They had three children: Joumana, Yezid and Faris. Yezid Sayigh is an academic.

Yusif Sayigh died in Beirut in 2004.

=== Awards ===
Sayigh was the recipient of the prize of the Kuwait Institute for Scientific Research in 1981 and of the Abdullah Tariki Award in 2000.

=== Legacy ===
His wife, Rosemary Sayigh, edited a book on Yusif Sayigh entitled Yusif Sayigh: Arab Economist, Palestinian Patriot. A Fractured Life in 2015.
