= Lorenzo Veracini =

Australian historian

Lorenzo Veracini is a historian and professor at Swinburne University of Technology’s Institute for Social Research.

Veracini was born and grew up in Pisa. He is the editor in chief of Settler Colonial Studies and has been a key figure in the development of the field of settler colonialism. His 2010 book Settler Colonialism: A Theoretical Overview was described as "comprehensive though succinct" and "probably the best justification of the imperative to view settler colonialism as significantly different from traditional or classical colonialism".

== Books ==
- Veracini, Lorenzo (2006). Israel and Settler Society. Pluto Press. ISBN 978-0-7453-2501-9.
- Veracini, Lorenzo (2010). Settler Colonialism: A Theoretical Overview. Springer. ISBN 978-0-230-29919-1.
- Veracini, Lorenzo (2015). The Settler Colonial Present. Springer. ISBN 978-1-137-37247-5.
- Cavanagh, Edward; Veracini, Lorenzo, eds. (2016). The Routledge Handbook of the History of Settler Colonialism. Routledge. ISBN 978-1-134-82854-8.
- Veracini, Lorenzo (2021). The World Turned Inside Out: Settler Colonialism as a Political Idea. Verso Books. ISBN 978-1-83976-384-7.
- Veracini, Lorenzo (2023). Colonialism: a global history. Routledge. ISBN 978-0-367-50638-4.
