= Sabri Jiryis =

Palestinian activist and writer

Sabri Jiryis (Arabic: صبري جريس, Ṣābri Jiryis, Hebrew: סברי ג'ריס; born in 1938 in Palestine), also known as Sabri Jaris, Sabri Geries or Sabri Jirais, is a Palestinian-Arab Israeli writer and lawyer, a graduate of the Hebrew University law faculty, and Palestinian activist. In 1966, the first edition of his book The Arabs in Israel was published in Hebrew.

== Biography ==
Jiryis was born in 1938, in the Palestinian Christian town of Fassuta, Mandatory Palestine.

== Arrest in Israel ==
He was given an "Administrative House Arrest" on 25 April 1969. The order was given by the Chief of the Northern Command, David Elazar and based on Emergency Regulations. According to this order Jiryis was to:

- not live outside the city limits of Haifa,
- not change home within Haifa without police permission,
- not leave the city of Haifa without police permission,
- report to the police every day at 15.45,
- stay in his home from one hour before sunset until dawn.

20 February 1970 he was jailed on another Administrative regulation. In March 1970, Jiryis was one of the initiators of a hunger strike by Palestinian administrative detainees, which attracted wide support, including demonstrations in Israel and across the world. He was allowed to leave Israel later in 1970, and moved to Beirut, Lebanon, where he became director of the Palestine Research Centre.

== PLO activism ==
About 1975, Yasser Arafat sent Jiryis together with Issam Sartawi to Washington, D.C. to open an office to represent the Palestine Liberation Organization (PLO). These two held a series of meetings, among others with people prominent in American Jewish groups in New York and Washington. Rabbi Max Ticktin and Arthur Waskow (both members of "Breira") were among five American Jews at the Washington meeting. According to some sources, Jiryis and Sartawi were within a few hours of holding a press conference to announce the establishment of their new office. However, Henry Kissinger, then the Secretary of State, working in coordination with Yitzhak Rabin, then the Israeli Prime Minister, sent the FBI to the Capitol Hilton Hotel to deport Jiryis and Sartawi.

About the same time, Israeli doves General Mattityahu Peled, Uri Avnery and Arie Eliav had been meeting for months in Paris, France, with Jiryis and Sartawi.

In 1977, Jiryis, as a member of the Palestinian National Council, wrote:

The Palestinians may, in certain circumstances, be ready to seek a settlement in the area to which Israel is a party. But they are not prepared to conclude an agreement recognizing the legitimacy of Zionism; no Palestinian Arab can ever accept as legitimate, a doctrine that he should be excluded from most parts of his homeland, because he is a Muslim Arab or a Christian Arab, while anyone of the Jewish faith from anywhere in the world is entitled to settle there. Realism may require recognition of the existence of a Jewish state in Palestine and that this fact be taken into account in seeking a settlement. But this can never mean approving the expansionist and exclusivist tendencies of Zionism.

During the 1982 Lebanon War, the Palestine Research Centre's historical archives were seized by occupying Israeli forces, but were returned as part of the November 1983 prisoner exchange with the PLO. In February 1983, a saboteur's bomb destroyed the centre; among those killed was Jiryis's wife.

Jiryis moved on to Nicosia, Cyprus, in July 1983. In 1995, after the Oslo Accords, he returned to Israel.

== 2005 arrest of his brother ==
On 7 January 2006, it became known that his brother, Jiryis Jiryis, age 57, a resident of the Christian village of Fassuta, had been arrested on 12 December 2005. The arrest was kept secret by the Israeli military censor until an Acre municipal court judge accepted the Israeli newspaper Haaretz's request to lift a ban on publication of the affair. The Shin Bet security service and the police alleged that Jiryis Jiryis had been recruited by Iranian intelligence during a stay in Cyprus. Sabri Jiryis, acting as his brothers attorney, claimed that the suspicions were baseless. Jiryis said the security services had been tracking his brother for nine months, and that during his interrogation, he was presented with a recording of a phone call during which his brother was heard rejecting the Iranian agents' offer of assistance. "'My brother is a very secular man, affiliated with the PLO's centrist stream, who believes in peace talks and a two-state solution for two nations,' he told Haaretz, and added: "What they are trying to ascribe to him contradicts his political outlook." "During the detention, the police dropped the spy charges initially ascribed to him" Sabri Jiryis added further, and he believed the additional suspicions against his brother would be refuted "because the police have no evidence on the matter."

== Bibliography ==
- Sabri Jiryis: The Arabs in Israel 1969, pp. 1–32
- Sabri Jiryis: The Arabs in Israel 1st American edition 1976 ISBN 0-85345-377-2 (updated from the 1966 ed.) With a foreword by Noam Chomsky. (First English edition; Beirut, Institute for Palestine Studies, 1968) Note: for the Swedish, German, French and Italian translations of this book his name his given as Sabri Geries
- Sabri Jiryis: Democratic Freedoms in Israel. Beirut, 1972. (Institute for Palestine Studies, Monograph Series No. 30)
- Sabri Jiryis: The Foundations of Zionism. translated by Fida Jiryis. Ebb Books, 614 pages. 2025.

== Bibliography, articles (partial) ==
- Jiryis, Sabri: Recent Knesset Legislation and the Arabs in Israel, in Journal of Palestine Studies, 1, no. 1 (Aut. 1971): 53–67.
- Jiryis, Sabri: The Legal Structure for the Expropriation and Absorption of Arab Lands in Israel, in Journal of Palestine Studies, 2, no. 4 (Sum. 1973): 82–104.
- Jiryis, Sabri: No Peace in Israel, interview in Journal of Palestine Studies, 4, no. 4 (Sum. 1975): 26–40.
- Jiryis, Sabri: On Political Settlement in the Middle East: The Palestinian Dimension in Journal of Palestine Studies, 7, no. 1 (Aut. 1977): 3-25.
- Jiryis, Sabri: Israeli Rejectionism in Journal of Palestine Studies, 8, no. 1 (Aut. 1978): 61–84.
- Jiryis, Sabri: The Arab World at the Crossroads: The Opposition to Sadat, in Journal of Palestine Studies, 7, no. 2 (Win. 1978): 26–61.
- Jiryis, Sabri: The Arabs in Israel, 1973-79, in Journal of Palestine Studies, 8, no. 4 (Sum. 1979): 31–56.
- Jiryis, Sabri: Secrets of State: An Analysis of the Diaries of Moshe Sharett, in Journal of Palestine Studies, 10, no. 1 (Aut. 1980): 35–57.
- Jiryis, Sabri: Domination by the Law, in Journal of Palestine Studies, 11, no. 1 (Aut. 1981): 67–92.
- Jiryis, Sabri: Forty Years since the Seizure of Palestine, in Journal of Palestine Studies, 18, no. 1 (Aut. 1988): 83–95.

== See also ==
- Arab citizens of Israel
