= Yezid Sayigh =

Palestinian historian (born 1955)

- يزيد صايغ
- Born: 1955 (age 70–71)
- Title: Senior fellow
- Parent(s): Yusif Sayigh, Rosemary Sayigh

Academic background
- Education: American University of Beirut (BSc); King's College London (PhD, 1987)

Academic work
- Institutions: Malcolm H. Kerr Carnegie Middle East Center

Yezid Sayigh (Arabic: يزيد صايغ; born 1955) is a Palestinian academic. He is a senior fellow at the Carnegie Middle East Center in Beirut, Lebanon. Previously, he was a professor of Middle East Studies at the Department of War Studies at King's College London, a member of the Academic Board of the Gulf Research Center, and a member of the board of trustees of the Palestinian Center for Policy and Survey Research (PCPSR). From 1994 to 2003, he was the assistant director of studies at the Centre of International Studies at Cambridge University. Sayigh also headed the Middle East Research Programme of the International Institute for Strategic Studies (IISS) in London from 1998 to 2003. Sayigh was a negotiator of the 1994 Gaza–Jericho Agreement between the Palestine Liberation Organisation and Israel. He headed the Palestinian delegation to the Multilateral Working Group on Arms Control and Regional Security (1992-1994), and was a MacArthur Scholar and Research Fellow at St Antony's College, Oxford (1990-1994). From 2005 to 2006, Sayigh was a visiting professor at the faculty of Political Studies and Public Administration at the American University of Beirut.

== Biography ==
Sayigh's father, economist Yusif Sayigh (1916–2004), was born in al-Bassa, Palestine during the end of the Ottoman Empire period. His mother is British-born anthropologist and oral historian Rosemary Sayigh.

Sayigh obtained a BSc in chemistry from the American University of Beirut, and a PhD in War Studies from King's College London. He has also conducted research at the Dayan Center at Tel Aviv University. He speaks Arabic, English and French.

== Selected works ==
Books:

- Armed Struggle and the Search for a State: The Palestinian National Movement, 1949-1993. Oxford University Press. 1997. ISBN 0-19-829265-1.
- The Third World Beyond the Cold War: Continuity and Change. Oxford University Press. 1999. ISBN 0-19-829551-0. (with Louise L'Estrange Fawcett)
- The Cold War and the Middle East. Oxford University Press. 1997. ISBN 0-19-829099-3. (with Avi Shlaim)

He has written numerous articles for national newspapers, academic and policy journals:

- A political minefield (2007), The Guardian
- The PLO and the Palestinian Armed Struggle

Public lectures:

- Different Yet Similar: Governance in the West Bank and Gaza
