= Patrick Wolfe =

Australian historian (1949–2016)

- Born: 1949; Yorkshire, England
- Died: 18 February 2016 (aged 66–67); Melbourne, Australia
- Occupation: Historian

Academic background
- Education: University of Melbourne (BA, PhD); London School of Economics (MSc)
- Doctoral advisor: Dipesh Chakrabarty

Academic work
- Institutions: Victoria University, Melbourne, La Trobe University
- Main interests: Aboriginal history
- Influenced: Settler colonial studies

Patrick Wolfe (1949 – 18 February 2016) was an English historian and scholar who lived and wrote in Australia.

Born into an Irish Catholic and German Jewish family in Yorkshire, England, his works are credited with establishing the field of settler colonial studies. He also made significant contributions to several academic fields, including anthropology, genocide studies, Indigenous studies, and the historiography of race, colonialism, and imperialism.

== Biography ==
Wolfe was born to an Irish Catholic and German Jewish family in Yorkshire where he received a Jesuit education. In the 1970s he collaborated with Sibnarayan Ray and Greg Dening as an undergraduate. Along with Maurice Bloch, he began his post-graduate studies in social anthropology at the London School of Economics and Political Science. He then went on to pursue his doctorate with Greg Dening under the supervision of Dipesh Chakrabarty. As a doctoral student he taught Aboriginal history at the University of Melbourne. He was associated with a number of universities in Australia as a teacher and researcher, including Victoria University and La Trobe University. Wolfe held fellowships at Harvard and Stanford among other places. He never held an academic tenure or a permanent university position. His research spanned race and colonialism around the world.

Wolfe's home was Healesville on Wurundjeri country. At his memorial service, Wurundjeri Elder Aunty Joy Murphy Wandin described Wolfe as a cherished friend of the Wurundjeri.

== Works ==
Monographs

- Settler Colonialism and the Transformation of Anthropology (1999)
- Traces of History: Elementary Structures of Race (2016)

Edited collections

- The Settler Complex: Recuperating Binarism in Colonial Studies (editor Patrick Wolfe, 2016)
- Sovereignty: Frontiers of Possibility, co-edited by Julie Evans, Ann Genovese, Alexander Reilly, and Patrick Wolfe (2012)

Academic articles

- "Land, Labor, and Difference: Elementary Structures of Race" in The American Historical Review 106, no. 3 (2001): 866–905.
- "Settler colonialism and the elimination of the native" in Journal of Genocide Research, no. 8 (2006): 387–409.
