= Steven E. Zipperstein =

American attorney

- Occupations: Jewish studies scholar; historian
- Known for: Work on Russian Jewish history

Steven E. Zipperstein ("Steve Zipperstein") is an attorney, and a lecturer in history at University of California, Santa Barbara. He is also a Senior Fellow at the UCLA Center for Middle East Development, and a visiting professor at the Tel Aviv University Law School. He is the author of several books and other publications on the legal status of Palestine and Jerusalem.

== Education ==
He received a B.A. in political science at the University of California at Los Angeles in 1979, and J.D. from the University of California at Davis in 1983.

== Career ==
Zipperstein was initially a prosecutor in the United States Attorney's office in Los Angeles, and then Chief Legal Officer for Verizon Wireless from 2003 to 2011, and subsequently Chief Legal Officer for Blackberry Ltd.

In 2020 Zipperstein published a newly discovered document in which Mohammed Ali Tewfik, Regent of Egypt during the minority of Farouk of Egypt, responded to the 1929 Palestine riots at Jerusalem's Western Wall by proposing that "instead of fighting or dealing unjustly by one party or the other, it would be infinitely better to come to an understanding. The Mohametans may be willing to accept a sum of money which would help them to do good for the community and as the Jews are rich, if this thing (the Wailing Wall) is so much desired by them, there seems no reason why they should not pay for it. If this could be done, it would avoid coercion and possibly injustice to one or other of the parties... Let them give £100,000 and I feel sure this would settle the difference."

== Publications ==
=== Books ===
- Zionism, Palestinian Nationalism and the Law: 1939-1948 (Routledge, 2021) ISBN 1032125845, 978-1032125848
- Law and the Arab-Israeli Conflict: The Trials of Palestine (Routledge, 2020) ISBN 036743508X ISBN 978-0367435080

=== Journal Articles ===
- Comparative Fault and Intentional Torts: Doctrinal Barriers and Policy Considerations (1984)
- Models of Israeli Social Analysis (1981)
