= Palestine Research Center =

Institute established in Beirut in 1965

The Palestine Research Center (PRC), or the PLO Research Center, was an institute established in Beirut in 1965 by the Palestine Liberation Organization to gather, conserve and analyse books and materials relating to Palestine, its culture and modern history, and to the political struggles of the Palestinian people. It suffered damage from several attacks before a car bomb placed by an Israel proxy terrorist group, the Front for the Liberation of Lebanon from Foreigners, destroyed the building in 1983. It was under diplomatic protection. (Note: 'the Center quickly gained the blessing of the Lebanese government, which granted it the status of a diplomatic body and provided it the immunities offered to foreign diplomatic delegations.' (Gribetz 2017, pp. 94–95))

The PRC is organized into research departments specializing in Palestinian, Israeli, and international affairs. Since its establishment, it has published more than 1,000 books and periodicals, in addition to thousands of studies and policy papers. Among its principal publications are the annual Palestinian Diaries (issued since 1965) and the quarterly journal Shuʾun Filastiniyya. The Center also maintains a specialized library dedicated to Palestinian studies, holding more than 20,000 volumes in multiple languages, as well as an archive containing a substantial collection of documents and manuscripts related to the Palestinian question.

== History ==
The PLO Research Center was established in 1965, one year after the establishment of the PLO (Palestine Liberation Organization) itself, as both a research and educational institution. The decision to found it was taken on 28 February of that year by the PLO executive committee, and its first director was Fayiz Sayigh. It occupied 6 floors of a 7-storey building on Colombani Street (officially Rue al-Labbân) in the residential Hamra district of West Beirut and was accorded diplomatic protection by the Lebanese government. (Note: 'the Center quickly gained the blessing of the Lebanese government, which granted it the status of a diplomatic body and provided it the immunities offered to foreign diplomatic delegations.' (Gribetz 2017, pp. 94–95)) The purpose was to gather materials, books, articles and publications bearing on Palestinian history, society culture and politics – both Israeli and Palestinian. It also published a quarterly, Shu'un Filastiniyya ("Palestinian Affairs") and Al-Watha’iq Al-Filastiniyya (The Palestinian Documents) from 1971 onwards. By 1982 it had built a substantial library of some 25,000 volumes in English, Arabic and Hebrew, together with a microfilm collection, forming a repository of Palestinian archives, what the center's director stated was perhaps 'the world's largest collections of manuscripts on the question of Palestine.' Courses in Hebrew were also taught.

At its peak, at least 40 researchers (Note: Rona Sela states that it had 80 researchers (Sela 2018, p. 204).) were employed, who produced, mainly in Arabic but also in French and English, over 300 publications. The researchers were supported by a further 40 personnel. Anis Sayigh, a Lebanese Palestinian who had obtained a doctorate from Cambridge University in Middle Eastern Studies in 1964, (Note: According to Jadaliyya, Sayigh had been 'the target of several assaults by Israeli intelligence while he headed the research center. The center was also subject to these Israeli attacks during this period as it suffered a bomb explosion in 1971. In 1972, and after several months had passed since Ghassan Kanafani's assassination, a parcel bomb exploded in Sayigh's hands. His finger had to be amputated and he suffered from hearing impairment. In late 1974, the center was hit with rockets which caused severe material damage. Submitted his resignation from the research center in February 1976 where it was turned down until March of the following year.' (Jadaliyya 2014)) replaced his brother Fayiz as director in 1966, a position he held until 1977. He submitted his resignation in 1976, but stayed on to direct the institute for another year until his successor, Sabri Jiryis appointed that year, could relieve him. Jiryis, a Hebrew-speaking Palestinian with a degree in law from Hebrew University, had left Israel in 1970 after being subjected to two successive periods of administrative detention. In the period of transition, the center was run by the Palestinian poet Mahmoud Darwish (1977-1978). At the time its contents were plundered, Constantin Zureiq, professor emeritus at the American University of Beirut, presided as chairman of the institute's board while Dr. Walid Khalidi, a visiting professor at Harvard University, was secretary.

As Israeli troops during the second Israeli invasion of Lebanon prepared to enter Beirut. Jiryis, anticipating the risk of seizure, had the Center's collection of rare and highly valuable documents, and all files pertaining to sensitive information, such as personnel files, packed away in two suitcases (Note: 'We prepared for the IDF's entry into the city, and our departure. It was September 1982. The PLO organization was enormous and we weren't able to take anything. A day before the IDF's entry into the city, when it was known that the first Israeli soldiers had entered the adjacent street, I arrived at the Center at night and took important materials – mainly manuscripts – memories of Palestinian figures I didn't want lost, political reports and assessments. They remained with me, out of the reach of Israel's soldiers…that's the real archive. Not what the IDF took. I put the material into two suitcases and kept them in a secure place.' (Sela 2018, p. 219)) and later shipped out to safety from Lebanon. When the invasion got underway, the PRC was targeted in two earlier car bombings, in July and August 1982. On 13 July, a car in a parking lot next to the Center exploded, but caused only minor damage. On 18 August, PLO officers detected another car packed with explosives parked in front, and managed to evacuate people from the vicinity before it exploded and wounded 4 people.

In September it was then occupied by Israeli soldiers for a week, and then was subsequently ransacked: filing cabinets, desks and other furniture were smashed, a strong box was rifled to take its contents, and telephones, heaters, electric fans, a printing press and other fixtures were also stolen. This operation was part of a broader strategy of gathering documents from all PLO offices the IDF raided in Lebanon. On 15 September the contents of its library and microfilm collections were loaded onto three trucks (Note: Interviewed, the Israeli photo journalist Shlomo Arad stated: "I arrived in the late morning; the weather was good, September – still summer. A chain of soldiers, a slight distance from one another, were passing crates taken from the archive from hand to hand, until they were loaded onto the trucks. There were two trucks standing outside. The army forbade me to take photographs, but after much arguing it was agreed I could photograph the soldiers from the rear. I photographed the human chain but again the army intervened and that particular photograph was censored. They never returned it to me. They only allowed me to publish the image that I gave you, where you can't identify the soldiers or the actual plundering." (Sela 2018, p. 220)) and shipped to Israel. One Israeli soldier engaged in trucking away the archive, noticing a blackboard in a room with Hebrew writing on it, left a message by chalking "You're screwed!" on it. Many documents were selectively used by Israel to construct a narrative that cast Palestinians as terrorists and the IDF invasion as one that liberated Lebanon. (Note: Sleiman instances the volume PLO in Lebanon by the Israeli historian Raphael Israeli, published in 1983, as a case in point.(Sleiman 2016, p. 48))

A further set of at least 120 films and documentaries was collected in Beirut and confiscated but the 'PLO archives' from which the materials had been looted has not been identified. The collection is now housed in Tel Aviv and is difficult to access. On the departure of the Israelis, and subsequent to the PLO exodus, it became the sole remaining PLO institution in Lebanon. The material lost was estimated at $1.5 million, but most of the manuscripts were irreplaceable. Jiryis accused Israel of 'plunder(ing) our Palestinian cultural heritage.' Jiryis quickly set about reordering books – his file cards for Hebrew publications alone were 10 inches high (Note: In an interview later, Jirsis stated that it was rather "childish" for Israel to loot and confiscate the Center's collection of books that had been published in Israel and were readily available in bookshops there (Jiryis & Qallab 1985, p. 186).) – in order to rebuild the lost collection.

== Research on Zionism and the Pittsburgh Platform ==
The PLO's Beirut Research center was particularly fascinated by a statement drawn up in 1885 by a group of Reform Judaism rabbis.

"We consider ourselves no longer a nation, but a religious community and therefore expect neither a return to Palestine, nor a sacrificial worship under the sons of Aaron, nor the restoration of any of the laws concerning the Jewish state".

This declaration became known as the Pittsburgh Platform, a formulation later developed by Elmer Berger in his critiques of Zionism.

The words in the Pittsburgh Platform were adopted almost verbatim in the foundational document of the PLO, namely the Palestinian National Covenant. In the Palestinian reading of Jewish tradition, this document was taken as proof that the rabbinical authorities admitted that Jews were not a nation but citizens of the states where they belonged, and thus Judaism itself was a religion, not a project for nation-building or territorial repossession of the Holy Land. By this time however Reform Judaism had officially disavowed the statement because of its implicit anti-Zionism, and had replaced it with the Columbus Platform (1937).

== February 1983 car bombing ==
At 2 pm on February 5th, 1983, a car bomb equivalent to 150 kilograms of TNT exploded in the street outside of the Center. The impact of the explosion was huge, rattling windows and shaking buildings throughout West Beirut, while engulfing pedestrians, drivers and shoppers who happened to be in the vicinity. The car bomb gutted the entire building housing the Center, killing Jiryis's wife Hanneh Shahin, who had dropped in for a visit just before its weekend closing. Three people who were caught in its elevator at the time died of asphyxiation from smoke inhalation after being trapped inside. The concierge and a telephone operator were also killed. In total as many as 20 people were killed by the explosion, most of whom died immediately.

Shafiq al-Hout, the PLO diplomatic representative, had a temporary office in the building after the Lebanese Army closed the P.L.O.'s Beirut mission in September. He survived by happening to be home at the time of the explosion.

After the extensive raiding of PLO offices and institutions in 1982 and the confiscating of documents, researchers scoured the sites to retrieve whatever material had been missed and, once collected, the material was deposited on one floor of the building, at the Planning Center office. All of these files were destroyed in the explosion.

== Aftermath ==
The material taken, according to the director of the Research Center, related to historical information on Arab families and villages in pre-1948 Palestine. Israeli officials argued that the PLC was more an intelligence gathering organization than an academic center, (Note: Jiryis stated that, aside from the books, 3,000 alone regarding 'the Zionist entity' the documents collected held no secrets: 'the documents do not contain any secrets pertaining either to the activities of the PLO or to the activities of friendly or adversary forces. They simply include valuable collections of old British, Ottoman, Israeli and Arab documents pertaining to the Arab-Israeli conflict dating from the last several decades.' (Jiryis & Qallab 1985, p. 186)) and that the data could be exploited to plan terrorist raids into Israel. As negotiations got underway, the PLO, at Jiryis's insistence that the archive be treated as a prisoner of war, included as a condition for a prisoner exchange with the Israelis, the restitution of the expropriated archives. On 24 November 1983 6 Israelis and 5,000 POWs were exchanged together with what Israel stated was the PLO archive. (Note: 'In spite of conditions in Beirut, the PLO's Palestine Research Center and the unaffiliated Institute for Palestine Studies produced some significant research until Israel's 1982 invasion disrupted their functioning, and indeed much Palestinian intellectual production. The Center's historical archives were seized by occupying Israeli forces, but were returned as part of the November 1983 prisoner exchange with the PLO.' (Khalidi 1988, p. 229, n.1)) Israel had copied the archive, after which it was recreated in 100 boxes and dispatched, under the auspices of the International Red Cross, to Algeria. Since Israel had also stolen the PRC's inventory of its holdings, it proved impossible to verify whether the total contents of the center had been handed back or not. Rona Sela, through the offices of Michael Sfard, managed in 2008 to obtain a confirmation from the IDF that many of the spoils seized in Beirut at that period still remained in the IDF archives in Tel Aviv.

A month after the exchange, on 19 December, Resolution 38/180B of the 38th United Nations General Assembly, with 121 votes in favour, 1 against, and 20 abstentions, condemned Israel for having seized and removed the archives and documents. (Note: The resolution 'called upon the Government of Israel "to make full restitution, through the United Nations Educational, Scientific and Cultural Organization, of all cultural properties belonging to Palestinian institutions, including the archives and documents removed from the Palestine Research Centre and arbitrarily seized by the Israeli forces".' (Unispal 1984))

The Algerian military transported the consignment firstly to al-Kharruba, and then to the Tébessa military base. The final destination proved to be the El Bayadh base in the Algerian desert close to the border with Tunisia. This third shift was dictated by precautions after the Israeli air force destroyed the PLO's headquarters in Hammam al-Shatt, Tunisia on 1 October 1985. Due to internal squabbles among the PLO leaders, -Arafat wanted it relocated in Cairo, Abu Iyad in Algiers – the boxes were left in this final location and remain to this day, apparently, in Algeria. Whether it has remained intact or not, given poor storage and extremities of rain, heat and rats, is unknown. One report states that it has been destroyed by a combination of these effects, and neglect. According to Sleiman, the new archive established by the Palestinian National Authority, lacking the reincorporation of the Liberation Movement's archive of the PLO's early days, will memorialize the records of the Palestinian people as those of the nascent state, and not the experience of its earlier revolutionary years. (Note: 'Once again the archive's creator and captor are at odds. In this case, however, the creator has metamorphosed into the captor, the revolution has metamorphosed into the state, and the Research Center's archive was lost. A consequence of the loss is the inability to tell stories using its sources. Such stories could be of the PLO as a rogue actor, a resistance movement, or a precursor to a state.' (Sleiman 2016, pp. 60, 61))

Jiryis set out to rebuild the collection from the damage sustained. After Israel restored the looted materials, the building was again bombed by Lebanese groups, killing or wounding several staff members, and damaging the structure. Negotiations with states in the area to relocate failed, so the Center subsequently relocated provisorily to Nicosia, Cyprus, pending negotiations with the Egyptian government aiming to receive permission to rebuild the center in Cairo. Jiryis continued to operate the center in Nicosia until his return to his native village of Fassuta in northern Israel in 1992. He endeavoured to re-establish a Research Center in East Jerusalem but those archives too were again confiscated when Israeli police raided and in August 2001 closed down the PLO's headquarters in Orient House, on whose grounds, since 1983, the Arab Studies Society, founded by Faisal al-Husseini to document the Arab history of Palestine, had been housed. (Note: 'the (East Jerusalem) archive was moved to containers in Beit Shemesh. Since the area suffers from extreme climate changes, the material is therefore under the risk of physical devastation.' (Sela 2018, p. 207)) Thus Jiryis's attempts to document Palestinian history were subject to two confiscations, in Beirut and, two decades later, in East Jerusalem.

Antoon de Baetz classifies Israel's confiscation or destruction of Palestinian documents as an example of the censorship of historical thought practiced by many nations. The Israeli scholar Rona Sela views these incidents as part of an ongoing policy or practice since the 1930s to appropriate, conceal and thereby exercise control over Palestinian representations of their historical experience. (Note: 'The challenge for researchers of colonial archives..is therefore.. to decipher the distorted history manufactured by the colonizer..Palestinian archives and images were systematically and deliberately plundered/looted by Jewish/Israeli military entities or by civilians who had internalized the codes of power, and deposited in official Israeli archives. Subsequently, Israel becomes a central source of information about the Palestinians.' (Sela 2018, p. 206)) She further argues that there is a double standard in Israeli society regarding heritage: a consensus exists that valued properties seized in WW2 must be returned to their Jewish owners, but this ethical code is not applied to Palestinian treasures which Israel has seized as booty. (Note: 'Israeli society lives by a dichotomous code of ethics. On the one hand, there is consensus on returning treasures seized by the Nazis to their Jewish owners, and the subject is rarely off the public agenda. On the other hand, this ethical code is not applied regarding the question of the restitution of Palestinian treasures that have been taken as booty by Israel.' (Sela 2018, p. 224))

== Sources ==
- Aderet, Ofer (1 July 2017). "Why are countless Palestinian photos and films buried in Israeli archives?". Haaretz.
- "Anis Sayigh: A Profile from the Archives". Jadaliyya. Arab Studies Institute. 3 August 2014.
- de Baets, Antoon (2002). Censorship of Historical Thought: A World Guide, 1945-2000. Greenwood Publishing Group. ISBN 978-0-313-31193-2.
- Denton, Herbert H. (6 February 1983). "18 Die as Car Bomb Hits PLO Beirut Office". The Washington Post.
- Friedman, Thomas (6 February 1983). "18 die in bombings at P.L.O.'s Center in Western Beirut". The New York Times.
- Glock, Albert (Spring 1994). "Archaeology as Cultural Survival: The Future of the Palestinian Past". Journal of Palestine Studies. 23 (3): 70–84. doi:10.2307/2537961. JSTOR 2537961.
- Gribetz, Jonathan Marc (Winter 2017). "The PLO's Rabbi: Palestinian Nationalism and Reform Judaism". The Jewish Quarterly Review. 107 (1): 90–112. doi:10.1353/jqr.2017.0003. JSTOR 90000706. S2CID 152173707.
- Hijazi, Ihsan A. (1 October 1982). "Israeli looted archives of P.L.O. officials say". The New York Times. Archived from the original on 17 July 2014.
- Hudson, Michael C. (1 October 1972). "Foreign Research Report: Research Facilities in Lebanon". Middle East Studies Association Bulletin. 6 (3): 17–25. doi:10.1017/S002631840005361X. JSTOR 23058381. S2CID 157634870.
- Jiryis, Sabri; Qallab, Salah (Summer 1985). "The Palestine Research Center". Journal of Palestine Studies. 14 (4): 185–187. doi:10.1525/jps.1985.14.4.00p0229j. JSTOR 2537147.
- Khalidi, Rashid (1988). "Palestinian Peasant Resistance to Zionism Before World War I". In Said, Edward W.; Hitchens, Christopher (eds.). Blaming the Victims: Spurious Scholarship and the Palestinian Question. Verso. pp. 207–233. ISBN 0-86091-175-6.
- Masalha, Nur (2012). The Palestine Nakba: Decolonising History, Narrating the Subaltern, Reclaiming Memory. Zed Books. ISBN 978-1-848-13970-1.
- Oren, Amir (20 May 2016). "Meir Dagan's Most Daring War Was the One He Helped Prevent". Haaretz.
- Rubin, Trudy (10 February 1983). "The fall of the PLO's 'state within state' in Lebanon". The Christian Science Monitor.
- Rubinstein, Danny (13 August 2001). "The Rise and Fall of Orient House". Haaretz. Archived from the original on 6 February 2021.
- Schiff, Ze'ev (Summer 1985). "The Prisoner Exchange". Journal of Palestine Studies. 14 (4): 176–180. doi:10.1525/jps.1985.14.4.00p0226g. JSTOR 2537144.
- Sela, Rona (March 2018). "The Genealogy of Colonial Plunder and Erasure – Israel's Control over Palestinian Archives". Social Semiotics. 28 (2): 201–229. doi:10.1080/10350330.2017.1291140. S2CID 149369385 – via ResearchGate.
- Shipler, David K. (24 November 1983a). "6 Israelis Freed in Prisoner Pact with the P.L.O". The New York Times.
- Shipler, David K. (25 November 1983b). "Palestinians and Israelis Welcome their Prisoners Freed in Exchange". The New York Times.
- "The Situation of the Middle East A/39/533". Unispal. 2 October 1984.
- Sleiman, Hana (Spring 2016). "The Paper Trail of a Liberation Movement". Arab Studies Journal. 26 (1): 42–67.
