= Anis Sayigh =

- أنيس صايغ
- Born: November 3, 1931; Tiberias, Palestine
- Died: December 25, 2009 (aged 78); Amman

Academic work
- Discipline: History

Anis Sayigh (Arabic: أنيس صايغ November 3, 1931 - December 25, 2009) was an Arab Palestinian historian. He chaired the Palestine Research Center and was one of the main driving forces behind the Palestinian Encyclopedia. He was the target of an Israeli assassination attempt in 1972, receiving a letter bomb which resulted in a partial loss of his eyesight and loss of several fingers.

== Biography ==
Anis Sayigh was born in 1931 in Tiberias, Palestine to a Syrian Father and a Palestinian mother. His father was an Anglican minister. After the 1948 Arab-Israeli War, his family fled to Sidon, Lebanon, where he went to high school. He had five brothers, including Yusif Sayigh and Tawfiq Sayigh, and a sister, Mary.

Sayigh studied political science at the American University of Beirut and received his bachelor's degree in 1953. After graduating, he wrote for Al-Hayat and Arab Week, and published his first book Lubnan at-Ta'ifi (Sectarian Lebanon). He received his PhD from the University of Cambridge in political science and Arab history, and later taught at Cambridge in the Oriental Studies department. He returned to Beirut in 1964 and edited the English-Arabic dictionary. In 1966, Sayigh met Ahmad Shukeiri, head of the Palestine Liberation Organization, and promoted the idea of establishing a Palestinian encyclopedia, and was appointed as the head of the PLO's Palestine Research Center succeeding his brother Fayez Sayigh. Anis Sayigh also edited the journal of the Center entitled Shu'un Filastinyya. He died in an Amman hospital on December 25, 2009.
