= Rosemary Sayigh =

British-Palestinian journalist and writer (born 1927)

- Born: Rosemary Boxer; 15 March 1927 (age 99); Birmingham, United Kingdom
- Education: University of Oxford; American University of Beirut; University of Hull
- Occupations: Journalist; Social anthropologist
- Notable work: Palestinians: From Peasants to Revolutionaries; A People’s History (1979)
- Spouse: Yusif Sayigh
- Children: Yezid Sayigh

Rosemary Sayigh (née: Boxer; born 1927) is a British-born journalist and scholar of Middle Eastern history. She is known for her works on the Palestinian people, particularly those forcibly displaced to Lebanon as a result of the Nakba.

== Personal life ==
Sayigh was born on 15 March 1927 in the United Kingdom as Rosemary Boxer. She is the elder sister of Mark Boxer, a British journalist. Sayigh met her future husband, Yusif Sayigh, while she was working in Baghdad, Iraq as a teacher. The couple married at the National Evangelical Church in Beirut, Lebanon on 7 October 1953. The couple had four children, including scholar Yezid Sayigh.

During the 2006 Lebanon War, Sayigh evacuated from her home in Beirut to stay with her daughter in Cyprus.

== Education ==
Sayigh graduated from the University of Oxford with a Bachelor of Arts in English Language and Literature in 1948.

She began her MA in sociology and anthropology from the American University of Beirut in 1970. Sayigh's masters' thesis was about the experience of Palestinians displaced to Lebanon, based on research and interviews undertaken at refugee camps in or near Beirut. The thesis was accepted in 1976 despite resistance from her thesis advisor, thanks to intervention from a Palestinian history professor at the University.

Sayigh received a PhD in social anthropology from the University of Hull in 1994.

== Career ==
=== Early Career, 1948-1952 ===
After graduating from the University of Oxford in 1948, Sayigh moved to Italy, first working as an au pair and then as an assistant at a British Institute Library. On her return to London a year later, she struggled to find employment, eventually getting a position at the advertising agency J. Walter Thompson.

=== Baghdad, 1952-1953 ===
In 1952, Sayigh's friend Desmond Stewart found her a teaching job at Queen Aliya College in Baghdad, Iraq. Stewart was a classical scholar teaching in Baghdad at the College of Arts and Sciences at the same time. Sayigh taught at Queen Aliya College for two years, overlapping on the faculty with Palestinian novelist and painter Jabra Ibrahim Jabra.

=== Journalism ===
In Beirut, Sayigh began working as a journalist. Through visits with her mother-in-law's cousin, Sayigh began interviewing the residents of Dbayeh camp and sharing the interviews in articles for Kayhan Weekly, the Journal of Palestine Studies, and later The Economist. Sayigh stopped writing for The Economist in 1970, when she left due to disapproval of the magazine's "uncritical, pro-American position on the Vietnam War."

=== Political Organising ===
In 1967, Sayigh was a founding member of The Fifth of June Society, an NGO established in Beirut to combat anti-Arab content in Western media. The society was named to commemorate the date on which the Six-Day War began. The society shared information about Palestine and the Palestinian resistance movement. Interested journalists were welcomed, taken on tours of refugee camps in Beirut and given information packs about Palestine. The society also aimed to connect with pro-Palestinian groups across the world.

=== Academia ===
In 1979, her first book Palestinians: From Peasants to Revolutionaries; A People's History was published by Zed Press. The original cover photo was taken by Don McCullin. The first edition of the book included an introduction by Noam Chomsky, who also wrote the foreword to the 2007 edition.

Between 1983 and 1993, Sayigh worked with Palestinian women in camps in Lebanon, including Shatila refugee camp, on an oral history project. In 1993, her second book, Too Many Enemies: The Palestinian Experience in Lebanon was published, also by Zed Books. In 1999, she won an award from the Diana Tamari Sabbagh Foundation to travel through Palestine and record women's accounts of displacement. This work forms the basis of "Palestinian Women Narrate Displacement: A Web-based Oral Archive", recorded in Arabic. Sayigh presented a lecture version of the archive to the 15th International Oral History Association Conference in Prague, Czech Republic in July 2010.

She has been an unofficial supervisor to several PhD candidates researching Palestinian social and political history. Her areas of interest include gender and politics; the political responsibility of the researcher; memory and identity; and culture and resistance. In 2000, she became a visiting lecturer in oral history and anthropology at the Center for Arab and Middle Eastern Studies (CAMES) at the American University of Beirut.

=== Recognition ===
In 2009, the Journal of Palestine Studies published a special issue in honour of Sayigh's work, including an article entitled "A Tribute Long Overdue". In 2017, Sherna Berger-Gluck's introduction to the November issue of the Journal of Holy Land and Palestine Studies was titled "Rosemary Sayigh, A Tribute".

In January 2024, she received the 2023 Lifetime Achievement Award at the 12th annual Palestine Book Awards (PBA).

== Works ==
=== Author ===
- Palestinians: From Peasants to Revolutionaries; A People's History (Zed Books, 1979)
- Too Many Enemies: The Palestinian Experience in Lebanon (Zed Books, 1993)
- Voices: Palestinian Women Narrate Displacement (self-published, 2007)

=== Editor ===
- Yusif Sayigh: Arab Economist and Palestinian Patriot: A Fractured Life Story (The American University in Cairo Press, 2015)
- Becoming Pro-Palestinian: Testimonies from the Global Solidarity Movement (Bloomsbury Publishing, 2024)

=== Contributor ===
- "Afterword", Voices of the Nakba: A Living History of Palestine, ed. Diana Allan (Pluto Books, 2021)
