= Kharaba =

Kharaba خربا Kharraba, Kherba
- Village
- Location within Syria
- Coordinates: 32°35′14″N 36°26′34″E
- PAL: 285/222
- Country: Syria
- Governorate: Suwayda
- District: Suwayda
- Subdistrict: Suwayda

Population (2004 census)
  - Total: 581
- Time zone: UTC+2 (EET)
  - Summer (DST): UTC+3 (EEST)

Kharaba (Arabic: خربا, also spelled Kharraba or Kherba) is a village in southern Syria, administratively part of the Suwayda District of the Suwayda Governorate, located southwest of Suwayda city and northeast of Daraa. According to the 2004 census, it had a population of 581. Its inhabitants are predominantly Christians.

The residents were displaced from the village during the early years of the Syrian Civil War and were only able to return in May 2020.

== History ==
In 1596 it appeared in the Ottoman tax registers under the name of Haraba, being part of the nahiya of Butayna in the Qadaa Hauran. It had an entirely Muslim population consisting of 29 households and 15 bachelors. They paid a fixed tax-rate of 40% on agricultural products, including wheat (2100 a.), barley (900 a.), summer crops (100 a.), goats and bee-hives (50 a.), in addition to "occasional revenues" (50 a.); a total of 3,200 akçe.

== Demographics ==
According to statistics from 1927, Kharaba had a population of 715 inhabitants, all of whom were recorded as Christians.

In 2011, the Melkite Greek Catholic Church had approximately 400 believers.

== Religious buildings ==
- St. George Greek Orthodox Church
- St. Mary the Egyptian Greek Orthodox Church
- St. Lazarus Church Greek Orthodox Church
- Transfiguration of Our Lord Melkite Greek Catholic Church
- National Evangelical Presbyterian Church

== See also ==
- Christians in Syria

== Bibliography ==
- Betts, Robert Brenton (1988). The Druze. Yale University Press. p. 60.
- Butler, H.C.; Littmann, E.; Prentice, William Kelly; Stoever, Edward Royal (1930). Syria, Publications: Divisions I-IV, by Princeton University Archaeological Expeditions to Syria, 1904-5 and 1909. Vol. 6 (Seeia). Leyden: E. J.Brill.
- Hütteroth, W.-D.; Abdulfattah, K. (1977). Historical Geography of Palestine, Transjordan and Southern Syria in the Late 16th Century. Erlanger Geographische Arbeiten, Sonderband 5. Erlangen, Germany: Vorstand der Fränkischen Geographischen Gesellschaft. ISBN 3-920405-41-2.
