= Nakba denial =

Denial of the 1948 Palestinian expulsion

Nakba denial is a form of historical denialism pertaining to the 1948 Palestinian expulsion and flight and its accompanying effects, which Palestinians refer to collectively as the "Nakba" (lit. 'catastrophe'). Underlying assumptions of Nakba denial cited by scholars can include the denial of historically documented violence against Palestinians, the denial of a distinct Palestinian identity, the idea that Palestine was barren land, and the notion that Palestinian dispossession was part of mutual transfers between Arabs and Jews justified by war.

Some historians say that denial of the Nakba has become a core component of Zionist narratives, (Note: Yiftachel 2009, p. 11: "Denial of the nakba, as the Palestinians term their defeat in the 1948 war, the loss of their would-be state and the flight of refugees, has become a core Zionist value.") and was largely facilitated by early Israeli historiography. Beginning in the 1980s, the New Historians, working from declassified archives, advanced historical accounts that challenged Nakba denial, and significant volumes of Israeli Jewish literature have also emerged shedding more light on the period. In 1998, Steve Niva, editor of the Middle East Report, used the term "Nakba denial" to describe how the rise of the early Internet led to competing online narratives of the events of 1948. Zochrot, an Israeli nonprofit organization, has aimed to commemorate the Nakba through direct action.

Nakba denial has been described as still prevalent in both Israeli and US discourse and linked to various tropes associated with anti-Arab racism. In 2011, Israel enacted a law colloquially called the Nakba Law that authorizes withholding state funds from organizations that commemorate Israel's Independence Day as a day of mourning. In May 2023, following the 75th anniversary of the Nakba, Palestinian Authority president Mahmoud Abbas made denial of the Nakba or 1948 expulsion a crime punishable by two years in jail.

== Background ==
Palestinians accuse Israel of using "Nakba denial" to absolve itself of responsibility while perpetuating conflict, a characterization Israel vehemently denies. Zionist historians justify the 1948 expulsion and flight by arguing that the invading Arab armies threatened the new Jewish state with annihilation. But some of Israel's New Historians contend that Israel's founding prime minister David Ben-Gurion overstated the Arab threat with the goal of expelling Palestinian civilians and taking hold of as much of former Palestine as possible. The term "Nakba denial" was used in 1998 by Steve Niva, editor of the Middle East Report, to describe how the rise of the early Internet led to competing online narratives of the events of 1948.

Palestinian writer and historian Nur Masalha has said that Israeli teachers and educators hide the Nakba's horrors from schoolchildren, constructing and upholding a national narrative that excludes Palestinian collective memory. Masalha says that Israel's "schoolteachers, academics, educators, historians and novelists" advance "Zionist knowledge" and Zionist collective memory by using "a campaign of Nakba denial and concealment". And this exclusion, according to Ilan Pappé, "is the main constitutive element in the construction of collective Jewish identity in the state of Israel".

== Historical negationism ==
=== In Zionist and Israeli statehood narratives ===
According to scholar Nur Masalha, in Israel there is a politics of denial of the Nakba, embodied by statements by the likes of Golda Meir, such as the famous line "There was no such thing as Palestinians". Masalha has written, "denial is central to the Zionist narrative about what happened in 1948", adding that the politics of Nakba denial is itself one of the manifestations of "ongoing Nakba".

Scholar Mariko Mori's analysis of mainstream Israeli historiography of the establishment of nationhood found inadequate mentions of "the birth of the Palestinian refugee problem and the destruction of over 400 Palestinian villages in 1948, thus deliberately denying Palestinian memories of the Nakba". She finds that narratives justifying the 1948 Palestinian expulsion and flight rest on a number of assumptions, including that Palestine was an "uncultivated", "barren, uninhabited land"; that Palestinian Arabs were not a nation but part of a "greater Arab nation", disputing Palestinian Arab nationalism; that Palestinian Arabs were "rioters and pogromists"; that Jews were returning home (the negation of the Diaspora); and that population transfers were a "justifiable, universal solution to minority questions".

Historian Maha Nassar's analysis of Leon Uris's 1958 novel Exodus identifies the denial of Zionists' responsibility for the 1948 expulsion and flight of Palestinians and the claim that Arabs themselves were to blame (utilizing the anti-Arab racist tropes present in the novel) as a form of historical negationism she calls "Nakba denialism". The anti-Arab racist tropes include the notion that Palestinians lack religious attachment to Palestine, that they lack "modern feelings of national identity", and that they are easily induced to violence by their leaders. Within the paradigm of Zionism as settler colonialism, she says that such narratives blame the victims of settler colonial violence for their expulsion.

Historian Michael R. Fischbach defines Nakba denial as a "Nakba counternarrative" with particular roles in Israeli public life and state policy—especially as an instrument of resisting calls for reparations—consisting of the following themes:

- the "war is war" theme, in which the expulsion and flight was an unfortunate but inevitable side effect of Israel defending itself from the invading Arab forces and the provisional government of Israel was not culpable insofar as it did not have a "master plan" of expulsion, ignoring subsequent decisions and policies that have ever since prevented refugees' return in weighing the responsibility of the state;
- the "population exchange" theme, in which Jews and Arabs, seen as the wider Arab world, made an irrevocable mutual population and property transfer (e.g., Jews leaving Iraq also left their property behind) and resettling Jews in Israel also came at great cost;
- the claim that Israel has generally been willing to provide compensation, but that this awaits an international mechanism to apportion the funds, while not incorporating the possibility of individual redress, such as through restitution, in light of Israel passing Absentees' Property Laws and Palestinian negotiators not opposing the international fund idea during the 2000 Camp David Summit (which ended without an agreement). In such an "en masse settlement", Israel would pay out a sum and be absolved from any further obligations, constituting an "end of claims" clause, closing all legal avenues to individual Palestinians with remaining claims or who do not wish to be a part of the scheme;
- and the belief that the only thing Israel owes the refugees is property compensation, not any kind of moral reparations beyond a statement of regret.

Ilan Gur-Ze'ev and Ilan Pappé in 2003 wrote that both Israelis and Palestinians view themselves "as a sole victim while totally negating the victimization" of the other group. On the Palestinian side, the trend was moving away from "total denial" toward downplaying the Holocaust's "moral significance", while on the Israeli side, "Zionism insists on denying the Nakbah and refuses to admit Israel's role in the Palestinian suffering as victimizer" and concluding "nothing justifies ... the Israeli denial of major responsibility".

In 2017, Nadim N. Rouhana and Areej Sabbagh-Khoury wrote that the Nakba "was, until the mid-1990s, silenced in the 'official political sphere' of the Palestinians in Israel ... by the Israeli state and its institutional agents" and that it is "hard to overestimate the centrality of Nakba denial in Israel". They added, "Israel's concern about its own legitimacy was a major factor" in the emphasis of Nakba denial, leading to "the official Israeli state memory [where] Palestine was eliminated from the geography and history of the land" in favour of Jewish/Zionist terms and narratives. They cited the 2011 Nakba Law as "the most illuminating example" of the Israeli state interpreting the growing "consciousness" of Palestinians of the Nakba as a "threat" and taking steps to combat it. Bashir Bashir and Amos Goldberg agree that the 2011 Nakba Law is a form of Nakba denial.

In 2020, Marouf Hasian, Jr. wrote that one form of Nakba denial originating from the Global North is that it is "ridiculous" to consider "the birth of Israel" a catastrophe (Nakba). Hasian highlights one incident in 2009, reported by Ian Black, when Israeli minister of education Gideon Sa'ar defended the removal of the word "Nakba" from school textbooks. Sa'ar had said, "In no country in the world does an educational curriculum refer to the creation of the country as a 'catastrophe'" and the "objective of the education system is not to deny the legitimacy of our state, nor promote extremism among Arab-Israelis". Hasian says that some "Israelis worry that al-Nakba consciousness-raising threatens state legitimacy."

=== In Israeli historiography ===
According to historian Saleh Abd al-Jawad, Nakba denial has been facilitated by Israeli historiography, as it has "adopted a denial of the Nakba, a negation of the breadth of the ethnic cleansing perpetrated in Palestine".

The 1980s saw renewed interest among Israeli academics in Nakba historiography, partially resulting from the declassification of Israeli archives on the 1948 war. (Note: Al-Hardan 2016, pp. 44–46: "Concurrent with these developments, the renewed intellectual interest in the Nakba in the 1980s also resulted from the Israeli government's partial declassification of archives that pertain to the war on the Palestinians. This spurred an ideologically and methodologically varied group of so-called Israeli 'new historians' and 'sociologists' to reconsider the received Zionist narratives about what happened in Palestine during the Nakba.") In the late 1980s, Nakba denial began to be criticized and Israel's history was rewritten by the New Historians, who changed established beliefs about the 1948 Arab-Israeli War and Palestinian exodus. Since the 1980s, a considerable body of literature aimed at "demystifying the past" has emerged from within Israeli Jewish society, alongside works such as Ilan Pappé's that have been "unsettling the picture the founding fathers worked so energetically to paint and to institutionalize the hegemonic account of 1948".

Toward the end of the 20th century, the topic of Nakba denial almost went to trial in the context of the discussion of the Tantura massacre and Theodore Katz's 1998 thesis on it. Katz, a postgraduate researcher, was sued by the Alexandroni Brigade, and in the ensuing legal tussle half of his legal defense urged him to defend his work and bring forward Palestinian witnesses to speak about the massacre. This defense would have turned the trial "into a case about the denial of the Nakba", according to researcher Samera Esmeir, but the case was instead closed out of court.

Social scientist Ahmad H. Sa'di has described "three modes of denial of moral responsibility for the Nakba"; sociologist Ronit Lentin has cited his work on three strategies of Nakba denial. Per Sa'di, these are "denying or hiding the historically documented violence", trying to "remove the Palestinians from the history" of Israel before/during 1948, and perpetuating the "myth of 'a land without people for a people without land'"; Sa'di highlights Joan Peters's 1984 book From Time Immemorial and Alan Dershowitz's 2003 book The Case for Israel as examples of the latter. Peters claimed that the refugees were immigrant Arab workers and Dershowitz made similar arguments.

The second mode of Nakba denial, in Lentin's summary of Sa'di's views, is acknowledging the Nakba but "denying it carries any moral or practical implications" along with an "exaggerated connection between Palestinians and Nazis"; Sa'di cites the 2003 work of Ilan Gur-Ze'ev, who writes of "Arab involvement in the Nazi army"; Sa'di interprets this as removing the "victim-perpetrator" dynamic between Palestinians and Israelis by placing them on the same "moral ground".

The third mode of Nakba denial, per Lentin, is "addressing the moral weight of the Palestinian Nakba unapologetically". Lentin writes that this is best exemplified by historian Benny Morris's 2004 wish that the 1948 Nakba had been more complete; Morris wrote, "ethnic cleansing can be justified ... when the alternative is between [committing] ethnic cleansing and [suffering] genocide, the genocide of your own nation, I prefer ethnic cleansing". Sa'di cites another passage by Morris on this strategy: "final good justifies harsh and cruel acts that are committed in the course of history."

=== In contemporary public discourse ===
Nassar cites Nakba denial as a feature of American discourse on Palestine. Sa'di argues that it is part of the discourse of Jewish supporters of Israel.

With time, the narratives about 1948 have become harder to sustain, and "the first strategy for Zionists", according to Sa'di, was to return to the "old myth" of "a land without a people for a people without a land". Dershowitz's The Case for Israel exemplifies this, drawing on Peters's From Time Immemorial, a pseudo-historical work that suggests that most Palestinian refugees were not native to Palestine, and that with the 1948 Palestine war they returned to their countries. Through this straightforward "denial of the other's existence, this formulation did away with the colonization-uprooting dialectic", Sa'di writes.

Within Israeli civic society, there are grassroots movements against Nakba denial. The NGO Zochrot aims to raise awareness of the Nakba by directly challenging its denial through direct memorial action, such as by giving tours of depopulated Palestinian villages, sign-posting sites destroyed in the Nakba, and hosting an annual Nakba film festival. In 2007, when Israel marked its independence day, Zochrot organized a parade in Tel Aviv "to mark the recognition of the right of return", stopping off along the way at neighborhoods built on the sites of former Palestinian villages.

In 2011, Motti Golani and Adel Manna discussed the Jewish-Israeli narrative and the Palestinian-Arab narrative of the 1948 war, saying each "completely ignores" the other; the Palestinians view the Nakba "as a formative trauma" when they "to a large degree lost their country" while "the narrative espoused by most Jewish Israelis" is that the "birth of Israel ... must be pure and untainted, because if a person, a state is born in sin, its entire essence is tainted."

Ronit Lentin wrote that the "memory of the Nakba" faced "years of denial and silencing by Israel", but after archives were made available and the New Historians continued their work, by 2010 "many, though definitely not all, Israeli Jews" accepted that the Nakba occurred, though "the majority" of Israeli Jews view it as a "necessary evil", which Lentin in the same writing calls another form of Nakba denial, "addressing the moral weight of the Palestinian Nakba unapologetically". In 2019, Yehouda Shenhav wrote that despite the "partial democratization of Israeli historiography in recent decades, the majority of Israelis still deny the Nakba".

Yifat Gutman and Noam Tirosh, writing in Law and Social Inquiry, conclude that during the 2010s, supporters of Israel and right-wing journalists have popularized the term "Jewish Nakba"—which Gutman and Tirosh say presents a false equivalence between the Nakba and the Jewish exodus from the Muslim world. Academics Yasmeen Abu-Laban and Abigail B. Bakan, writing in The Political Quarterly, say that equating the Nakba with the migration of Mizrahi Jews to Israel constitutes a form of Nakba denial.

In 2018, Bashir Bashir and Amos Goldberg wrote that both "Zionist and Palestinian mainstream national narratives" have been "denying or downplaying the suffering of the other side in order to validate its own claim", resulting in the "simultaneous and forceful negation" of the Nakba and the Holocaust. Bashir and Goldberg wrote: "Many, perhaps most Jews in Israel, claim that the Nakba is not an event at all", and give the example of the 2011 publication Nakba-Nonsense by organisation Im Tirtzu, which Bashir and Goldberg describe as claiming that Palestinians do not exist as a people and that only Palestinians and Arab countries are responsible for the consequences Palestinians bore before, during, and after 1948.

== Legislation ==
=== In Israel ===
In 2009, the Israeli government banned uses of the term "Nakba" in school textbooks and required the removal of existing textbooks that mentioned it. In 2011, Israel passed a law known colloquially as the "Nakba Law" that authorized the withholding of state funds to entities that commemorated "Israel's Independence Day or the day on which the state was established as a day of mourning", or that denied the existence of Israel as a "Jewish and democratic state". While the original bill proposed to make this a crime for individuals, the proposed legislation was amended to financially penalize organizations instead. According to transitional justice researcher Yoav Kapshuk and Political scientist Lisa Strömbom, this law was an attempt to "hamper freedom of expression" surrounding the Nakba, but in doing so it inadvertently "increased public knowledge about the meaning of Nakba". In its wake, columnist Odeh Bisharat wrote that some good came out of the legislation, in that "at least, there's no denial of the Nakba. Nobody claims the whole thing is fairy-tale. The Palestinian narrative has won. The narrative that in '48 a people was exiled, by force, from its land, has seared into Israeli and global consciousness." Yehouda Shenhav wrote in 2019 that the Nakba Law had the opposite of its intended effect, because since the law was adopted, "almost every household in Israel has become acquainted with the Arabic word: al-Nakba."

=== In Palestine ===
In May 2023, Palestinian Authority President Mahmoud Abbas issued a decree defining the Nakba as a "crime against humanity", and making its denial a criminal offense punishable by up to two years in jail. The legislation echoed developments in Israel, where lawmakers in the hardline 37th government had proposed outlawing the waving of Palestinian flags.

=== In the United States ===
The 2000 Camp David Summit and subsequent US proposals encouraged Israel to "acknowledge the moral and material suffering caused to the Palestinian people as a result of the 1948 war" but did not endorse an unlimited right of return for the descendants of Palestinian refugees.

In December 2020, 22 Republican representatives led by Doug Lamborn sent President Donald Trump a letter calling for an end to "the fiction of the 'right of return'" caused by the Nakba. "We do not believe it [5.3 million] accurately reflects the number of actual Palestinian refugees", they wrote.

=== In Germany ===
The Neukölln district council in Berlin passed a motion advocating the use in high schools of brochures that dismiss the Nakba as "myth".

== See also ==
- Gaza genocide denial
- Holocaust denial

== Notes ==
=== Sources ===
==== Books and journals ====
- Abu-Laban, Yasmeen; Bakan, Abigail B. (12 July 2022). "Anti-Palestinian Racism and Racial Gaslighting". The Political Quarterly. 20 (3): 329–378. doi:10.1111/1467-923X.13166.
- Al-Hardan, Anaheed (2016). "The Nakba in Arab Thought". Palestinians in Syria: Nakba Memories of Shattered Communities. Columbia University Press. pp. 26–49. doi:10.7312/al-h17636. ISBN 978-0-231-54122-0. JSTOR 10.7312/al-h17636.6.
- Bashir, Bashir; Goldberg, Amos (2018). "Introduction: The Holocaust and the Nakba: A New Syntax of History, Memory, and Political Thought". The Holocaust and the Nakba – A New Grammar of Trauma and History. Columbia University Press. pp. 1–42. ISBN 978-0-231-18297-3.
- Ben Salem, Lobna (2021). "Humanizing the Enemy: Transcending Victimhood Narratives in Mahmoud Darwish'S and Yehuda Amichai'S Poetry". Postcolonial Text. 16 (1): 1–18 – via Docslib.org.
- Clinton, W. J. (24 December 2000). "The Clinton Parameters" – via Economic Cooperation Foundation.
- Fischbach, Michael R. (3 September 2021). "12. Nakba Denial: Israeli Resistance to Palestinian Refugee Reparations". In Bhabha, Jacqueline; Matache, Margareta; Elkins, Caroline (eds.). Time for Reparations: A Global Perspective. Pennsylvania Studies in Human Rights. University of Pennsylvania Press. pp. 183–200. doi:10.9783/9780812299915-014. ISBN 978-0-8122-9991-5.
- Golani, Motti; Manna, Adel (2011). Two Sides of the Coin: Independence and Nakba 1948. Institute for Historical Justice and Reconciliation. pp. 13–23. ISBN 978-90-8979-080-4.
- Gur-Ze'ev, Ilan; Pappé, Ilan (2003). "Beyond the Destruction of the Other's Collective Memory". Theory, Culture & Society. 20 (1): 93–108. doi:10.1177/0263276403020001922. S2CID 145563406.
- Gutman, Yifat; Tirosh, Noam (29 January 2021). "Balancing Atrocities and Forced Forgetting: Memory Laws as a Means of Social Control in Israel". Law and Social Inquiry. 46 (3): 705–730. doi:10.1017/lsi.2020.35.
- Hasian, Marouf (2020). Debates on Colonial Genocide in the 21st Century. Cham, Switzerland: Palgrave Pivot. pp. 8, 10, 78–81, 103. doi:10.1007/978-3-030-21278-0. ISBN 978-3-030-21277-3. S2CID 198739259.
- Kapshuk, Yoav; Strömbom, Lisa (2021). "Israeli Pre-Transitional Justice and the Nakba Law". Israel Law Review. 54 (3): 305–323. doi:10.1017/S0021223721000157. S2CID 239053934.
- Lentin, Ronit (2010). Co-memory and melancholia: Israelis memorialising the Palestinian Nakba. Manchester University Press. doi:10.7228/manchester/9780719081705.001.0001. ISBN 978-0-7190-8170-5. JSTOR j.ctt155jgtk.
- Masalha, Nur (2009). "60 years after the Nakba: Historical truth, collective memory and ethical obligations" (PDF). Kyoto Bulletin of Islamic Area Studies. 3 (1): 37–88.
- Masalha, Nur (2012). The Palestine Nakba: decolonising history, narrating the subaltern, reclaiming memory. London; New York: Zed Books. ISBN 978-1-84813-971-8.
- Mori, Mariko (July 2009). "Zionism and the Nakba: The Mainstream Narrative, the Oppressed Narratives, and the Israeli Collective Memory" (PDF). Kyoto Bulletin of Islamic Area Studies. 3 (1): 89–107. ISSN 1881-8323.
- Nassar, Maha (2023). "Exodus, Nakba Denialism, and the Mobilization of Anti-Arab Racism". Critical Sociology. 49 (6): 1037–1051. doi:10.1177/08969205221132878. S2CID 253134415.
- Pappé, Ilan (1998). "Fifty Years Through the Eyes of 'New Historians' in Israel". Middle East Report (207): 14–23. doi:10.2307/3013159. ISSN 0899-2851. JSTOR 3013159.
- Rouhana, Nadim; Sabbagh-Khoury, Areej (2017). Memory and the Return of History in a Settler-colonial Context: The Case of the Palestinians in Israel. Cambridge University Press. pp. 393–432. doi:10.1017/CBO9781107045316. ISBN 978-1-107-04531-6.
- Sa'di, Ahmad H.; Abu-Lughod, Lila, eds. (2007). Nakba: Palestine, 1948, and the claims of memory. Columbia University Press. ISBN 978-0-231-50970-1. JSTOR 10.7312/sadi13578.18.
  - Esmeir, S. "Memories of Conquest: Witnessing Death in Tantura". In Sa'di & Abu-Lughod (2007), pp. 229–252.
  - Sa'di, Ahmad H. "Reflections on Representations, History and Moral Accountability". In Sa'di & Abu-Lughod (2007), pp. 285–314.
  - Slyomovics, Susan. "The Rape of Qula, a Destroyed Palestinian Village". In Sa'di & Abu-Lughod (2007), pp. 27–52.
- Shalhoub-Kevorkian, Nadera (Spring 2015). "Necropolitical Debris: The Dichotomy of Life and Death". State Crime Journal. 4 (1). International State Crime Initiative: 34–51. doi:10.13169/statecrime.4.1.0034. JSTOR 10.13169/statecrime.4.1.0034.
- Shenhav, Yehouda (2019). "The Palestinian Nakba and the Arab-Jewish Melancholy". In Ginsburg, Shai; Land, Martin; Boyarin, Jonathan (eds.). Jews and the Ends of Theory. Fordham University Press. pp. 48–64. ISBN 978-0-8232-8201-2.
- Todorova, Teodora (2013). "Bearing Witness to al Nakba in a Time of Denial". In Matar, Dina; Harb, Zahera (eds.). Narrating Conflict in the Middle East: Discourse, Image and Communications Practices in Lebanon and Palestine. London: I.B. Tauris. pp. 248–270. doi:10.5040/9780755607709.ch-012. ISBN 978-1-78076-102-2.
- Yiftachel, Oren (Winter 2009). ""Creeping Apartheid" in Israel-Palestine". Middle East Report. No. 253. Middle East Research and Information Project. pp. 7–15, 37. JSTOR 27735323.

==== News media ====
- "Abbas signs decree criminalizing 'Nakba' denial". The Times of Israel. 30 May 2023.
- Asser, Martin (2 September 2010). "Obstacles to Arab-Israeli peace: Palestinian refugees". BBC News.
- Black, Ian (22 July 2009). "1948 no catastrophe says Israel, as term nakba banned from Arab children's textbooks". The Guardian. ISSN 0261-3077.
- Buxbaum, Jessica (5 June 2023). "Tantura massacre: Challenging Israel's denial of the Nakba". The New Arab.
- Ertel, Pauline (23 February 2024). "Germany: Berlin schools asked to distribute leaflet describing the 1948 Nakba as a 'myth'". Middle East Eye.
- Ruebner, Josh (22 December 2020). "In last push before Trump exits, GOP tries to erase Palestinian refugees". Mondoweiss.
- Ruebner, Josh (13 May 2022). "Five things the United States knew about the Nakba as it unfolded". Middle East Institute.
- Schleiermacher, Uta (16 May 2024). "Broschüre zur Staatsgründung Israels: Neukölln und die Nakba". Die Tageszeitung (in German).
