= Nakba =

Ethnic cleansing of Palestinians

- Part of the Israeli–Palestinian conflict
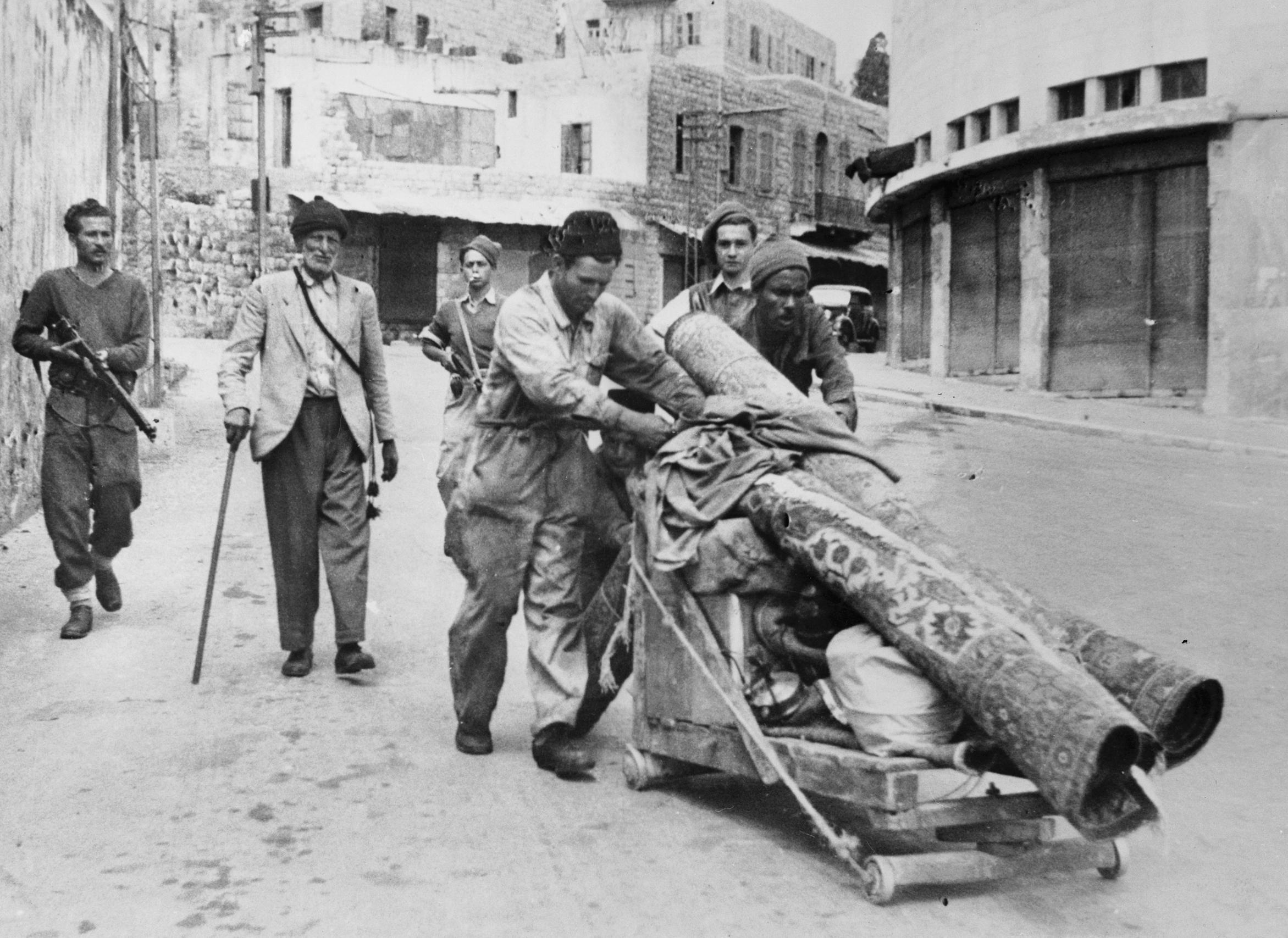
- Palestinians being displaced after the fall of Haifa, accompanied by armed Haganah paramilitaries, April 1948
- Location: Mandatory Palestine, Israeli–occupied Palestinian territories and Israel
- Date: 31 December 1947 – present
- Target: Palestinians
- Attack type: Genocide, ethnic cleansing, forced displacement, dispossession, mass killing, settler colonialism, biological warfare
- Deaths: List: 1948 Palestinian expulsion and flight: 13,000–16,000 casualties; First Intifada: 1,962 casualties; Second Intifada: Up to 3,354 casualties; 2006 Gaza–Israel conflict: 402 casualties; Gaza War (2008–2009): 1,116–1,417 casualties; 2014 Gaza War: 2,125–2,310 casualties; 2021 Israel–Palestine crisis: 285 casualties; Gaza genocide: 186,000–335,500 casualties in the Gaza Strip; at least 870 casualties in the West Bank
- Victims: List: 1948 Palestinian expulsion and flight: 750,000+ expelled or fled; Six-Day War: 413,000 displaced; Gaza genocide: 1,900,000 internally displaced
- Perpetrators: State of Israel; Before 26 May 1948: (Note: Date of the formation of the Israel Defense Forces): Haganah; Irgun; Lehi; After 26 May 1948: Israel Defense Forces
- Motive: Zionism; settler colonialism; anti-Palestinianism; anti-Arab racism

The Nakba (Arabic: النَّكْبَة, romanized: an-Nakba, lit. 'the catastrophe') is the ethnic cleansing of Palestinian Arabs by Zionists through their violent displacement and dispossession of land, property, and belongings, along with the destruction of their society and the suppression of their culture, identity, political rights, and national aspirations. The term is used to describe the events of the 1948 Palestine war, during which Zionists depopulated territories in Mandatory Palestine and declared the establishment of the State of Israel, as well as to describe Israel's ongoing persecution and displacement of Palestinians. As a whole, it covers the fracturing of Palestinian society and the longstanding rejection of the right of return for Palestinian refugees and their descendants.

During the foundational events of the Nakba in 1948, about half of Palestine's predominantly Arab population – around 750,000 people – were expelled from their homes or made to flee through various violent means, at first by Zionist paramilitaries, and after the establishment of the State of Israel, by the IDF. Dozens of massacres targeted Palestinian Arabs, and over 500 Arab-majority towns, villages, and urban neighborhoods were depopulated. Many of the settlements were either completely destroyed or repopulated by Jews and given new Hebrew names. Israel employed biological warfare against Palestinians by poisoning village wells. By the end of the war, Israel controlled 78% of the land area of the former Mandatory Palestine.

The Palestinian national narrative views the Nakba as a collective trauma that defines Palestinians' national identity and political aspirations. The Israeli national narrative views the Nakba as a component of the War of Independence that established Israel's statehood and sovereignty. Israel negates or denies the atrocities it committed, claiming that many of the expelled Palestinians left willingly or that their expulsion was necessary and unavoidable. Nakba denial has been increasingly challenged since the 1970s in Israeli society, particularly by the New Historians, but the official narrative has not changed.

Palestinians observe Nakba Day on 15 May, the day after the anniversary of the declaration of the establishment of the State of Israel, which Israel celebrates as its Independence Day. In 1967, after the Six-Day War, another series of Palestinian exodus occurred; this came to be known as the Naksa (النَّكْسَة lit. 'Setback'), and also has its own day, 5 June. The Nakba has greatly influenced Palestinian culture and is a foundational symbol of Palestinian national identity, together with the political cartoon character Handala, the Palestinian keffiyeh, and the Palestinian 1948 keys. Many books, songs, and poems have been written about the Nakba.

== Terminology ==
The word nakba (Arabic: نَكْبَة), meaning "misfortune, calamity; disaster, catastrophe", is an Arabic verbal noun (مصدر, maṣdar) of instance (اسم مرة, ism marra) of the verb nakaba (نَكَبَ), meaning "to make unhappy, miserable, afflict, distress".

The first usage of nakba after Arab armies were defeated in the 1948 Palestine War is attributed to the Syrian intellectual Constantin Zureiq, a professor of history at the American University of Beirut, in his 1948 book Ma'na an-Nakba (معنى النكبة [The Meaning of the Disaster]). Zureiq wrote, "the tragic aspect of the Nakba is related to the fact that it is not a regular misfortune or a temporal evil, but a Disaster in the very essence of the word, one of the most difficult that Arabs have ever known over their long history." Until 1948, the "Year of the Catastrophe" among Arabs referred to 1920, when European colonial powers partitioned the Ottoman Empire into a series of separate states along lines of their own choosing.

In 1949, the Palestinian poet Burhan al-Deen al-Abushi used the word again. In a six-volume encyclopedia Al-Nakba: Nakbat Bayt al-Maqdis Wal-Firdaws al-Mafqud (النكبة: نكبة بيت المقدس والفردوس المفقود [The Catastrophe: The Catastrophe of Jerusalem and the Lost Paradise]) published between 1958 and 1960, Aref al-Aref wrote: "How can I call it but Nakba? When we the Arab people generally and the Palestinians particularly, faced such a disaster (Nakba) that we never faced like it along the centuries, our homeland was sealed, we [were] expelled from our country, and we lost many of our beloved sons." Muhammad Nimr al-Hawari also used the term in the title of his book Sirr an-Nakba (سِرّ النكبة [The Secret behind the Disaster]), written in 1955.

The use of the term has evolved over time. Initially, its use among Palestinians was not universal. For example, for many years after 1948, Palestinian refugees in Lebanon avoided and even actively resisted using the term, because it lent permanence to a situation they viewed as temporary, and they often insisted on being called "returnees". In the 1950s and 1960s, terms they used to describe the events of 1948 included al-'ightiṣāb (الاغتصاب the 'forcible, illegal seizure or usurpation; violation; rape' (Note: "forcible, illegal seizure, extortion, robbery; illegal appropriation, usurpation; ravishment, violation, rape (of a women); force, compulsion, co-ercion, constraint")), or were more euphemistic, such as al-ʾaḥdāth (الأحداث 'the events'), al-hijra (الهجرة 'the exodus'), and lammā sharnā wa-tla'nā ("when we blackened our faces and left"). In the 1970s, Nakba narratives were avoided by the leadership of the Palestine Liberation Organization (PLO) in Lebanon in favor of a narrative of revolution and renewal. Interest in the Nakba by organizations representing refugees in Lebanon surged in the 1990s due to the perception that the refugees' right of return might be negotiated away in exchange for Palestinian statehood, and the desire was to send a clear message to the international community that this right was non-negotiable.

== Ottoman and British Mandate periods (prior to 1948) ==
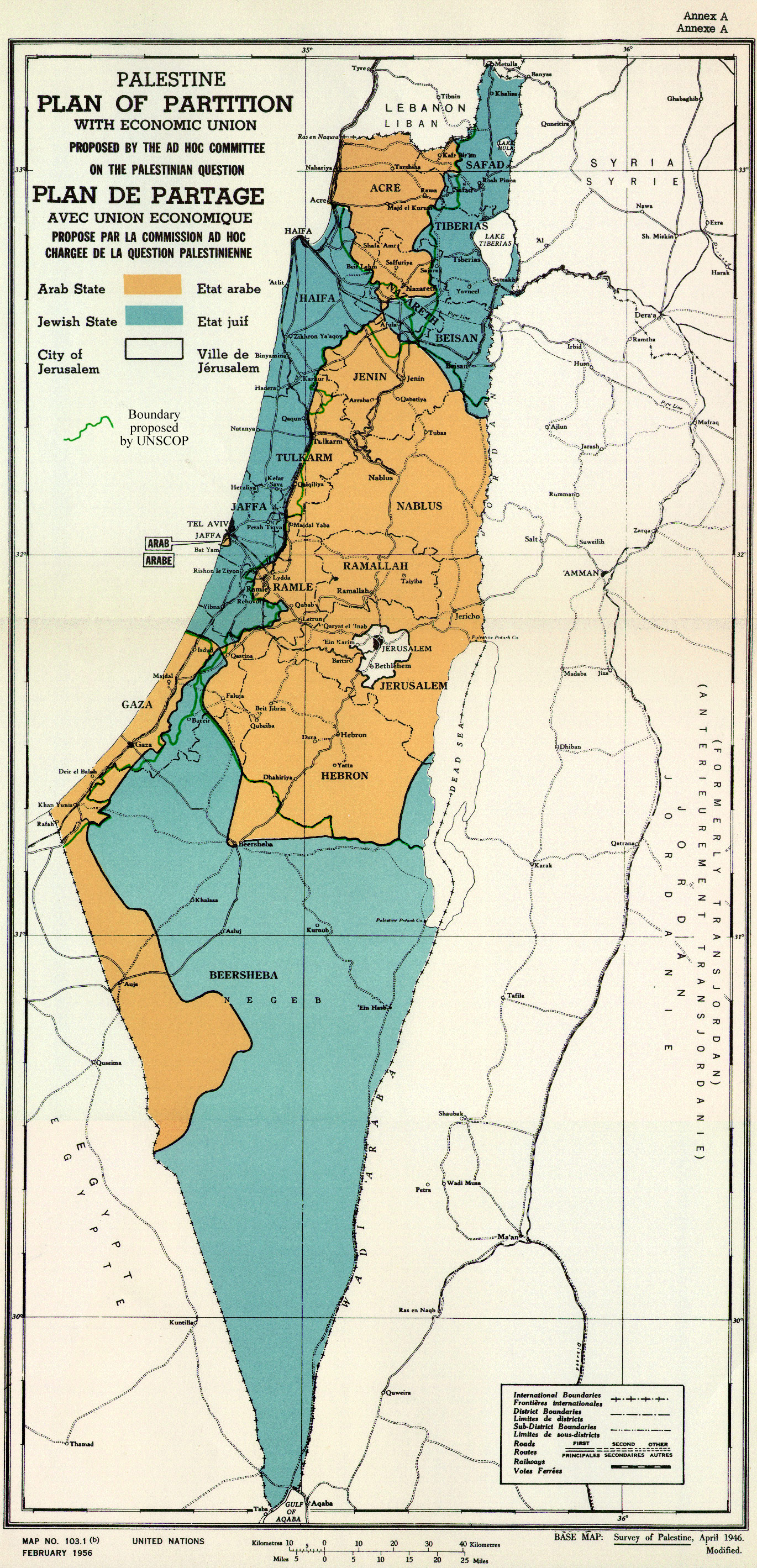
The UN Partition Plan for Palestine in 1947

The roots of the Nakba are traced to the arrival of Zionists and their purchase of land in Ottoman Palestine in the late 19th century. Potential plans to use violence to create a Jewish State began no later than 1882, when Vladimir Dubnow wrote a letter to his brother Simon, a historian, saying the goal was "taking control of Palestine over time and restore to the Jews the political independence that has been denied them this two thousand years. .... [To achieve this goal he proposed] to try to ensure that the land and all production be in Jewish hands. .... The Jews will then rise up and, with arms in hand (if need be), they will declare themselves in a loud voice the masters of their ancient homeland." Decades later, David Ben-Gurion quoted them in his memoirs. Additional plans to potentially use violence to create a State of Israel escalated in 1923 when Ze'ev Jabotinsky wrote Iron Wall; more detailed plans were made with Plan Dalet.

Zionists wanted to create a Jewish state in Palestine with as much land, as many Jews, and as few Palestinian Arabs as possible. By the time the British announced their official support for Zionism in the 1917 Balfour Declaration during World War I, Palestine's population was about 750,000, approximately 94% Arab and 6% Jewish.

After the partition of the Ottoman Empire, British-ruled Mandatory Palestine began in 1922. By then, Jews had become about 10% of the population. Both the Balfour Declaration and the Mandate for Palestine called the 90% Arab population "existing non-Jewish communities".

In February 1947, after World War II and the Holocaust, the British declared they would end the Mandate and submit Palestine's future to the newly created United Nations for resolution. The United Nations Special Committee on Palestine (UNSCOP) was created, and in September, it submitted a report to the UN General Assembly recommending partition. Palestinians and most of the Arab League opposed the partition. Zionists accepted it, but planned to expand Israel's borders beyond what the UN allocated to it. In the autumn of 1947, Israel and Jordan, with British approval, secretly agreed to divide the land allocated to Palestine between them after the end of the British Mandate.

On 29 November 1947, the General Assembly passed Resolution 181 (II), the United Nations Partition Plan for Palestine. At the time, Arabs made up about two-thirds of the population and owned about 90% of the land, while Jews made up between a quarter and a third of the population and owned about 7% of the land. The UN partition plan allocated to Israel about 55% of the land, where the population was about 500,000 Jews and 407,000–438,000 Arabs. Palestine was allocated the remaining 45% of the land, where the population was about 725,000–818,000 Arabs and 10,000 Jews. Jerusalem and Bethlehem were to be an internationally governed corpus separatum with a population of about 100,000 Arabs and 100,000 Jews.

The partition plan's detractors considered it pro-Zionist, with 56% of the land allocated to the Jewish state although the Palestinian Arab population was twice the Jewish population. The plan was celebrated by most Jews in Palestine, with Zionist leaders, in particular David Ben-Gurion, viewing it as a tactical step and a stepping stone to future territorial expansion over all of Palestine. The Arab Higher Committee, the Arab League, and other Arab leaders and governments rejected it on the basis that the Arabs not only formed a two-thirds majority but owned a majority of the land. They also indicated unwillingness to accept any form of territorial division, arguing that it violated the principles of national self-determination in the UN Charter that grant people the right to decide their own destiny. They announced their intention to take all necessary measures to prevent the resolution's implementation.

== The 1948 Nakba ==
Clickable map of Mandatory Palestine with the depopulated locations during the 1948 Palestinian expulsion and flight

The central facts of what happened in the Nakba during the 1948 Palestine war are well established, documented, and widely agreed upon by most Israeli, Palestinian, and other historians.

About 750,000 Palestinians – over 80% of the population living in the territory of what became the State of Israel – were expelled or fled from their homes and became refugees. Eleven Arab towns and cities, and over 500 villages were destroyed or depopulated. Thousands of Palestinians were killed in dozens of massacres. About a dozen rapes of Palestinians by regular and irregular Israeli military forces have been documented, and more are suspected. Israelis used psychological warfare tactics to frighten Palestinians into flight, including targeted violence, whispering campaigns, radio broadcasts, and loudspeaker vans. Looting by Israeli soldiers and civilians of Palestinian homes, business, farms, artwork, books, and archives was widespread.

=== Nov 1947 – May 1948 ===
Small-scale local skirmishes began on 30 November and gradually escalated until March 1948. When the violence started, Palestinians had already begun fleeing, expecting to return after the war. The massacre and expulsion of Palestinian Arabs and destruction of villages began in December, including massacres at Al-Khisas (18 December 1947) and Balad al-Shaykh (31 December). By March, between 70,000 and 100,000 Palestinians, mostly middle- and upper-class urban elites, were expelled or fled.

In early April 1948, the Israelis launched Plan Dalet, a large-scale offensive to capture land and empty it of Palestinian Arabs. During the offensive, Israel captured and cleared land that the UN partition resolution had allocated to the Palestinians. Over 200 villages were destroyed during this period. Massacres and expulsions continued, including at Deir Yassin (9 April 1948). Major Palestinian cities were depopulated, including Tiberias (18 April), Haifa (23 April), Acre (6–18 May), Safed (10 May), Jaffa (13 May), and West Jerusalem's Palestinian Arab neighborhood (24 April). Israel began engaging in biological warfare in April and poisoned the water supplies of certain towns and villages. In May, one such operation caused a typhoid epidemic in Acre; the Egyptians foiled another attempt in Gaza.

Under intense public anger over Palestinian losses, and seeking to take Palestinian territory for themselves to counter the Israeli-Jordanian deal, the remaining Arab League states decided in late April and early May to enter the war after the British left. But the newly independent Arab League states' armies were still weak and unprepared for war, and none of the Arab League states were interested in establishing an independent Palestinian state with Amin al-Husseini at its head. Neither the expansionist King Abdullah I of Jordan nor the British wanted the establishment of an independent Palestinian state. On 14 May, the Mandate formally ended, the last British troops left, and Israel declared independence. By that time, Palestinian society was destroyed and over 300,000 Palestinians had been expelled or fled.

=== May 1948 – Oct 1948 ===
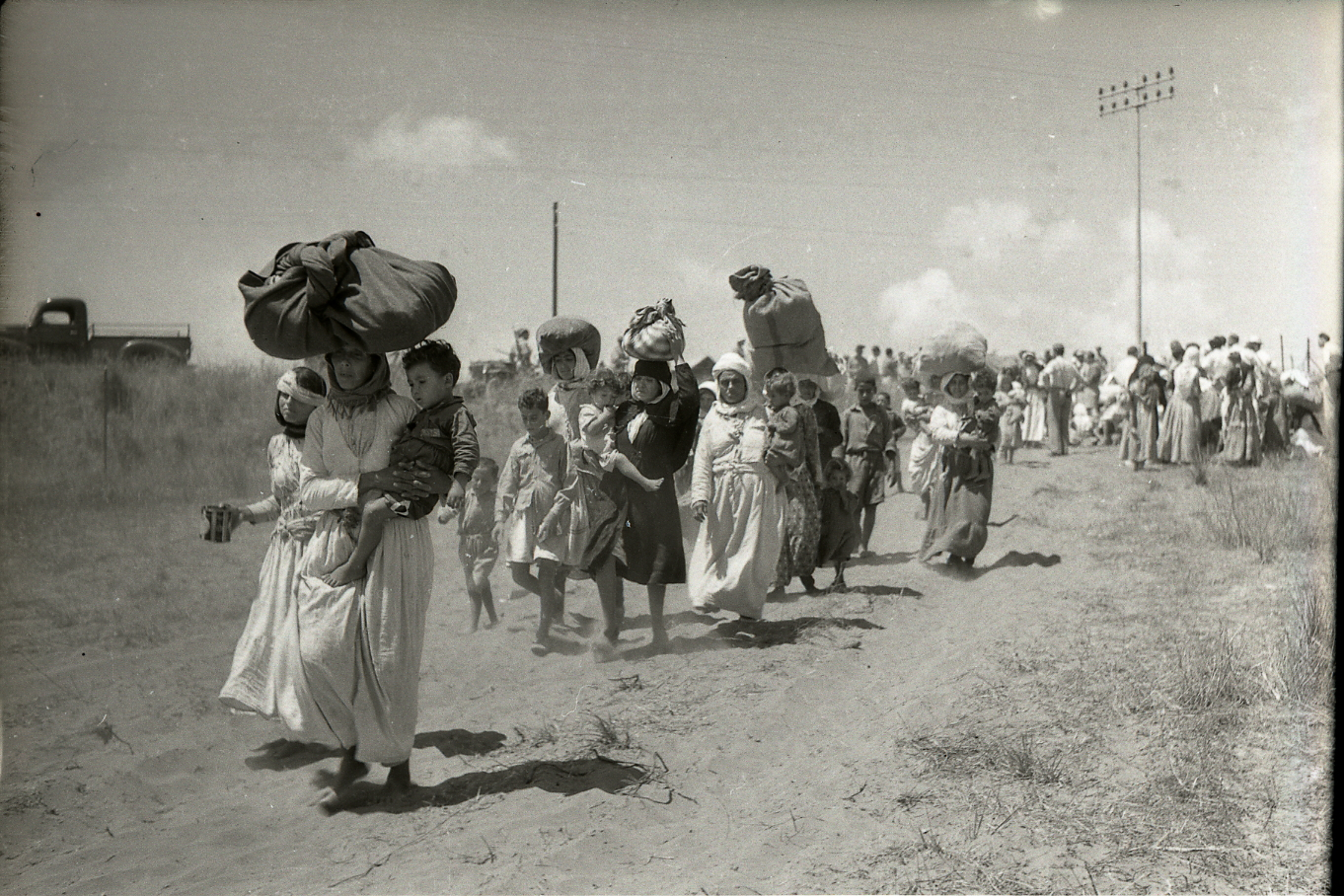
1948 expulsion of the Tantura women and children to Furaydis

On 15 May, Arab League armies entered the territory of former Mandatory Palestine, beginning the 1948 Arab–Israeli War, the second half of the 1948 Palestine war. Most of the earlier violence had occurred in and around urban centers, in the Israeli portion of the partitioned land, while British troops were still present. After the Mandate ended, Israel seized more land allocated to the Palestinians by the UN partition plan, and expulsions, massacres, and the destruction of villages in rural areas increased. The Tantura massacre was committed on 22–23 May.

The first truce between Israel and the Arab League nations was signed in early June and lasted about a month. In the summer of 1948, Israel began implementing anti-repatriation policies to prevent the return of Palestinians to their homes. A Transfer Committee coordinated and supervised efforts to prevent Palestinian return, including the destruction of villages, resettlement of Arab villages with Jewish immigrants, confiscation of land, and dissemination of propaganda discouraging return. During the ten days of renewed fighting between Israel and the Arab states after the first truce, over 50,000 Palestinians were expelled from Lydda and Ramle (9–13 July). A second truce was signed in mid-July and lasted until October. During the two truces, Palestinians who returned to their homes or crops, called "infiltrators" by the Israelis, were killed or expelled.

=== Oct 1948 – Jul 1949 ===
Expulsions, massacres, and Israeli expansion continued in the autumn of 1948. This period saw the depopulation of Beersheba (21 October), the al-Dawayima massacre (29 October), and the Safsaf massacre (also 29 October). In October, Israel converted the ad hoc military governates ruling Palestinian Arabs in Israel into a formal military government. The new system controlled nearly all aspects of their lives, including curfews, travel restrictions, employment and other economic restrictions, arbitrary detention and other punishments, and political control. Martial law assisted Israeli efforts to find and expel or kill "infiltrators" in order to prevent Palestinians from repopulating their villages.

Most of the fighting between Israel and the Arab states ended by the winter. On 11 December 1948, the UN passed Resolution 194, which declared that Palestinians should be permitted to return to their homes and be compensated for lost or damaged property. The Resolution also established the United Nations Conciliation Commission. Armistices formally ending the war were signed between February and July 1949, but massacres and expulsions of Palestinians continued in 1949 and beyond.

By the end of the war, Palestine was divided and Palestinians were scattered. Israel held about 78% of Palestine, including the 55% allocated to it by the UN partition plan and about half of the land allocated for a Palestinian state. The West Bank and Gaza Strip comprised the remaining half, and were held by Jordan and Egypt, respectively. The capital that was meant to be governed internationally (corpus separatum) was divided between an Israeli-held West Jerusalem and a Jordanian-held East Jerusalem. Israel, with its expanded borders, was admitted as a member to the United Nations in May 1949. About 156,000 Palestinians remained under military rule in Israel, including many internally displaced persons. The approximately 750,000 Palestinians who were expelled or fled from their homes were living in refugee camps in the West Bank, Gaza Strip, Jordan, Syria, and Lebanon. None were allowed to return. No Palestinian state was created.

== Post-1948 Nakba ==
=== Martial law period (1949–1966) ===
Boundaries defined in the 1947 UN Partition Plan for Palestine: Area assigned for a Jewish state Area assigned for an Arab state Planned Corpus separatum with the intention that Jerusalem would be neither Jewish nor Arab Armistice Demarcation Lines of 1949 (Green Line): Israel per 1949 armistice lines West Jerusalem and other areas under Israeli control from 1949 Gaza and the West Bank (including East Jerusalem) under Egyptian and Jordanian control till 1967

The Nakba continued after the end of the war in 1949. Israel prevented Palestinian refugees outside Israel from returning. Palestinians continued to be expelled, and more Palestinian towns and villages were destroyed, with new Israeli settlements established in their place. Palestinian place names and the name "Palestine" itself were removed from maps and books.

Massacres of Palestinians also continued after the war. Sixty-nine Palestinians were killed in the 1953 Qibya massacre. A few years later, 49 Palestinians were killed in the Kafr Qasim massacre, on the first day of the 1956 Suez Crisis.

Palestinians in Israel remained under strict martial law until 1966.

=== Naksa period (1967–1986) ===
During the 1967 Six-Day War, hundreds of thousands of Palestinian refugees were driven from the West Bank, Gaza, and East Jerusalem. Most were driven into Jordan. This has become known as al-Naksa (the "setback"). After the war, Israel occupied the West Bank and Gaza Strip.

Some 2,000 Palestinians were killed in a massacre led by the Lebanese Front at the Siege of Tel al-Zaatar in 1976, during the Lebanese Civil War. Palestinian refugees in Lebanon were killed or displaced during the 1982 Lebanon War, including between 800 and 3,500 killed in the Sabra and Shatila massacre.

=== Since the First Intifada (1987–present) ===
The First Intifada began in 1987 and lasted until the 1993 Oslo Accords. The Second Intifada began in 2000. In 2005, Israel withdrew from Gaza and blockaded it. In the West Bank and East Jerusalem, Israel built the Israeli West Bank barrier and created Palestinian enclaves.

In 2011, Israel passed the Nakba Law, which denies government funding to institutions that commemorate the Nakba.

The 2023 Gaza war has caused the highest Palestinian casualties since the 1948 war, and has raised fear among Palestinians that history will repeat itself. This fear was exacerbated when Israeli Agricultural Minister Avi Dichter said that the war would end with "Gaza Nakba 2023". Prime Minister Benjamin Netanyahu rebuked Dichter.

== Components ==
The Nakba encompasses the violent displacement and dispossession of Palestinians, along with the destruction of their society, culture, identity, political rights, and national aspirations.

=== Displacement ===
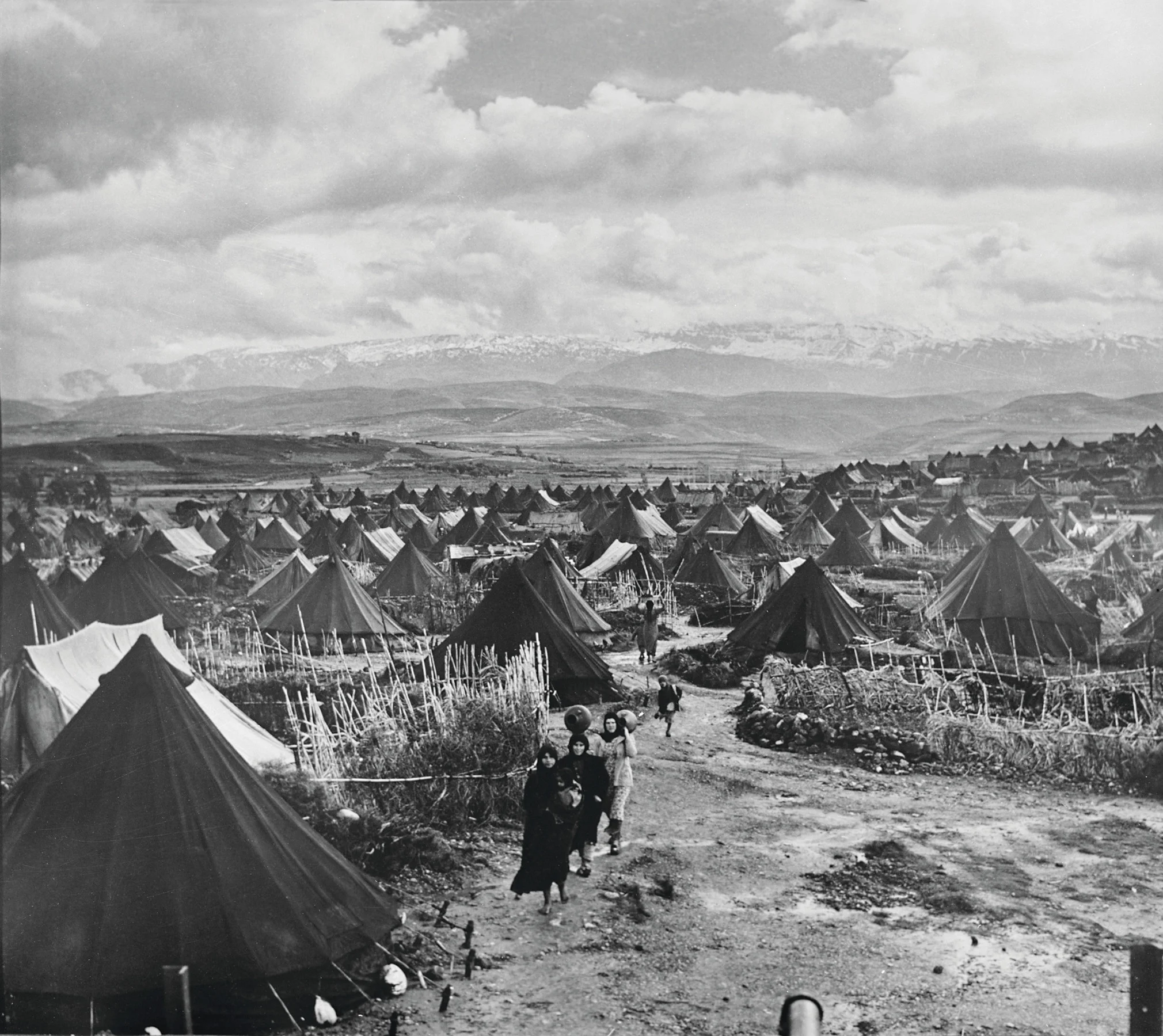
Nahr al-Bared refugee camp in Lebanon, 1952

During the 1947–49 Palestine war, an estimated 750,000 Palestinians fled or were expelled, comprising around 80% of the Palestinian Arab inhabitants of what became Israel. Almost half of this figure (over 300,000 Palestinians) had fled or had been expelled ahead of the Israeli Declaration of Independence in May 1948. This fact was named as a casus belli for the entry of the Arab League into the country, sparking the 1948 Arab–Israeli War.

Clause 10.(b) of the telegram from the Secretary-General of the League of Arab States to the UN Secretary-General of 15 May 1948 justifying the intervention by the Arab States, the Secretary-General of the League alleged that "approximately over a quarter of a million of the Arab population have been compelled to leave their homes and emigrate to neighbouring Arab countries." In the period after the war, a large number of Palestinians attempted to return to their homes. Between 2,700 and 5,000 of them were killed by Israel, the vast majority being unarmed and intending to return for economic or social reasons.

The Nakba is described as ethnic cleansing by many scholars. They include Palestinian scholars such as Saleh Abd al-Jawad, Beshara Doumani, Rashid Khalidi, Adel Manna, Nur Masalha, Nadim Rouhana, Ahmad H. Sa'di, and Areej Sabbagh-Khoury, Israeli scholars such as Alon Confino, Amos Goldberg, Baruch Kimmerling, Ronit Lentin, Ilan Pappé, and Yehouda Shenhav, and foreign scholars such as Abigail Bakan, Elias Khoury, Mark Levene, Derek Penslar, and Patrick Wolfe, among other scholars.

Other scholars, such as Yoav Gelber, Benny Morris, and Seth J. Frantzman, disagree that the Nakba constitutes an ethnic cleansing. Morris in 2016 rejected the description of "ethnic cleansing" for 1948, while also saying that the label of "partial ethnic cleansing" for 1948 was debatable. In 2004 Morris responded to the claim that ethnic cleansing occurred in 1948 by saying that, given the alternative was "genocide – the annihilation of your people", there were "circumstances in history that justify ethnic cleansing ... It was necessary to cleanse the hinterland ... ['cleanse' was] the term they used at the time ... there was no choice but to expel the Palestinian population. To uproot it in the course of war". Morris said this resulted in a "partial" expulsion of Arabs.

Still other scholars use different frameworks than "ethnic cleansing": for example, Richard Bessel and Claudia Haake use "forced removal" and Alon Confino uses "forced migration".

At the same time, many of those Palestinians who remained in Israel became internally displaced. In 1950, UNRWA estimated that 46,000 of the 156,000 Palestinians who remained inside the borders demarcated as Israel by the 1949 Armistice Agreements were internally displaced refugees. As of 2003, some 274,000 Arab citizens of Israel – or one in four in Israel – were internally displaced from the events of 1948.

=== Dispossession and erasure ===
The UN Partition Plan of 1947 assigned 56% of Palestine to the future Jewish state, while the Palestinian majority (66%) were to receive 44% of the territory. 80% of the land in the to-be Jewish state was already owned by Palestinians; 11% had a Jewish title. Before, during and after the 1947–1949 war, hundreds of Palestinian towns and villages were depopulated and destroyed. Geographic names throughout the country were erased and replaced with Hebrew names, sometimes derivatives of the historical Palestinian nomenclature, and sometimes new inventions. Numerous non-Jewish historical sites were destroyed, not just during the wars, but in a subsequent process over a number of decades. For example, over 80% of Palestinian village mosques have been destroyed, and artefacts have been removed from museums and archives.

A variety of laws were promulgated in Israel to legalize the expropriation of Palestinian land.

=== Statelessness and denationalization ===
The creation of Palestinian statelessness is a central component of the Nakba and continues to be a feature of Palestinian national life to the present day. All Arab Palestinians became immediately stateless as a result of the Nakba, although some took on other nationalities. After 1948, Palestinians ceased to be simply Palestinian, instead divided into Israeli-Palestinians, East Jerusalem Palestinians, UNRWA Palestinians, West Bank-Palestinians, and Gazan-Palestinians, each with different legal statuses and restrictions. In addition to these there was also the wider Palestinian diaspora, who were able to achieve residency outside of historic Palestine and the refugee camps.

The first Israeli Nationality Law, passed on 14 July 1952, denationalized Palestinians, rendering the former Palestinian citizenship "devoid of substance", "not satisfactory and [..] inappropriate to the situation following the establishment of Israel".

=== Fracturing of society ===
The Nakba was the primary cause of the Palestinian diaspora. At the same time as Israel was created as a Jewish homeland, the Palestinians were turned into a "refugee nation" with a "wandering identity". Today a majority of the 13.7 million Palestinians live in the diaspora, i.e. they live outside of the historical area of Mandatory Palestine, primarily in other countries of the Arab world. Of the 6.2 million people registered by the UN's dedicated Palestinian refugee agency, UNRWA, (Note: Note: The 6.2 million is composed of 5.55 million registered refugees and 0.63m other registered people; UNRWA's definition of Other Registered Persons refer to "those who, at the time of original registration did not satisfy all of UNRWA's Palestine refugee criteria, but who were determined to have suffered significant loss and/or hardship for reasons related to the 1948 conflict in Palestine; they also include persons who belong to the families of other registered persons.") about 40% live in the West Bank and Gaza, and 60% in the diaspora. A large number of these diaspora refugees are not integrated into their host countries, as illustrated by the ongoing tension of Palestinians in Lebanon or the 1990–91 Palestinian exodus from Kuwait.

These factors have resulted in a Palestinian identity of "suffering", whilst the deterritorialization of the Palestinians has created a uniting factor and focal point in the desire to return to their lost homeland.

== Long-term implications and "ongoing Nakba" ==
The most important long-term implications of the Nakba for the Palestinian people were the loss of their homeland, the fragmentation and marginalization of their national community, and their transformation into a stateless people.

Since the late 1990s, the phrase "ongoing Nakba" (Arabic: النکبة المستمرة, romanized: al-nakba al-mustamirra) has emerged to describe the "continuous experience of violence and dispossession" experienced by the Palestinian people. This term enjoins the understanding of the Nakba not as an event in 1948, but as an ongoing process that continues through to the present day.

On November 11, 2023, Israeli Agriculture Minister Avi Dichter remarked in an interview on N12 News on the nature of the Gaza war that "From an operational standpoint, you cannot wage a war like the IDF wants to in Gaza while the masses are between the tanks and the soldiers," he said. "It's the 2023 Gaza Nakba."

== Israeli legislative measures ==
Israeli officials have repeatedly described the term as embodying an "Arab lie" or as a justification for terrorism. In 2009, the Israeli Education Ministry banned using the term "nakba" in textbooks for Arab children.

In May 2009, Yisrael Beiteinu introduced a bill that would outlaw all Nakba commemorations, with a three-year prison sentence for such acts of remembrance. Following public criticism, the bill draft was changed, the prison sentence dropped and instead the Minister of Finance would have the authority to reduce state funding for Israeli institutions found to be "commemorating Independence Day or the day of the establishment of the state as a day of mourning". The new draft was approved by the Knesset in March 2011, and became known as the Nakba Law. In 2011, the Knesset passed the Nakba Law, blocking state funds from institutions that commemorated the event. The law's implementation created intimidation, but also unintentionally increased awareness of the Nakba in Israeli society, continuing a trend in which right-wing Nakba denial generates more public discourse than left-wing activism about it.

In 2023, after the United Nations instituted a commemoration day for the Nakba on 15 May, Israeli ambassador Gilad Erdan said the event was antisemitic.

== Nakba denial ==
The denial of the Nakba is central to Zionist narratives of 1948. The term "Nakba denial" was used in 1998 by Steve Niva, editor of the Middle East Report, in describing how the rise of the early Internet led to competing online narratives of the events of 1948. In the 21st century the term came to be used by activists and scholars to describe narratives that minimized elements of the expulsion and its aftermath, particularly in Israeli and Western historiography before the late 1980s, when Israel's history began to be reviewed and rewritten by the New Historians.

Nakba denial has been described as still prevalent in both Israeli and American discourse and linked to various tropes associated with anti-Arab racism. The 2011 'Nakba Law' authorized the withdrawal of state funds from organizations that commemorate the day on which the Israeli state was established as a day of mourning, or that deny the existence of Israel as a "Jewish and democratic state". Israeli grassroots movements, such as Zochrot, aim to commemorate the Nakba through public memorials and events. In May 2023, following the 75th anniversary of the Nakba, Palestinian president Mahmoud Abbas made the denial of the 1948 expulsion a crime punishable by two years in jail.

== International positions ==
On 16 May 2023, the World Council of Churches condemned the Nakba, stating that "the catastrophe Palestinian families experienced 75 years ago, continues to cause unresolved dispossession and suffering for many Palestinians". At that time, Munther Isaac, moderator of the Global Kairos for Justice Coalition, recalled that a number of Arab Christian villages were destroyed during the Nakba.

On 17 May 2024, the United Nations commemorated the Palestinian Nakba for a second year, calling on the international community to redouble its efforts to end the Israeli occupation. An event, "1948-2024: The Continuing Palestinian Nakba" was also held.

== Historiography ==
The term nakba has been used to refer to the events of 1948 since Constantin Zureiq, a professor of history at the American University of Beirut, did so in his book Ma'na an-Nakba (The Meaning of the Disaster), which was published that year.

Israeli historians Avraham Sela and Alon Kadish claim that the Palestinian national memory of the Nakba has evolved over time, reconstructing the events of 1948 to serve contemporary Palestinian national demands. They argue that the Palestinian historiography of the Nakba tends to "entirely ignore" the attacks launched by Arab irregular and volunteer forces against the Yishuv, downplaying the role of Palestinian leaders in the events leading to the 1948 war and defeat.

Elias Khoury writes that the works of Edward Said were important for taking a "radically new approach" to the Nakba than those of Zureiq and other early adopters of the term, whose usage had "the connotation of a natural catastrophe" and thus freed "Palestinian leadership and Arab governments from direct responsibility for the defeat."

During the ongoing Gaza war and genocide, Palestinian legal scholar Rabea Eghbariah argued in "Toward Nakba as a Legal Concept" (2024) that the term nakba should be adopted as a legal framework on its own terms, calling genocide, apartheid, and nakba "different, yet overlapping, modalities of crimes against humanity". The article identifies Zionism and the Nakba as mutually constitutive counterparts, analyzes the legal anatomy of the ongoing Nakba, and describes the foundational violence of the Nakba as displacement, its structure as fragmentation, and its purpose as the denial of Palestinian self-determination.

=== National narratives ===
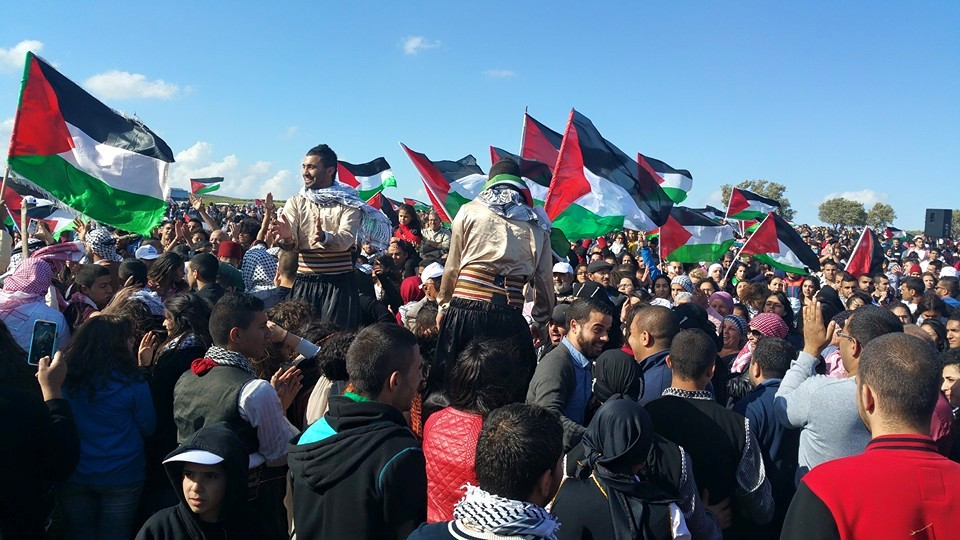
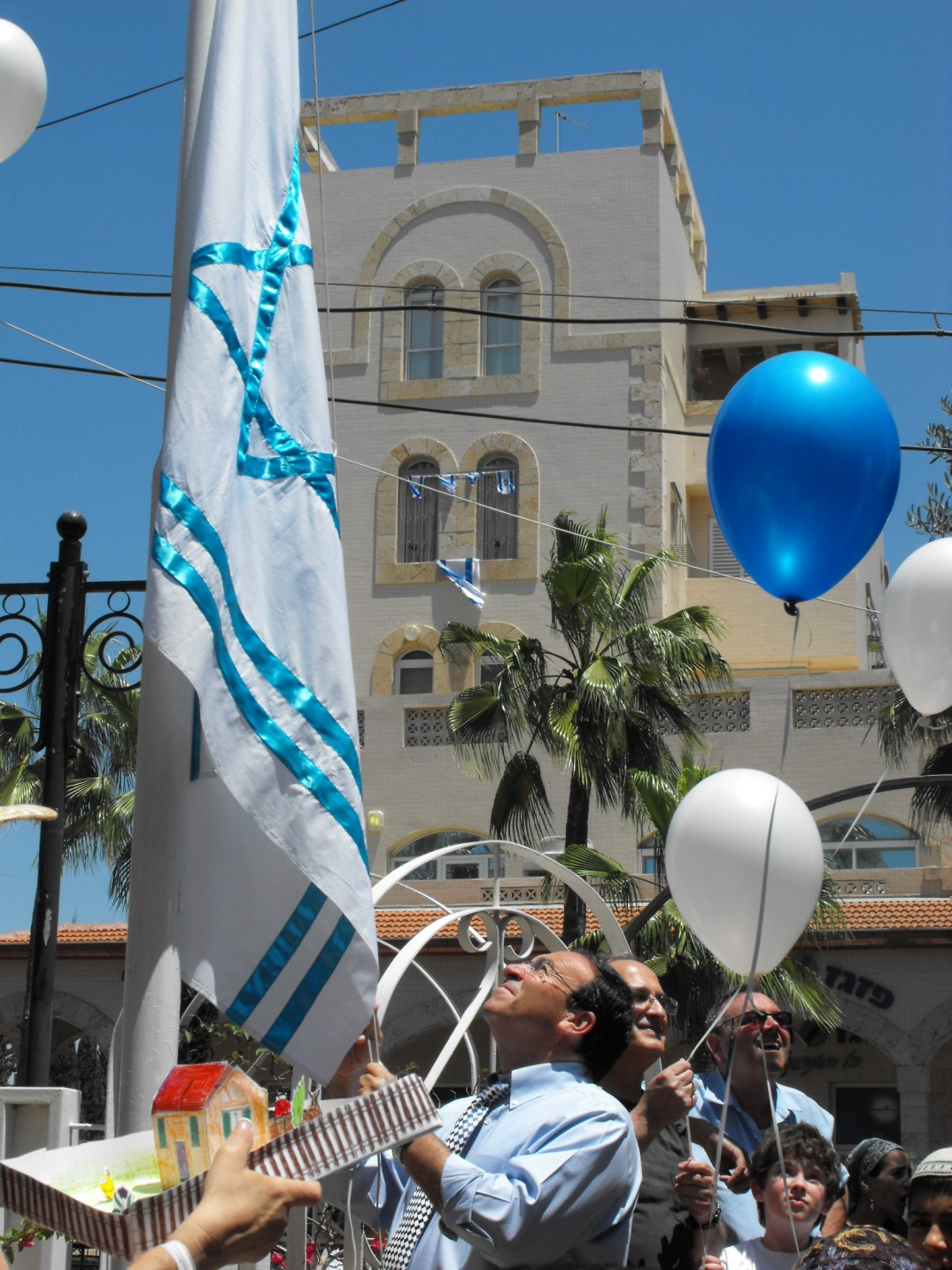
While Palestinians mourn the 1948 war as the Nakba (left, Palestinian citizens of Israel in the annual March of Return), most Israeli Jews celebrate it as their war of independence (right).

==== Palestinian national narrative ====
The Palestinian national narrative regards the Nakba's repercussions as a formative trauma defining its identity and its national, political, and moral aspirations. The Palestinian people developed a victimized national identity in which they had lost their country as a result of the 1948 war. From the Palestinian perspective, they, rather than those who were responsible, have been forced to pay for the Holocaust perpetrated in Europe with their freedom, properties, and bodies.

In the Jewish Political Studies Review, Shmuel Trigano outlined the evolution of the Nakba narrative through three stages. Initially, it depicted Palestinians as victims displaced by Israel's creation to make way for Jewish immigrants. The next phase recast the Six-Day War as Israel's colonization of Palestinian lands, aligning the Palestinian cause with anti-colonial sentiment. The final stage leverages Holocaust memories, accusing Israel of apartheid, resonating with Western guilt over the Holocaust. He argues these evolving interpretations omit complex historical factors involving failed attempts to eliminate Israel, contested territorial claims, and Jewish refugee displacement from Arab nations.

==== Israeli national narrative ====
The Israeli national narrative rejects the Palestinian characterization of 1948 as a Nakba (catastrophe), instead viewing it as a War of Independence that established Israel's statehood and sovereignty. It sees the events of 1948 as the culmination of the Zionist movement and Jewish national aspirations, resulting in military success against invading Arab armies, armistice agreements, and recognition of Israel's legitimacy by the United Nations. The narrative accommodates some Israeli responsibility for the Palestinian refugee crisis, as documented by historians like Benny Morris, within the context of Israel's emergence as a state under difficult war conditions, without negating Israel's foundational story and identity. It perceives the 1948 war and its outcome as an equally formative and fundamental event—an act of justice and redemption for the Jewish people after centuries of historical suffering, and the key step in the "negation of the Diaspora".

According to this narrative, Palestinian Arabs voluntarily fled their homes during the war, encouraged by Arab leaders who told them to temporarily evacuate so that Arab armies could destroy Israel, and then upon losing the war, refused to integrate them. Historian Walid Khalidi and his colleagues refute the narrative of a voluntary Palestinian exodus as a result of evacuation orders from Arab leaders, espoused in English most prominently by Jon Kimche and David Kimche.

The Israeli national narrative also contrasts Jewish refugees absorbed by Israel with Palestinian refugees kept stateless by Arab countries as political pawns. It claims that Arabs were not expelled from their villages, nor was their property confiscated, but that a "population exchange" took place during which property was "abandoned".

== In films and literature ==
Farha, a film about the Nakba directed by Jordanian director Darin J. Sallam, was chosen as Jordan's official submission for the 2023 Academy Awards International Feature Film category. In response, Avigdor Lieberman, the Israeli Finance Minister, ordered the treasury to withdraw government funding for Jaffa's Al Saraya Theater, where the film was scheduled for projection.

== Museums ==
The Al Qarara Cultural Museum held a collection of pre-Nakba jewellery. It was destroyed in an explosion as a result of an Israeli attack in October 2023.

== See also ==
- Al-Nakba: The Palestinian Catastrophe 1948
- Balfour Declaration
- Haifa Declaration
- Jewish exodus from the Muslim world
- Nakba Day
- Nakba Law
- The Holocaust and the Nakba

== Bibliography ==
=== Books ===
- Al-Hardan, Anaheed (5 April 2016). Palestinians in Syria: Nakba Memories of Shattered Communities. Columbia University Press. ISBN 978-0-231-54122-0.
- Auron, Yair (4 October 2017). The Holocaust, Rebirth, and the Nakba: Memory and Contemporary Israeli–Arab Relations. Lexington Books. ISBN 978-1498559492.
- Davis, Rochelle (2011). Palestinian Village Histories: Geographies of the Displaced. Stanford University Press. ISBN 978-0-8047-7313-3. Archived from the original on 27 September 2024.
- Hasian Jr., Marouf (2020). Debates on Colonial Genocide in the 21st Century. Palgrave Macmillan. ISBN 978-3-030-21278-0.
- Khalidi, Rashid (2020). The Hundred Years' War on Palestine: A History of Settler Colonialism and Resistance, 1917–2017. Metropolitan Books. ISBN 978-1-62779-854-9.
- Kimmerling, Baruch (2008). Clash of Identities: Explorations in Israeli and Palestinian Societies. Columbia University Press. ISBN 978-0-231-14329-5.
- Knopf-Newman, Marcy Jane (21 November 2011). The Politics of Teaching Palestine to Americans: Addressing Pedagogical Strategies. Springer. ISBN 978-1-137-00220-4.
- Lentin, Ronit (2010). Co-memory and melancholia: Israelis memorialising the Palestinian Nakba. Manchester University Press. ISBN 978-1-84779-768-1.
- Manna, Adel (2022). Nakba and Survival: The Story of Palestinians Who Remained in Haifa and the Galilee, 1948-1956. University of California Press. doi:10.1525/luminos.129. ISBN 978-0-520-38936-6. Archived from the original on 29 January 2024.
- Masalha, Nur (2018). Palestine: A Four Thousand Year History. Zed Books. ISBN 978-1-78699-275-8.
- Masalha, Nur (9 August 2012). The Palestine Nakba: Decolonising History, Narrating the Subaltern, Reclaiming Memory. Zed Books. ISBN 978-1-84813-973-2.
- Masalha, Nur (2003). The Politics of Denial: Israel and the Palestinian Refugee Problem. Pluto Press. doi:10.2307/j.ctt18dztmq. ISBN 978-0-7453-2120-2. JSTOR j.ctt18dztmq. Archived from the original on 19 December 2023.
- Morris, Benny (2008). 1948: A History of the First Arab-Israeli War. Yale University Press. ISBN 978-0-300-14524-3.
- Morris, Benny (2004) [1988]. The Birth of the Palestinian Refugee Problem Revisited (2nd ed.). Cambridge University Press. ISBN 978-0-521-00967-6. Archived from the original on 9 July 2025.
- Nashef, Hania A.M. (30 October 2018). Palestinian Culture and the Nakba: Bearing Witness. Taylor & Francis. ISBN 978-1-351-38749-1.
- Pappe, Ilan (2022) [2004]. A History of Modern Palestine (3rd ed.). Cambridge University Press. ISBN 978-1-108-24416-9.
- Pappe, Ilan (2017). Ten Myths About Israel. Verso Books. ISBN 978-1-78663-020-9.
- Pappe, Ilan (2006). The Ethnic Cleansing of Palestine. Oneworld Publications. ISBN 978-1-78074-056-0.
- Rogan, Eugene (2017) [2009]. The Arabs: A History (Revised and updated ed.). Basic Books. ISBN 978-0-465-03248-8.
- Sabbagh-Khoury, Areej (2023). Colonizing Palestine: The Zionist Left and the Making of the Palestinian Nakba. Stanford University Press. ISBN 978-1-5036-3629-3.
- Schulz, Helena Lindholm (2003). The Palestinian Diaspora: Formation of Identities and Politics of Homeland. Routledge. ISBN 978-0-415-26821-9.
- Segev, Tom (2019). A State at Any Cost: The Life of David Ben-Gurion. Farrar, Straus and Giroux. ISBN 978-1-4299-5184-5.
- Shlaim, Avi (2009). Israel and Palestine: Reappraisals, Revisions, Refutations. Verso Books. ISBN 978-1-78960-165-7.
- Slater, Jerome (2020). Mythologies Without End: The US, Israel, and the Arab-Israeli Conflict, 1917-2020. Oxford University Press. ISBN 978-0-19-045908-6.
- Vescovi, Thomas (15 January 2015). La mémoire de la Nakba en Israël: Le regard de la société israélienne sur la tragédie palestinienne. Editions L'Harmattan. ISBN 978-2-336-36805-4.
- Zureiq, Constantin (1956). The Meaning of the Disaster. Khayat's College Book Cooperative. (Original Arabic version: Zureiq, Constantin (1948). وصف الكتاب. دار العلم للملايين.)

=== Book chapters ===
- Abu-Lughod, Lila (2007). "Return to Half-Ruins: Memory, Postmemory, and Living History in Palestine". In Sa'di, Ahmad H.; Abu-Lughod, Lila (eds.). Nakba: Palestine, 1948, and the Claims of Memory. Columbia University Press. pp. 77–104. ISBN 978-0-231-13579-5.
- Abu-Lughod, Lila; Sa'di, Ahmad H. (2007). "Introduction: The Claims of Memory". In Sa'di, Ahmad H.; Abu-Lughod, Lila (eds.). Nakba: Palestine, 1948, and the Claims of Memory. Columbia University Press. pp. 1–24. ISBN 978-0-231-13579-5.
- Ackerman, Gary; Asal, Victor (2008). "A Quantitative Overview of Biological Weapons: Identification, Characterization, and Attribution". In Clunan, Anne; Lavoy, Peter R.; Martin, Susan B. (eds.). Terrorism, War, or Disease?: Unraveling the Use of Biological Weapons. Stanford University Press. pp. 186–213. ISBN 978-0-8047-7981-4.
- Allan, Diana K. (2007). "The Politics of Witness: Remembering and Forgetting 1948 in Shatila Camp". In Sa'di, Ahmad H.; Abu-Lughod, Lila (eds.). Nakba: Palestine, 1948, and the Claims of Memory. Columbia University Press. pp. 253–282. ISBN 978-0-231-13579-5.
- Bashir, Bashir; Goldberg, Amos (2018). "Introduction: The Holocaust and the Nakba: A New Syntax of History, Memory, and Political Thought". In Bashir, Bashir; Goldberg, Amos (eds.). The Holocaust and the Nakba: A New Grammar of Trauma and History. Columbia University Press. pp. 1–42. ISBN 978-0-231-54448-1.
- Bäuml, Yair (2017). "Israel's Military Rule over Its Palestinian Citizens (1948–1968): Shaping the Israeli Segregation System". In Rouhana, Nadim N.; Huneidi, Sahar S. (eds.). Israel and its Palestinian Citizens: Ethnic Privileges in the Jewish State. Cambridge University Press. pp. 103–136. ISBN 978-1-107-04483-8.
- Bishara, Azmi (2017). "Zionism and Equal Citizenship: Essential and Incidental Citizenship in the Jewish State". In Rouhana, Nadim N.; Huneidi, Sahar S. (eds.). Israel and its Palestinian Citizens: Ethnic Privileges in the Jewish State. Cambridge University Press. pp. 137–155. ISBN 978-1-107-04483-8.
- Cohen, Hillel (2017). "The First Israeli Government (1948–1950) and the Arab Citizens: Equality in Discourse, Exclusion in Practice". In Rouhana, Nadim N.; Huneidi, Sahar S. (eds.). Israel and its Palestinian Citizens: Ethnic Privileges in the Jewish State. Cambridge University Press. pp. 73–102. ISBN 978-1-107-04483-8.
- Confino, Alon (2018). "When Genya and Henryk Kowalski Challenged History–Jaffa, 1949: Between the Holocaust and the Nakba". In Bashir, Bashir; Goldberg, Amos (eds.). The Holocaust and the Nakba: A New Grammar of Trauma and History. Columbia University Press. pp. 135–153. ISBN 978-0-231-54448-1.
- Dajani, Omar (2005). "Surviving Opportunities". In Tamara Wittes Cofman (ed.). How Israelis and Palestinians Negotiate: A Cross-cultural Analysis of the Oslo Peace Process. US Institute of Peace Press. ISBN 978-1-929223-64-0.
- Esmeir, Samera (2007). "Memories of Conquest: Witnessing Death in Tantura". In Sa'di, Ahmad H.; Abu-Lughod, Lila (eds.). Nakba: Palestine, 1948, and the Claims of Memory. Columbia University Press. pp. 229–250. ISBN 978-0-231-13579-5.
- Ghanim, Honaida (2018). "When Yaffa Met (J)Yaffa: Intersections Between the Holocaust and the Nakba in the Shadow of Zionism". In Bashir, Bashir; Goldberg, Amos (eds.). The Holocaust and the Nakba: A New Grammar of Trauma and History. Columbia University Press. pp. 92–113. ISBN 978-0-231-54448-1.
- Hever, Hannan (2018). "From Revenge to Empathy: Abba Kovner from Jewish Destruction to Palestinian Destruction". In Bashir, Bashir; Goldberg, Amos (eds.). The Holocaust and the Nakba: A New Grammar of Trauma and History. Columbia University Press. pp. 275–292. ISBN 978-0-231-54448-1.
- Humphries, Isabelle; Khalili, Laleh (2007). "Gender of Nakba Memory". In Sa'di, Ahmad H.; Abu-Lughod, Lila (eds.). Nakba: Palestine, 1948, and the Claims of Memory. Columbia University Press. pp. 207–228. ISBN 978-0-231-13579-5.
- Jayyusi, Lena (2007). "Iterability, Cumulativity, and Presence: The Relational Figures of Palestinian Memory". In Sa'di, Ahmad H.; Abu-Lughod, Lila (eds.). Nakba: Palestine, 1948, and the Claims of Memory. Columbia University Press. pp. 107–133. ISBN 978-0-231-13579-5.
- Khoury, Elias (2018). "Foreword". In Bashir, Bashir; Goldberg, Amos (eds.). The Holocaust and the Nakba: A New Grammar of Trauma and History. Columbia University Press. pp. ix–xvi. ISBN 978-0-231-54448-1.
- Levene, Mark (2018). "Harbingers of Jewish and Palestinian Disasters: European Nation-State Building and Its Toxic Legacies, 1912-1948". In Bashir, Bashir; Goldberg, Amos (eds.). The Holocaust and the Nakba: A New Grammar of Trauma and History. Columbia University Press. pp. 45–65. ISBN 978-0-231-54448-1.
- Lustick, Ian S.; Berkman, Matthew (2017). "Zionist Theories of Peace in the Pre-state Era: Legacies of Dissimulation and Israel's Arab Minority". In Rouhana, Nadim N.; Huneidi, Sahar S. (eds.). Israel and its Palestinian Citizens: Ethnic Privileges in the Jewish State. Cambridge University Press. pp. 39–72. ISBN 978-1-107-04483-8.
- Milshtein, Michael (2009). "The Memory that Never Dies: The Nakba Memory and the Palestinian National Movement". In Litvak, Meir (ed.). Palestinian Collective Memory and National Identity. Palgrave Macmillan. ISBN 978-0-230-62163-3.
- Natour, Ghaleb (2016). "The Nakba – Flight and Expulsion of the Palestinians in 1948". In Hoppe, Andreas (ed.). Catastrophes: Views from Natural and Human Sciences. Springer Science+Business Media. ISBN 978-3-319-20846-6.
- Rouhana, Nadim (2017). "The Psychopolitical Foundations of Ethnic Privileges in the Jewish State". In Rouhana, Nadim N.; Huneidi, Sahar S. (eds.). Israel and its Palestinian Citizens: Ethnic Privileges in the Jewish State. Cambridge University Press. pp. 3–35. ISBN 978-1-107-04483-8.
- Rouhana, Nadim; Sabbagh-Khoury, Areej (2017). "Memory and the Return of History in a Settler-Colonial Context: The Case of the Palestinians in Israel". In Rouhana, Nadim N.; Huneidi, Sahar S. (eds.). Israel and its Palestinian Citizens: Ethnic Privileges in the Jewish State. Cambridge University Press. pp. 393–432. ISBN 978-1-107-04483-8.
- Sa'di, Ahmad H. (2007). "Afterword: Reflections on Representations, History and Moral Accountability". In Sa'di, Ahmad H.; Abu-Lughod, Lila (eds.). Nakba: Palestine, 1948, and the Claims of Memory. Columbia University Press. pp. 285–314. ISBN 978-0-231-13579-5.
- Sayigh, Rosemary (2023) [2015]. "On the Burial of the Palestinian Nakba". Routledge International Handbook of Ignorance Studies (2nd ed.). Routledge. pp. 279–289. ISBN 978-1-003-10060-7.
- Sayigh, Rosemary (2007). "Women's Nakba Stories: Between Being and Knowing". In Sa'di, Ahmad H.; Abu-Lughod, Lila (eds.). Nakba: Palestine, 1948, and the Claims of Memory. Columbia University Press. pp. 135–158. ISBN 978-0-231-13579-5.
- Shenhav, Yehouda (2019). "The Palestinian Nakba and the Arab-Jewish Melancholy". In Shai Ginsburg; Martin Land; Jonathan Boyarin (eds.). Jews and the Ends of Theory. Fordham University Press. pp. 48–64. ISBN 978-0-8232-8201-2.
- Slyomovics, Susan (2007). "The Rape of Qula, a Destroyed Palestinian Village". In Sa'di, Ahmad H.; Abu-Lughod, Lila (eds.). Nakba: Palestine, 1948, and the claims of memory. Columbia University Press. pp. 27–52. ISBN 9780231509701.
- Webman, Esther (2009). "The Evolution of a Founding Myth: The Nakba and Its Fluctuating Meaning". Palestinian Collective Memory and National Identity. pp. 27–45. doi:10.1057/9780230621633_2. ISBN 978-1-349-37755-8.
- Williams, Patrick (2009). "'Naturally, I reject the term "diaspora"': Said and Palestinian Dispossession". Comparing Postcolonial Diasporas. pp. 83–103. doi:10.1057/9780230232785_5. ISBN 978-1-349-36142-7.

=== Articles ===
- Abu-Laban, Yasmeen; Bakan, Abigail B. (July 2022). "Anti-Palestinian Racism and Racial Gaslighting". The Political Quarterly. 93 (3): 508–516. doi:10.1111/1467-923X.13166. S2CID 250507449.
- Abu Sitta, Salman (2003). "Traces of Poison–Israel's Dark History Revealed". Al-Ahram Weekly. Archived from the original on 29 January 2024 – via Palestine Land Society.
- Alon, Shir (2019). "No One to See Here: Genres of Neutralization and the Ongoing Nakba". The Arab Studies Journal. 27 (1): 90–117. JSTOR 26732402.
- Ben-Dror, Elad (2007). "The Arab Struggle against Partition: The International Arena of Summer 1947". Middle Eastern Studies. 43 (2). Taylor & Francis, Ltd.: 259–293. doi:10.1080/00263200601114117. ISSN 0026-3206. JSTOR 4284540. S2CID 143853008. Archived from the original on 22 December 2024.
- Carus, W. Seth (2017). "A century of biological-weapons programs (1915–2015): reviewing the evidence". The Nonproliferation Review. 24 (1–2): 129–153. doi:10.1080/10736700.2017.1385765. ISSN 1073-6700. Archived from the original on 30 January 2024.
- Cohen, Avner (2001). "Israel and chemical/biological weapons: History, deterrence, and arms control". The Nonproliferation Review. 8 (3): 27–53. doi:10.1080/10736700108436862. ISSN 1073-6700. Archived from the original on 23 January 2024.
- Docker, John (2012). "Instrumentalising the Holocaust: Israel, Settler-Colonialism, Genocide (Creating a Conversation between Raphaël Lemkin and Ilan Pappé)". Holy Land Studies. 11 (1): 1–32. doi:10.3366/hls.2012.0027. ISSN 1474-9475. Archived from the original on 10 May 2021.
- Fierke, Karin M. (2014). "Who is my neighbour? Memories of the Holocaust/ al Nakba and a global ethic of care". European Journal of International Relations. 20 (3): 787–809. doi:10.1177/1354066113497490. ISSN 1354-0661. S2CID 146188931. Archived from the original on 4 June 2023.
- Ghanim, Honaida (2009). "Poetics of Disaster: Nationalism, Gender, and Social Change Among Palestinian Poets in Israel After Nakba". International Journal of Politics, Culture, and Society. 22 (1): 23–39. doi:10.1007/s10767-009-9049-9. ISSN 0891-4486. S2CID 144148068. Archived from the original on 19 March 2024.
- Kapshuk, Yoav; Strömbom, Lisa (November 2021). "Israeli Pre-Transitional Justice and the Nakba Law". Israel Law Review. 54 (3): 305–323. doi:10.1017/S0021223721000157. S2CID 239053934.
- Khatib, R.; McKee, M.; Yusuf, S. (20 July 2024). "Counting the dead in Gaza: difficult but essential". Lancet. 404 (10, 466): 237–238. doi:10.1016/S0140-6736(24)01169-3. PMID 38976995.
- Khoury, Elias (January 2012). "Rethinking the Nakba". Critical Inquiry. 38 (2): 250–266. doi:10.1086/662741. S2CID 162316338.
- Leitenberg, Milton (2001). "Biological Weapons in the Twentieth Century: A Review and Analysis". Critical Reviews in Microbiology. 27 (4): 267–320. doi:10.1080/20014091096774. ISSN 1040-841X. PMID 11791799. Archived from the original on 19 March 2024.
- Manna, Adel (2013). "The Palestinian Nakba and Its Continuous Repercussions". Israel Studies. 18 (2): 86–99. doi:10.2979/israelstudies.18.2.86. JSTOR 10.2979/israelstudies.18.2.86. S2CID 143785830.
- Martin, Susan B. (2010), "The Battlefield Use of Chemical, Biological and Nuclear Weapons from 1945 to 2008: Structural Realist Versus Normative Explanations", American Political Science Association 2010 Annual Meeting Paper, archived from the original on 19 March 2024
- Masalha, Nur (July 2009). "60 Years after the Nakba: Historical Truth, Collective Memory and Ethical Obligations". イスラーム世界研究 [Kyoto Bulletin of Islamic Area Studies]. 3 (1): 37–88. doi:10.14989/87466. hdl:2433/87466.
- Mori, Mariko (July 2009). "Zionism and the Nakba: The Mainstream Narrative, the Oppressed Narratives, and the Israeli Collective Memory". イスラーム世界研究 [Kyoto Bulletin of Islamic Area Studies]. 3 (1): 89–107. doi:10.14989/87465. hdl:2433/87465. S2CID 211515216.
- Morris, Benny; Kedar, Benjamin Z. (3 September 2023). "'Cast thy bread': Israeli biological warfare during the 1948 War". Middle Eastern Studies. 59 (5): 752–776. doi:10.1080/00263206.2022.2122448. ISSN 0026-3206. Archived from the original on 18 January 2024.
- Nassar, Maha (September 2023). "Exodus, Nakba Denialism, and the Mobilization of Anti-Arab Racism". Critical Sociology. 49 (6): 1037–1051. doi:10.1177/08969205221132878. S2CID 253134415.
- Pappe, Ilan (12 November 2021). "Everyday Evil in Palestine: The View from Lucifer's Hill". Janus Unbound: Journal of Critical Studies. 1 (1): 70–82. doi:10.2021/ju.v1i1.2319 (inactive 1 July 2025). ISSN 2564-2154. Archived from the original on 3 February 2024.
- Pappe, Ilan (1 May 2020). "An Indicative Archive: Salvaging Nakba Documents". Journal of Palestine Studies. 49 (3): 22–40. doi:10.1525/jps.2020.49.3.22. ISSN 0377-919X. S2CID 225941252. Archived from the original on 16 December 2023.
- Ram, Uri (September 2009). "Ways of Forgetting: Israel and the Obliterated Memory of the Palestinian Nakba". Journal of Historical Sociology. 22 (3): 366–395. doi:10.1111/j.1467-6443.2009.01354.x.
- Rashed, Haifa; Short, Damien; Docker, John (May 2014). "Nakba Memoricide: Genocide Studies and the Zionist/Israeli Genocide of Palestine". Holy Land Studies. 13 (1): 1–23. doi:10.3366/hls.2014.0076.
- Rouhana, Nadim N.; Sabbagh-Khoury, Areej (2014). "Settler-colonial citizenship: conceptualizing the relationship between Israel and its Palestinian citizens". Settler Colonial Studies. 5 (3): 205–225. doi:10.1080/2201473X.2014.947671. ISSN 2201-473X. S2CID 56244739. Archived from the original on 22 October 2022.
- Sa'di, Ahmad H. (2002). "Catastrophe, Memory and Identity: Al-Nakbah as a Component of Palestinian Identity". Israel Studies. 7 (2): 175–198. doi:10.2979/ISR.2002.7.2.175. JSTOR 30245590. S2CID 144811289.
- Sayigh, Rosemary (Autumn 2013). "On the Exclusion of the Palestinian Nakba from the 'Trauma Genre'". Journal of Palestine Studies. 43 (1): 51–60. doi:10.1525/jps.2013.43.1.51. JSTOR 10.1525/jps.2013.43.1.51.
- Sayigh, Rosemary (2009). "Hiroshima, al-Nakba: Markers of New Hegemonies" (PDF). Kyoto Bulletin of Islamic Area Studies. 3 (1): 151–169. Archived (PDF) from the original on 30 January 2024.
- Wolfe, Patrick (January 2012). "Purchase by Other Means: The Palestine Nakba and Zionism's Conquest of Economics". Settler Colonial Studies. 2 (1): 133–171. doi:10.1080/2201473X.2012.10648830. hdl:1959.3/357334. S2CID 53367151.
