= Nakba Law =

2011 Israeli law

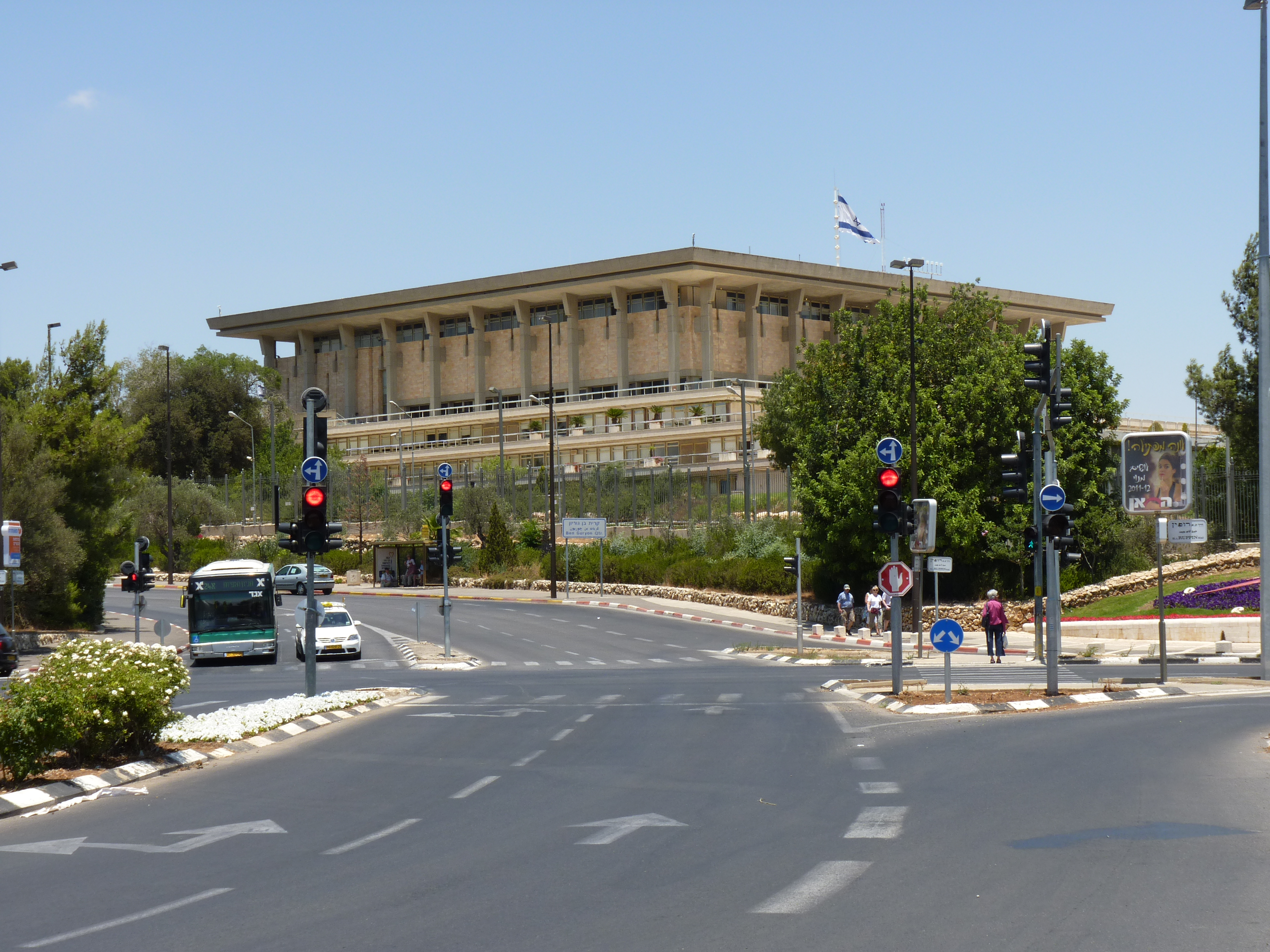

Knesset
- Enacted: 2011

"Fundamentals of Finance – Amendment No. 40", sometimes referred to as the Nakba Law, is a 2011 Israeli law that authorizes the Minister of Finance to withhold a limited amount of state funds from any government-funded institution or body that commemorates "Israel's Independence Day or the day on which the state was established as a day of mourning", or that denies the existence of Israel as a "Jewish and democratic state." The law affects organizations which are funded, in whole or in part, by the government. The amount of state funds withheld is related to the amount of money spent on the event, capped at three times the amount of money spent. The law has received criticism for limiting freedom of speech pertaining to the founding of Israel and the Nakba.

== Background ==
The law was first proposed in 2008 by Alex Miller from the nationalistic party Yisrael Beiteinu, and preliminarily approved by the Ministerial Committee for Legislation on May 24, 2009. The proposal was rejected and sent to the Committee for Constitution, Law, and Justice for revision, where the proposed fine of ten times of the cost of the event was reduced to three times of the amount at the suggestion of David Rotem (Yisrael Beiteinu).

Thirty-seven members of the Knesset voted in favor of the law, and twenty-five voted against at the third reading of the Law. 58 out of 120 MKs did not show up for the vote, including Prime Minister Benjamin Netanyahu.

== Provisions ==
The law affects organizations which are funded, in whole or in part, by the Israeli government.

It declares that the Minister of Finance is authorized to withhold transfer of state funds, if the primary goal of the funds spent was to do one of the following:

1. Denying the existence of the State of Israel as a Jewish and Democratic State
2. Incitement of racism, violence, or terrorism
3. Supporting armed conflict or acts of terror, of an enemy state or a terror organization, against the State of Israel
4. Referring to the Israeli Independence Day or the founding day of the country as a day of mourning
5. An act of vandalism or physical debasement of the flag or symbols of the state

== Effects ==
The decision of the law was criticised by the human rights organisation Human Rights Watch and the United Nations Special Rapporteur on the promotion and protection of the right to freedom of opinion and expression, Frank William La Rue also by Israeli NGOs like the Israel Democracy Institute, as an infringement of freedom of expression.

In 2019, Tel Aviv University cancelled a lecture by the politician Ofer Cassif, citing the law as the reason. This was the first instance of an academic institution heeding this law.

== See also ==
- Nakba denial
