= Areej Sabbagh-Khoury =

Palestinian sociologist and author

Areej Sabbagh-Khoury أريج صباغ-خوري
- Born: 1979 (age 46–47); Mi'ilya, Israel
- Occupations: Sociologist, academic
- Known for: Settler colonial studies, historical sociology
- Awards: Distinguished Scholars Grant, H.F. Guggenheim Foundation; Fulbright Israel

Academic background
- Education: Tel Aviv University (B.A., M.A., Ph.D.)
- Website: UC Berkeley Faculty Profile

Areej Sabbagh-Khoury (Arabic: أريج صباغ-خوري, Hebrew: אריז' סבאע'-ח'ורי; born 1979) is a Palestinian sociologist, scholar, author, and educator. She is Associate Professor in the Department of Sociology at the University of California, Berkeley and Senior Lecturer (with tenure) in the Department of Sociology and Anthropology at the Hebrew University of Jerusalem. She is most known for her scholarship on Zionist settler colonization and the Palestinian citizen population in Israel.

== Biography ==
=== Early life and education ===
Sabbagh-Khoury was born in Mi'ilya, the Galilee, Israel, to a Palestinian family.

She attended high school in Ma'alot-Tarshiha, before beginning her undergraduate studies at Tel Aviv University, from which she obtained a BA in sociology, anthropology, and political science. She obtained an MA from the Department of Sociology and Anthropology at Tel Aviv University in 2006, writing a thesis entitled, "Between the ‘Law of Return’ and the Right of Return: Reflections on Palestinian Discourse in Israel," and then a PhD from the same department in 2015. Her dissertation, advised by Yehouda Shenhav and Joel Beinin, was entitled, "Colonization Practices and Interactions at the Frontier: Ha–Shomer Ha–Tzair Kibbutzim and the Surrounding Arab Villages at the Margins of the Valley of Jezreel/Marj Ibn ‘Amer, 1936–1956."

Between 2015 and 2018, Sabbagh-Khoury held postdoctoral fellowships in the United States. She was the Ibrahim Abu–Lughod Postdoctoral Fellow at the Center for Palestine Studies at Columbia University, Meyers Postdoctoral Fellow at the Taub Center for Israel Studies at New York University, Inaugural Postdoctoral Fellow in Palestine and Palestinian Studies at the Center for Middle East Studies at Brown University, and Postdoctoral Fellow at the Center for the Humanities at Tufts University. During this time she obtained postdoctoral scholar grants from Fulbright Israel and the Israel Science Foundation.

=== Academic career ===
Sabbagh-Khoury is associate professor at the Department of Sociology at UC Berkeley. She previously served as associate professor at the Faculty of Social Sciences, Department of Sociology and Anthropology at the Hebrew University of Jerusalem. There, she has taught undergraduate and graduate-level on political and historical sociology, the Palestinians in Israel, and settler colonialism. Between 2018 and 2021 she held a Maof Scholarship for Outstanding Young Scientists, Members of Arab Society, Citizens of the State of Israel from the Israeli Council for Higher Education. In 2022 she was awarded a Distinguished Scholars Grant from the Harry Frank Guggenheim Foundation. Through ERASMUS+ Mobility Grants, she has been a visiting scholar at LMU Munich, the University of Bologna, and Wageningen University,

In addition to her teaching and publishing, Sabbagh-Khoury has served as a Research Associate, Academic Coordinator, and board member at Mada al-Carmel: The Arab Center for Applied Social Studies in Haifa. She is also a member of the scholar-activist network Academia for Equality.

== Research ==
Sabbagh-Khoury has published on settler colonialism, citizenship, indigeneity, collective memory, and political developments in Israeli and Palestinian societies. She has been recognized as an authority on the Palestinians in Israel, the Israeli-Palestinian conflict, and the sociology of settler colonialism. She has been invited to lecture in Israel, Palestine, the United States, and Europe. Her primary scholarship on the historical sociology of settler colonialism centers on interactions between self-identified socialist-leftist Zionist settlers and Palestinian Arab inhabitants in the Jezreel Valley prior to, amidst, and following the Nakba, based on fieldwork in kibbutz and state archives. She is the author of Colonizing Palestine: The Zionist Left and the Making of the Palestinian Nakba (Stanford University Press, 2023).

== Published works (selected) ==
- Sabbagh-Khoury, A. (2023). Colonizing Palestine: The Zionist Left and the Making of the Palestinian Nakba. Stanford: Stanford University Press.
- Sabbagh-Khoury, A. (2022). “Memory for Forgetfulness: Conceptualizing a Memory Practice of Settler Colonial Disavowal.” Theory and Society.
- Sabbagh-Khoury, A. (2022). "Citizenship as Accumulation by Dispossession: The Paradox of Settler Colonial Citizenship." Sociological Theory.
- Sabbagh-Khoury, A. (2021). “Tracing Settler Colonialism: A Genealogy of a Paradigm in the Sociology of Knowledge Production in Israel.” Politics and Society: 1-40.
- Rouhana, N. and A. Sabbagh-Khoury (2019). “Memory and the Return of History in a Settler-Colonial Context: The Case of the Palestinians in Israel.” Interventions: International Journal of Postcolonial Studies 21, no. 4: 527–550.
- Sabbagh-Khoury, A. and N. Rouhana (eds.) (2018). The Palestinians in Israel: Readings in History, Politics and Society, vol. 2. Haifa: Mada al-Carmel (English, also published in Arabic and Hebrew).
- Sabbagh-Khoury, A. (2018). “Settler Colonialism, the Indigenous Perspective, and Sociology of Knowledge Production in Israel.” Teoria u’Bikoret [Theory and Criticism] 50: 391- 418.
- Rouhana, N. and A. Sabbagh-Khoury (2014). “Settler-colonial Citizenship: Conceptualizing the Relationship between Israeli and its Palestinian Citizens.” Settler Colonial Studies 5, no. 3: 205–225.
- Sabbagh-Khoury, A. and N. Rouhana (eds.) (2011). The Palestinians in Israel: Readings in History, Politics and Society, vol. 1. Haifa: Mada al-Carmel.
