= Josh Ruebner =

- Education: University of Michigan
- Occupation: National advocacy director at us campaign for palestinian rights
- Website: www.joshruebner.com

Josh Ruebner is an American author, political analyst, and activist. He is the author of Shattered Hopes: Obama’s Failure to Broker Israeli-Palestinian Peace, which was published by Verso Books in August 2013.

== Career ==
Ruebner currently serves as the National Advocacy Director of US Campaign for Palestinian Rights. In this capacity Ruebner works to end United States military aid to Israel and on other policy initiatives. He co-founded Jews for Peace in Palestine and Israel in 2000, which has since merged with Jewish Voice for Peace. Ruebner is a former Analyst in Middle East Affairs at Congressional Research Service, a federal government agency providing Members of Congress with policy analysis.

== Writing ==
Ruebner's analysis and commentary appear frequently in the media. He has written for USA Today, the Los Angeles Times, The Hill, and the Huffington Post. In a September 2010 article for USA Today, Ruebner criticized continued Israeli settlement building activity during negotiations with Palestinians by stating that: “Palestinians paradoxically will still be expected to negotiate statehood with Israel while Israel — with the full support of the United States in the form of $3 billion per year in military aid — continues to gobble up the territory designated for a Palestinian state."

His book Shattered Hopes: Obama’s Failure to Broker Israeli-Palestinian Peace was published in August 2013. The book analyzed the Obama administration’s failed strategy to resolve the Israeli-Palestinian conflict and his view that they were unwilling to challenge the Israel lobby. In her review of the book, Nadia Hijab called the book an "essential contribution to the subject."

== Education ==
Ruebner received a graduate degree in International Affairs from Johns Hopkins University School of Advanced International Studies in 1999 and a bachelor's degree in Political Science and Near Eastern Studies from the University of Michigan in 1997.

== Lectures and interviews ==
The Anti-Defamation League reported, that Ruebner in a speech at Rollins College in March 2013 stated that Israel studied the Nazis' tactics in the Warsaw Ghetto Uprising to "attack and kill Palestinians in the Gaza Strip."
