= Law and Social Inquiry =

- Discipline: Law
- Language: English
- Edited by: Christopher W. Schmidt

Publication details
- Former name: American Bar Foundation Research Journal
- History: 1976-present
- Publisher: Wiley-Blackwell on behalf of the American Bar Foundation
- Frequency: Quarterly
- Impact factor: 0.861 (2015)

Standard abbreviations
- Bluebook: Law & Soc. Inquiry
- ISO 4: Law Soc. Inq.

Indexing
- ISSN: 0897-6546 (print); 1747-4469 (web)
- LCCN: 88645795
- OCLC no.: 818977153

Links
- Journal homepage; Online access; Online archive

Law and Social Inquiry is a quarterly peer-reviewed academic journal published by Wiley-Blackwell on behalf of the American Bar Foundation. It was established in 1976 as the American Bar Foundation Research Journal. The current editor-in-chief is Christopher W. Schmidt (Chicago-Kent College of Law). According to the Journal Citation Reports, the journal has a 2015 impact factor of 0.861.
