= Ahmad Sa'di =

Palestinian social scientist

Ahmad Sa'di (Arabic: احمد سعدي, Hebrew: אחמד סעדי; born 1958) is a Palestinian social scientist and a tenured professor in the Department of Politics and Government in Ben-Gurion University of the Negev, in Beer Sheva, Israel. He is the author of multiple books. Most notably he co-authored Nakba: Palestine, 1948, and the Claims of Memory (2007) with Lila Abu-Lughod.

== Books ==
- Nakba: Palestine, 1948, and the Claims of Memory with Lila Abu-Lughod, (Columbia University Press 2007) ISBN 978-0-231-13578-8
- Thorough Surveillance: The Genesis of Israeli Policies of Population Management, Surveillance & Political Control towards the Palestinians (Manchester University Press 2013) ISBN 978-0-7190-9058-5
