= Ronit Lentin =

Jewish Irish political sociologist and writer

- רונית זלצברגר
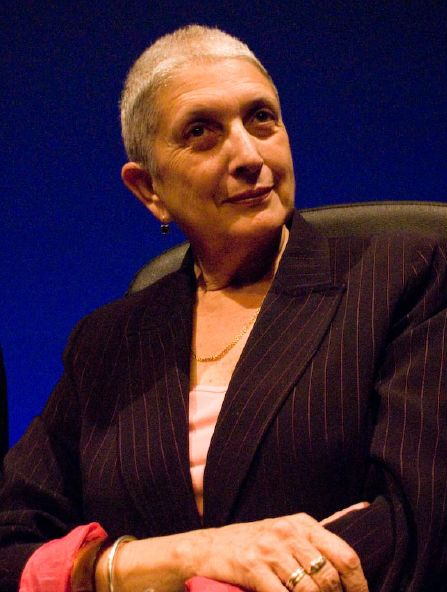
- Lentin at the Dublin Writers Festival, 2007
- Born: 25 October 1944 (age 82); Haifa, Mandatory Palestine
- Citizenship: Israeli; Irish
- Occupations: Political sociologist, writer
- Spouse: Louis Lentin
- Children: Alana Lentin, Miki Lentin
- Website: www.ronitlentin.net

Ronit Lentin (Hebrew: רונית לנטין; born 25 October 1944) is an Jewish-Irish political sociologist, and a writer of fiction and non-fiction books.

== Life ==
Lentin was born in Haifa, Mandatory Palestine, in 1944 as Ronit Salzberger and grew up in Israel. She was exempted from military service in the Israel Defense Forces for medical reasons and began studying at the Hebrew University of Jerusalem. According to Lentin, she became anti-Zionist shortly after the Six-Day War when she began following the socialist anti-Zionist group Matzpen. In 1968 she began working for Israel Television, where she met her husband Louis Lentin. She moved to Ireland in 1969 and has lived there until 2023. A political sociologist, she was an associate professor of sociology at Trinity College, Dublin until her retirement in 2014. From 1997 until 2012 Lentin was the director of the MPhil in Race, Ethnicity, Conflict, Department of Sociology. She was head of the Department of Sociology and a founder member of the Trinity Immigration Initiative, Trinity College, Dublin. Lentin has published extensively on Palestine and Israel, racism and immigration in Ireland, and on gender and genocide and the Holocaust.

Lentin has advocated an open-door immigration policy for Ireland and opposes all deportations.

Lentin is an anti-racism activist and an anti-Zionist activist for Palestinian liberation and for the Palestinians' right to resist the Zionist colonisation of Palestine.

== Research ==
Lentin has researched on racism and immigration in Ireland, on race in Israel and Palestine, and on gender violence and feminism.

== Books and publications ==
- Conversations with Palestinian Women (Hebrew, Jerusalem: Mifras 1982)
- Tea with Mrs. Klein in Triad: Modern Irish Fiction (Dublin: Wolfhound Press 1986) ISBN 0-86327-056-5
- Night Train to Mother (Dublin: Attic Press 1989) ISBN 0-946211-72-8
- Songs on the Death of Children (Dublin: Poolbeg Press 1996) ISBN 1-85371-625-1
- Israel and the Daughters of the Shoah: Reoccupying the Territories of Silence (Oxford and NY: Berghahn Books 2000) ISBN 1-57181-774-3
- Gender and Catastrophe(London: Zed Books 1997)Editor ISBN 1-85649-445-4
- (Re)searching Women: Feminist Research Methodologies in the Social Sciences in Ireland (Dublin: IPA 2000) co-editor, with Anne Byrne. ISBN 978-1-90244-845-6
- Racism and Anti-racism in Ireland (Belfast: Beyond the Pale 2002) co-editor, with Robbie McVeigh, ISBN 1-900960-16-8
- Women and the Politics of Military Confrontation: Palestinian and Israeli Gendered Narratives of Dislocation (Oxford and NY: Berghahn Books 2002) co-editor, with Nahla Abdo. ISBN 1-57181-498-1
- Women’s Movement: Migrant Women Transforming Ireland(2003) co-editor, with Eithne Luibhéid.
- Representing Migrant Women in Ireland and the EU, special issue Women's Studies International Forum, vol 27(4), October-November 2004, co editor with Eithne Luibhéid, ISSN 0277-5395
- Re-presenting the Shoah for the 21st Century(Oxford and NY: Berghahn Books. 2004), editor.ISBN 1-57181-802-2
- After Optimism? Ireland, Racism and Globalisation (Dublin: Metroeireann Publications. 2006) with Robbie McVeigh. ISBN 0-9553385-0-6
- Race and State (Newcastle: Cambridge Scholars Press. 2006) co-editor, with Alana Lentin. ISBN 1-84718-001-9
- Performing Global Networks (Newcastle: Cambridge Scholars Publishing 2007) co-editor, with Karen Fricker ISBN 1-84718-204-6
- Thinking Palestine (London: Zed Books, 2008) editor ISBN 978-1-84277-906-4
- Co-memory and Melancholia: Israelis Memorialising the Palestinian Nakba (Manchester: Manchester University Press, 2010, paperback 2014) ISBN 978-0-7190-8170-5
- Migrant Activism and Integration from Below in Ireland ( Palgrave-Macmillan, 2013) co-editor, with Elena Moreo ISBN 978-0-230-30062-0
- Traces of Racial Exception: Racializing Israeli Settler Colonialism (Bloomsbury Academic, 2018) ISBN 978-1-3500-3206-4
- 'Enforcing Silence: Academic Freedom, Palestine and the Criticism of Israel (Zed Books, 2020), co-editor with David Landy and Conor McCarthy ISBN 978-1-78699-650-3
- 'Disavowing Asylum: Documenting Ireland's Asylum Industrial Complex (Rowman and Littlefield, 2021), with Vukasin Nedljkovic ISBN 978-1-78661-252-6
- Migration and Racist State Crime, special issue State Crime Journal, vol 11(1), 2022, https://www.jstor.org/stable/e48510230
- Racial Capitalism and Palestine, special issue, co edited with Kieron Turner, Journal of Holy Land and Palestine Studies, volume 23(2), October 2024 ISSN 2054-1988
- Race and the Question of Palestine (Stanford University Press, 2025), co-editor with Lana Tatour, ISBN 978-1-5036-4297-3
