= Nadim Rouhana =

Israeli academic (born 1950)

Nadim N. Rouhana
- Born: 1950 (age 75–76); Isifiya, Israel
- Education: University of Haifa
- Scientific career
- Workplaces: The Fletcher School of Law and Diplomacy, Mada Al-Carmel
- Thesis: The Arabs in Israel: Psychological, Political and Social Dimensions of Collective Identity (1984)
- Doctoral advisor: Herbert Kelman

Nadim Rouhana is Professor of International Affairs and Conflict Studies and the Issam M. Fares Chair in Eastern Mediterranean Studies at The Fletcher School. Before joining the Fletcher School in 2008, Rouhana held teaching positions at Israeli, Palestinian, and American universities including Harvard University, Tel Aviv University and George Mason University. His research is published in Arabic, Hebrew, and English. Rouhana's research has been supported by numerous foundations, including The Ford Foundation, MacArthur Foundation, The Luce Foundation, and the United States Institute for Peace. Rouhana is also the Founding Director of Mada al-Carmel—The Arab Center for Applied Social Research in Haifa (from 2000 to 2017), which undertakes theoretical and applied social research and policy analysis to broaden knowledge and critical thinking about the Palestinians in Israel, equal citizenship, and democracy. Mada's research focuses on Israeli society, Palestinian society, dynamics of conflict, settler societies and decolonization, collective rights, and alternatives to partition. While at Mada, he led a process that brought together about fifty political, academic, and civil society leaders from the Palestinian citizens in Israel that deliberated for more than one year on a vision document to define the relationship between Israel and its Palestinian citizens. The documented, The Haifa Declaration (published in Arabic, English, and Hebrew), was endorsed by hundreds of community leaders.

== Early life and education ==
Rouhana was born in Isifiya, Mount Carmel, above Haifa to a Palestinian family who were citizens of the state of Israel. He grew up there and was educated in the Israeli school system. He is trilingual, fluent in Arabic, Hebrew, and English. He completed his BA in Psychology and Statistics at the University of Haifa, his MA in psychology at the University of Western Australia, and his Ph.D. in Social Psychology at Wayne State University. He did his postdoctoral work at Harvard University.

As part of his graduate work, he spent three years (1981–1984) at Harvard University as a student associate writing his dissertation under the supervision of Dr. Herbert Kelman, and, later, two years (1987–1989) at Harvard as a postdoctoral fellow, and ten years as Associate at the Center for International Affairs (1989 – 1999). With Kelman, he cooperated on an approach to conflict resolution called the problem-solving workshop (PSW). Rouhana and Kelman later pioneered a new approach that built on the problem-solving workshop called the continuing workshop, in which regular intensive meetings take place between high-ranking non-official individuals from parties in conflict over a long period of time in order to advance jointly formulated ideas on how to address major issues of dispute in a given conflict. Rouhana later argued that the approach has limited use when applied in settler colonial contexts, such as the Israeli-Palestinian conflict, and in cases of substantive power asymmetry.

While at the Weather Center for International Affairs at Harvard, Rouhana was a founding member of PICAR, Program on International Conflict Analysis and Resolution, and its Chair of Academic Programs. He also served as co-chair of the Seminar on International Conflict at the center.

== Career ==
Before his position at Fletcher, Rouhana was the Henry Hart Rice Professor of Conflict Analysis and Resolution at the School for Conflict Analysis and Resolution (S-CAR) at George Mason University (2004–2008) and Director of Point of View, S-CAR's international research and retreat center in Mason Neck, Virginia. Prior to that, he was an associate professor at the Department of Sociology and Anthropology at Tel-Aviv University (2000–2004). Appointments previous to this included teaching positions at Boston College, and An-Najah National University in Nablus, Palestine.

At Fletcher, Rouhana is currently Professor of International Affairs and Conflict Studies and the Issam M. Fares Chair in Eastern Mediterranean Studies. Rouhana has taught courses on Theories of Conflict and Conflict Resolution; Politics and Processes of Reconciliation; Protracted Social Conflict; Nationalism, Religion, and Conflict: A Comparative Approach; Principles of International Negotiation; and a course on History, Narratives and Current Key Issues in the Israeli-Palestinian conflict (most recently taught jointly along with Professor David Myers of UCLA in a cross-university class). This course examines the way in which the history of Israel and Palestine has been narrated; various approaches to theorize the conflict, the contested terms and concepts that are often used when discussing this conflict, particularly since October 7, 2023; and the largely unsuccessful efforts to achieve a negotiated solution to the conflict.

In 2024, at the nomination of his students, Rouhana was awarded the James L. Paddock Teaching Award in recognition of his teaching and academic contributions to the Fletcher community.

Rouhana's current research is focused on three major areas:

New paradigms of conflict analysis and resolution: Rouhana's research in this area explores power asymmetry as an overlooked dynamic within the study and implementation of conflict resolution. His analysis considers how hegemonic Western-centric conflict resolution paradigms often symmetricize conflict analysis and produce corresponding resolution frameworks that overlook inherently violent and imbalanced power dynamics that privilege the high-power party and further disempower the low-power party. He seeks to propose an alternative paradigm that challenges existing conflict analysis assumptions and incorporates questions of power asymmetry, issues of history and historical responsibility, and social justice, each of which is largely absent in standard applied conflict resolution. Rouhana's current research also specifically interrogates how the field of conflict resolution has framed the resort to violence by low-power parties in asymmetrical conflicts, and in cases of colonialism and domination in particular. By placing greater emphasis on comprehensive conflict analysis, and by giving history and justice their due place, Rouhana aims to increase the relevance of conflict resolution to parties across the Global South.

This research stream builds upon Rouhana's earlier research on power asymmetry and group identity in conflict studies, as well as on his groundbreaking work on distinguishing among conflict settlement, conflict resolution, and reconciliation. In his work he emphasizes the significance of intangible, non-negotiable human needs such as dignity, identity, and collective memory within the negotiation process. This includes his publications, Power Asymmetry and Goals of Unofficial Third Party Intervention in Protracted Intergroup Conflict (Peace and Conflict: Journal of Peace Psychology, 1997, co-authored with Susan H. Korper), Group Identity and Power Asymmetry in Reconciliation Processes: The Israeli-Palestinian Case (Peace and Conflict: Journal of Peace Psychology, 2004), and Key issues in reconciliation: Challenging traditional assumptions on conflict resolution and power dynamics (in In D. Bar-Tal (Ed.), Intergroup conflicts and their resolution: Social psychological perspective, New York: Psychology Press, 2011).

Rouhana's publications in this area include The Dynamics of Joint Thinking between Adversaries in International Conflict: Phases of the Continuing Problem-Solving Workshop (Political Psychology, 1995), Promoting Joint Thinking in International Conflicts: An Israeli-Palestinian Continuing Workshop (Journal of Social Issues, 1995), and Interactive Conflict Resolution: Issues in Theory, Methodology, and Evaluation (in International Conflict Resolution after the Cold War, National Academy Press, 2000).

The Israeli-Palestinian conflict: Rouhana has dedicated particular focus to studying the Israeli-Palestinian conflict. His research and writing have focused on the conflict dynamics in Israeli and Palestinian societies, as explored through publications such as Palestinian Citizens in an Ethnic Jewish State: Identities in Conflict (Yale University Press, 1997), the two-volume book, The Palestinians in Israel: Readings in History, Politics, and Society, of which Rouhana is co-editor and which was published in Arabic, English, and Hebrew (Mada al-Carmel, Haifa, 2018), and numerous other books, articles, and book chapters. His most recent book on this topic is the edited volume Israel and Its Palestinian Citizens: Ethnic Privileges in the Jewish State (Cambridge University Press, 2017).

His research also discusses Zionism through the lens of settler colonialism, including through recent publications in English and Arabic such as Zionism and Settler Colonialism: Palestinian Approaches (Mada al-Carmel 2023, Arabic), Decolonization as Reconciliation: Rethinking the National Conflict Paradigm in the Israeli-Palestinian Conflict (Ethnic and Racial Studies, 2017), Daring to Imagine: A future Without Zionism (State Crime Journal, 2024), and Religious Claims and Nationalism in Zionism: Obscuring Settler Colonialism (in When Politics Are Sacralized: Comparative Perspectives on Religious Claims and Nationalism, Cambridge University Press, 2021). Most recently, his research has sought to offer an analysis of how Israeli society, and conceptions of Zionism, have transformed following Israel's response to Hamas' massacre, sexual assault, and abduction of Israeli and non-Israeli citizens in October 2023.

Religion, nationalism, and violence: In 2021, Rouhana published his most recent edited volume, alongside co-editor Dr. Nadera Shalhoub-Kevorkian: When Politics Are Sacralized: Comparative Perspectives on Religious Claims and Nationalism (Cambridge University Press). The volume demonstrates how states use religious texts to sacralize and legitimize political ideologies and practices, bringing together comparative cases including Israel, India, Sri Lanka, Saudi Arabia, Serbia, and Iran.

== Books ==
- Rouhana, N. N. & Hawari, A. (2023). Zionism and settler colonialism: Palestinian approaches. Haifa: Mada al-Carmel. (Arabic).
- Rouhana, N. N. & Shalhoub-Kevorkian, N. (2021). (Eds.) When politics are sacralized: An international comparative perspective on religious claims and nationalism. Cambridge, MA: Cambridge University Press.
- Rouhana, N. N. & Sabbagh-Khoury, A. (2018). (Eds.), The Palestinians in Israel: Readings in history, politics, and society. E-publication. Haifa, Israel: Mada al-Carmel. Vols. I & II, English. (Hebrew and Arabic versions of this volume were published in 2016.)
- Rouhana, N. N. (2017). (Ed.). Israel and its Palestinian citizens: Ethnic privileges in the Jewish state. Cambridge: Cambridge University Press.
- Rouhana, N. N., Saleh, N. & Sultany, N. (2004). Voting without voice: The Palestinian Arab minority in the Israeli Knesset elections–2003. Haifa: Mada al-Carmel. (Arabic and Hebrew).
- Rouhana, N. N. (1997). Palestinian citizens in an ethnic Jewish state: Identities in conflict. New Haven, CT: Yale University Press.

== Selected articles ==
- Rouhana N. N. (2024). Daring to imagine: A future outside Zionism. State Crime Journal. Vol. 12(2):279-303. DOI: 10.13169/statecrime.12.2.0279
- Rouhana N. N. & Shalhoub-Kevorkian, N. (2022). Sacralizing state politics: Why does it matter? Contending Modernities (blog). University of Notre Dame.
- Rouhana, N. N. (2021). Zionism and the crisis of legitimacy of settler colonialism: the role of religious claims. Omran, Social Sciences Journal, 10(38), 35–80. (Arabic).
- Rouhana, N. N. (2021). Religious claims and nationalism in Zionism: Obscuring settler colonialism. In N.N. Rouhana & N. Shalhoub-Kevorkian (Eds.), When politics are sacralized: An international comparative perspective on religious claims and nationalism (pp. 54–87). Cambridge, MA: Cambridge University Press.
- Rouhana, N. N. & Sabbagh-Khoury, A. (2019). Memory and the return of history in a settler-colonial context. Interventions: International Journal of Colonial Studies, 21(4), 527–550.
- Rouhana, N. N. (2018). Decolonization as reconciliation: Rethinking the national conflict paradigm in the Israeli-Palestinian conflict. Ethnic and Racial Studies, 41(4), 643–62.
- Rouhana, N. N. (2017). The psychopolitical foundations of ethnic privileges in the Jewish state. In N. N. Rouhana (Ed.), Israel and its Palestinian citizens: Ethnic privileges in the Jewish state (pp. 3–35). Cambridge: Cambridge University Press.
- Rouhana, N. N. & Sabbagh-Khoury, A. (2016). Palestinian citizenship in Israel: A settler colonial perspective. In F. Greenspan (Ed.), Contemporary Israel: New insights and scholarship (pp. 32–62). New York: New York University Press.
- Rouhana, N. N. (2015). Homeland nationalism and guarding dignity in a settler colonial context: The Palestinian citizens of Israel reclaim their homeland. Borderlands, 14(1), 1-37.
- Rouhana, N. N. (2014). The Palestinian national project: Towards a settler colonial paradigm. Journal of Palestine Studies 97, 18–36. (Arabic).
- Rouhana, N. N. (2011). Key issues in reconciliation: Challenging traditional assumptions on conflict resolution and power dynamics. In D. Bar-Tal (Ed.), Intergroup conflicts and their resolution: Social psychological perspective (pp. 291–314). New York: Psychology Press.
- Rouhana, N. N., Shihadeh, M. & Sabbagh-Khoury, A. (2010). Turning points in Palestinian politics in Israel. Majallat al-Dirasat al-Falastiniyya, 88–113. (Arabic).
- Rouhana, N. N. (2008). Reconciling history and equal citizenship in Israel: Democracy and the politics of historical denial. In W. Kymlicka & B. Bashir (Eds.), The politics of reconciliation in multicultural societies (pp. 70–93). Oxford: Oxford University Press, 2008.
- Peled, Y. & Rouhana N. N. (2007). Transitional justice and the right of return of the Palestinian refugees. In E. Benvenisti, C. Gans, & S. Hanafi (Eds.), Israel and the Palestinian Refugees 8, 141–158.
- Rouhana, N. N. (2006). Zionism's encounter with the Palestinians: The dynamics of force, fear, and extremism. In R. I. Rotberg (Ed.), Israeli and Palestinian narratives of conflict: History's double helix (pp. 115–141). Bloomingdale, IN: Indiana University Press.
- Rouhana, N. N. & Sabbagh-Khoury, A. (2006). Force, privilege, and the range of tolerance. In K. Lahad & H. Herzog (Eds.), Knowledge and silence: On the mechanism of denial in Israeli society. Tel Aviv: The Van Leer Jerusalem Institute/Hakibbutz Hameuchad Publishing House. (Hebrew).
- Glick, P., Fiske, S. T., Abrams, D., Dardenne, B., Ferreira, M. C., Gonzalez, R., Hachfeld, C., Huang, L-L., Hutchison, P., Kim, H-J., Manganelli, A. M., Masser, B., Mucchi-Faina, A., Okiebisu, S., Rouhana, N., Saiz, J. L., Volpato, C., Yamamoto, M., & Yzerbyt, V. (2006). Anti-American sentiment and America's perceived intent to dominate: an 11-nation study. Basic and Applied Social Psychology, 28(4), 363–373.
- Rouhana, N. N. (2005). Truth and reconciliation: The right of return in the context of past injustice. In A.M. Lesch & I.S. Lustick (Eds.), Exile and return: Predicaments of Palestinians and Jews (pp. 261–278). Philadelphia, PA: University of Pennsylvania Press.
- Rouhana, N. N., Saleh, N., & Sultany, N. (2005). A vote without voice: The vote of the Palestinian minority in the sixteenth Knesset election. In A. Arian & M. Shamir (Eds.), The Elections in Israel—2003. New Brunswick and London: Transaction Books.
- Peled, Y. & Rouhana, N. N. (2004). Transitional justice and the right of return of the Palestinian refugees. Theoretical Inquiries in Law, 5(2), 317–332.
- Rouhana, N. N. (2004). Group identity and power asymmetry in reconciliation processes: The Israeli-Palestinian case. Peace and Conflict, 10(1), 33–52.
- Rouhana, N. N. & Sultany, N. (2003). Redrawing the boundaries of citizenship: Israel's new hegemony. Journal of Palestine Studies, 33(1), 5-22.
- Rouhana, N. N. (2002). On reconciliation in unrealistic times. Israeli Sociology, 4, 213–216. (Hebrew).
- Rouhana, N. N. (2001). Power and identity in reconciliation processes. Israeli Sociology, 3, 277–295. (Hebrew).
- Rouhana, N. N. (2000). Interactive conflict resolution: issues in theory, methodology, and evaluation. In P. Stern, A. George, & D. Druckman (Eds.), International Conflict Resolution after the Cold War (pp. 299–343). Washington, DC: National Academy Press.
- Yiftachel, O., Ghanem, A. & Rouhana, N. N. (2000). The debate over democracy in Israel. Jama’a, 6, 58–78. (Hebrew).
- Rouhana, N. N. (1999). Differentiation in understanding one's own and the adversary's identity in protracted intergroup conflict: Zionism and Palestinianism. Journal of Applied Social Psychology, 29(10), 1999–2023.
- Rouhana, N. N. (1999). Israel as a binational state. In S. Ozacky-Lazar, A. Ghanem, & I. Pappé (Eds.), Seven roads: Theoretical options for the status of the Arabs in Israel (pp. 243–269). Givat Haviva: The Institute for Peace Research. English translation available.
- Rouhana, N. N. (1998). Unofficial intervention: Potential contributions to resolving ethnonational conflicts. In J. Melissen (Ed.), Innovations in diplomatic practice (pp. 111–132). Basingstoke: MacMillan.
- Rouhana, N. N. (1998). Israel and its Arab citizens: Predicaments in the relationship between ethnic states and ethnonational minorities. Third World Quarterly, 19(2), 277–296.
- Rouhana, N. N. (1998). The test of equal citizenship: Israel between Jewish ethnocracy and binational democracy. Harvard International Review, 20(2), 74–78.
- Rouhana, N. N. & Ghanem, A. (1998). The crisis of minorities in ethnic states: the case of Palestinian citizens in Israel. International Journal of Middle East Studies, 30, 321–346.
- Rouhana, N.N. & Korper, S. (1996). Dealing with the dilemmas posted by power asymmetry in intergroup conflict. Negotiation Journal, 12(4), 353–366.
- Rouhana, N. N. (1995). The dynamics of joint thinking between adversaries in international conflict: phases of the continuing problem-solving workshop. Political Psychology, 16(2), 321–345.
- Rouhana, N. N. (1995). Unofficial third-party intervention in international conflict: between legitimacy and disarray. Negotiation Journal, 11(3), 255–271.
- Rouhana, N. N. & Fiske, S. (1995). Perception of power, threat, and intensity of conflict intensity in asymmetric intergroup conflict. Journal of Conflict Resolution, 39(1), 49–81.
- Rouhana, N. N. & Kelman, H. (1994). Promoting joint thinking in international conflict: an Israeli-Palestinian continuing workshop. Journal of Social Issues, 50(1), 157–178.
