= Amos Goldberg =

Israeli historian (born 1966)

- עמוס גולדברג
- Born: 1966 (age 59–60); Israel
- Education: Hebrew University of Jerusalem (BA), (MA), (PhD)

Amos Goldberg (Hebrew: עמוס גולדברג; born 1966) is a professor in the Department of Jewish History and Contemporary Jewry at the Hebrew University of Jerusalem and a fellow of the Van Leer Jerusalem Institute, also sitting on the institute's editorial board. Goldberg has published widely on the Holocaust, and was the editor of the journal Dapim: Studies on the Holocaust (2004–2014).

Since April 2024, during the Israeli invasion of the Gaza Strip, Goldberg has accused Israel of carrying out genocide in Gaza.

== Views ==
Goldberg opposes the working definition of antisemitism of the International Holocaust Remembrance Alliance, saying that "It has become a tool to silence any criticism of Israeli politics, it has become a tool to silence free speech". Instead, he supports the Jerusalem Declaration on Antisemitism.

Since April 2024, Goldberg has argued that Israel's actions in Gaza display all the characteristics of genocide, pointing to clear intent from top officials, widespread incitement, and a pervasive dehumanization of Palestinians within Israeli society. (See Gaza genocide.) He came to the view six months into the war as he noted a surge of genocidal rhetoric across media, politics, and public discourse. While he affirmed his belief in Israel’s right to self-defense following the October 7 attack, he criticized the Israeli government's response as a “criminal overreaction.” He said:

What is happening in Gaza is a genocide because Gaza does not exist anymore. It was completely destroyed. The level and pace of indiscriminate killing of a huge amount of innocent people, including in what Israel designated as a safe zone, destruction of houses, infrastructures, almost all the hospitals and universities, mass displacement, deliberate famine, the crushing of elites (including the killing of journalists, doctors, professors, civil servants...) and the sweeping dehumanization of Palestinians, create an overall picture of genocide.

== Works ==
=== Books ===
- Goldberg, Amos; Hazan, Haim (2015). Marking Evil: Holocaust Memory in the Global Age. Berghahn Books. ISBN 978-1-78238-620-9.
- Goldberg, Amos (2017). Trauma in First Person: Diary Writing During the Holocaust. Indiana University Press. ISBN 978-0-253-03021-4.
- Bashir, Bashir; Goldberg, Amos (2018). The Holocaust and the Nakba: A New Grammar of Trauma and History. Columbia University Press. ISBN 978-0-231-54448-1. LCCN 2018018867.

=== Articles ===
- Amos Goldberg; Daniel Blatman (30 January 2025). "There's No Auschwitz in Gaza. But It's Still Genocide". Haaretz.
