= Yehouda Shenhav =

Israeli sociologist

- יהודה שנהב
- Born: Yehouda Shaharabani; 26 February 1952 (age 74); Beersheba, Israel
- Education: BA in sociology and labor studies, Tel Aviv University; MA in Industrial management, Technion; MA in sociology, Stanford University; PhD in sociology, Stanford University
- Occupations: Sociologist, academic, critical theorist
- Employer: Tel Aviv University
- Known for: Research in bureaucracy, management, capitalism, ethnicity in Israeli society, and the Israeli-Palestinian conflict
- Awards: Dorothy Harlow Award; Association for Israeli Studies award

Yehouda Shenhav (Hebrew: יהודה שנהב; born 26 February 1952) is an Israeli sociologist and critical theorist. He is known for his contributions in the fields of bureaucracy, management and capitalism, as well as for his research on ethnicity in Israeli society and its relationship with the Israeli-Palestinian conflict.

== Biography ==
Yehouda Shaharabani (later Shenhav) was born in Beersheba in 1952 to a family of Iraqi Jews. At the age of three he moved with his family to Tel Aviv and again, at the age of ten, to Petah Tikva.

In 1977 he received his BA in sociology and labor studies from the Tel Aviv University and four years later he received his Master's degree in Industrial management from the Technion. He then traveled to Stanford University, where he received another MA in 1983 and a PhD in 1985, both in sociology.

Most of his academic work is done in the Sociology and Anthropology School in the Tel Aviv University, where he is a full professor. He has also taught in several universities in the United States, such as the University of Wisconsin–Madison, Stanford University, Princeton University and Columbia University.

He is head of advanced studies in the Van Leer Jerusalem Institute, and as the editor of Theory & Criticism and Theory and Criticism in Context, and as Senior Editor for the European journal Organization Studies.

He has won several awards, including the Dorothy Harlow Award of the American Academy of Management; and the Association for Israeli Studies award for The Arab Jews: A Postcolonial Reading of Nationalism, Religion, and Ethnicity.

== Social activism ==
Shenhav is a well-known figure in Israel as a public intellectual and as one of the founders of the Mizrahi Democratic Rainbow Coalition, a social movement founded in 1996 by descendants of Jewish refugees, Olim, from Arab countries, which defines itself as an extra-parliamentary movement seeking to challenge the ethnic structure in the Israeli society.

One of the Rainbow Coalition's chief struggles was for lands, in which Shenhav and others petitioned to the Supreme Court of Israel against what he described as an unjust distribution of state owned lands, made worse by decisions of the Israel Land Administration, and won.

In late 1996 Shenhav published in Haaretz an article titled "The Bond of Silence", which generated a great deal of reaction. He pointed to an "inter-generational bond of silence between the ideological commissars of the formative years of Zionism ("the salt of the earth") and the contemporary intellectuals of the Israeli Left (also "salt of the earth"). These two generations of Ashkenazi hegemony concur in their silence toward the "Mizrahi problem". He also argued that "denouncing the injustice done to the Palestinians does not endanger the status of our contemporary Ashkenazi intellectuals. It does not endanger their position as a hegemonic cultural group in Israeli society or as an economic class" and that "Dealing with the injustices inflicted on the Palestinians earns them laurels of humanism, the esteemed roles of slaughterers of sacred cows and seekers of peace, the badge of the rebel, and a catharsis in light of the crime of their parents' generation" yet the Palestinian is marked as the "Other", which can be kept on the other side of the fence. The Mizrahi Jews, on the other hand, "cannot be turned into an "other," nor can they be cast beyond the fence; at most, one can construct detours to bypass development towns and poverty neighborhoods". Recognition of the injustices done to the Mizrahim will force the Israeli left to reform itself as well and to relinquish its hegemonic position. To avoid that, they created a taboo.

The article had great resonance in and outside of Israel. It was followed by 25 response article in Haaretz and the multiplicity of references in the media was considered to have marked the beginning of a new public discussion.

Linking the political and intercommunal schism in Identity politics was criticized by conservative intellectuals. It was argued that Mizrahi identity is an anachronism which endangers the Israeli melting pot.

That argument has also been associated with his activities against the Israeli occupation and for a democratic Israel and Palestine. Shenhav said that while the Jews certainly had the right for a collective self-determination in Israel, the state must also reach an agreement with its Palestinian citizens regarding their collective representation as a national minority within it.

== Ideas ==
=== Bureaucracy and rationality ===
Shenhav attempted to broaden the concept of rationality by referring to it as an ideology within a cultural discourse.

In his monograph Managerial Ideologies in the Age of Rationality, Shenhav argued that Max Weber's concept of bureaucracy which gathered momentum in the 19th century and was elaborated in the 20th century, is not rational in the ontological sense, but in fact the opposite. Shenhav argued that despite its claim for precision, non-arbitrary and universal, that system's foundations are not necessarily more efficient than others and are certainly not universal, but rather of a particular social, economic and historic context.

In his book The Organization Machine: A Critical Inquiry into the Foundations of Management Theory, Shenhav sought to show how rationality was turned into an ideology by management experts (such as Alexander Hamilton Church and Frederick Winslow Taylor) in the 19th century, following the Industrial Revolution. During that time, large factories were incorporated, and were hard for capitalists to control. Managers assumed a more prominent role in the organized environment, and since the profession was not yet sufficiently institutionalized, managers used an ideology of rationality and efficiency to establish their power, control and capital.

Shenhav's basic argument is that the economic crisis at the time actually helped managers become part of the organizational landscape, since it helped justify their function. Managers adopted a rhetoric which associated management with the resolution of an economic crisis. As the crisis became widespread, statistics showed a growth in the number of managers in the West, especially the United States.

In 1999's Manufacturing Rationality: The Engineering Foundations of the Managerial Revolution, Shenhav set the concept of "Managerial Revolution" up to a critical analysis. He aimed to show how managerial language and activism developed through the creation of a language and practice that hid the aggressive and violent context of their growth. In addition to his previous studies, which described ways in which the managerial profession fought the workers and exercised symbolic and practical violence against them, he also displayed the growth of management as bound in a struggle against Capitalism, which forced it to invent itself and its language out of nothing, fighting both workers and capitalists.

=== Stratification and ethnicity ===
Throughout his career, Shenhav published several articles on the subject of the ethnicity, race and on postcolonial regimes. In 2003 he published (in Hebrew) The Arab Jews, in which he attempted to place the discussion of the Arab Jews within the context of the discussion of the Palestinian refugees and the Palestinian narrative. He challenges the Israeli structural knowledge which separates, factitiously in his eyes, between them. The book was also published in English in 2006 (Stanford University Press).

Shenhav traced the origins of the conceptualization of the Mizrahi Jews as Arab Jews by challenging the hegemonic discourse, which uses the category of the "Oriental Jews" and later "Mizrahi". Both of those options, according to Shenhav, conceals the Arab identities and culture and provides new cultural cultures from the Mediterranean. The book discussed the way in which two categories where juxtaposed in the Israeli discourse - one which distinguishes Jews from non-Jews, and another, which is perceived as an exclusively Jewish discourse, between Ashkenazi and Mizrahi. Shenhav seeks to undermine those categories, which he believes to be fixated and do not allow a description of Mizrahi history from a comparative perspective.

Shenhav described the operation of a cultural machine which fixated the Jews from Arab countries as Arab Jews, but did so without "purifying" them from their Arabism, and portrayed the wide border zone along which that conversion took place. He presented a critical inquiry of the relations between Zionism and the Arab Jews by displaying Zionism as an ideological practice with three simultaneous and symbiotic categories: "Nationality", "Religion" and "Ethnicity". In order to be included in the national collective, they had to be "de-Arabized". Religion distinguished between Arabs and Arab Jews, thus marking nationality among the Arab Jews. Thus, in order to belong to the Zionist-national discourse, the Arab Jews had to perform and practice Judaism. Religion, in that sense, was a means to the recruitment of the Mizrahi Jews into the Jewish nationality. Yet religion at the same time also marked them as an "Ethnic" group separate from the secular (Ashkenazi) Israeliness. For Shenhav, religion and nationality are not binary categories but are connected in dynamic relations. Zionist nationalism confiscated Judaism and did contain religious lineaments, but those were nationalized and re-formed. Shenhav does not suggest that Zionism made the Mizrahi Jews religious, but that Zionism orientalized them through religion. Thus, They could only exist within the national Zionist discourse by being classified as religious Jews, and that is why the intermediate category of Masortim was created.

Shenhav argued that this Arab Jewish identity is a hybrid one, and is in part the result of dual consciousness - national and colonial - of Zionism. Yet he does not argue that contemporary Mizrahi identity is Arab-Jewish, but rather that it was a concept with a certain history that was cut off. So from a critical position, Shenhav accepts the conceptualization of the Mizrahi in the Israeli political and ethnic discussion since, according to him, the common experience of the various "communities" in Israel - in the education system, the IDF, the development towns and so forth - has blurred their distinctions and created a great deal of similarity between them.

The book's second central theme revolves around the connection between the Arab-Jews and the Palestinians. Shenhav's claim is that the Iraqi government's nationalization of the Iraqi Jews' property served as a governmental excuse for Israel's keeping of the Palestinian refugees' property following their exodus. Israel could thus argue for an interrelatedness between the two and claim that a population and capital exchange took place.

=== Postcolonialism and multiculturalism ===
From a postcolonial and epistemological perspective obligating identity politics, Shenhav believes the Israeli society must become multi-ethnic and therefore multi-culturalist. Among his publications on the subject is the anthology Coloniality and the Postcolonial Condition which included translations of founding texts by writers such as Frantz Fanon, Homi K. Bhabha and Edward Said.

Shenhav focuses his multiculturalist program mostly around the postcolonialist discourse, but also includes the postmodernist and feminist ones. For Shenhav, identity is a dynamic, constructivist, random and non-primordial concept, and seeks to deconstruct the social and cultural constructions (which he sees as basically European) in order develop a perspective that would advance identity politics. Shenhav admits the existence of an asymmetry between the way in which he negates a substantive identity and criticizes the formation of a Hegemonic identity, while encouraging the formation of another substantive identity he wants to liberate within his identity politics. In his opinion, this can be morally justified since an analogy cannot be made between the oppressors and the oppressed and between the rulers and the ruled.

Shenhav seeks to look at the postcolonial and postmodern discourse frames not merely as critical and deconstructivist frameworks, but rather as ones proposing a principal basis to change reality. Therefore, he negates one option of liberal multiculturalism which asks for a liberal democracy promising full equality between its citizens by overcoming the mechanisms of oppression and discrimination; and also a second option of a liberal multiculturalism which asks for a liberal democracy which institutionalizes the various groups of society. He thinks nationality, wisely using the values of liberalism and democracy, is major a mechanism of oppression and discrimination in the Israeli society. Therefore, he believes it is not enough for liberal democracy to grant equality to its minorities, since it also renders the "majority" group transparent. Appropriate multiculturalist alternatives, according to Shenhav, may include, for instance, a cultural/national autonomy to the Israeli Arabs, or the establishment of a binational state in Israel or the West Bank. Shenhav suggests the multiculturalist arrangements be in accordance with the degrees of openness of various groups of society, and the degrees of closeness between them. He also stresses the importance of cultural representations and distributive justice.

Alexander Jacobson described the concept of a two state solution to the Israeli-Palestinian conflict as unrealistic.

== Selected publications ==
=== Books ===
- Shenhav, Yehouda (1995). The Organization Machine: A Critical Inquiry into the Foundations of Management Theory (in Hebrew). Tel Aviv: Schocken. ISBN 965-19-0380-5.
- Shenhav, Yehouda A. (1999). Manufacturing Rationality: The Engineering Foundations of the Managerial Revolution. Oxford University Press. p. 256. ISBN 0-19-925000-6.
- Shenhav, Yehouda; Yossi Yonah (2005). What is Multiculturalism? On the Politics of Identity in Israel (in Hebrew). Tel Aviv: Bavel. ISBN 965-512-100-3.
- Shenhav, Yehouda (2006). The Arab Jews: A Postcolonial Reading of Nationalism, Religion, and Ethnicity. Stanford University Press. p. 280. ISBN 0-8047-5296-6.
- Shenhav, Yehouda (2012). Beyond the Two States Solution: A Jewish Political Essay. London: Polity Press [an earlier version appeared also in Hebrew: Am-Oved Press, 2010, Published also in Arabic: يهودا شنهاف. في مصيدة الخط الاخضر. مدار المركز الفلسطيني للدراسات الاسرائلية رام اللة فلسطين (ترجمة: سعيد عياش) 2011]. p. 256. ISBN 978-0745660295.

=== Monographs ===
- Shenhav, Yehouda (1991). Managerial Ideologies in the Age of Rationality (in Hebrew). Tel Aviv: Broadcast University Series. p. 102. ISBN 965-05-0579-2.

=== Edited books ===
- Hever, Hannan; Shenhav, Yehouda; Motzafi-Haller, Pnina, eds. (2002). Mizrahim In Israel: A Critical Observation into Israel's Ethnicity (in Hebrew). Tel-Aviv and Jerusalem: The Vanleer Institute and Ha’Kibutz HaMeuchad (Hebrew). ISBN 965-02-0172-6.
- Shenhav Yehouda, ed. (2003). Space, Land and Home: The Origin of the Israeli Territorial Regime (in Hebrew). Tel-Aviv and Jerusalem: The Vanleer Institute and Ha’Kibutz HaMeuchad (Hebrew). ISBN 965-02-0173-4.
- Shenhav Yehouda, ed. (2004). Coloniality and the Postcolonial Condition (in Hebrew). Tel-Aviv and Jerusalem: The Vanleer Institute and Ha’Kibutz HaMeuchad (Hebrew). ISBN 965-02-0232-3.
- ʻôrekîm, Dānî Fîlq ... (2004). Coloniality and the Postcolonial Condition (in Hebrew). Yehouda Shenhav (ed.). Tel-Aviv and Jerusalem: The Vanleer Institute and Ha’Kibutz HaMeuchad. ISBN 965-02-0232-3.
- Shenhav, Yehouda; Yonah, Yossi, eds. (2008). Racism in Israel (in Hebrew). Tel-Aviv and Jerusalem: The Vanleer Institute and Ha’Kibutz HaMeuchad (Hebrew). ISBN 978-965-02-0439-6.
- Shenhav, Yehouda; Schmidt, Christoph; Zelniker, Shimshon, eds. (2009). State of Exception and State of Emergency (in Hebrew). Tel-Aviv and Jerusalem: The Vanleer Institute and Ha’Kibutz HaMeuchad (Hebrew). ISBN 978-965-02-0490-7.
