= Hernando de Soto (economist) =

Peruvian economist

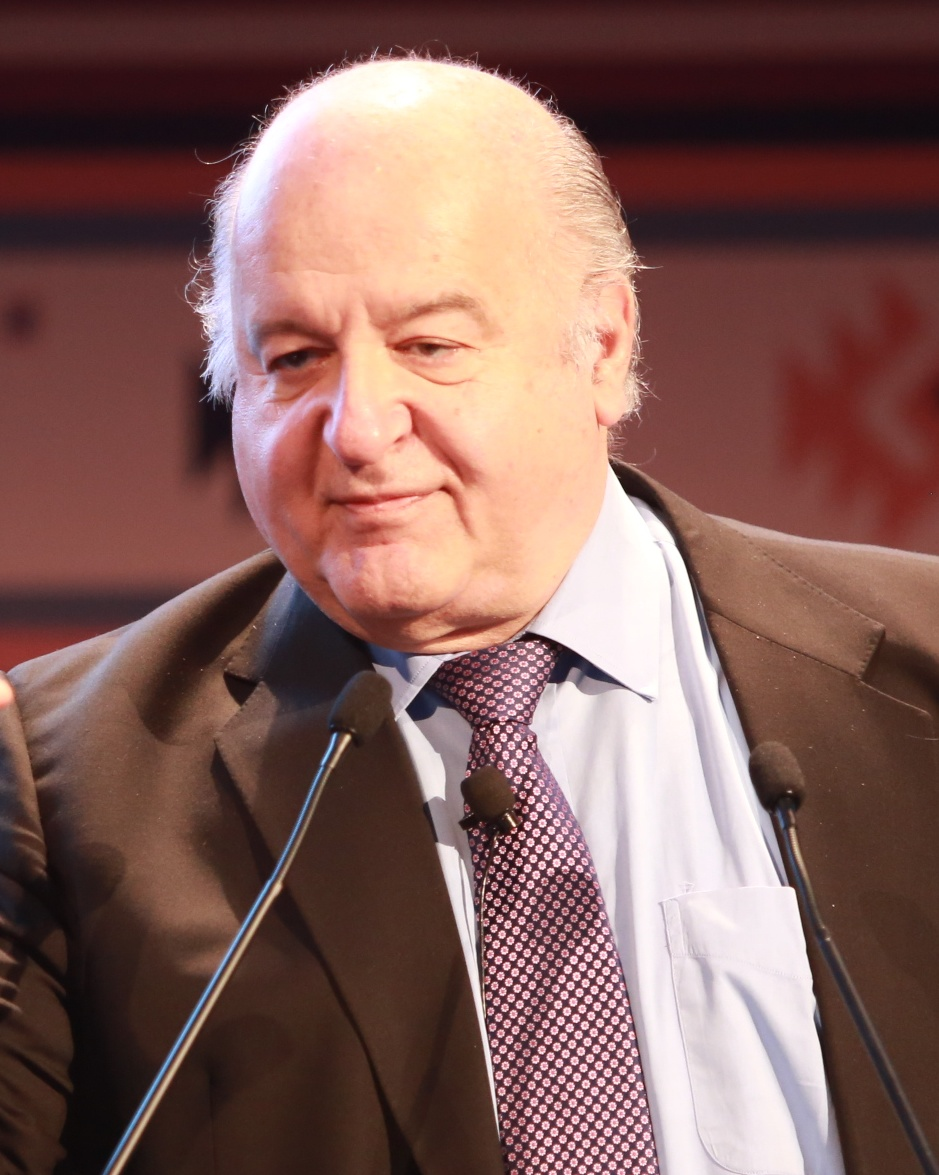
- De Soto in 2014
- Born: Hernando de Soto Polar; 2 June 1941 (age 85); Arequipa, Peru
- Education: University of Geneva (BA); Geneva Graduate Institute (MA)
- Political party: Independent (before 2020; 2021–2024; 2025–present)
- Other political affiliations: Progresemos (2024–2025); Avanza País (2020–2021)
- Spouse(s): Gerarda of Orleans-Borboun and Parodi Delfino (div.); María del Carmen Toro (div.)
- Partner: Carla Olivieri

Academic background
- Influences: Milton Friedman; Friedrich Hayek; Bruno Leoni

Academic work
- Discipline: The economics of the informal sector and property rights theory
- Institutions: Institute for Liberty and Democracy
- Notable ideas: Dead capital
- Website: https://www.ild.org.pe

Hernando de Soto Polar (/dəˈsoʊtoʊ/; born 2 June 1941) is a Peruvian economist. He is known for his work on the informal economy and on the importance of business and property rights. He is the current president of the Institute for Liberty and Democracy (ILD), a think tank located in Lima, Peru, that is devoted to promoting economic development in developing countries.

In Peru, de Soto's advisory has been recognized as inspiring the economic guidelines—including the loosening of economic regulation, the introduction of austerity measures and the utilization of neoliberal policies—that were ultimately adopted by the government of Alberto Fujimori and established in the 1993 Constitution of Peru. De Soto would go on to support Alberto's daughter, Keiko Fujimori, serving as an advisor during her presidential campaigns. De Soto worked closely with various Peruvian governments, even serving as a negotiator for the Peru–United States Trade Promotion Agreement. After years of speculation, de Soto ran for the Peruvian presidency in the 2021 presidential election, placing fourth in an atomized race of 18 nominees. He subsequently held meetings with Pedro Castillo during his administration, asked Dina Boluarte to resign from the presidency during the social unrest, and attempted to run in the 2026 elections for the Progresemos party, although he ultimately withdrew his candidacy.

Internationally, de Soto helped inspire the Washington Consensus macroeconomic prescriptions and was credited by economist John Williamson, who coined the consensus' name. He also supported the creation of the North American Free Trade Agreement (NAFTA), with George H.W. Bush praising his promotion of free trade when announcing the North American agreement. Other heads of state have recognized de Soto, including Bill Clinton, Vladimir Putin, Emmanuel Macron, Ronald Reagan and Margaret Thatcher. The ILD has received praise from other people including Nobel laureate Milton Friedman, World Bank President James Wolfensohn, and former UN Secretary-General Javier Pérez de Cuéllar.

== Early life and education ==
De Soto was born on 2 June 1941 in Arequipa, Peru. His father José Alberto Soto was a Peruvian diplomat and lawyer. After the 1948 military coup in Peru, his parents chose exile in Europe, taking their two young sons with them. His father worked for the International Labour Organization following their exile and would often send de Soto back to Peru during the summer months.

In exile, de Soto was educated in Switzerland where he attended the International School of Geneva. He studied social psychology in National University of Saint Augustine in Arequipa, Peru. He returned to Geneva and received a bachelor's degree in economics from the University of Geneva. In 1967, he earned a master's degree in international law and economics from Graduate Institute of International Studies, also in Geneva.

His younger brother Álvaro served in the Peruvian diplomatic corps in Lima, New York City and Geneva and was seconded to United Nations in 1982. He retired from the U.N. in 2007 with the title rank of Assistant Under-Secretary-General; his last position was as the UN Special Coordinator for the Middle East Peace Process.

There is some controversy around his surname, as his father's surname is Soto, while Hernando's one is de Soto. According to the Peruvian writer, and Nobel prize winner, Mario Vargas Llosa, he changed the surname in order to sound more "aristocratic".

== Economics career ==
Following his post-graduate studies, he worked as an economist for the General Agreement on Tariffs and Trade, a precursor to the World Trade Organization, as well as president of the Committee of the Copper Exporting Countries Organization, CEO of Universal Engineering Corporation and a principal for Swiss Bank Corporation.

=== Founding of the Institute for Liberty and Democracy ===
De Soto returned to Peru on the behalf of gold placer investors at the age of 38 in 1979 at a time when neoliberal policy was moving from the fringes of economic theory to mainstream practice. Upon de Soto's return in 1979, he met with Friedrich Hayek, a free market proponent who helped create the Mont Pelerin Society. Hayek, who sought to promote neoliberalism through a network of "second hand dealers", choosing de Soto. After making connections with Hayek, de Soto was acquainted with Sir Antony Fisher, a British businessman who created the Atlas Network, a nonprofit libertarian umbrella group that consolidated funds and research from businesses in the United States and Europe in order to create neoliberal organizations in developing countries.

With the assistance and funding of Fisher and the Atlas Network, de Soto created the Institute for Liberty and Democracy (ILD) in 1981, one of the first neoliberal organizations in Latin America. De Soto would later state "Anthony gave us enormous amounts of information and advice on how to get organized. ... It was on the basis of his vision that we designed the structure of the ILD". In 1984, de Soto received further assistance from the United States president Ronald Reagan's administration, with the National Endowment for Democracy's Center for International Private Enterprise (CIPE) providing ILD with funding and education for advertising campaigns. In 2003, the CIPE would later describe the ILD as being one of its most successful programs. Other funding was then provided by United States Agency for International Development (USAID) and the Smith Richardson Foundation, with USAID assisting the ILD with staging international networks to propagate their ideals. The ILD would then seek popular support in Peru by making informal housing their main concern.

=== Fujimori government ===
Between 1988 and 1995, de Soto and the Institute for Liberty and Democracy (ILD) were mainly responsible for some four hundred initiatives, laws, and regulations that led to significant changes in Peru's economic system. The ILD became involved with the Peruvian economy at the end of President Alan García's term. De Soto's group began to grow and advertised to the Peruvian public promoting their legislative goals, borrowing some advertisements from American lotteries.

De Soto then began to serve informally as "the President's personal representative" for the first three years of the administration of Alberto Fujimori. De Soto had originally been a part of the economics advisory team of the unsuccessful presidential candidate Mario Vargas Llosa in 1990, but Fujimori later requested de Soto's assistance in resolving the economic issues that were produced by the crisis of the 1980s. The New York Times described de Soto as an "overseas salesman" for the government of Alberto Fujimori in 1990, writing that he had represented the government when meeting with creditors and the United States representatives. Others dubbed de Soto as the "informal president" for Fujimori.

In a recommendation to Fujimori, de Soto called for a "shock" to Peru's economy. De Soto convinced then-president Fujimori to travel to New York City in a meeting organized by the Peruvian Javier Pérez de Cuéllar, secretary-general of the United Nations, where they met with the heads of the International Monetary Fund, the World Bank, and the Inter-American Development Bank, who convinced him to follow the guidelines for economic policy set by the international financial institutions. The policies included a 300 percent tax increase, unregulated prices and privatizing two-hundred and fifty state-owned entities. The policies of de Soto caused macroeconomic stability and a reduction in the rate of inflation, though Peru's poverty rate remained largely unchanged with over half of the population living in poverty in 1998. Peru would not see increased growth until the 2000s commodities boom.

University of Chicago political scientist Susan C. Stokes believes that de Soto's influence helped change the policies of Fujimori from a Keynesian to a neoliberal approach. De Soto also inspired Fujimori's anti-drug initiatives. The Cato Institute and The Economist magazine have argued that de Soto's policy prescriptions brought him into conflict with and eventually helped to undermine the Shining Path (Sendero Luminoso) guerrilla movement. By granting titles to small coca farmers in the two main coca-growing areas, they argued that the Shining Path was deprived of safe havens, recruits and money, and the leadership was forced to cities where they were arrested. Attacks were launched against the ILD and de Soto in light of the statements by Shining Path leader Abimael Guzmán, who saw ILD as a threat.

==== Land title initiative ====
Between 1992 and 1994, de Soto's ILD piloted a land title program to formally register 200,000 Peruvian households and two years later, expanded the program to Lima and seven other metropolitan areas that held ninety percent of informal housing developments within Peru. The program concluded in 2004 with 1.4 million households being registered and 920,000 land titles being provided.

Contrary to de Soto's claims, the land title project provided no change to the access of credit to poor Peruvians. The ILD's figures reported that homeowners also saw their hours at work increase by seventeen percent, while working at home decreased by forty-seven percent and child labor was reduced by twenty-eight percent, with the group stating that the latter two statistics were due to homeowners and their children no longer being required to defend their homes from seizure. According to Timothy Mitchell, the ILD's findings were "implausible" since the conclusion was already framed by the ILD, neighborhoods were already collective with limited property conflicts and those included in the project were already pursuing work outside of their homes when they chose to become involved. Following the findings, the ILD would distance itself from advocating credit access and instead promote increased work hours among formal landowners.

==== Resignation and condemnation of Fujimori ====
De Soto resigned from his post as the "Personal Representative of the President" in January 1992, two months prior to the 1992 Peruvian coup d'état, and condemned Fujimori's motivations being influenced by Director of the National Intelligence Service Vladimiro Montesinos, hinting at signs of corruption. In his letter, he called into question "the validity of the anti-drug agreement" that Fujimori adopted. He stated his reasons to resigning as due to "drug trafficking from within the State that sabotages efforts in the fight against drugs", and reportedly due to differences with Montesinos. Both Montesinos and Fujimori would later be indicted for corruption and violation of human rights.

Two months after de Soto resigned, Fujimori launched a self-coup which de Soto again condemned as "stupid, unproductive and blatantly unconstitutional". According to de Soto, one month after the coup the Minister of Economy Carlos Boloña contacted de Soto in desperation, after dozens of countries sanctioned Peru economically by cutting it off from investment and credit in response to the undemocratic event. Boloña resigned from his ministerial post, and de Soto lastly travelled to the 1992 Organization of American States summit in the Bahamas with Fujimori and pressured him to accept democratic elections to prevent another macroeconomic crisis.

=== International policy ===
==== Washington Consensus ====
De Soto was a main contributor to the Washington Consensus, a set of ten economic prescription requirements set by International Monetary Fund (IMF), World Bank and United States Department of the Treasury towards countries in economic crisis. Neoliberal economists in the United States utilized de Soto's arguments as a way to promote the consensus. English economist John Williamson, who coined the term "Washington Consensus", partly credited de Soto for the prescriptions, saying his work was "the outcome of the worldwide intellectual trends to which Latin America provided". For United States presidents Ronald Reagan and George H. W. Bush, according to Kate Geohegan of Harvard University's Davis Center for Russian and Eurasian Studies, "de Soto's ideas offered a compelling new framework for explaining the problem of economic underdevelopment that seemed to affirm the wisdom of neoliberal policies like adjustment lending".

The Washington Consensus would result in socioeconomic exclusion and weakened trade unions in Latin America, resulting with unrest in the region. The consensus resulted with a shrinking middle class in Latin America that prompted dissatisfaction of neoliberalism, a turn to the political left and populist leaders by the late-1990s; in Bolivia, support for Evo Morales was established.

==== North American Free Trade Agreement (NAFTA) ====
Upon its signing, de Soto expressed support for the creation of the North American Free Trade Agreement (NAFTA). When announcing NAFTA at the Annual Meeting of the Boards of Governors of the International Monetary Fund and World Bank Group on 27 September 1989, President George H. W. Bush – who had adopted de Soto's work for the United States' foreign policy towards the economies of developing countries – praised de Soto for helping inspire free trade.

In his speech announcing NAFTA at the 1989 meeting, Bush stated:

All across the world, there has been an almost simultaneous rediscovery of the power created when individuals are given the freedom to act in their own best interests. ... True, we are here today mainly to discuss economic freedom. ... The Peruvian economist, Hernando de Soto, has helped us understand a worldwide economic phenomenon. ... When left alone by government, people everywhere organize their lives in remarkably similar ways. De Soto's prescription offers a clear and promising alternative to economic stagnation in Latin America and other parts of the world. ... All our nations have a responsibility to ensure a fair and open trading system.

According to de Soto in 1993, "the virtues of a modern society" were able to be introduced to Latin America as a result of NAFTA. He would later say in 2001 that Mexico's economy and institution would progress due to NAFTA, concluding "All poor countries are lumped together and all rich countries are lumped together; there's this imitation effect".

=== Advisory work ===
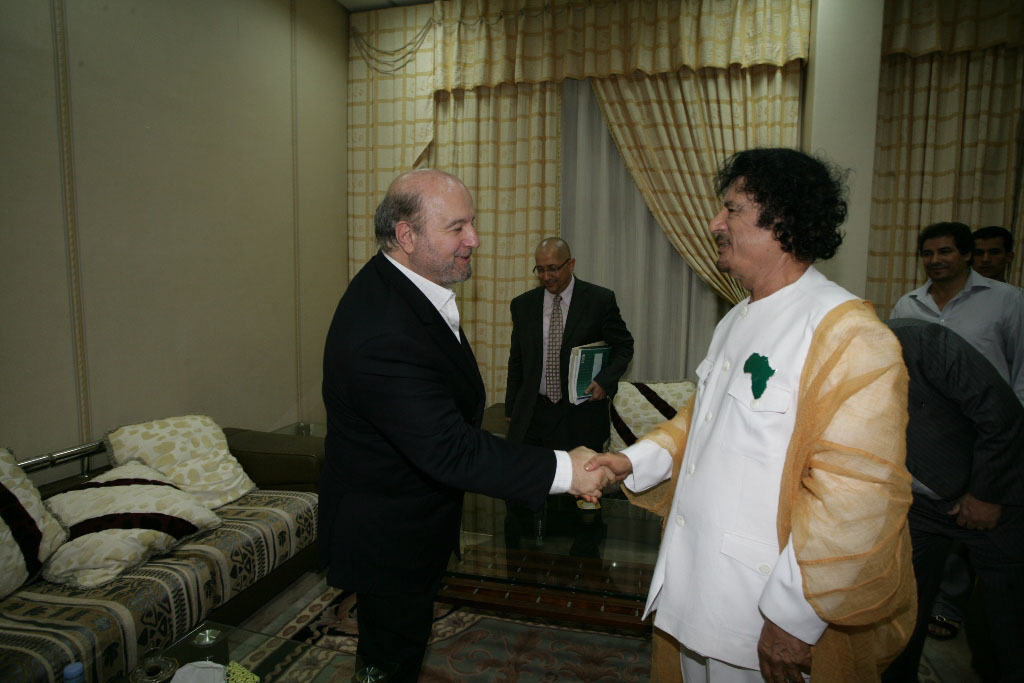
Hernando de Soto and Muammar Gaddafi in 2008 after Libya signed a contract with the Institute for Liberty and Democracy

Following its foundation in Peru, de Soto's institute, the ILD, has worked in dozens of countries. Heads of state in over 35 countries have sought the ILD's services to discuss how ILD's theories on property rights could potentially improve their economies. After the split with Fujimori, he and his institute designed similar programs in El Salvador, Haiti, Tanzania, and Egypt and has worked beside the World Bank, though the institute did not advocate for land title programs and instead promoted longer work hours. De Soto has received criticism of having relationships with controversial political leaders such as Alberto Fujimori and Libyan president Muammar Gaddafi, with de Soto responding to such statements saying "I have advised dictators, but that is irrelevant".

In 2006, de Soto served as a personal representative of President Alan García, and negotiated the Peru-United States Free Trade Agreement after 11 rounds of negotiation. In 2009, the ILD turned its attention back to Peru and the plight of the indigenous peoples of the Peruvian Amazon jungle. In response to Peru's President García's call to all Peruvians to present their proposals toward solving the problems leading to the bloody incidents in Bagua, the ILD assessed the situation and presented its preliminary findings. ILD published a short videotaped documentary, The Mystery of Capital among the Indigenous Peoples of the Amazon, summarizing its findings from indigenous communities in Alaska, Canada and the Peruvian jungle.

After previously working with her father Alberto, de Soto joined Keiko Fujimori with her election campaigns for the 2011 and 2016 Peruvian general election when Fujimori committed to implementing de Soto's property rights reforms. In an interview during the first campaign of Keiko Fujimori, he also stated that Osama bin Laden's death was achieved thanks to land titling, a concept he holds as a way out of poverty. As part of the Fuerza Popular team, he harshly criticized Peruvians for Change candidate Pedro Pablo Kuczynski, whom he described as a "deserter and coward." In an interview with the newspaper Perú21, De Soto said that Kuczynski "is a gringo who does not know Peru, because there are those who do. He is a foreigner to the Peruvian reality."

== Political career ==
=== 2001 Peruvian general election ===
For the 2001 Peruvian general election, de Soto sought to run for president with his Popular Capital party, though he failed to register the party on time in order to participate. At the time, he sought support from left-wing political groups for his candidacy, though they disagreed with his liberal economic policies. He would later become a critic of such groups.

After learning about de Soto's inability to register for the election, former president and leader of the APRA Alan Garcia offered the economist the APRA's presidential nomination. De Soto declined the offer, claiming that he would have been "a figurehead president susceptible to the whims of disciplined APRA congressmen". Later, Garcia offered de Soto the position of Prime Minister, a role that Alberto Fujimori had also offered de Soto. De Soto declined again, not wanting to be held accountable for Garcia's government policies.

=== 2021 presidential campaign ===
De Soto announced his candidacy for president in September 2020 under the party Avanza País. Prior to the announcement, De Soto expressed hesitation to formally run for president lest politicizing and potentially delegitimizing work done by the ILD and himself on dead capital.

On 30 October 2020, De Soto presented his technical team, which included the former president of CONFIEP Miguel Vega Alvear, businessman Carlos Añaños, former Fujimori minister and first Vice President Francisco Tudela, former GEIN commander Marco Miyashiro, the former head of the Operation Chavín de Huántar José Williams, the diplomat Álvaro de Soto, among others.

On 14 December 2020, de Soto shared an alleged secret poll in Beto Ortiz's show in Willax Televisión. That poll ranked him first. De Soto spoke in the interview that: "The way this (the cadres) comes to us is because people very close to the state apparatus, it seems, were outraged at the enormous difference between the polls they handle."

In January 2021, a strike was filed that considered that the Avanza País electoral court had not been properly formed. This strike was declared unfounded by the JEE.

Another strike was filed against him by a citizen, because he points out that Hernando de Soto "has entered in the Academic Training section of the resume, which has the academic degree 'demi license en sciences economiques' awarded by the University of Geneva, which would have been obtained in 1964.”. But since this degree or title is not registered with SUNEDU, false information would be declared and it should be excluded from the candidacy.

On 24 February 2021, following an approach to advise Francisco Sagasti on the COVID-19 pandemic management in Peru, De Soto announced the first Peruvian shadow cabinet. Mainly composed of his campaign technical team, the main purpose of the opposition cabinet is to offer an alternative in order for the government to concur and apply during the crisis.

De Soto rejected the exclusion of Rafael López Aliaga, an electoral rival in the 2021 elections, for which he appeared at the demonstration of his followers on the outskirts of the JNE, in which Lopez Aliaga was, who praised him.

De Soto was caught in controversy surrounding Vacunagate, a scandal where political elites in Peru were able to be vaccinated against COVID-19 ahead of schedule. He initially denied having received a COVID-19 vaccine "from any Peruvian", though it was later reported that he flew twice to the United States to be vaccinated. During presidential debates de Soto promised to work with the United Nations to prevent foreign "criminals or poor people" from entering Peru, stating "Let their governments take care of them, we will take care of ours". He proposed reforming Peru's education for less foreign reliance and increasing the health budget.

Ultimately, de Soto placed fourth in an atomized race of 18 nominees.

=== Prime Minister designate of José María Balcázar's government ===
On February 22, 2026, the government of José María Balcázar announced Hernando de Soto as the new prime minister. However, his appointment was cancelled and Denisse Miralles was sworn in as prime minister instead. In the aftermath, he stated that repeated calls from César Acuña during his proposed appointment as prime minister suggested the latter’s political influence in the formation of the cabinet, contributing to his decision not to assume the post.

== Main thesis ==
The main message of de Soto's work and writings is that no nation can have a strong market economy without adequate participation in an information framework that records ownership of property and other economic information. Unreported, unrecorded economic activity results in that many small entrepreneurs lack legal ownership of their property, making it difficult for them to obtain credit, sell the business, or expand. They cannot seek legal remedies to business conflicts in court, since they do not have legal ownership. Lack of information on income prevents governments from collecting taxes and acting for the public welfare:

The existence of such massive exclusion generates two parallel economies, legal and extra legal. An elite minority enjoys the economic benefits of the law and globalization, while the majority of entrepreneurs are stuck in poverty, where their assets—adding up to more than US$10 trillion worldwide—languish as dead capital in the shadows of the law.

To survive, to protect their assets, and to do as much business as possible, the extralegals create their own rules. But because these local arrangements are full of shortcomings and are not easily enforceable, the extralegals also create their own social, political and economic problems that affect the society at large.

Since the fall of the Berlin Wall, responsible nations around the developing world have worked hard to make the transition to a market economy, but have in general failed. Populist leaders have used this failure of the free market system to wipe out poverty in the developing world to beat their "anti-globalization" drums. But the ILD believes that the real enemy is within the flawed legal systems of developing nations that make it virtually impossible for the majority of their people—and their assets—to gain a stake in the market. The people of these countries have talent, enthusiasm, and an astonishing ability to wring a profit out of practically nothing`.

What the poor majority in the developing world do not have is easy access to the legal system which, in the advanced nations of the world and for the elite in their countries, is the gateway to economic success, for it is in the legal system where property documents are created and standardized according to law. That documentation builds a public memory that permits society to engage in such crucial economic activities as identifying and gaining access to information about individuals, their assets, their titles, rights, charges and obligations; establishing the limits of liability for businesses; knowing an asset's previous economic situation; assuring protection of third parties; and quantifying and valuing assets and rights. These public memory mechanisms in turn facilitate such opportunities as access to credit, the establishment of systems of identification, the creation of systems for credit and insurance information, the provision for housing and infrastructure, the issue of shares, the mortgage of property and a host of other economic activities that drive a modern market economy.

== Work and research ==
Since 2008, de Soto has been refining his thesis about the importance of property rights to development in response to his organization's findings that a number of new global threats have "property rights distortions" at their root. In essays, that appeared from early 2009 into 2012 in media outlets in the U.S. and Europe, de Soto argued that the reason why the U.S. and European economies were mired in recession was the result of a "knowledge crisis" not a financial one. He has termed housing assets as "dead capital," in his papers on household ownership and deeds.

"Capitalism lives in two worlds," De Soto wrote in the Financial Times in January 2012. "There is the visible one of palm trees and Panamanian ships, but it is the other – made up of the property information cocooned in laws and records – that allows us to organize and understand fragments of reality and join them creatively." De Soto argued that the knowledge in those public memory systems, which "helped Capitalism triumph," was distorted over the past 15 years or so. "Until this knowledge system is repaired," he wrote, "neither US nor European capitalism will recover."

In another series of articles that appeared in US and Europe in 2011, de Soto used the findings of ILD field research in Egypt, Tunisia and Libya to make his case for "the economic roots of the Arab Spring." The ongoing Arab revolutions, he argued, were "economic revolutions" driven mainly by the frustrations of 200 million ordinary Arabs who depended on the informal economy for their livelihoods. He pointed to the ILD's earlier 2004 findings in Egypt, which revealed the nation's largest employer with 92% of the property in the informal economy – assets worth almost $247 billion. Also, as proof of the extent of desperation among MENA’s entrepreneurs, he elaborated ILD's exclusive research on Mohamed Bouazizi, the Tunisian street vendor whose public self-immolation in protest of the expropriation of his goods and scale literally sparked the Jasmine Revolution in Tunisia, which spread unrest through the Arab world.

After losing core funding from USAID, ILD laid off the majority of their employees from their San Isidro office. In 2014–2015, de Soto and a small team working out of his house began to attempt to guide the political process in Peru, as presidential elections were due to take place in 2016, by finding solutions to the ongoing national mining crisis. De Soto has been a strong advocate for the formalisation of the informal miners that are scattered throughout Peru. Since 2014, several large national investment projects, including Las Bambas, and Tia Maria have been disrupted by violent protests by informal miners against government regulation and formal extractive industries. In July 2015, de Soto alleged that former Shining Path militants who have taken up the ecological cause were paralyzing some $70 billion in mining investment in Peru. De Soto's stated goal is to determine the roots of informal hostility against multinationals and identify what is needed to build a national social contract on extractive industries that could harmonize their property interests with those of multinationals as opposed to creating conflict.

=== De Soto applies thesis to terrorism ===
In October 2014, de Soto published an article in The Wall Street Journal, "The Capitalist Cure for Terrorism", that stated an aggressive agenda for economic empowerment was needed in the Middle East in order to defeat terrorist groups like ISIL. He argued that the U.S. should promote an agenda similar to what was successfully used in Peru to defeat the Shining Path in the 1990s. He also mentions in the article that local policymakers in the Middle East are missing the fact that if ordinary people cannot play the game legally, they will be far less able to resist a terrorist offensive. The article received praise among high-level global Right-Wing politicians such as US presidential candidates Rand Paul and Jeb Bush.

Once again In January 2016, de Soto released his second article, How to Win the War on Terror, which focused on defeating terrorism through promoting strong property rights. The article was distributed by Project Syndicate and published in dozens of countries and languages, including in Switzerland by the World Economic Forum in advance of their 2016 forum.

=== De Soto challenges Thomas Piketty ===
In 2014, de Soto started to refute French economist Thomas Piketty’s thesis by arguing that his recent attacks against capital in his worldwide best seller book Capital in the 21st Century were unjustified. His op-ed article challenging Piketty, ‘The Poor Against Piketty’ (French: Les pauvres contre Piketty) was first published in France's news magazine Le Point in April 2015.

De Soto argued that Piketty's statistics ignore the ninety percent of the world population that lives in developing countries and former Soviet states, whose inhabitants produce and hold their capital in the informal sector. Furthermore, he states that his institute's global research proves that most people actually want more rather than less capital. Finally, he argues that the wars against capital, which Piketty claims are coming, have already begun under Europe's nose in the form of the Arab Spring in the Middle East and North Africa.

=== De Soto addresses Pope Francis ===
In February 2016, he wrote an article addressing Pope Francis’s trip to Mexico titled "A Mexican Impasse for the Pope." The article encourages the Pope and the Vatican to address the lack of property rights among the poor in countries like Mexico as a solution to global refugee crises.

A week later, de Soto published a second article in Fortune Magazine addressing the Pope's and US Republican presidential candidate Donald Trump’s public spat over building a wall on the Mexican-USA border. The article titled, What Pope Francis Should Really Say to Donald Trump, conveys five property rights related thoughts that the Pope should use to respond to Trump. The article led to many different opinion articles featured in conservative outlets such as Breitbart and Investors Business Daily.

=== Blockchain work ===
In May 2015, de Soto attended the 1st Annual Block Chain Summit hosted by British billionaire Richard Branson at his private Caribbean residence, Necker Island. De Soto was one of three moderators, along with Michael J. Casey, former Wall Street Journal senior columnist and Matthew Bishop, editor at The Economist. Advocates of blockchain technology argue that it is well-suited to acting as a public ledger to help achieve de Soto's objective of formalising the informally held property rights of groups like the indigenous peoples of Peru.

De Soto presented a property application of bitcoin to Sheikh Nahyan bin Mubarak Al Nahyan of the United Arab Emirates and financial authorities of Abu Dhabi at a second Blockchain summit held in Abu Dhabi in 2015.

== Reception ==
=== Ideology ===
De Soto's promotion of liberalism in developing countries has faced criticism as supporting the exploitation of poorer nations. Social scientist Joseph Hanlon described De Soto as "an economist of the far right" and that "the risk that people will be thrown off their land is fundamental to De Soto's system of bringing capitalism to the poor", summarizing that landlessness for some impoverished individuals "is intrinsic to his strategy". The Guardian described de Soto as "a radical free-market economist". Geohegan states that the United States government under President Ronald Reagan and his successor George H. W. Bush adopted de Soto's work as the main strategy of the United States' foreign policy towards developing countries since "de Soto's interpretation of underdevelopment seemed to validate the emerging 'neoliberal' US policies". According to de Soto, Peru was not poor because of international inequality enforced by the globalized economy but due to Peru's own economic regulation. Reagan – whose administration provided funding to found de Soto's ILD – George H. W. Bush and Bush's successor Bill Clinton would continue promoting de Soto's work. Timothy Mitchell says that de Soto's background as a European economist was often ignored by American neoliberals promoting him, writing that his popularity and experience "came to depend on his identity as a neoliberal from the third world, willing to describe the poverty of the global south as a self-inflicted injury unconnected to its relationship to the north". Administrator of the United States Agency for International Development (USAID) Andrew Natsios would later advocate de Soto's work, stating "Instead of seeing the developing world as victims of capitalism, Hernando argues 'We're inflicting our own wounds' ... Since he is Peruvian, he can make this argument credibly".

The promotion of neoliberalism by de Soto was not only utilized by officials in the United States; other neoliberal economists endorsed de Soto due to his origins from the developing world as well, with Mitchell stating that his background "transformed de Soto into a very useful asset for the neoliberal movement". President of the Atlas Network, Alex Chaufen, said that de Soto was often discussed among the neoliberal community, stating "During the years I spent with Antony [Fisher] at Atlas, I couldn't recall any conversation, any speech about think tanks, any fundraising letter where he did not mention Hernando".

As de Soto began to work with the government of Gloria Macapagal Arroyo in the Philippines in 2004, investigative journalism website Bulatlat described de Soto's work as "rich people's reformism", writing "The secret to de Soto's and ILD's popularity among political, economic and developmental elites ultimately lies in their unashamed conservatism, defense of the status quo and promise of capitalist wealth for the world's poor and exploited. ... Elites get to keep the property they value so much and can continue exploiting and oppressing while the poor – and historically exploited and oppressed – are diverted from systemic struggles by the chimera of becoming wealthy entrepreneurs themselves". In his Planet of Slums, Mike Davis argues that de Soto, who Davis calls "the global guru of neo-liberal populism", is essentially promoting what the statist left in South America and India has always promoted individual land titling. Davis argues that titling is the incorporation into the formal economy of cities, which benefits more wealthy squatters but is disastrous for poorer squatters, and especially tenants who simply cannot afford incorporation into the fully commodified formal economy.

=== Property rights ===
De Soto's works on property rights has voiced diverse views on the effect of the titling of land. The findings at the conclusion of his land title program under Alberto Fujimori found that providing land titles did not provide poor Peruvians with greater access to credit. De Soto has been criticized for methodological and analytical reasons, while some activists have accused him of just wanting to be a representative figure of the prioritizing property rights movement. Some state that his theory does not offer anything new compared to traditional land reform. His emphasis on title formalization as the only reason behind economic growth in the United States has been subject to criticism. Property formalization in the United States may have happened as a result of different reasons including establishment of law and order, increased state control, greater institutional integration, increased economic efficiency, increased tax revenue, and greater equality.

==== Reception from scholars ====
Empirical studies by Argentine economists Sebastian Galiani and Ernesto Schargrodsky found a modest relationship between titling and credit market access (contradicting de Soto's research), but have also pointed out that families with titles "substantially increased housing investment, reduced household size, and improved the education of their children relative to the control group". In a 2012 book by Yale University political science methodologist Thad Dunning, he argues that Galiani and Schargrodsky's studies provide "highly credible" claims because the studies rely on true randomization, whereas De Soto's study did not (and is thus vulnerable to confounding variables).

"De Soto’s proposal is not wealth transfer, but wealth legalization. The poor of the world already possess trillions in assets now. De Soto is not distributing capital to anyone. By making them liquid, everyone’s capital pool grows dramatically". While analysing Schaefer's arguments, Roy writes, "de Soto’s ideas are seductive precisely because they only guarantee the latter, but in doing so promise the former". Robert J. Samuelson has argued against what he sees as de Soto's "single bullet" approach and has argued for a greater emphasis on culture and how local conditions affect people's perceptions of their opportunities.

In the Journal of Economic Literature, Christopher Woodruff of the University of California, San Diego criticized de Soto for overestimating the amount of wealth that land titling now informally owned property could unlock and argues that "de Soto's own experience in Peru suggests that land titling by itself is not likely to have much effect. Titling must be followed by a series of politically challenging steps. Improving the efficiency of judicial systems, rewriting bankruptcy codes, restructuring financial market regulations, and similar reforms will involve much more difficult choices by policymakers."

==== Reception from governmental officials ====
The argument for private and often individualist property regime comes under the question of societal legitimacy, may not be justified even if de Soto eyes bringing a unified system in a state or unification with the global economy.

His work has also received praise from two United Nations secretaries-general: Kofi Annan – "Hernando de Soto is absolutely right, that we need to rethink how we capture economic growth and development" – and Javier Pérez de Cuéllar – "A crucial contribution. A new proposal for change that is valid for the whole world." UN Special Rapporteur on the right to food, Olivier De Schutter, has questioned the insistence on titling as a means to protect security of tenure based on the risk that titling will undermine customary forms of tenure and insufficiently protect the rights of land users that depend on the commons, as well as the fear that titling schemes may lead to further reconcentration of land ownership.

A study commissioned by DFID, an agency of the U.K. government, further summarized many of the complications arising from implementing de Soto's policy recommendations when insufficient attention is paid to the local social context.

==== Reception from activists ====
Grassroots controlled and directed shack dwellers movements like Abahlali baseMjondolo in South Africa and the Homeless Workers' Movement (Movimento dos Trabalhadores Sem Teto – MTST) in Brazil have strenuously argued against individual titling and for communal and democratic systems of collective land tenure because this offers protection to the poorest and prevents 'downward raiding' in which richer people displace squatters once their neighborhoods are formalized.

=== Publications ===
Neoliberal politicians and organizations promoted de Soto's publications, with their endorsements and awards making his books bestsellers. Since the publication of The Mystery of Capital in 2000 and subsequent translations, his ideas have become increasingly influential in the field of development economics. Scholars have disputed that there is a significant relationship between land titles and credit market access.

In the World Development journal, a 1990 article by R. G. Rossini and J. J. Thomas of the London School of Economics questioned the statistical basis of de Soto's claims about the size of the informal economy in his first book The Other Path. The ILD responded in the same journal that Rossini and Thomas’ observations "neither [addressed] the central theme of the book, nor [did it address] the main body of quantitative evidence displayed to substantiate the importance of economic and legal barriers that give rise to informal activities. Instead, [they focused] exclusively on four empirical estimates that the book [mentioned] only in passing".

On 31 January 2012, de Soto and his publisher were fined by the Peruvian intellectual property rights organization INDECOPI for excluding the names of co-authors Enrique Ghersi and Mario Ghibellini in newer editions of his 1986 book The Other Path.

=== Relationship with elites ===
An article by Madeleine Bunting for The Guardian (UK) claimed that de Soto's suggestions would in some circumstances cause more harm than benefit and referred to The Mystery of Capital as "an elaborate smokescreen" used to obscure the issue of the power of the globalized elite. She cited de Soto's employment history as evidence of his bias in favor of the powerful. Reporter John Gravois also criticized de Soto for his ties to power circles, exemplified by his attendance at the Davos World Economic Forum. In response, de Soto told Gravois that this proximity to power would help de Soto educate the elites about poverty. Ivan Osorio of the Competitive Enterprise Institute has argued against Gravois's allegations, claiming that Gravois has misinterpreted many of de Soto's recommendations.

== Awards and accolades ==
Time magazine chose De Soto as one of the five leading Latin American innovators of the century in its special May 1999 issue "Leaders of the New Millennium", and included him among the 100 most influential people in the world in 2004. De Soto was also listed as one of the 15 innovators "who will reinvent your future" according to Forbes magazine's 85th anniversary edition. In January 2000, Entwicklung und Zusammenarbeit, the German development magazine, described de Soto as one of the most important development theoreticians. In October 2016, de Soto was honored with the Brigham–Kanner Property Rights Prize, awarded by the William & Mary Law School during the 13th Annual Brigham–Kanner Property Rights Conference, in recognition of his tireless advocacy of property rights reform as a tool to alleviate global poverty. Hernando de Soto is honorary co-chair for the World Justice Project.

Among the prizes he has received are:

1990

- The Fisher Prize from the Atlas Network

1995

- The Freedom Prize (Switzerland)

2002

- The Goldwater Award (USA)
- Adam Smith Award from the Association of Private Enterprise Education (USA)
- The CARE Canada Award for Outstanding Development Thinking (Canada)

2003

- Received the Downey Fellowship at Yale University
- The Democracy Hall of Fame International Award from the National Graduate University (USA)

2004

- The Templeton Freedom Prize (USA)
- The Milton Friedman Prize for Advancing Liberty (USA)
- The Royal Decoration of the Most Admirable Order of the Direkgunabhorn, 5th Class, (Thailand)

2005

- An honorary Doctor of Letters from the University of Buckingham (United Kingdom),
- The Americas Award (USA)
- Was named the Most Outstanding of 2004 for Economic Development at Home and Abroad by the Peruvian National Assembly of Rectors
- The Prize of Deutsche Stiftung Eigentum for exceptional contributions to the theory of property rights
- The 2004 IPAE Award by the Peruvian Institute of Business Administration
- The Academy of Achievement's Golden Plate Award 2005 (USA) in tribute to his outstanding accomplishments
- The BearingPoint, Forbes magazine's seventh Compass Award for Strategic Direction
- Was named as a "Fellow of the Class of 1930" by Dartmouth College.

2006

- The 2006 Bradley Prize for outstanding achievement by the Bradley Foundation.
- The 2006 Innovation Award (Social and Economic Innovation) from The Economist magazine (2 December 2006) for the promotion of property rights and economic development.

2007

- The Poder BCG Business Awards 2007, granted by Poder Magazine and the Boston Consulting Group, for the "Best Anti-Poverty Initiative"
- The anthology Die Zwölf Wichtigsten Ökonomen der Welt (The World's Twelve Most Influential Economists, 2007), included a profile of de Soto among a list that begins with Adam Smith and includes such recent winners of the Nobel Prize in Economics as Joseph Stiglitz and Amartya Sen.
- The 2007 Humanitarian Award in recognition of his work to help poor people participate in the market economy.

2009

- Honorary patron of the University Philosophical Society of Trinity College Dublin for having excelled in public life and made a worthy contribution to society.
- The inaugural Hernando de Soto Award for Democracy awarded by the Center for International Private Enterprise (CIPE) in recognition of his extraordinary achievements in furthering economic freedom in Peru and throughout the developing world.

2010

- The Hayek Medal for his theories on liberal development policy ("market economy from below") and for the appropriate implementation of his concepts by two Peruvian presidents.
- The Medal of the Presidency of the Italian Republic (Council of Ministers) in recognition of his contribution toward the betterment of humankind and having worked for the future of the earth through his commitment.

2016

- The 2016 Brigham–Kanner Property Rights Prize from William & Mary Law School during a ceremony in The Hague, Netherlands, in October 2016.

2017

- Recipient of the Global Award for Entrepreneurship Research 2017.

== Publications ==
=== Books ===
De Soto has published two books about economic development: The Other Path: The Invisible Revolution in the Third World in 1986 in Spanish (with a new edition in 2002 titled The Other Path, The Economic Answer to Terrorism) and in 2000, The Mystery of Capital: Why Capitalism Triumphs in the West and Fails Everywhere Else (ISBN 978-0465016150). Both books have been international bestsellers, translated into some 30 languages.

The original Spanish-language title of The Other Path is El Otro Sendero, an allusion to de Soto's alternative proposals for development in Peru, countering the attempts of the "Shining Path" ("Sendero Luminoso") to win the support of Peru's poor. Based on five years' worth of ILD research into the causes of massive informality and legal exclusion in Peru, the book was also a direct intellectual challenge to the Shining Path, offering to the poor of Peru not the violent overthrow of the system but "the other path" out of poverty, through legal reform. In response, the Senderistas added de Soto to their assassination list. In July 1992, the terrorists sent a second car bomb into ILD headquarters in Lima, killing 3 and wounding 19.

In addition, he has written, with Francis Cheneval, Swiss Human Rights Book Volume 1: Realizing Property Rights, published in 2006 – a collection of papers presented at an international symposium in Switzerland in 2006 on the urgency of property rights in impoverished countries for small business owners, women, and other vulnerable groups, such as the poor and political refugees. The book includes a paper on the ILD's work in Tanzania delivered by Hernando de Soto.

- De Soto, Hernando. The Other Path: The Invisible Revolution in the Third World. Harpercollins, 1989. ISBN 0-06-016020-9
- De Soto, Hernando. The Mystery of Capital: Why Capitalism Triumphs in the West and Fails Everywhere Else. Basic Books, 2000. ISBN 0-465-01614-6
- De Soto, Hernando. The Other Path: The Economic Answer to Terrorism. Basic Books, 2002. ISBN 0-465-01610-3
- De Soto, Hernando and Francis Cheneval. Swiss Human Rights Book Volume 1: Realizing Property Rights, 2006. ISBN 978-3-907625-25-5
- Smith, Barry et al. (eds.). The Mystery of Capital and the Construction of Social Reality, Chicago: Open Court, 2008. ISBN 0-8126-9615-8

== See also ==
- Contributions to liberal theory
- Crony capitalism
- Dependency theory
- Documentality
- Liberalism
- Mercantilism
- Milton Friedman
- The Other Path: The Economic Answer to Terrorism
