= Abu-Lughod =

Abu-Lughod is a surname. Notable people with the surname include:

- Ibrahim Abu-Lughod (1929–2001), Palestinian-American political scientist
- Janet Abu-Lughod (1928–2013), American sociologist
- Lila Abu-Lughod (born 1952), Palestinian-American anthropology professor
