= Guy T. O. Hollyday =

Guy Hollyday
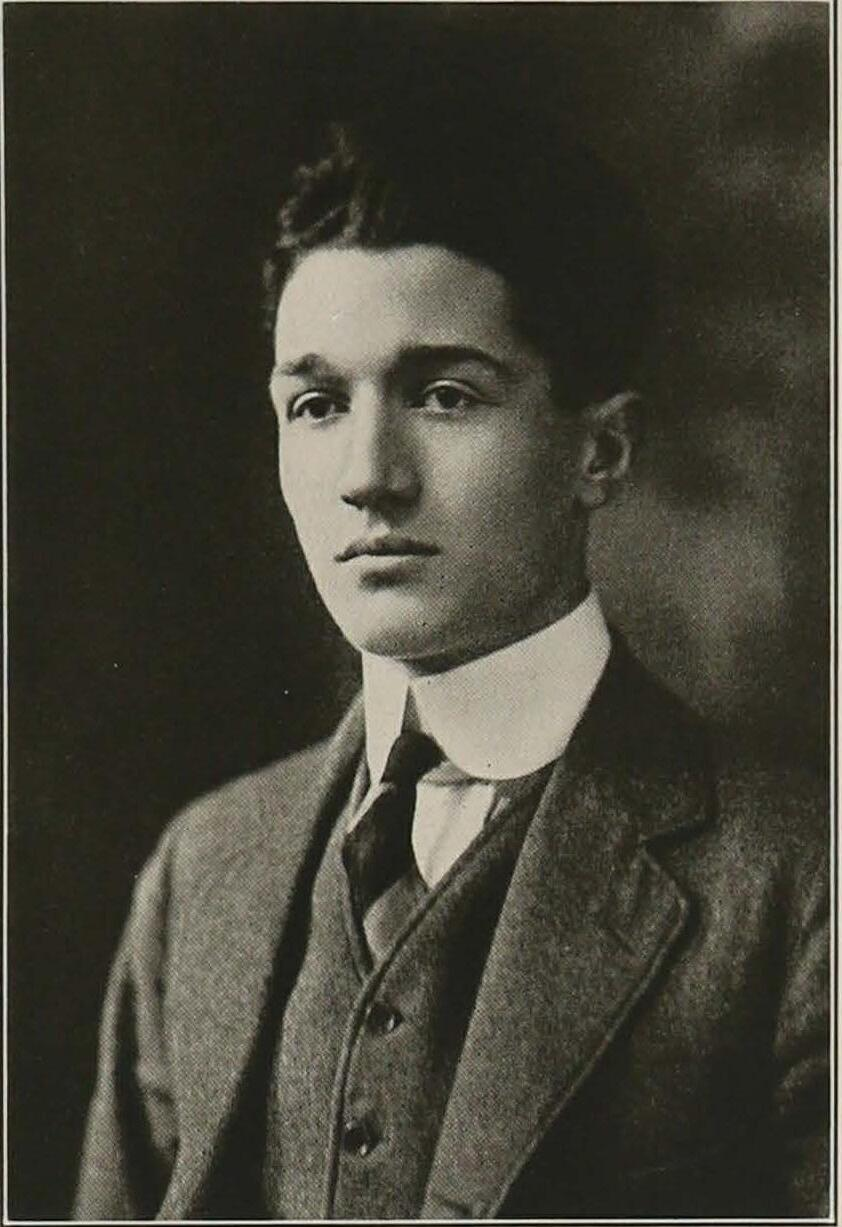
- Born: 1893
- Died: May 31, 1991; Baltimore, Maryland, US
- Education: Johns Hopkins University
- Known for: Commissioner of the Federal Housing Administration
- Spouse: Louise Este Fisher
- Children: 3

Guy Tilghman Orme Hollyday (1893–1991) was an American proponent of urban housing renewal.

Hollyday graduated from Boys' Latin School of Maryland in 1910 and Johns Hopkins University in 1914. Prior to World War I, he served as the assistant secretary of the Maryland League for National Defense, then served in the Maryland National Guard as a cavalry unit officer. He returned from war and married Louise Este Fisher in 1926.

Hollyday started with the Roland Park Company in 1926, leaving in 1932. In 1930, he became the president of the Real Estate Board of Baltimore, followed by the Mortgage Bankers Association of America. During this time he also became chairman of the national title underwriters section of the American Title Association. He also worked as vice president of the Key Realty company from 1932 to 1935.

Hollyday started in the mortgage business with the Washington D.C.–based Randall H. Hagner Co. from 1935 to 1944. In 1936, Hollyday brought in a young future developer, James Rouse, who proposed a FHA mortgage department to back loans in high-risk markets. He would remain a partner in the interest that would become the nationwide mall and land development firm, the Rouse Company. In the last months before WWII, the Citizens Planning and Housing Association was formed by Frances Morton (Froelicher), a Sunday School student of Hollyday.

In 1944, Hollyday became the president of the Title Guarantee and Trust Co. He became the chair of the Baltimore Zoning Committee. He formed Fight Blight Inc. to provide FHA-backed loans to property owners who failed to meet the new codes he initiated under the zoning board. Hollyday became the vice president of American Council to Improve Our Neighborhoods (ACTION) in 1951 which marketed public-private housing initiatives as The Baltimore Plan. Despite limited success, the for-profit public-private initiative was taken up by the Eisenhower administration to reduce federal public housing costs.

Hollyday was appointed to the head of the Federal Housing Administration from 1953 to 1954 during the Eisenhower administration. After a year as FHA head, Hollyday was replaced by Albert M. Cole who charged that Hollyday had lost over $75 million in federal housing dollars to "fleecing" and "viciously sharp practices." Over 251 federal loans were given to construction companies far above the actual construction expense.

In 1958, former ACTION member James Rouse succeeded Hollyday as head of Guarantee Title. In 1960, the Title Guarantee and Trust Co. merged to become the Maryland Title Guarantee Co. Hollyday retired from the firm as Vice CEO. He would also recommend changes to Baltimore's housing code prior to the Baltimore riot of 1968.

Hollyday was a member of many housing industry and banking boards, including the Build America Better Committee of the National Association of Real Estate Boards, chairman of the association's homebuilders and subdividers division, Savings Bank of Baltimore, Loyola Federal Savings and Loan Association, the Hagner Co., the Guilford Realty Co. and James W. Rouse & Co. He was also president of the Fiscal Mortgage Co. and worked for the Roland Park Co., Industrial Bureau of the Board of Trade of Baltimore. He was Vice president of Key Realty Co., to which the James Rouse development Village of Cross Keys was named.

Following his federal government work, friends funded a community center in Washington's Adams Morgan neighborhood and named it after Hollyday.

== See also ==
- Housing Act of 1954
