= Institute for Liberty and Democracy =

Peruvian think tank

- Abbreviation: ILD
- Formation: 1981; 45 years ago
- Founder: Hernando de Soto Polar
- Type: Public policy think tank
- Location: Lima, Peru
- Website: www.ild.org.pe

The Institute for Liberty and Democracy (ILD) is a think tank based in Lima devoted to the promotion of property rights in developing countries. It was established in 1981 by Peruvian economist Hernando de Soto. The ILD works with developing countries to implement property and business rights reforms that provide the legal tools and institutions required for citizens to participate in the formal economy.

== Founding ==
After working as an economist in Europe for the General Agreement on Tariffs and Trade, a precursor to the World Trade Organization, as well as president of the Committee of the Copper Exporting Countries Organization, CEO of Universal Engineering Corporation and a principal for Swiss Bank Corporation, Hernando de Soto returned to Peru in 1979. De Soto returned to Peru at the request of small Peruvian mining companies with gold placer claims, though when he went to the locations that investors were interested in, locals had already began to pan for gold in the area. De Soto then believed he was spending too much of his time grappling with red tape and climbing over regulatory barriers, seeing this as nationwide problem resulting from excessive government regulation and concluding that the share of the Peruvian economy was an informal one.

At the time of de Soto's return, liberal policy was moving from the fringes of economic theory to mainstream practice. De Soto met with Friedrich Hayek, a free market proponent who helped create the Mont Pelerin Society, shortly after his return in 1979. After making connections with Hayek, de Soto was acquainted with Hayek collaborator Sir Antony Fisher, a British businessman who created the Atlas Network, a nonprofit libertarian umbrella group that consolidated funds and research from businesses in the United States and Europe in order to create liberal organizations in developing countries.

With the help of Fisher and the Atlas Network, de Soto created the Institute for Liberty and Democracy (ILD) in 1981, one of the first liberal organizations in Latin America. De Soto would later state "Anthony gave us enormous amounts of information and advice on how to get organized. ... It was on the basis of his vision that we designed the structure of the ILD". In 1984, de Soto received further assistance from the United States president Ronald Reagan's administration, with the National Endowment for Democracy's Center for International Private Enterprise (CIPE) providing it first-ever grant to ILD, including funding and education for advertising campaigns. In 2003, the CIPE would later describe the ILD as being one of its most successful programs. The ILD would then seek popular support in Peru by making informal housing their main concern.

== Peruvian projects ==
=== Initial projects ===
The ILD's research received much publicity and de Soto was contacted by President Fernando Belaúnde Terry who asked him for a plan to reform executive branch legislation, though the project was abandoned due to pressure from Belaúnde's cabinet. When the Shining Path began to gain power during the 1980s, the ILD started a campaign to raise awareness about "the informal sector." In 1984, the ILD sought to establish an ombudsman in Peru to represent public interests. In July 1984 and December 1985, the ILD signed two agreements with the Office of the Attorney General to design the legal mechanisms for Peru's first "Office of the Ombudsman"—El Defensor del Pueblo. In February 1986, the ILD launched the ombudsman project: A special team from the institute set up several offices in Lima to receive and process grievances. During the first month, more than 153 grievances representing 300,000 individuals were received, either in person or by mail. More than half of the complaints were about the difficulties of gaining legal access to housing.

ILD researchers concluded that existing government procedures to allot undeveloped land involved 207 bureaucratic steps that could take upwards of three years to complete, and that gaining a legal property title might take as long as 20 years. The ILD drafted eight more proposals for reform.

In 1986, de Soto, Enrique Ghersi Silva of the Mont Pelerin Society and author Mario Ghibellini published the IDL's first book, The Other Path: The Economic Answer to Terrorism, calling for legal reforms.

=== García administration ===
The ILD became involved with the Peruvian economy at the end of President Alan García's term. The group created a draft of the law and an administrative strategy to streamline bureaucratic procedures and facilitate institutional reform. This proposal was based on public hearings and debates throughout the country, featuring legal specialists and congressmen. In June 1989, the ILD's draft was unanimously approved in Congress by all political parties and, with no major modifications, became Law No. 25035 for Administrative Simplification.

The concept of the new law rested on four pillars:

1. Substituting most ex ante requirements that create legal bottlenecks with ex post controls
2. Keeping the costs of operating legally below those of operating illegally
3. Decentralizing decision-making procedure
4. Promoting user participation to control the application of all decisions

Shortly after the law was enacted, President Alan García called upon the ILD to manage the implementation of the simplification process. The ILD signed an agreement with the Government in July 1989. The ILD proceeded to design a unique mechanism called "The Administrative Simplification Tribunal" to gather and evaluate proposals from citizens for deregulation and to check up on how various bureaucracies were responding to the dictates of the law. To facilitate public participation, bright yellow boxes were placed in the ILD headquarters, in several government offices as well as at all the radio, television, and newspaper outlets to make it as convenient as possible for people to deposit their grievances. The complaints were dealt with in a publicly televised tribunal managed by the ILD and presided over by the President of the Republic every second Saturday morning.

=== Fujimori administration ===
==== Property rights ====
The ILD would then seek popular support in Peru by making informal housing their main concern. By 1987, ILD's research had determined that the value of real estate assets that were not duly titled or could not be leveraged to generate capital was in the neighborhood of US $70 billion. Such "extralegal" homes could not be used in the legal market to obtain credit or produce surplus value. Therefore, for their owners, this enormous investment was "dead capital."

The ILD then drafted the "Property Registry Law", presenting it to the Peruvian parliament in 1988. Simultaneously, the ILD was conducting a national campaign to create public awareness of the issue and the advantages of integrating such a huge amount of extralegal property into the legal system, which reached its pitch when Peruvian pollsters confirmed that 80 to 90 percent of the population supported "formalization" of the poor's real estate assets. The ILD advertised to the Peruvian public promoting their legislative goals with advertisements similar to American lottery ads, asking viewers "What would you do if you had capital?". The Peruvian parliament unanimously enacted the ILD's draft into law (Ley del Registro Predial) in November 1988.

Between 1992 and 1994, the ILD piloted a land title program to formally register 200,000 Peruvian households and two years later, expanded the program to Lima and seven other metropolitan areas that held ninety percent of informal housing developments within Peru. To assure that extralegal property was titled and recorded, the ILD helped to create a new organization, Registro Predial, and then proceeded to run it on behalf of the Government from 1990 until 1996. In 1995, the World Bank and President Alberto Fujimori requested a new project from the ILD to extend formalization further. The ILD came up with a draft that became Decree Law No. 803 in March 1996, creating the Commission for the Formalization of Informal Property (COFOPRI) as well as the start-up programs and the strategy for that organization. Once the law was enacted, the government assumed direct control of the land title program and hired existing and former ILD personnel to manage it. The World Bank would provide further loans for the program in 1998 to finalize the project.

The program concluded in 2004 with 1.4 million households being registered and 920,000 land titles being provided. Contrary to de Soto's claims, the land title project provided no change to the access of credit to poor Peruvians. The ILD's figures reported that homeowners also saw their hours at work increase by seventeen percent, while working at home decreased by forty-seven percent and child labor was reduced by twenty-eight percent, with the group stating that the latter two statistics were due to homeowners and their children no longer being required to defend their homes from seizure. According to Timothy Mitchell, the ILD's findings were "implausible" since the conclusion was already framed by the ILD, neighborhoods were already collective with limited property conflicts and those included in the project were already pursuing work outside of their homes when they chose to become involved. Following the findings, the ILD would distance itself from advocating credit access and instead promoted the findings of increased work hours among formal landowners.

==== The Unified Business Registry ====
During his 1990 campaign for the presidency, Fujimori used ILD research to make a major issue of the obstacles that small enterprises were facing in Peru. In September 1990, one month after Fujimori's inauguration, the ILD presented the new president with a draft law aimed at reducing radically the time required to obtain a license to operate a business legally. In September 1990, the president enacted Supreme Decree No. 118-90-PCM establishing the Unified Business Registry.

==== Legal system ====
In February 1992, the ILD proposed to the Peruvian public and government a draft of a new law that would allow all parties in conflict the option of an arbitration procedure that would solve their problems in a quick, inexpensive, fair and predictable way. Although the ILD draft was not accepted, its provisions were included in General Arbitration Law No. 25935 in December of the same year. In addition, the agency in charge of formalizing property, COFOPRI, which was created in 1996, adopted the rules for resolving informal property border and ownership disputes from the ILD proposal and incorporated them into COFOPRI's regulations.

The ILD proposed to President Fujimori a plan for the pardon of untried prisoners. Supreme Decree 017-90-JUS approved this pardon in September 1990. A total of 4,000 prisoners—30% of the prisoners behind bars without trial—were set free. The pardon, however, did not apply to such offenses as drug trafficking, terrorism, child molestation or homicide. The Penal Procedure Code incorporated the fundamental principles of the ILD's proposal. Currently, there is a special Civil Committee that evaluates the prison population—based on precedents that were set by the ILD—and recommends to the president the release of unjustly jailed or untried prisoners.

=== International projects ===
After losing support in Peru, the ILD began to pursue economic projects internationally. The ILD has worked directly in more than 25 emerging market countries and has been consulted by 35 heads of state, leading a range of high-impact projects such as managing property formalization in Peru, implementing land titling in El Salvador, and helping streamline the legal frameworks governing property and business rights in Tanzania and Egypt.
