= Dead capital =

Economic term

Dead capital is an economic term related to property which is informally held, is not legally recognized, and cannot be exchanged for financial capital. The uncertainty of ownership decreases the value of the asset and/or the ability to lend or borrow against it. These lost forms of value are dead capital.

The term dead capital was coined by Peruvian Economist Hernando de Soto. De Soto estimated in 2015 that 5.3 billion of 7.3 billion people globally – over seventy percent of the world's population – hold dead capital that is worth US$ 9.3 trillion in assets. This dead capital owned by poor or middle-class people in emerging economies cannot be realized due to poor policies, ineffective procedures, or bureaucracy. If these assets in the informal sector were recognized and brought into the mainstream market economy, they could possibly become the key to fostering development.

== Theorized economic impact ==
According to De Soto, only well-connected people have the ability to use their capital and join it together with other assets and create surplus value for further investment. Only these people can get life, educational, medical or property and casualty insurance and thus shield themselves from any problems. Only they can obtain unsecured loans (or even secured loans) after providing proper evidence of their property claims. The legal morass that complicates the property system disables them from being connected to the world. This then leaves a massive shadow economy which although very wealthy, does not fully contribute to the economy and does not help its participants fully achieve their potential.

De Soto argued that those living in poverty should be provided titles to the land, homes and businesses they live, recognized as dead capital without being legally registered, which would bring vitality to the assets and grant poor individuals the opportunity to build wealth and generate income. He also believed that instability surrounding property rights was a leading reason for conflict internationally.

== Reception ==
World Bank Country Manager for Serbia Loup Brefort advocated for the idea of dead capital to promote real estate assets among Serbians. PricewaterhouseCoopers also recommended utilizing real estate in Nigeria to obtain assets, estimating that there existed $300–900 billion of potential residential property in the country as dead capital. In the South Carolina Lowcountry, the United States Forest Service visited the concept of dead capital while attempting to manage heir property – land owned by two or more people that usually have a common ancestor who died without leaving a will – in the region.

One main argument against dead capital is that bestowing assets on poor individuals for the intention of lending makes them vulnerable to predatory lending. According to former United Nations Special Rapporteur on the Right to Housing Raquel Rolnik, "Formal titles are more important for financial expansion than for the rights of people", stating that "good housing policy is diversified and can mobilize different tenure arrangements, not only private property". She cited de Soto's policies that were enacted in Peru, saying that poor individuals who received land titles did not take out loans on their property.

Some scholars including Daniel W. Bromley, Tor A. Benjaminsen, Stein Holden, Christian Lund, Espen Sjaastad, Ruth Meinzen-Dick and Esther Mwangi believe that de Soto's ideas cannot be utilized in countries that are not part of the Western world. Entities competing for the ownership of dead capital also raised concerns, especially when regulators administering titles preferred one entity over another out of self-interest. Other critics also argue that the wealthy have already amassed so much of the resources and land on Earth that it does not deter them from taking advantage of those given titles.

== Groups working with a dead capital theoretical framework ==
- Institute for Liberty and Democracy
- Center for Live Capital
- Free Market Foundation of South Africa
