= Ghinnawa =

Bedouin lyric poems

Ghinnawas (literally "little songs") are short, two line emotional lyric poems written by the Bedouins of Egypt, in a fashion similar to haiku, but similar in content to the American blues. Ghinnawas typically talk of deep, personal feelings and are often an outlet for personal emotions which might not be otherwise expressible in Bedouin society. Ghinnawas may also be sung. Lila Abu-Lughod, the Palestinian American anthropologist who studied the Awlad Ali Bedouins in Lower Egypt in the late 1970s and collected over 450 ghinnawas, has published the most comprehensive work on ghinnawas to date.

Ghinnawa is a form of folk poetry, in the sense that anyone in Awlad Ali society could author a ghinnawa. In a broader context, the ghinnawa may be looked upon as non-standard discourse that is a means of coping with social reality, similar to other discourse forms in the Arab world like the hikaya folktales of Tunisia or the gussa allegories of the Bedouin of the Sinai Peninsula.

== Themes ==
Ghinnawas usually have sad themes - typically being the lament of lost love, unless sung at celebrations like a circumcision or a wedding. Ghinnawas are sung by women, boys and also on rare occasions by men. Ghinnawa semantics are well-defined only in context, because of their personal nature. Contents of ghinnawas are considered personal, even sensitive to the extent that Lila Abu Lughod was warned "never to reveal any women's poems to men".

== Social expression ==
The Awlad Ali do not have a strong history of public displays of emotion. Modesty or deference and boasting or anger are typically the most commonly expressed public emotion. Most other forms of expression take place through ghinnawas.

== Delivery and structure ==
Ghinnawas may be written down, which is often the case for intergender communication, but can be spoken as substitute to normal conversation, or sung. The structure of the ghinnawa is very different in written and oral forms.

Structurally, ghinnawas are approximately 15-syllable couplets. They can be broken up into 2 hemistiches. If the written form be represented as :

1234
56789

the oral form unspools into 16 lines as follows:

78
78
789
78
6789
78
78
6789
78
78
781
1234
78
78
56
56789

Each ghinnawa typically has many variations, and may even be sung with minor variations in a single singing.
