= Multilingual titling =

The term multilingual titling defines, in the field of titling for the performing arts (musical theatre, drama, audiovisual productions), the chance for the audience to follow more than one linguistic option.

== History ==
In the audiovisual field, multilingual titling was made possible by the introduction of DVD (1996) in which an integrated data-base gives access to several language channels dedicated to titling.
In the live performing arts, multilingual options (with the possibility of individual choice) were introduced in 1998 at Santa Fe Opera by means of custom individual displays set mainly on the back of the seats, as in airplanes.
The introduction, at the end of the 1900s, of Web 2.0 and of the new mobile device technologies caused deep changes also in this field.
In Europe, in 2011, a significant innovation was provided by the Maggio Musicale Fiorentino Theatre in Florence, which started the testing of a new multilingual transmission system for mobile consumer devices, that can be integrated into monolingual surtitles.
In the same year, another multilingual software for mobile consumer devices was developed, as an alternative to the use of subtitles in cinemas and, the following year (2012), a new head-mounted display system (multimedia glasses) was introduced, serving the same function.
In 2011–2012, the Royal Opera House Muscat carried out the most advanced multilingual custom display system to date, interactive and integrated with surtitles screened on a central LED panel.

== Other solutions ==
The simultaneous presentation of two languages is quite unusual within the more traditional surtitling system, which is used in most cases with monolingual function.

== Sources ==
- BARDI A., Parola cantata o recitata e parola scritta. Pensieri per i primi dieci anni di Prescott Studio, in Prescott Studio. 1996-2006: Catalogo delle produzioni. Dieci anni di sopratitoli in Italia e in Europa, pp. 11–13, Firenze-Scandicci, 2007
- BESTENTE S., Buon compleanno, sopratitoli, 16 July 2008, in http://www.fierrabras.com/2008/07/16/buon-compleanno-sopratitoli/
- COLOMBO S., ed., «Come si dice Wagner in italiano?» Rassegna stampa del debutto dei sopratitoli in Europa, in Prescott Studio. 1996-2006: Catalogo delle produzioni. Dieci anni di sopratitoli in Italia e in Europa, pp. 29–36, Firenze-Scandicci, 2007
- CONTI M., Leggere voci. Il muto racconto dei sopratitoli, voce fuori campo del teatro, in Prescott Studio. 1996-2006: Catalogo delle produzioni. Dieci anni di sopratitoli in Italia e in Europa, pp. 15–24, Firenze-Scandicci, 2007
- EUGENI C., Il Teatro d'opera e l'adattamento linguistico simultaneo, M.A. Thesis, Scuola Superiore di Lingue Moderne per Interpreti e Traduttori, University of Bologna, academic year 2002-2003
- FOURNIER-FACIO G., Io c'ero. La prima volta dei sopratitoli in Italia, in Prescott Studio. 1996-2006: Catalogo delle produzioni. Dieci anni di sopratitoli in Italia e in Europa, p. 37, Firenze-Scandicci, 2007
- FREDDI M. and LURAGHI S., Titling for the Opera House: a Test Case for Universals of Translations? in INCALCATERRA McLOUGHLIN L., BISCIO M. and NÍ MHAINNÍN, M. Á., eds., Audiovisual Translation. Subtitles and Subtitling: Theory and Practice, Bern-Berlin-New York: Peter Lang, 2010. See also the extensive Bibliography (in Appendix)
- GAMBIER Y., Les transferts linguistiques dans les médias, Lilles: Presses Universitaires du Septentrion, 1996
- GOTTLIEB H., Subtitling. A new University Discipline, in DOLLERUP C. e LODDEGAARD A., Eds., Teaching Translation and Interpreting, 1. Training, Talent and Experience, Amsterdam-Philadelphia: John Benjamins, 1992
- HEISS C. e BOLLETTIERI BOSINELLI R. M., Traduzione multimediale per il cinema, la televisione e la scena, Bologna: Clueb, 1996
- HUGHES P.J., The introduction of supertitles to opera, M.A. Thesis, Teachers College, Columbia University: New York 2003
- MARSCHALL G.R., La traduction des livrets. Aspects théoriques, historiques et pragmatiques. Actes du colloque international tenu en Sorbonne les 30 novembre, 1er et 2 décembre 200, sous la direction de Gottfried R. Marschall, Paris: Presses de l’Université Paris-Sorbonne, 2004
- LURAGHI S., Sottotitoli per l'opera: strategie di semplificazione in un tipo speciale di traduzione, in «Studi italiani di linguistica teorica e applicata», 33 (1), Pisa: Pacini Editore, 2004
- PAPARELLA S., I sopratitoli: metodi di traduzione e adattamento del testo, B.A. Thesis, Facoltà di Lettere e Filosofia, University of Pisa, advisor Mireille Gille, academic year 2003-2004
- PEREGO E., Evidence of explication in subtitling: toward a categorisation, in «Across language and cultures», 4 (1), pp. 63–88, 2003
- PEREGO E., La traduzione audiovisiva, Roma: Carocci, 2005. See also the extensive Bibliography (in Appendix), pp. 121–126
- RACAMIER, M., Une vision d'ensemble du surtitrage d'opéra: vers la reconnaissance d'une nouvelle pratique de traduction?, Université de Toulouse II Le Mirail - University of Genua, Mémoire de deuxième année de Master Professionnel en Traduction et Interprétation «Proscenio»: Traduction technique, multimédia et arts de la scène, headmaster Margherita Orsino, co-headmaster Micaela Rossi, academic year 2011-2012
- ROCCATAGLIATI A. and SALA E., Tradurre l'opera? Basta capirsi..., in «Il giornale della musica», No. 188, December 2002
- SABLICH S., Wagner con le didascalie, Program notes, Die Meistersinger von Nürnberg, European début of surtitles, Florence, Teatro Comunale, 1 June 1986
- SABLICH S., Tradurre all'epoca dei sopratitoli, in «Il giornale della musica», No. 188, December 2002
- SESTITO M., Costumi di scena del tradurre, in Prescott Studio. 1996-2006: Catalogo delle produzioni. Dieci anni di sopratitoli in Italia e in Europa, pp. 25–27, Firenze-Scandicci, 2007
- STAMPACCHIA E., Traduzione e sopratitolaggio. Il caso dell'opera lirica, M. A. Thesis, Facoltà di Lettere e Filosofia, University of Pavia, Silvia Luraghi advisor, academic year 2003-2004
