= Timothy Mitchell =

Political theorist and professor of Middle Eastern Studies at Columbia University

- Occupations: Political theorist, historian, author
- Spouse: Lila Abu-Lughod
- Relatives: Ibrahim Abu-Lughod (father-in-law); Janet L. Abu-Lughod (mother-in-law)

Academic background
- Education: Queens' College, Cambridge (BA, 1977; MA, 1981); Princeton University (MA, 1979; PhD, 1984)
- Thesis: As if the World Were Divided in Two: The Birth of Politics in Turn-of-the-Century Cairo (1984)

Academic work
- Institutions: New York University; Columbia University
- Main interests: Colonialism • Political economy • Politics of energy • Making of expert knowledge
- Notable works: Colonising Egypt; Questions of Modernity; Rule of Experts: Egypt, Techno-Politics, Modernity; Carbon Democracy
- Website: http://blogs.cuit.columbia.edu/tm2421/

Timothy P. Mitchell is a British-born political theorist and student of the Arab world. He is a professor of Middle Eastern Studies at Columbia University. He was previously Professor of Politics at New York University.

== Career ==
Mitchell attended The John Fisher School in Croydon, and read history at Queens' College, Cambridge. He received his B.A. in the subject from Cambridge in 1977, after which he began his doctoral studies in Politics at Princeton University, whence he received a Ph.D. in 1984. Upon arrival he was "surprised to discover that the Politics Department at Princeton was teaching the same old positivism. I was interested in the politics of the Arab world, having traveled there several times, so I evaded political science by taking courses in Middle Eastern history and Arabic language and spent three of the next six years studying and researching in Cairo. Meanwhile, Discipline and Punish had just appeared in English and Orientalism came out a year later. I read these against the Marx I had studied as an undergraduate, and moved on to Derrida and Heidegger, all of which informed the book I eventually produced, Colonising Egypt."

Mitchell is known for his expansive research into modern Egypt's economy and for his different contributions to postcolonial theory. Jeffrey Azarva has called Mitchell's book Colonising Egypt a staple of university syllabi. Mitchell's book rests on the theory that the roots of colonialism are as much internal as external, and that power operates through representation and culture as well as brute force. Nineteenth century reforms and modernisation, Mitchell asserts, were backdoor attempts to subjugate Egypt to British influence. Urban planning and other attempts to control the basic elements of daily life enabled subjugation.

Mitchell responded to 9/11 with a critique of American support for autocracy in the Muslim world and for Israel, asserting that "Washington continues to side with the exclusionary politics and expansionist militarism of the Israeli government. Most Palestinians endure this American-funded violence and collective imprisonment with a quite extraordinary forbearance and fortitude. But the resources for collective resistance are very few, the rule of the Palestinian authority is increasingly inept and corrupt, and for some the politics of despair and a reactive violence are never far away."

== Political activity ==
Mitchell is a supporter of the academic boycott of Israel.

Mitchell also signed a petition "La démocratie en Iran, pas la guerre. Trois cents intellectuels appellent l'ONU à faire pression pour les droits de l'homme sans se focaliser sur le nucléaire", a letter advocating democracy in Iran and discouraging militarism, a letter supporting the right of NYU graduate teaching assistants to make their own decisions on unionization, and many other political open letters signed by academics.

== Personal life ==
Mitchell is married to Lila Abu-Lughod, a Columbia University anthropology and gender studies professor, who herself is the daughter of Palestinian academic Ibrahim Abu-Lughod and of American urban sociologist Janet L. Abu-Lughod.

== Books ==
- The Alibi of Capital: How We Broke the Earth to Steal the Future on the Promise of a Better Tomorrow, Verso, 2026.
- Carbon Democracy: Political Power in the Age of Oil, Verso, 2011.
- Rule of Experts: Egypt, Techno-Politics, Modernity University of California Press, 2002.
- Questions of Modernity, University of Minnesota Press, 2000 (editor and contributor).
- Colonising Egypt, University of California Press, 1991.
