= Lila Abu-Lughod =

American anthropologist

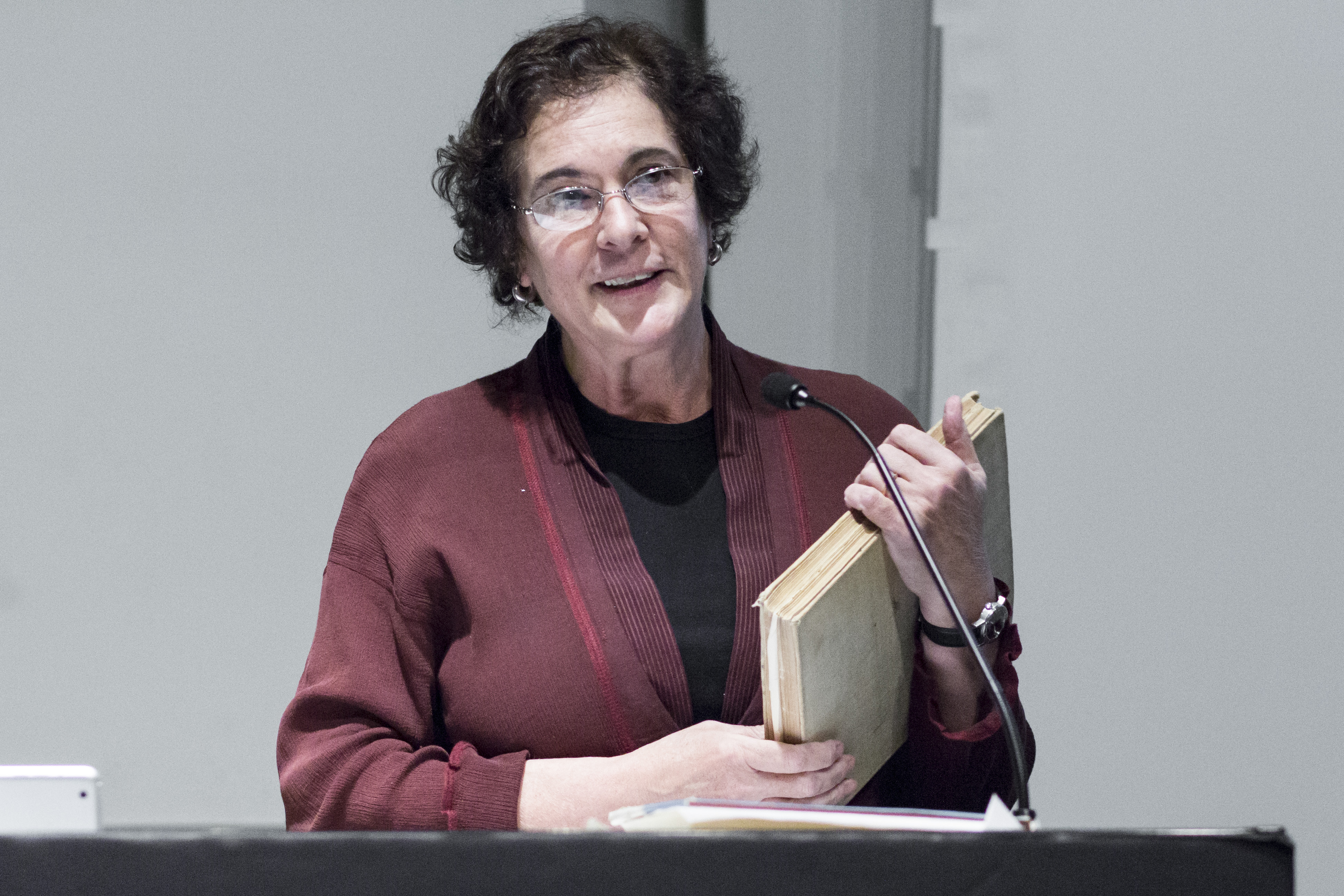
- Born: October 21, 1952 (age 74); Champaign, Illinois, U.S.
- Spouse: Timothy Mitchell
- Parent(s): Ibrahim Abu-Lughod (father); Janet L. Abu-Lughod (mother)

Academic background
- Education: Carleton College (BA); Harvard University (MA, PhD)

Academic work
- Discipline: Anthropology
- Institutions: Williams College; Princeton University; New York University; Columbia University
- Website: http://www.columbia.edu/cu/anthropology/fac-bios/abu-lughod/faculty.html

Lila Abu-Lughod (Arabic: ليلى أبو لغد; born 1952) is an American anthropologist. She is the Joseph L. Buttenweiser Professor of Social Science at Columbia University. She specializes in ethnographic research in the Arab world, and her seven books cover topics including sentiment and poetry, nationalism and media, gender politics and the politics of memory.

== Early life and education ==
Lila Abu-Lughod was born on October 21, 1952, in Champaign, Illinois, where her father, Ibrahim Abu-Lughod, graduated from the University of Illinois. Ibrahim Abu-Lughod was a prominent Palestinian academic well-known for his academic work and activism for Palestine. Her mother, Janet Abu-Lughod (née Lippman), was a leading Jewish American urban sociologist.

Abu-Lughod went to New Trier High School and graduated in 1970. She went on to study at Carleton College in 1974, graduating with distinction in social anthropology. She obtained her M.A. in 1978 and her Ph.D. in social anthropology in 1984, both from Harvard University.

== Career ==
=== Research interests ===
Abu-Lughod's body of work is grounded in long-term ethnographic research in Egypt. Her interest in Egypt came from spending several years of her childhood in Egypt. She is especially concerned with the intersections of culture and power, as well as gender and women's rights in the Middle East. Her research interests and work include urbanism, technology, memory, museum archives, displacement, states, sovereignty, critical theory and genealogy.

=== Graduate and postgraduate work ===
Between the late 1970s and the mid-1980s, while still a graduate student, Abu-Lughod spent time living with the Bedouin Awlad 'Ali tribe in Egypt. She stayed with the head of the community, and lived in his household alongside his large family for a cumulative two years. Her first two books, Veiled Sentiments: Honor and Poetry in a Bedouin Society and Writing Women's Worlds, are based on this fieldwork. Both books draw on her experiences living with the Bedouin women and her research into their poetry and storytelling. She explores the way that ghinnawas, songs in a poetic form that she compares to haiku and the blues, express the cultural "patterning" of the society, especially with regard to the relations between women and men. Abu-Lughod has described a reading group that she attended while teaching at Williams College – its other members included Catharine A. MacKinnon, Adrienne Rich, and Wendy Brown – as a formative engagement with the field of women's studies and a major influence on these early books.

=== Academic roles and appointments ===
Lila Abu-Lughod undertook multiple academic roles and appointments. At Columbia University, between 2000 until today she served as professor of anthropology and women's studies, director, Institute for Research on Women and Gender, William B. Ransford Professor of Anthropology and Gender Studies, co-director, Center for the Critical Analysis of Social Difference, director, Middle East Institute, and finally, Joseph L. Buttenwieser Professor of Social Science.

Between 1995 and 2000, at New York University, she was the co-director, Program to Internationalize Women's Studies, associate professor of anthropology and professor of anthropology and Middle East studies.

In 1990, Abu-Lughod served as the assistant professor of religion and associated faculty for the Department of Anthropology at Princeton University. She started her teaching career at Williams College as an assistant professor, for the Department of Anthropology and Sociology.

Abu-Lughod spent time as a scholar at the Institute for Advanced Study, with Judith Butler, Evelyn Fox Keller, and Donna Haraway. She also taught at New York University, where she worked on a project, funded by a Ford Foundation grant, intended to promote a more international focus in women's studies.

Abu-Lughod serves on the advisory boards of multiple academic journals, including Signs: Journal of Women in Culture and Society and Diaspora: A Journal of Transnational Studies.

== Ideas, contributions and influences ==
=== Gender and Feminism in the Muslim World ===
Abu-Lughod's work has contributed in various ways to the thought and knowledge produced around gender studies. In an interview with Columbia Center for Oral History, at Columbia University (2015) for the Institute for Research on Women, Gender and Sexuality Oral History Project, talked about how during her time at Harvard, there was no gender studies program being something that she had missed. During her appointment at NYU she worked along with her colleagues to bring international scholars working on gender. Since then Abu- Lughod was very active in working on organising conferences and events that discuss gender and sexuality issues. Her eagerness on growing debates on the same topic extended to Columbia University when she joined in Y2000.

Her 2013 book, Do Muslim Women Need Saving? investigates the image of Muslim women in Western society. It is based on her 2002 article of the same name, published in American Anthropologist. The text examines post-9/11 discussions on the Middle East, Islam, women's rights, and media. Abu-Lughod gathers examples of the Western narrative of the "abused" Muslim women who need to be saved. Abu-Lughod further explains how the narrative of saving Muslim women has been used as a way to justify military interventions in Muslim countries. She deftly questions the motives of feminists who feel that Muslim women should be saved from the Taliban even while injustices occur in their own countries. She argues that Muslim women, like women of other faiths and backgrounds, need to be viewed within their own historical, social, and ideological contexts. Abu-Lughod's book argues against grouping Muslim women under one umbrella or set of characteristics. In an interview with Mariam Syed for Columbia's Journal, Abu Lughod explains the history of resistance by Muslim women from Palestine, Egypt, Sudan, Iran through scholarly writing.

Abu-Lughod's article and subsequent book on the topic have been compared to Edward Said's Orientalism. Do Muslim Women Need Saving? (2013) has been translated to French, Turkish, Arabic and Japanese.

In her latest co-edited book, with Shenila Khoja-Moolji, Karen Engle, Janet R. Jakobsen, Vasuki Nesiah, and Rafia Zakaria The Cunning of Gender Violence: Securitisation and the Violence of Law, examines the problematic of framing gender violence, based on a global view of Muslim women. She argues that generalising gender violence, as well as codifying it in institutions and NGO's would dismiss the specificity of how each culture and community would consider violence to be. With experts from the Middle East and South East Asia, on gender and feminist pressing questions, Lila Abu-Lughod argues that legal frameworks and humanitarian bodies correlated violence with Muslims. She coined the term "securofeminists" to refer to a group of feminists who in trying to achieve feminists goals using security measures, a practice that Abu-Lughod has expressed to be worrying.

=== Contributions to museum studies and exhibitions ===
In 2023, Lila Abu-Lughod has contributed to the world of Museums and exhibitions, by working closely with the National Museum of Qatar on an exhibition titled On the Move. The exhibition celebrates the lives of three different pastoralist communities: Qatar, Mongolia and Central Sahara. Having done extensive celebrated work on Bedouin communities in Egypt, in this exhibition Abu-Lughod work with a group of anthropologists and with museum specialists, in rethinking questions of representations, collection of objects and other forms of knowledge production other than writing.

The exhibition was in collaboration with the Mongolian National Museum and the National Art Museum.

=== Activism and view on Palestinian-Israeli Conflict ===
Abu-Lughod is a supporter of the Boycott, Divestment and Sanctions movement. Lila Abu-Lughod wrote an article for Anthropology News, which was reposted in March 2016 by Anthroboycott, about her stance on the Israeli–Palestinian conflict, where she responds and contributes to the call for academics and researchers to boycott Israeli academic institutions. In this article, Abu-Lughod refers to the discrimination and indignities faced by various academics, including Noam Chomsky, as a result of their heritage and academic work.

In an interview with Mariam Syed published in the Columbia Journal (2024), Lila Abu-Lughod talked about the role of women in speaking up about the different forms of violence, and particularly sexual violence that Palestinians face daily, which have in the Gaza war. She referenced the work of Nadera Shalhoub-Kevorkian, Karen Engle, Rema Hammami, and Saba Mahmood, who had all contributed to and pointed to sexual violence against women in times of war and conflicts.

== Awards and honors ==
- 1974: Phi Beta Kappa, Carleton College.
- 1984: Malcom Kerr Dissertation Prize in the Social Sciences, Middle East Studies Association of North America.
- 1984: Stirling Award for Contributions to Psychological Anthropology, Society for Psychological Anthropology and the American Anthropological Association.
- 1987: Chicago Folklore Prize.
- 1998: Silver Medal for Outstanding Contributions to the Development of Anthropological and Ethnological Science through Publication, International Union of Anthropological and Ethnological Sciences.
- 1994: Victor Turner Prize, Society for Humanistic Anthropology, American Anthropological Association.
- 1999: Alumni Award for Distinguished Achievement, Carleton College.
- 2006: Honorary Doctorate of Humane Letters, Carleton College, Minnesota.
- 2007: Outstanding Senior Scholar Award, Middle East Section, American Anthropological Association.
- 2007: American Ethnological Society Senior Book Prize.
- 2008: Lenfest Distinguished Faculty Award, Columbia University.
- 2021: Exemplary Cross Field Scholarship Award, General Anthropology Division, American Anthropological Association.
- 2022: Visitor, Institute for Advanced Study, Princeton (2022-2023)
- 2023: Career Award from the Association of Feminist Anthropology, American Anthropological Association.
- 2023: Elected to the American Academy of Arts and Sciences.
- Significant Books and Publications

== Books and publications ==
- The Cunning of Gender Violence. ISBN 978-1-4780-2043-1 (Duke University Press, 2023)
- On the Move: Reframing Nomadic Pastoralism. ISBN 9789927108778 (Qatar Museums Publications, 2022)
- Do Muslim Women Need Saving? (Harvard University Press, 2013) ISBN 978-0-674-72516-4
- Nakba: Palestine, 1948, and the Claims of Memory with Ahmad H. Sa'di, (Columbia University Press, 2007) ISBN 978-0-231-13578-8
- Local Contexts of Islamism in Popular Media (Amsterdam University Press, 2007) ISBN 978-90-5356-824-8
- Dramas of Nationhood: The Politics of Television in Egypt (University of Chicago Press, 2004) ISBN 978-0-226-00197-5
- Writing Women's Worlds: Bedouin Stories (University of California Press, 1993) ISBN 978-0-520-08304-2
- Remaking Women: Feminism and Modernity in the Middle East (Editor) (Princeton University Press,1998) ISBN 978-0-691-05792-7
- Veiled Sentiments: Honor and Poetry in a Bedouin Society (University of California Press, 2000) ISBN 978-0-520-22473-5
- Media Worlds: Anthropology on New Terrain (Editor) (University of California Press, 2002) ISBN 978-0-520-23231-0
- Remaking Women: Feminism and Modernity in the Middle East. (Princeton University Press, 1998). ISBN 9781400831203
- Language and the Politics of Emotions. co-authored with Catherine A. Lutz. (Cambridge University Press, 1990). ISBN 978-0521388689

== Other important contributions ==
In 2001, Abu-Lughod delivered the Lewis Henry Morgan Lecture at the University of Rochester, considered by many to be the most important annual lecture series in the field of anthropology.

In 2007, she named a Carnegie Scholar in 2007 to research the topic: "Do Muslim Women Have Rights? The Ethics and Politics of Muslim Women's Rights in an International Field." She has held research fellowships from the National Endowment for the Humanities, the Guggenheim Foundation, Fulbright, and the Mellon Foundation, among others.

An article from Veiled Sentiments received the Stirling Award for Contributions to Psychological Anthropology. Writing Women's Worlds received the Victor Turner Award. Carleton College awarded her an honorary doctorate in 2006.

== See also ==
- Postcolonialism
- Subaltern
- Orientalism
- Imagined geographies
