= Enrique Ghersi =

Peruvian politician

Enrique Ghersi (born 1961) is a Peruvian lawyer, professor and free market intellectual.

== Biography ==
=== Early life ===
Enrique Ghersi was born in Lima, Peru in 1961.

=== Career ===
Ghersi was a member of the Peruvian Parliament since the 1990s. He is a professor at the Peruvian University of Applied Sciences and the University of Lima. He has also been a visiting professor at Universidad Francisco Marroquín in Guatemala, an honorary professor of Universidad Laica Vicente Rocafuerte de Guayaquil in Ecuador, and visiting professor at the School Superior of Administration of Companies in Buenos Aires.

He is an adjunct scholar at the Cato Institute. He is also an adjunct fellow and member of the board of advisors of the Center on Global Prosperity at the Independent Institute. He sits as vice president on the board of directors of the Mont Pelerin Society. He serves as president of the Centro de Investigaciones y Estudios Legales in Lima, Peru.

A member of the Madrid Forum alliance, Ghersi joined the group of right-wing and far-right individuals organized by Spanish party Vox.

== Bibliography ==
- The Other Path (with Hernando de Soto Polar)
