= Karen Engle =

American legal scholar

Karen Engle (born 1962) is the Minerva House Drysdale Regents Chair in Law and Founder and Co-director of the Bernard and Audre Rapoport Center for Human Rights and Justice at The University of Texas at Austin School of Law. She is also an affiliated faculty member of Latin American Studies and of Women's and Gender Studies. She teaches courses and specialized seminars in public international law, international human rights law, and legal theory.

Professor Engle writes on the interaction between social movements and law, particularly in the fields of international human rights law, international criminal law, and Latin American law. She is author of numerous scholarly articles and of The Grip of Sexual Violence in Conflict: Feminist Interventions in International Law (Stanford University Press, 2020) as well as The Elusive Promise of Indigenous Development: Rights, Culture, Strategy (Duke University Press, 2010), which received the Best Book Award from the American Political Science Association Section on Human Rights. She is co-editor of Anti-Impunity and the Human Rights Agenda (Cambridge University Press, 2016) and After Identity: A Reader in Law and Culture (Routledge, 1995).

Professor Engle received her J.D. magna cum laude from Harvard Law School and a B.A. with honors from Baylor University. Following law school, she clerked for Judge Jerre S. Williams on the 5th Circuit Court of Appeals, and then served as a post-doctoral Ford Fellow in Public International Law at Harvard Law School. She was Professor of Law at the University of Utah prior to joining the University of Texas in 2002.

Engle received a Bellagio Residency Fellowship from the Rockefeller Foundation in 2009 and an assignment as a Fulbright Senior Specialist in Bogotá in 2010. In 2016–17, she was the Deborah Lunder and Alan Ezekowitz Founders’ Circle Member at the Institute for Advanced Study in Princeton. She has taught at a number of universities around the world and, most recently, was a visiting professor at Harvard Law School in 2018.
