= Janet Abu-Lughod =

American sociologist and historian (1928–2013)

- Born: Janet Lippman; August 3, 1928; Newark, New Jersey
- Died: December 14, 2013 (aged 85); New York City, New York
- Spouse: Ibrahim Abu-Lughod (m. 1951, div. 1991)
- Children: Lila, Mariam, Deena, Jawad

Academic background
- Education: University of Chicago (BA, MA); University of Massachusetts Amherst (PhD)
- Thesis: The Ecology of Cairo, Egypt: A Comparative Study Using Factor Analysis (1966)

Academic work
- School or tradition: Chicago school of urbanism World-systems theory
- Institutions: University of Pennsylvania (1954–1957); American University in Cairo (1958–1960); Smith College; Northwestern University (1967–1987); New School for Social Research (1987–1998)
- Main interests: Global history Urban studies
- Notable works: Before European Hegemony: The World System A.D. 1250–1350 (1991)

Janet Lippman Abu-Lughod (August 3, 1928 – December 14, 2013) was an American sociologist who made major contributions to world-systems theory and urban sociology.

== Biography ==
Raised in Newark, New Jersey, United States, she attended Weequahic High School, where she was influenced by the works of Lewis Mumford about urbanization. Methodologically, she remained a Chicago school urbanist throughout her career.

The 13th century world-system. Map based on Janet Abu-Lughod's work.

Janet Abu-Lughod completed her honors degree and an M.A. in urban planning at the University of Chicago, graduating in 1950. She served as director of research for the American Society of Planning Officials (ASPO) in Chicago from 1950 to 1952. After moving to Princeton, New Jersey with her husband in 1952, she worked as a research associate at the University of Pennsylvania and a consultant for the American Council to Improve Our Neighborhoods between 1954 and 1957. From 1958 to 1960, she taught at the American University in Cairo and assisted the Gamal Abdel Nasser government of the United Arab Republic with census analysis as a contribution to the Cairo Fact Book (1963). Following her return to the United States, she received support from the National Science Foundation and the Harvard Radcliffe Institute for her research. She pursued a PhD in sociology at the University of Massachusetts Amherst from 1963 to 1966, while teaching at Smith College, and completed her dissertation on The Ecology of Cairo, Egypt: A Comparative Study Using Factor Analysis.

In 1967, she joined Northwestern University, where she launched the program in comparative urban studies with support from the United States Department of Education. She was involved in the statistical analysis of the second Moroccan census of 1971. In 1987, she accepted a professorship in sociology and historical studies at the Graduate Faculty of the New School for Social Research, from which she retired as professor emerita in 1998. Upon retirement she held visiting short-term teaching appointments at Bosphorous University in Istanbul and on the International Honors Program at the University of Cairo. She published over a hundred articles and thirteen books dealing with urban sociology, the history and dynamics of the World System, and Middle Eastern cities, including an urban history of Cairo that is still considered one of the classic works on that city: Cairo: 1001 Years of the City Victorious.

In 1976 she was awarded a John Simon Guggenheim Memorial Fellowship for Sociology. Abu-Lughod received over a dozen prestigious national government fellowships and grants to research in the areas of demography, urban sociology, urban planning, economic and social development, world systems, and urbanization in the United States, the Middle East and the Third World.

She was especially well known for her monograph Before European Hegemony: The World System A.D. 1250–1350 wherein she argued that a pre-modern world system extending across Eurasia existed in the 13th century, prior to the formation of the modern world-system identified by Immanuel Wallerstein. Among a variety of factors, Abu-Lughod emphasized the role of Champagne fairs, the Mongol Empire, the Mamluk Sultanate, and the history of the Indian subcontinent in shaping this previous world system. In addition, she argued that the "rise of the West," beginning with the intrusion of armed Portuguese ships into the relatively peaceful trade networks of the Indian Ocean in the 16th century, was not a result of features internal to Europe, but was made possible by a collapse in the previous world system.

Abu-Lughod in her works approaches the social and economic development of global cities with the commitment to seeing and acting on possibilities for constructive social change. The span of her works goes from micro-level studies of territoriality and social change, to the analysis of the diffusion of global cities in the Western and Arab world, to historical studies of medieval cities.

She published several well-received works on American cities including New York, Chicago, Los Angeles: America's Global Cities and Race, Space, and Riots in Chicago, New York, and Los Angeles.

She was a member of the Editorial Board for Journal of World-Systems Research.

== Personal life ==
She was married to Ibrahim Abu-Lughod from 1951 to 1991. They had four children: Lila, Mariam, Deena, and Jawad. Janet's family background is Jewish. She died aged 85 in New York City on December 14, 2013.

== Works ==
- Cairo: 1001 Years of the City Victorious. Princeton University Press. 1971. pp. 284. ISBN 978-0-691-03085-2.
- Rabat, Urban Apartheid in Morocco. Princeton Studies on the Near East. Princeton University Press. 1981. p. 374. ISBN 978-0-691-10098-2.
- Before European Hegemony: The World System A.D. 1250–1350. US: Oxford University Press. 1991. pp. 464. ISBN 978-0-19-506774-3.
- Changing Cities: Urban Sociology. Harpercollins College Div. 1991. p. 441. ISBN 978-0-06-040138-2.
- New York, Chicago, Los Angeles: America's Global Cities. University of Minnesota Press. 2000. p. 580. ISBN 978-0-8166-3336-4.
- Race, Space, and Riots in Chicago, New York, and Los Angeles. US: Oxford University Press. 2007. p. 360. ISBN 978-0-19-532875-2.

== See also ==
- Ayşe Zarakol
- John Darwin (historian)

== Sources ==
- Heathcott, Joseph (2017), "Janet Abu-Lughod", in Regan Koch; Alan Latham (eds.), Key Thinkers on Cities, Thousand Oaks, CA: Sage, pp. 15–20, ISBN 978-1-4739-0774-4
