= Titling =

The word titling, in the performing arts (opera, drama, audiovisual productions), defines the work of linguistic mediation encompassing subtitling and surtitling.

== History ==
Subtitling developed starting from 1917, during the silent film era, whereas surtitling has been used in the live performing arts since 1983 (at the dawning of digital systems).
With the appearance of new information systems, which opened the door to multilingual titling a terminological debate started, too.
In the audiovisual system, even when more than one language was used, subtitles maintained their position unchanged for many years. The newest software technologies for mobile devices, which came out as an alternative to subtitling in cinemas, or the possibilities opened up by head-mounted displays, such as subtitle glasses, have made a revision of the technical terminology necessary also in the field of those performing arts that are reproducible on electronic devices.
Even more so, in the live performing arts, the presence of multilingual options on custom individual devices (Santa Fe Opera, 1998) or on mobile consumer devices (Teatro del Maggio Musicale Fiorentino, 2011) or on hybrid solutions (Royal Opera House Muscat, 2012), makes the spatial connotation of the term "sur-titles" inappropriate.

== Terminology ==
In both cases (performing arts that are reproducible on electronic devices and live performing arts), for a scientific approach the term "titling", broader and all-embracing, is preferable to define the work of linguistic mediation, without specifying whether the visualization is to be above (sur-titles) or below (sub-titles).

== Sources ==
- BARDI A., Parola cantata o recitata e parola scritta. Pensieri per i primi dieci anni di Prescott Studio, in Prescott Studio. 1996-2006: Catalogo delle produzioni. Dieci anni di sopratitoli in Italia e in Europa, pp. 11–13, Firenze-Scandicci, 2007
- BESTENTE S., Buon compleanno, sopratitoli, 16 July 2008, in http://www.fierrabras.com/2008/07/16/buon-compleanno-sopratitoli/
- COLOMBO S., ed., «Come si dice Wagner in italiano?» Rassegna stampa del debutto dei sopratitoli in Europa, in Prescott Studio. 1996-2006: Catalogo delle produzioni. Dieci anni di sopratitoli in Italia e in Europa, pp. 29–36, Firenze-Scandicci, 2007
- CONTI M., Leggere voci. Il muto racconto dei sopratitoli, voce fuori campo del teatro, in Prescott Studio. 1996-2006: Catalogo delle produzioni. Dieci anni di sopratitoli in Italia e in Europa, pp. 15–24, Firenze-Scandicci, 2007
- EUGENI C., Il Teatro d'opera e l'adattamento linguistico simultaneo, M.A. Thesis, Scuola Superiore di Lingue Moderne per Interpreti e Traduttori, University of Bologna, academic year 2002–2003
- FOURNIER-FACIO G., Io c'ero. La prima volta dei sopratitoli in Italia, in Prescott Studio. 1996-2006: Catalogo delle produzioni. Dieci anni di sopratitoli in Italia e in Europa, p. 37, Firenze-Scandicci, 2007
- FREDDI M. and LURAGHI S., Titling for the Opera House: a Test Case for Universals of Translations? in INCALCATERRA McLOUGHLIN L., BISCIO M. and NÍ MHAINNÍN, M. Á., eds., Audiovisual Translation. Subtitles and Subtitling: Theory and Practice, Bern-Berlin-New York: Peter Lang, 2010. See also the extensive Bibliography (in Appendix)
- GAMBIER Y., Les transferts linguistiques dans les médias, Lilles: Presses Universitaires du Septentrion, 1996
- GOTTLIEB H., Subtitling. A new University Discipline, in DOLLERUP C. e LODDEGAARD A., Eds., Teaching Translation and Interpreting, 1. Training, Talent and Experience, Amsterdam-Philadelphia: John Benjamins, 1992
- HEISS C. e BOLLETTIERI BOSINELLI R. M., Traduzione multimediale per il cinema, la televisione e la scena, Bologna: Clueb, 1996
- HUGHES P.J., The introduction of supertitles to opera, M.A. Thesis, Teachers College, Columbia University: New York 2003
- MARSCHALL G.R., La traduction des livrets. Aspects théoriques, historiques et pragmatiques, actes du colloque international tenu en Sorbonne les 30 novembre, 1er et 2 décembre 200, sous la direction de Gottfried R. Marschall, Paris: Presses de l’Université Paris-Sorbonne, 2004
- LURAGHI S., Sottotitoli per l'opera: strategie di semplificazione in un tipo speciale di traduzione, in «Studi italiani di linguistica teorica e applicata», 33 (1), Pisa: Pacini Editore, 2004
- PAPARELLA S., I sopratitoli: metodi di traduzione e adattamento del testo, B.A. Thesis, Facoltà di Lettere e Filosofia, University of Pisa, advisor Mireille Gille, academic year 2003–2004
- PEREGO E., Evidence of explication in subtitling: toward a categorisation, in «Across language and cultures», 4 (1), pp. 63–88, 2003
- PEREGO E., La traduzione audiovisiva, Roma: Carocci, 2005. See also the extensive Bibliography (in Appendix), pp. 121–126
- RACAMIER, M., Une vision d'ensemble du surtitrage d'opéra: vers la reconnaissance d'une nouvelle pratique de traduction?, Université de Toulouse II Le Mirail - University of Genua, Mémoire de deuxième année de Master Professionnel en Traduction et Interprétation «Proscenio»: Traduction technique, multimédia et arts de la scène, headmaster Margherita Orsino, co-headmaster Micaela Rossi, academic year 2011–2012
- ROCCATAGLIATI A. and SALA E., Tradurre l'opera? Basta capirsi..., in «Il giornale della musica», No. 188, December 2002
- SABLICH S., Wagner con le didascalie, Program notes, Die Meistersinger von Nürnberg, European début of surtitles, Florence, Teatro Comunale, 1 June 1986
- SABLICH S., Tradurre all'epoca dei sopratitoli, in «Il giornale della musica», No. 188, December 2002
- SESTITO M., Costumi di scena del tradurre, in Prescott Studio. 1996-2006: Catalogo delle produzioni.Dieci anni di sopratitoli in Italia e in Europa, pp. 25–27, Firenze-Scandicci, 2007
- STAMPACCHIA E., Traduzione e sopratitolaggio. Il caso dell'opera lirica, M. A. Thesis, Facoltà di Lettere e Filosofia, University of Pavia, Silvia Luraghi advisor, academic year 2003–2004
