= Ivan Osorio =

American journalist

- Occupations: Columnist and editor
- Writing career
- Subject: Latin American affairs

Ivan Osorio is the books editor at the Cato Institute and a former senior policy analyst, columnist and editor at the Competitive Enterprise Institute (CEI) in Washington, D.C. He specializes in labor policy and Latin American affairs. Before joining CEI, he wrote articles and policy studies for the Capital Research Center. His work is regularly published in conservative, libertarian, and free-market periodicals such as National Review, Human Events, and the American Spectator.

As a student at the University of Florida, Osorio played guitar in several punk rock bands, including Lethal Yellow, The Jeffersons, and Sick Dick and the Volkswagens. He is Nicaraguan American.
