= The Baltimore Plan =

Urban planning initiative

The Baltimore Plan was an urban planning initiative to remove urban blight.

== History ==
Prior to World War II, Baltimore had little housing codes with segregated services. The most notable early code was the 1910 J. Barry Mahool ordinance No. 610 prohibiting African-Americans from moving onto blocks where whites were the majority, and vice versa. In 1947, Baltimore created a housing court to enforce code laws. In 1949, Baltimore initiated the "Block One" program, which cleared a courtyard of 63 houses of fences and outdoor toilets, replacing the private property with an open paved public play area funded by code violations against building owners. This would evolve to the Baltimore Plan, heavily sponsored by the National Association of Home Builders as a method of revitalizing neighborhoods through private enterprise rather than government housing programs.

In 1941 an independent private group called the Citizens Planning and Housing Association (CPHA) was formed with Morton Hans Froelicher, Frances Morton and mortgage banker James Rouse. Prior to Federal Housing Administration loan insurance, the urban mortgage market was a higher risk secondary market with collateral loss in blighted neighborhoods. In 1950, CPHA campaigned the city government to initiate a pilot program for government backed neighborhood improvement programs. In 1951, Thomas D'Alesandro, Jr. created the Mayor's Advisory Council on Housing Law Enforcement with Rouse as chair, including Guy Hollyday from the Mortgage Bankers Association. The Baltimore Plan was created to remove blight from a 27 block section of East Baltimore. The process was to identify a slum, and hold an inspection by the housing department, sanitation, police, and fire and cite owners for violations. A special housing court would hear cases, and condemn the homes or offer a loan furnished by Hollyday and Rouses's Fight Blight Fund.

The Baltimore Plan was not originated by Rouse, but he became the prime spokesman and advocate for the program. The plan was reviewed by other states housing officials to see if the model would work in their cities. Rouse vowed not to stop until all of Baltimores slums are completely cleaned up.

In 1953, NBC broadcast the Encyclopædia Britannica produced film "The Baltimore Project". The film dramatized the cleanup of slums by fining owners to clean up their properties. The promotions were lauded by the NHMBA facing government building competition, and discounted by Milwaukee mayor Frank Zeidler as a surface treatment in the fight over government housing spending priorities.

By 1953, the plan had rehabilitated 403 buildings in 100 blocks of the 2000 block effort. The 27 block pilot area was audited and fell below American Public Health Association minimum standards of living. Rouse noted that using code violations would take 300 years at the current rate to clean up Baltimore. He petitioned the mayor to give him a centralized inspection and enforcement commission. When the effort was not approved, he left the commission and founded a Maryland State housing program. Rouse founded "Democrats for Eisenhower" in 1952, and was invited to assist Dwight D. Eisenhower to develop the Housing Act of 1954 loosely based on the Baltimore Plan which spawned a series of housing initiatives Rouse would capitalize on with his planned-city development company The Rouse Company.

Commission member Yates Cook left to join the National Association of Homebuilders and Guy Hollyday joined the Federal Housing Administration.

== See also ==
- YouTube video of the Baltimore Plan
- Fight Blight Fund - A Rouse initiated fund to steer mortgage business to preferred lenders and builders.
