= Raquel Rolnik =

Brazilian architect and urban planner (born 1956)

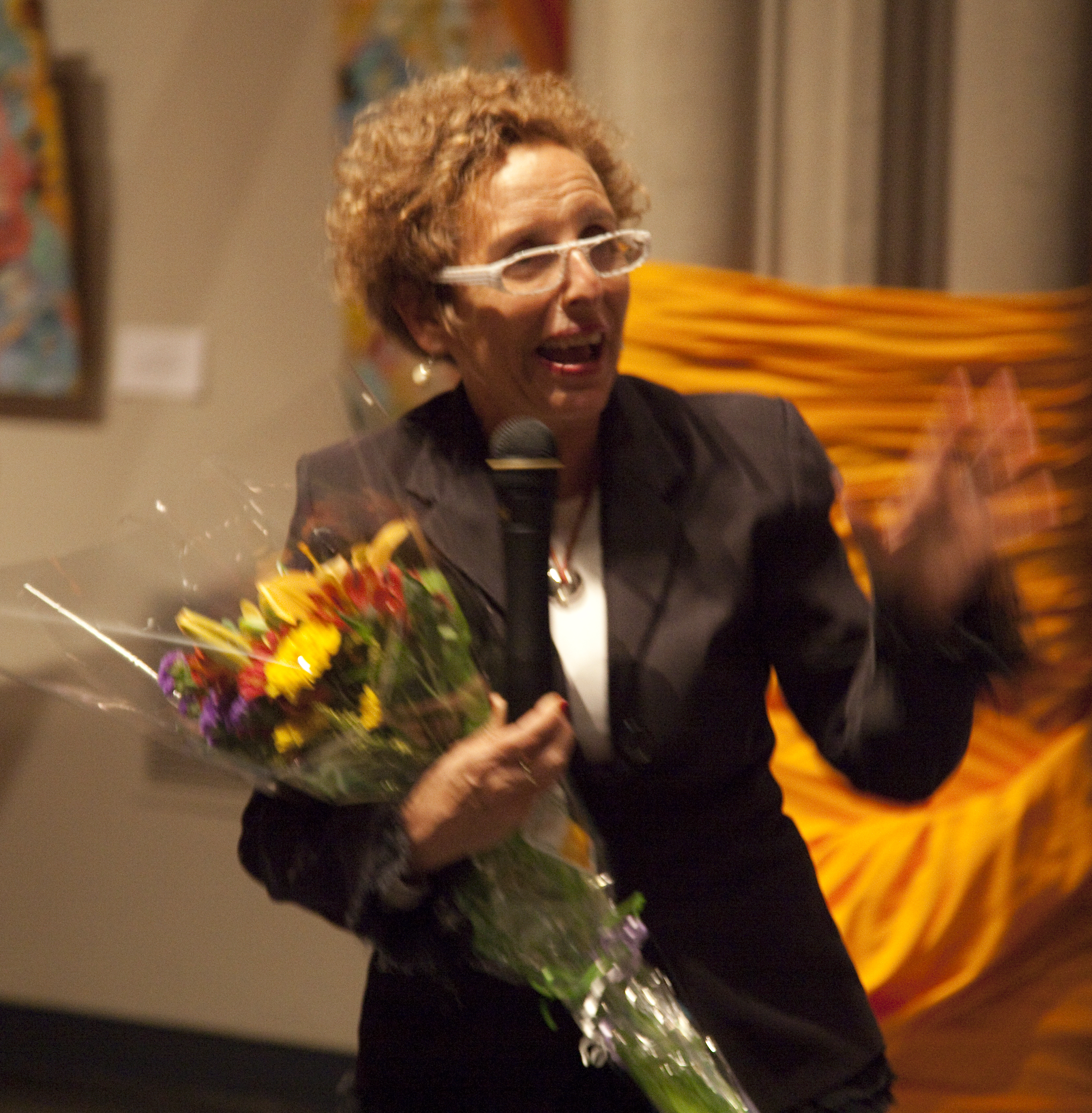
Raquel Rolnik, Campaign to Restore Housing Rights at New York City Town Hall, - March 29, 2011

Raquel Rolnik (born in 1956 in São Paulo) is a Brazilian architect and urban planner.

== Biography ==
She earned her undergraduate degree at the University of São Paulo (USP) in 1978, followed by a Master's degree in Architecture and Urbanism from USP in 1981 and a PhD in History from New York University Graduate School of Arts and Science in 1995. She became a full professor at USP's Architecture and Urbanism College (FAU-USP) in 2015 and is currently head of the Design and Planning Department.

From 1989 to 1992, Rolnik was the Director of Planning for the city of São Paulo during Luiza Erundina's mayoral term. She later served as the Secretary of Urban Programmes at the Ministry of Cities during President Luiz Inácio Lula da Silva's first term from 2003 to 2007. From 2008 to 2014, she was the UN Special Rapporteur on the Right to Adequate Housing.

She is the author of the books "Guerra dos lugares: a colonização da terra e da moradia na era das finanças" (2015), “O que é Cidade” (2004), “São Paulo - Coleção Folha Explica” (2001) and “A Cidade e a Lei - legislação, politica urbana e territórios na cidade de São Paulo” (1997).

She has published numerous articles and commentaries on urban planning, including a column for the Brazilian newspaper Folha de S. Paulo. She also maintains a blog and Facebook page where she regularly writes about urban issues and she hosts a weekly programme on Rádio USP.
