= American Council to Improve Our Neighborhoods =

American Council to Improve Our Neighborhoods (ACTION) is the former name of a non-profit organization focused on housing, revitalization, and neighborhood renewal in the United States.

ACTION was formed in the early 1950s. Downtown development, made possible at the expense of low-income neighborhoods, was becoming a political issue. In November 1954, the White House recommended creating a non-profit publicity and research organization to promote these policies. ACTION was then founded in a 15 November 1954 announcement by Dwight D. Eisenhower at the Mayflower Hotel. It featured prominent land developers on its board of directors including Andrew Heiskell of Time-Life and Richard King Mellon. The program was funded early with a $250,000 grant from the Ford Foundation.

In 1955, ACTION released a 13-minute film promoting urban renewal viewed by 22 million people that year and 60 million by the end of 1958. The same year, former FHA employee and mortgage banker James Rouse became president after promoting the nationally marketed privatized urban renewal project, The Baltimore Plan.

ACTION changed its acronym to "Council for Better Cities". In 1964, ACTION turned toward creation of Community Development Corporations with a $575,000 grant. In 1968, the Ford Foundation granted $690,000 toward non-profit housing projects.

In 1965 ACTION was merged with Urban America, and again with the Urban Collation in 1968. The Urban Collation's mission ironically was started as a group to mitigate effects from urban renewal projects.
