= Ibrahim Abu-Lughod =

Palestinian–American academic (1929–2001)

- Born: February 15, 1929; Jaffa, British Mandate for Palestine
- Died: May 23, 2001 (aged 72); Ramallah, Palestine
- Occupation: Academic

Ibrahim Abu-Lughod (Arabic: إبراهيم أبو لغد, February 15, 1929 – May 23, 2001) was a Palestinian-American academic, characterised by Edward Said as "Palestine's foremost academic and intellectual" and by Rashid Khalidi as one of the first Arab-American scholars to have a really serious effect on the way the Middle East is portrayed in political science and in America". His student Deborah J. Gerner wrote that he "took on the challenge of interpreting U.S. politics and society for the Palestinian community as well as eloquently articulating Palestinian aspirations to the rest of the world."

== Early life ==
Abu-Lughod was born and raised in Jaffa, a port city in what was then British Mandate Palestine. His father was a metal manufacturer. From his student days, he was involved in the Palestinian struggle; he demonstrated against the British and "skirmished" with local Zionist settlers. He completed high school in March 1948, after which he volunteered to work for the National Committee in Jaffa to discourage residents from leaving the city in the face of what Jamal R. Nassar describes as "Zionist assaults." His own family left only weeks later, on April 23 of the same year. Active in the resistance, he remained behind a bit longer, but on May 3, 1948, he left on the Belgian ship, Prince Alexander, "the last" ship out of Jaffa, headed to Beirut.

== Exile ==
From Beirut (and, briefly, Nablus), he soon headed as a refugee to the United States, where he received his B.A. from the University of Illinois (1951), and a Ph.D. in Middle East studies from Princeton University (1957). Then he spent three years as a field expert in Egypt for UNESCO, where he directed the social science research department. He would later hold several United Nations consultancies.

== Academia ==
Returning to North America, he entered a career in academia, serving on the faculties of Smith College (Northampton, Massachusetts) and McGill University, (Montreal) before settling in 1967 at Northwestern University (Evanston, Illinois), where he would remain for 34 years as a professor of political science (and department chair 1985–1988), eventually serving as Director of Graduate Studies and founding Northwestern's Institute of African Studies. During this time he founded the Association of Arab-American University Graduates (1968) and the journal Arab Studies Quarterly (1978), held two more UNESCO posts, one in Beirut and one in Paris. He became a U.S. citizen in 1975. Together with his wife, the sociologist Janet Abu-Lughod, he worked to establish a Palestinian Open University as "a means of educating a scattered nation." The project was supported by UNESCO. The program was aborted by the 1982 Israeli invasion of Lebanon, however the groundwork conducted by the Abu-Lughods formed the basis of demographic research on the Palestinian people. According to Edward Said, Abu-Lughod established a reputation as "the leading Arab academic activist in North America", with "an encyclopaedic knowledge - of the third world, Arab culture, history and language, and the western tradition of rationalism and humane understanding…" According to Kenneth Janda, "his course on the politics of the Middle East regularly attracted many Jewish students, some of whom enrolled to monitor his lectures. Invariably, they left the class professing admiration for Ibrahim's knowledge and even-handedness in dealing with the difficult political issues in the region." Noted as an orator, he spoke often on behalf of the Palestinian cause, had a strong interest in other liberation movements, and traveled extensively in the Arab world, Asia and Africa.

== Statesman ==
In 1977, he was elected to the Palestine National Council (PNC); he remained on the council until 1991. His work under the auspices of UNESCO to establish a Palestine national open university in Beirut was cut short by the 1982 Lebanon War (in which Israel invaded Lebanon after repeated attacks and counter-attacks between the Palestine Liberation Organization (PLO) operating in southern Lebanon and the IDF that had caused civilian casualties on both sides of the border); he returned to Northwestern. With Edward Said, he met in April 1988 with United States Secretary of State George Shultz. Said would write in his obituary for Abu-Lughod, "We told him that the Palestinian people were prepared to coexist with Israel if their self-determination was insured by a Middle East peace plan. What was needed was a mode of sharing and coexistence between two national communities in historic Palestine."

== Final Years ==
In 1991, having resigned from the PNC, his American citizenship allowed him to return to his homeland for the first time since 1948. During the last decade of his life he was a professor and vice-president of Bir Zeit University on the West Bank, where the university credited him with being "a pioneering champion" in establishing the faculty of graduate studies. "Palestinian society today needs a higher level of competence and specialization which is achievable only through education at the graduate level," he wrote. "We cannot depend on the achievements of other societies; we Palestinians need to generate our own specialists on the ground." During this time he was also founder of the Independent Commission for Citizens' Rights, the Centre for Curricular Reform, and the Qattan Cultural Centre in Ramallah.

Deborah J. Gerner writes that "…he was critical of the ossification of the Palestinian bureaucracy that he observed in the years following the Oslo accords and deeply troubled by the autocratic elements within the government. Yet he never gave up working for a free, independent, and democratic Palestine." He died of a lung disease in Ramallah, aged 72, and was buried in the family plot in Jaffa. Bir Zeit University honored him posthumously, naming the Ibrahim Abu-Lughod Institute of International Studies after him.

== Family ==
Abu-Lughod married Janet Abu Lughod (née Lippman) in 1951; the marriage ended in a 1991 divorce. He was survived by three daughters, Lila, Mariam, and Deena, his son Jawad, and six grandchildren.

== Works ==
This is a very partial list of Abu-Lughod's extensive writings and does not include a considerable number of journal articles.

Books authored by Abu-Lughod.

- The Arab Rediscovery Of Europe: A Study in Cultural Encounters (1963)
- The Evolution of the Meaning of Nationalism (1963)
- The transformation of the Egyptian elite : prelude to the 'Urabi Revolt (1967)

Articles authored by Abu-Lughod.

- International news in the Arabic press: a comparative content analysis. Public Opinion Quarterly 26(4): 600-612. (1962)
- The Mass Media and Egyptian Village Life. Social Forces 42: 97-103. (1963)
- Educating a community in exile: The Palestinian experience. Journal of Palestine Studies 2(3): 94-111. (1973)
- Unconventional Violence and International Politics [with Nicholas N. Kittrie and Alan F. Sewell]. The American Journal of International Law 67(5): 100-111. (1973)
- The meaning of Beirut, 1982. Race & Class 24(4): 345-359. (1983)
- America's Palestine Policy. Arab Studies Quarterly 12(1/2): 191-201. (1990)

Works edited by Abu-Lughod.

- The Arab-Israeli Confrontation of 1967: An Arab Perspective (1970)
- The Transformation Of Palestine (1972)
- Settler regimes in Africa and the Arab world : the illusion of endurance (1974)
- African themes / Northwestern University studies in honor of Gwendolen M.Carter. (1975)
- Palestinian Rights: Affirmation and Denial (1982)
- The Landscape of Palestine: Equivocal Poetry (1999)
