= Causes of the 1948 Palestinian expulsion and flight =

During the 1948 Palestine war in which the State of Israel was established, around 700,000 (Note: The exact number of refugees is unknown. See List of estimates of the 1948 Palestinian expulsion and flight for details.) Palestinian Arabs, or 85% of the total population of the territory Israel captured, were expelled or fled from their homes. The causes of this mass displacement have been a matter of dispute, though today most scholars consider that the majority of Palestinians were directly expelled or else fled due to fear.

Causes of the exodus include direct expulsions by Israeli forces, destruction of Arab villages, psychological warfare including terrorism, dozens of massacres which caused many to flee out of fear, such as the widely publicized Deir Yassin massacre, crop burning, typhoid epidemics in some areas caused by Israeli well-poisoning, and the collapse of Palestinian leadership including the demoralizing impact of wealthier classes fleeing. Many historians consider that the events of 1948 were an instance of ethnic cleansing.

== Violence and psychological warfare ==
Zionist forces used violence and psychological warfare that initiated, accelerated and increased the Palestinian exodus. Dozens of massacres targeting Arabs were conducted by Israeli military forces and between 400 and 600 Palestinian villages were destroyed.

According to historian Benny Morris, during the exodus of Haifa "The Haganah broadcasts called on the populace to 'evacuate the women, the children and the old immediately, and send them to a safe haven.'" In his conclusions concerning the second wave of the flight, Morris also cites the atrocity factor as one of the causes, referring to the Deir Yassin massacre and how its widespread broadcast on Arab radio stations undermined Arabs' morale. Historian Yoav Gelber also considers that the "Haganah, IZL and LHI's retaliations terrified the Arabs and hastened the flight".

Biological warfare was waged against Palestinians in Operation Cast Thy Bread. On March 17 1948, the Irgun made an Arabic-language broadcast, warning urban Arabs that "typhus, cholera and similar diseases would break out heavily among them in April and May".

In their volume on the 1947–1948 period in Jerusalem and surrounding areas, O Jerusalem!, Larry Collins and Dominique Lapierre give a variety of explanations for the cause of the 1948 Palestinian exodus, but conclude, "Above all, fear and uncertainty fueled the Arabs' flight." Middle East historian Karen Armstrong described a similar mechanism.

Erskine Childers, while dismissing the fact that Arab leaders instigated the flight on radio broadcasts, points out that Zionist radio broadcasts were designed to demoralize the Arab audience. The author cites the fact that rumours were spread by the Israeli forces that they possessed the atomic bomb. Historian Rashid Khalidi similarly points to what he describes as the Zionist "psychological offensive" which was highlighted by, though not limited to, radio messages warning the Arabs of diseases, the ineffectiveness of armed resistance and the incompetence of their leaders.

According to historian Ilan Pappé, the Haganah engaged in what it called "violent reconnaissance", in which "[s]pecial units of the Haganah would enter villages looking for 'infiltrators' ... and distribute leaflets warning the people against cooperating with the Arab Liberation Army. Any resistance to such an incursion usually ended with the Jewish troops firing at random and killing several villagers." Khalidi mentions "repeated and merciless raids against sleeping villages carried out in conformity with plan C", i.e. in the period before April 1948.

Various authors give examples of instigation of whisper campaigns. Childers cites the fact that rumours were spread by the Israeli forces that they possessed the atomic bomb. Morris cites Yigal Allon, the Palmach commander, describing such a campaign: "I gathered the Jewish mukhtars, who had ties with the different Arab villages, and I asked them to whisper in the ears of several Arabs that giant Jewish reinforcements had reached the Galilee and were about to clean out the villages of the Hula, [and] to advise them, as friends, to flee while they could. And the rumour spread throughout the Hula that the time had come to flee. The flight encompassed tens of thousands. The stratagem fully achieved its objective."

=== Shelling of civilians ===
Khalidi illustrates the psychological warfare of the Haganah by the use of the Davidka mortar. He writes that it was a "the Zionists favorite weapon", which they used against civilians: "the Davidka tossed a shell containing 60 lbs. of TNT usually into crowded built-up civilian quarters where the noise and blast maddened women and children into a frenzy of fear and panic."

Various authors mention specific cases in which the Yishuv engaged in shelling of civilians:

- Morris says that during the battle of Tiberias the Haganah engaged in bombarding the Arab population with mortars
- Morris says that during the exodus of Haifa a primary aim of mortar barrages was demoralisation: "The Haganah mortar attacks of 21–22 April were primarily designed to break Arab morale in order to bring about a swift collapse of resistance and speedy surrender.... But clearly the offensive, and especially the mortarring, precipitated the exodus. The three inch mortars 'opened up on the market square [where there was] a great crowd ... a great panic took hold. The multitude burst into the port, pushed aside the policemen, charged the boats and began to flee the town', as the official Haganah history later put it."
- Nathan Krystall writes: "As a precursor to its attack on Qatamon, the Zionist forces subjected the neighborhood to weeks of heavy artillery shelling. On 22 April, the Arab National Committee of Jerusalem ordered its local branches to relocate all women, children, and elderly people from the neighborhood."
- In his report concerning the fall of Jaffa the local Arab military commander, Michel Issa, writes: "Continuous shelling with mortars of the city by Jews for four days, beginning 25 April, ... caused inhabitants of city, unaccustomed to such bombardment, to panic and flee." According to Morris the shelling was done by the Irgun. Their objective was "to prevent constant military traffic in the city, to break the spirit of the enemy troops [and] to cause chaos among the civilian population in order to create a mass flight". High Commissioner Cunningham wrote a few days later "It should be made clear that IZL attack with mortars was indiscriminate and designed to create panic among the civilian inhabitants."

=== Massacres ===
Dozens of massacres were committed against Palestinians during the war, including the Balad al-Shaykh massacre 31 Dec 1947, Sasa massacre 15 Feb 1948, Deir Yassin massacre 9 Apr 1948, Ein al-Zeitun massacre 1 May 1948, Abu Shusha massacre, Tantura massacre 23 May 1948, Lydda massacre 12 July 1948, Dawayima massacre 29 Oct 1948, and the Safsaf massacre 29 Oct 1948.

In his memoirs the Palestinian Arab physician Elias Srouji claims massacres were intended to scare inhabitants. He wrote:

Tactics became even more brutal when the Zionists were ready to complete their occupation of the Galilee in October. By that time the Arab villagers, having seen what had happened elsewhere, had become adamant about staying put in their homes and on their lands. To frighten them away, the occupying forces started a strategy of planned massacres, which were carried out in Eilabun, Faradiyya, Safsaf, Sa'sa', and other villages. In places where this was not to their advantage for one reason or another, the army would resort to forceful expulsion. I was to witness some of these tactics in Rameh a month or so later.

Nathan Krystall writes:

News of the attack on and massacre in Deir Yassin spread quickly throughout Palestine. De Reynier argued that the "general terror" was "astutely fostered by the Jews, with Haganah radio incessantly repeating 'Remember Deir Yassin' and loudspeaker vans broadcasting messages in Arabic such as: 'Unless you leave your homes, the fate of Deir Yassin will be your fate.'"

According to historian Simha Flapan, "from another perspective, [the Deir Yassin massacre] made perfect sense. More panic was sown among the Arab population by this operation than by anything that had happened up to then.... While Ben-Gurion condemned the massacre in no uncertain terms, he did nothing to curb the independent actions of the Jewish underground armies."

== Historiography ==
Scholarship today generally considers that violence and direct expulsions perpetrated by Zionist forces throughout both phases of the 1947–1949 Palestine war (both during the civil war phase and during the 1948–1949 Arab–Israeli war) were the primary cause of the displacement of the Palestinians. (Note: Slater, Jerome (2020). Mythologies Without End: The US, Israel, and the Arab-Israeli Conflict, 1917–2020. Oxford University Press, Incorporated. ISBN 978-0-19-045908-6. “There is no serious dispute among Israeli, Palestinian, or other historians about the central facts of the Nakba. All of the leading Israeli New Historians—particularly Morris, Shlaim, Pappé, and Flapan—extensively examined the issue and revealed the facts. Other accounts have reached the same conclusions. For example, see Ben-Ami, "A War to Start All Wars"; Rashid Khalidi, "The Palestinians and 1948"; Walid Khalidi, "Why Did the Palestinians Leave, Revisited"; Masalha, Expulsion of the Palestinians; Raz, Bride and the Dowry. Reviewing the evidence marshaled by Morris and others, Tom Segev concluded that "most of the Arabs in the country, approximately 400,000, were chased out and expelled during the first stage of the war. In other words, before the Arab armies invaded the country" (Haaretz, July 18, 2010). Other estimates have varied concerning the number of Palestinians who fled or were expelled before the May 1948 Arab state attack; Morris estimated the number to be 250,000–300,000 (The Birth of the Palestinian Refugee Problem Revisited, 262); Tessler puts it at 300,000 (A History of the Israeli-Palestinian Conflict, 279); Pappé's estimate is 380,000 (The Making of the Arab-Israeli Conflict, 96). In another recent review of the evidence, the Israeli historian Daniel Blatman estimates the number to be about 500,000 (Blatman, "Netanyahu, This Is What Ethnic Cleansing Really Looks Like"). Whatever the exact number, even Israeli "Old Historians" now admit that during the 1948 war, the Israeli armed forces drove out many of the Palestinians, though they emphasized the action as a military "necessity." For example, see Anita Shapira, Israel: A History, 167–68.) (Note: Abu-Laban, Yasmeen; Bakan, Abigail B. (July 2022). "Anti-Palestinian Racism and Racial Gaslighting". The Political Quarterly, Vol. 93, Issue 3, p. 511: "Palestinians have long known what happened to them in 1948 and its very human costs. However, the work of the ‘new’ (or revisionist) Israeli historians from the late 1970s also challenged the official state narrative of a miraculous wartime victory through access to material in the Israeli archives. This has established what Ilan Pappé has summarised as the ‘ethnic cleansing of Palestine’, a process involving massacres and expulsions at gunpoint. In light of the ever-growing historiography, serious scholarship has left little debate about what happened in 1948. [...] However, Nakba denial remains a political issue of the highest order.) (Note: Khalidi, R. R. (1988). Revisionist Views of the Modern History of Palestine: 1948. Arab Studies Quarterly, 10(4), 425–432. http://www.jstor.org/stable/41857981 — "Segev's was the first account published in book form to use the Israeli archives to show that mass expulsions of the Palestinians by the Zionist forces, before May 15, 1948, and in succeeding months by the Israeli army, were the main cause of their flight.") Many historians consider that the events of 1948 fit the definition of ethnic cleansing. (Note: Laila Parsons, McGill University, 2009, Review of Ilan Pappé's 'The Ethnic Cleansing of Palestine', "Ilan Pappe has added another work to the many that have already been written in English on the 1948 Arab–Israeli War and the expulsion of more than 750,000 Palestinians from their homes. These include works by Walid Khalidi, Simha Flapan, Nafez Nazzal, Benny Morris, Nur Masalha, and Norman Finkelstein, among others. All but one of these authors (Morris) would probably agree with Pappe’s position that what happened to the Palestinians in 1948 fits the definition of ethnic cleansing, and it certainly is not news to Palestinians themselves, who have always known what happened to them.")

In a review of scholarship on the topic, Jerome Slater asserted that the New Historians had decisively refuted "the conventional Zionist-Israeli mythology" that most of the 700,000 Palestinian Arabs had "fled" voluntarily. The "mythology" held that until the Arab states invaded Palestine to begin the 1948 Arab–Israeli War that the Zionist forces had attempted to demonstrate a willingness to coexist and attempted to keep the Arabs to stay. The New Historians have however established this to be false, and that "well before the Arab invasion some 300,000 to 400,000 Palestinians (out of a population of about 900,000 at the time of the UN partition) were either forcibly expelled—sometimes by forced marches with only the clothes on their backs—or fled as a result of Israeli psychological warfare, economic pressures, and violence, designed to empty the area that would become Israel of most of its Arab inhabitants." Rather than the Arab invasion being responsible for the flight of the Palestinian Arabs, Walid Khalidi wrote that: "It was not the entry of the Arab armies that caused the exodus. It was the exodus that caused the entry of the Arab armies." Massacres and forced expulsions of Palestinian Arabs by Zionist forces were either tolerated or implemented by the Yishuv leadership, with Yitzhak Rabin reporting on the orders he received in the expulsion of 50,000–70,000 Palestinians from Lydda and Ramle that David Ben-Gurion "waved his hand in a gesture which said, 'Drive them out.'" Tom Segev, discussing Plan Dalet, wrote that Yigael Yadin clarified Ben-Gurion's instructions to "break the spirit" of the Arab population, adding an appendix to the plan that gave the commanders the options of expelling the Arabs, cutting off essential services, including water and electricity, and "sowing terror" through propaganda.

=== Denialism ===
There is historical denialism pertaining to the 1948 Palestinian expulsion and flight. Nakba denial has been cited by scholars to include the denial of historically documented violence against Palestinians and the notion that Palestinian dispossession was part of mutual transfers between Arabs and Jews justified by war.

Some historians say that Nakba denial was largely facilitated by early Israeli historiography. Beginning in the 1980s, the Israeli New Historians challenged denialist accounts, working from newly declassified archival documents.

=== Early Israeli historiography ===
Historian Avi Shlaim writes that the "conventional Zionist account" of the 1948 war is "not history in the proper sense of the word" and that much of the initial writing on the war was done by state-sponsored historians rather than by professional historians.

Glazer in 1980 summarized the view of Zionist historians, notably Joseph Schechtman, Hans Kohn, Jon Kimche, and Marie Syrkin, as being:

According to Zionist historians, the Arabs in Palestine were asked to stay and live as citizens in the Jewish state. Instead, they chose to leave, either because they were unwilling to live with the Jews, or because they expected an Arab military victory which would annihilate the Zionists. They thought they could leave temporarily and return at their leisure. Later, an additional claim was put forth, namely that the Palestinians were ordered to leave, with radio broadcasts instructing them to quit their homes.

At that time, Zionist historians generally attributed the Arab leaders' alleged calls for a mass evacuation to the period before the proclamation of Israeli statehood. They generally believed that, after that period, expulsion became standard policy and was carried out systematically. As described below, the narratives presented have been influenced by the release of previously unseen documents in the 1980s.

Glazer also says: "Israeli public opinion has maintained that as the Arabs planned to massacre the Jews, when the Jews began winning the war the Arabs fled, fearing the same treatment would be suffered on them."

Palestinian historian Nur Masalha quotes Chaim Weizmann as calling the Palestinian exodus "a miraculous clearing of the land: the miraculous simplification of Israel's task", while Masalha himself writes that it was "less of a miracle than it was the culmination of over a half century of effort, plans, and (in the end) brute force."

=== New Historians ===
In the 1980s Israel and United Kingdom opened up part of their archives for investigation by historians. This favored a more critical and factual analysis of the 1948 events and led to the emergence of the Israeli New Historians who published more detailed and comprehensive descriptions of the Palestinian exodus. Perhaps most influential of the early works of the New Historians was Benny Morris' The Birth of the Palestinian Refugee Problem, published in 1988. In an essay in 1988 Morris wrote that "Jewish atrocities [were] far more widespread than the Old Historians have indicated (there were massacres of Arabs at Dawayima, Eilabun, Jish, Safsaf, Hule, Saliha, and Sasa besides Deir Yassin and Lydda)".

According to Shay Hazkani, 2013: "In the past two decades, following the powerful reverberations (concerning the cause of the Nakba) triggered by the publication of books written by those dubbed the "New Historians," the Israeli archives revoked access to much of the explosive material. Archived Israeli documents that reported the expulsion of Palestinians, massacres or rapes perpetrated by Israeli soldiers, along with other events considered embarrassing by the establishment, were reclassified as "top secret.""

== Concept of "transfer" in Zionism ==
The Zionist concept of "transfer" was cited by Palestinian authors such as Nur Masalha and Walid Khalidi to support their argument that the Zionist Yishuv followed an expulsion policy, and Israeli authors such as Simha Flapan. Nur Masalha defines "the Zionist concept of "transfer"" as "a euphemism denoting the organized removal of the indigenous population of Palestine to neighboring countries." (Note: Masalha 1994 "The Zionist concept of “transfer”—a euphemism denoting the organized removal of the indigenous population of Palestine to neighboring countries.") Other Israeli historians, such as Morris, reject the idea that "transfer" thinking led to a political expulsion policy as such, but they explain that the idea of transfer was endorsed in practice by mainstream Zionist leaders, particularly David Ben-Gurion.

Masalha writes that "the idea of transfer is as old as the early Zionist colonies in Palestine and the rise of political Zionism. It can be said to be the logical outgrowth of the ultimate goal of the Zionist movement, which was the establishment of a Jewish state through colonization and land acquisition—in other words, through a radical ethno-religious-demographic transformation of a country, the population of which had been almost entirely Arab at the start of the Zionist venture."

The idea that "transfer ideology" contributed to the exodus was first brought up by several Palestinian authors, and supported by Erskine Childers in his 1971 article, "The wordless wish". In 1961 Walid Khalidi referred to the transfer idea to support his idea that the Yishuv followed an expulsion policy in April and May 1948. In the 1980s, historian Benny Morris became the most well-known advocate of the existence of the "transfer idea". According to Morris, while not discounting other reasons for the exodus, the "transfer principle" theory suggests that this prevalent "attitude of transfer" is what made it easy for the Jewish population to accept it and for local Haganah and IDF commanders to resort to various means of expelling the Arab population.

He also notes that the attempt to achieve a demographic shift through aliyah (Jewish immigration to the land of Israel) had not been successful. As a result, some Zionist leaders adopted the transfer of a large Arab population as the only viable solution. Morris also points out that "[if] Zionist support for 'Transfer' really is 'unambiguous'; the connection between that support and what actually happened during the war is far more tenuous than Arabs propagandists will allow." (Morris, p. 6)

To this he adds that "From April 1948, Ben-Gurion is projecting a message of transfer. There is no explicit order of his in writing, there is no orderly comprehensive policy, but there is an atmosphere of [population] transfer. The transfer idea is in the air. The entire leadership understands that this is the idea. The officer corps understands what is required of them. Under Ben-Gurion, a consensus of transfer is created."

=== Origins of the "Transfer Idea" ===
Benny Morris identifies two major strands of historiography on this question. On the one hand, anti-Zionists such as Nur Masala and Norman Finkelstein claim that "what happened in 1948 was simply a systematic implementation of Zionist ideology and of a Zionist ‘master-plan’ of expulsion"; on the other, Zionists such as Anita Shapira and Shabtai Teveth claim that "the sporadic talk among Zionist leaders of ‘transfer’ was mere pipe-dreaming and was never undertaken systematically or seriously".

Morris himself suggests that, on the one hand, the idea of transfer was "inevitable and inbuilt into Zionism" to the extent that it involved "transform[ing] a land which was 'Arab' into a 'Jewish' state and a Jewish state could not have arisen without a major displacement of Arab population"; but that, on the other, "there was no pre-war Zionist plan to expel ‘the Arabs’ from Palestine or the areas of the emergent Jewish State; and the Yishuv did not enter the war with a plan or policy of expulsion. Nor was the pre-war ‘transfer’ thinking ever translated, in the course of the war, into an agreed, systematic policy of expulsion."

Other authors, including Palestinian writers and Israeli New Historians, have also described this attitude as a prevalent notion in Zionist thinking and as a major factor in the exodus.

=== 1930s: Peel Commission's plan and Yishuv's reaction ===
According to the political scientist Norman Finkelstein, population transfer was considered as an acceptable solution to the problems of ethnic conflict until around World War II and even for a time afterward. Transfer was considered a drastic but "often necessary" means to end an ethnic conflict or ethnic civil war. Yossi Katz writes that population transfer was adopted as a tool for conflict resolution between nations after the Greco-Turkish War and became an adopted model in various regions around the world. This model was accepted by the British Royal Commission which was sent to Palestine in 1936. The Peel Commission briefly placed the idea of population transfer on the Mandate's political agenda in 1937. The commission recommended that Britain should withdraw from Palestine and that the land be partitioned between Jews and Arabs. It called for a "transfer of land and an exchange of population", including the removal of 250,000 Palestinian Arabs from what would become the Jewish state, along the lines of the mutual population exchange between the Turkish and Greek populations after the Greco-Turkish War of 1922. According to the plan "in the last resort" the transfer of Arabs from the Jewish part would be compulsory. The transfer would be voluntary in as far as Arab leaders were required to agree with it, but after that it would be almost inevitable that it would have to be forced upon the population.

According to Nur Masalha, extensive lobbying by Zionist leaders had been necessary for the Peel commission to propose this "in the last resort" compulsory transfer. Shertok, Weizmann and Ben-Gurion had travelled to London to talk it over, not only with members of the commission, but also with numerous politicians and officials whom the commission would be likely to consult. Zionist leaders supported this solution. Masalha also says that Ben-Gurion saw partition only as an intermediate stage in the establishment of Israel, before the Jewish state could expand to all of Palestine using force.

According to Morris, Arab leaders, such as Emir Abdullah of Transjordan and Nuri as-Said of Iraq, supported the idea of a population transfer. However, while Ben-Gurion was in favor of the Peel plan, he and other Zionist leaders considered it important that it be publicized as a British plan and not a Zionist plan. To this end, Morris quotes Moshe Sharett, director of the Jewish Agency's Political Department, who said (during a meeting of the Jewish Agency Executive (JAE) on 7 May 1944) to consider the British Labour Party Executive's resolution supporting transfer:

Transfer could be the crowning achievements, the final stage in the development of [our] policy, but certainly not the point of departure. By [speaking publicly and prematurely] we could mobilizing vast forces against the matter and cause it to fail, in advance.... What will happen once the Jewish state is established—it is very possible that the result will be the transfer of Arabs.

All of the other members of the JAE present, including several individuals who would later become Israeli ministers, spoke favorably of the transfer principle. Morris summarises the attitude of the Jewish Agency Executive on 12 June 1938 as: "all preferred a 'voluntary' transfer; but most were also agreeable to a compulsory transfer."

At the Zionist Congress, held in Zurich, the Peel Commission's plan was discussed and rejected on the ground that a larger share of Palestine should be assigned to the Jewish state. According to Masalha, forced transfer was accepted as morally just by a majority, although many doubted its feasibility. Partition, however, was not acceptable for Ussishkin, head of the Jewish National Fund, who said:

The Arab people have immense areas of land at their disposal; our people have nothing except a grave's plot. We demand that our inheritance, Palestine, be returned to us, and if there is no room for Arabs, they have the opportunity of going to Iraq.

The immediately succeeding Woodhead Commission, called to "examine the Peel Commission plan in detail and to recommend an actual partition plan" effectively removed the idea of transfer from the options under consideration by the British.

According to Masalha "the defeat of the partition plan in no way diminished the determination of the Ben-Gurion camp ... to continue working for the removal of the native population." In November 1937 a Population Transfer Committee was appointed to investigate the practicalities of transfer. It discussed details of the costs, specific places for relocation of the Palestinians, and the order in which they should be transferred. In view of the need for land it concluded that the rural population should be transferred before the townspeople, and that a village by village manner would be best. In June 1938 Ben-Gurion summed up the mood in the JAE: "I support compulsory transfer. I do not see anything immoral in it." Regarding the unwillingness of the British to implement it, land expropriation was seen as a major mechanism to precipitate a Palestinian exodus. Also the remaining Palestinians should not be left with substantial landholdings.

=== "Transfer Idea" during 1947–1949 ===
In early November 1947, some weeks before the UN partition resolution, the Jewish Agency Executive decided that it would be best to deny Israeli citizenship to as many Arabs as possible. As Ben-Gurion explained, in the event of hostilities, if the Arabs also held citizenship of the Arab state it would be possible to expel them as resident aliens, which was better than imprisoning them.

In Flapan's view, with the proclamation of the birth of Israel and the Arab governments' invasion into the new state, those Arabs who had remained in Israel after 15 May were viewed as "a security problem", a potential fifth column, even though they had not participated in the war and had stayed in Israel hoping to live in peace and equality, as promised in the Declaration of Independence. In the opinion of the author, that document had not altered Ben-Gurion's overall conception: once the Arab areas he considered vital to the constitution of the new state had been brought under Israeli control, there still remained the problem of their inhabitants.

According to Flapan "Ben-Gurion appointed what became known as the transfer committee, composed of Weitz, Danin, and Zalman Lipshitz, a cartographer. At the basis of its recommendations, presented to Ben-Gurion in October 1948, was the idea that the number of Arabs should not amount to more than 15 percent of Israel's total population, which at that time meant about 100,000."

In the view of Flapan records are available from archives and diaries which while not revealing a specific plan or precise orders for expulsion, they provide overwhelming circumstantial evidence to show that a design was being implemented by the Haganah, and later by the IDF, to reduce the number of Arabs in the Jewish state to a minimum and to make use of most of their lands, properties, and habitats to absorb the masses of Jewish immigrants. According to Michael Bar-Zohar, appeals to "the Arabs to stay" were political gestures for external audiences whereas "[i]n internal discussions", Ben-Gurion communicated that "it was better that the smallest possible number of Arabs remain within the area of the state."

Flapan quotes Ben-Gurion several times in order to prove this basic stand:

- After the flight of the Arabs began Ben-Gurion himself wrote in his diary, "We must afford civic and human equality to every Arab who remains, [but, he insisted,] it is not our task to worry about the return of the Arabs."
- On 11 May Ben-Gurion noted that he had given orders "for the destruction of Arab islands in Jewish population areas".
- During the early years of the state, Ben-Gurion stated that "the Arabs cannot accept the existence of Israel. Those who accept it are not normal. The best solution for the Arabs in Israel is to go and live in the Arab states—in the framework of a peace treaty or transfer."

Nur Masalha also gives several quotes of Ben-Gurion supporting it:

- On 7 February 1948, commenting on the de-Arabisation of parts of Western Jerusalem he told the Mapai Council: "What happened in Jerusalem ... is likely to happen in many parts of the country ... in six, eight or ten months of the campaign there will certainly be great changes in the composition of the population in the country."
- On 6 April he told the Zionist Actions Committee: "We will not be able to win the war if we do not, during the war, populate upper and lower, eastern and western Galilee, the Negev and Jerusalem area.... I believe that war will also bring in its wake a great change in the distribution of the Arab population."

Flapan considers that "hand in hand with measures to ensure the continued exodus of Arabs from Israel was a determination not to permit any of the refugees to return. He claims that all of the Zionist leaders (Ben-Gurion, Sharett, and Weizmann) agreed on this point."

The assessment of historian Jerome Slater was that:

"From the UN partition proclamation through the 1948 war, Ben-Gurion and other Zionist leaders deliberately implemented the long-held Zionist goal of "transfer" by driving hundreds of thousands of Palestinians out of Israel."

=== Criticisms of the "Transfer Idea" ===
The "transfer principle" theory was attacked by Efraim Karsh. Karsh argued that transferist thinking was a fringe philosophy within Zionism, and had no significant effect on expulsions. He gives two specific points of criticism:

- Karsh cites evidence supporting the idea that Ben-Gurion and the Jewish Agency Executive (JAE) did not agree on transfer of Palestinian Arabs but rather had a much more tolerant vision of Arab-Jewish coexistence:
  - Ben-Gurion's at a JAE meeting in 1936: "We do not deny the right of the Arab inhabitants of the country, and we do not see this right as a hindrance to the realization of Zionism".
  - Ben-Gurion to his party members: "In our state there will be non-Jews as well—and all of them will be equal citizens; equal in everything without any exception; that is: the state will be their state as well".
  - in an October 1941 internal policy paper: "Jewish immigration and colonization in Palestine on a large scale can be carried out without displacing Arabs", and: "in a Jewish Palestine the position of the Arabs will not be worse than the position of the Jews themselves".
  - explicit instructions of Israel Galili, the Haganah's commander-in-chief: "acknowledgement of the full rights, needs, and freedom of the Arabs in the Hebrew state without any discrimination, and a desire for coexistence on the basis of mutual freedom and dignity".
- According to Karsh there was never any Zionist attempt to inculcate the "transfer" idea in the hearts and minds of Jews. He could find no evidence of any press campaign, radio broadcasts, public rallies, or political gatherings, for none existed. Furthermore, in Karsh's opinion the idea of transfer was forced on the Zionist agenda by the British (in the recommendations of the 1937 Peel Royal Commission on Palestine) rather than being self-generated.

== "Master Plan" explanation ==
Based on the aforementioned alleged prevalent idea of transfer, and on actual expulsions that took place in the 1948 Arab–Israeli war, Walid Khalidi, a Palestinian historian, introduced a thesis in 1961 according to which the Palestinian exodus was planned in advance by the Zionist leadership.

Khalidi based his thesis on Plan Dalet, a plan devised by the Haganah high command in March 1948, which stipulated, among other things, that if Palestinians in villages controlled by the Jewish troops resist, they should be expelled. Plan Dalet was aimed to establish Jewish sovereignty over the land allocated to the Jews by the United Nations (Resolution 181), and to prepare the ground toward the expected invasion of Palestine by Arab states after the imminent establishment of the state of Israel. In addition, it was introduced while Jewish–Palestinian fighting was already underway and while thousands of Palestinians had already fled. Nevertheless, Khalidi argued that the plan was a master plan for the expulsion of the Palestinians from the territories controlled by the Jews. He argued that there was an omnipresent understanding during the war that as many Palestinian Arabs as possible had to be transferred out of the Jewish state, and that this understanding stood behind many of the expulsions that the commanders in the field carried out.

Glazer argued that evidence showed that Zionist leaders were already thinking about removal of the Palestinian population before it actually occurred. On 7 February 1948, Ben-Gurion told the Central Committee of Mapai (the largest Zionist political party in Palestine):

it is most probable that in the 6, 8 or 10 coming months of the struggle many great changes will take place, very great in this country and not all of them to our disadvantage, and surely a great change in the composition of the population in the country.

Glazer stated that the 1947 Partition Resolution awarded an area to the Jewish state whose population was 46 percent Arab and where much of this land was owned by Arabs. He considers that

it has been argued by the Zionists that they were prepared to make special accommodations for this large population; yet it is difficult to see how such accommodations could have coalesced with their plans for large-scale Jewish immigration; moreover, by 1 August 1948, the Israeli government had already stated that it was 'economically unfeasible' to allow the return of the Arabs, at the very time when Jewish refugees were already entering the country and being settled on abandoned Arab property.

=== Planning by Ben-Gurion ===
According to Flapan "the Jewish army ... under the leadership of Ben-Gurion, planned and executed the expulsion in the wake of the UN Partition Resolution." According to Ilan Pappé, Ben-Gurion headed a group of eleven people, a combination of military and security figures and specialists on Arab affairs. From October 1947 this group met weekly to discuss issues of security and strategy towards the Arab world and the Palestinians. At a meeting on 10 March 1948, this group put the final touches on Plan Dalet, which, according to Pappé, was the blueprint for what he called the "ethnic cleansing" of Palestine. According to Plan Dalet, a Palestinian village was to be expelled if it was located on a strategic spot or if it put up some sort of resistance when it was occupied by Yishuv forces. According to Pappé "it was clear that occupation would always provoke some resistance and that therefore no village would be immune, either because of its location or because it would not allow itself to be occupied." Ben-Gurion's group met less frequently after Israel declared independence because, according to Pappé, "Plan Dalet ... had been working well, and needed no further coordination and direction."

However, according to Gelber, Plan Dalet instructions were: In case of resistance, the population of conquered villages was to be expelled outside the borders of the Jewish state. If no resistance was met, the residents could stay put, under military rule.

During a 26 September 1948 meeting of the provisional Israeli cabinet, Ben-Gurion proposed ending the current ceasefire. His reasons remained classified when the cabinet minutes were released, but revealed by Tom Segev in 2013:

If war broke out, we would then be able to clear the entire central Galilee with one fell swoop. But we cannot empty the central Galilee—that is, including the [Arab] refugees—without a war going on. The Galilee is full of [Arab] residents; it is not an empty region. If war breaks out throughout the entire country, this would be advantageous for us as far as the Galilee is concerned because, without having to make any major effort—we could use just enough of the force required for the purpose without weakening our military efforts in other parts of the country—we could empty the Galilee completely.

However, the proposal was not passed by the cabinet.

=== Role of the Yishuv's official decision-making bodies ===
Flapan says that "it must be understood that official Jewish decision-making bodies (the provisional government, the National Council, and the Jewish Agency Executive) neither discussed nor approved a design for expulsion, and any proposal of the sort would have been opposed and probably rejected. These bodies were heavily influenced by liberal, progressive labor, and socialist Zionist parties. The Zionist movement as a whole, both the left and the right, had consistently stressed that the Jewish people, who had always suffered persecution and discrimination as a national and religious minority, would provide a model of fair treatment of minorities in their own state." The author later maintains that "once the flight began, however, Jewish leaders encouraged it. Sharett, for example, immediately declared that no mass return of Palestinians to Israel would be permitted." According to Flapan, "[Aharon] Cohen (head of Mapam's Arab department) insisted in October 1948 that 'the Arab exodus was not part of a preconceived plan.' But, he acknowledged, 'a part of the flight was due to official policy.... Once it started, the flight received encouragement from the most important Jewish sources, for both military and political reasons.'"

=== Criticisms of "Master Plan" explanation ===
Historians skeptical of the "Master Plan" emphasize that no central directive has surfaced from the archives and argue that, had such an understanding been widespread, it would have left a mark in the vast documentation produced by the Zionist leadership at the time. Furthermore, Yosef Weitz, who was strongly in favor of expulsion, had explicitly asked Ben-Gurion for such a directive and was turned down. Finally, settlement policy guidelines drawn up between December 1947 and February 1948, designed to handle the absorption of the anticipated first million immigrants, planned for some 150 new settlements, of which about half were located in the Negev, while the remainder were sited along the lines of the UN partition map (29 November 1947) in the north and centre of the country.

According to Efraim Karsh:

Israeli forces did on occsasion expel Palestinians. But this accounted for only a small fraction of the total exodus, occurred not within the framework of a premeditated plan but in the heat of battle, and was dictated predominantly by military ad hoc considerations (notably the need to deny strategic sites to the enemy if there were no available Jewish forces to hold them).... Indeed, even the largest expulsions, during the battle for Lydda in July 1948, emanated from a string of unexpected developments on the ground and in no way foreseen in military plans for the capture of the town.

New historian Avi Shlaim considers that while Plan Dalet "both permitted and justified" the expulsion of the Palestinians, it was not a "political blueprint" but rather a military plan with territorial objectives.

In his 2004 book, The Birth of the Palestinian Refugee Problem Revisited, Morris wrote, "My feeling is that the transfer thinking and near-consensus that emerged in the 1930s and early 1940s was not tantamount to pre-planning and did not issue in the production of a policy or master-plan of expulsion; the Yishuv and its military forces did not enter the 1948 War, which was initiated by the Arab side, with a policy or plan for expulsion." Morris also states that he could not find anything in the Israeli archives that would prove the existence of a Zionist plan to expel Palestinians in 1948. Elsewhere Morris has said that the expulsion of the Palestinians did amount to ethnic cleansing, and that the action was justifiable considering the circumstances.

Yoav Gelber notes that documentation exists showing that David Ben-Gurion "regarded the escape as a calculated withdrawal of non-combatant population upon the orders of Arab commanders and out of military considerations", which is contradictory to the hypothesis of a master plan he may have drawn up.

Concerning Plan Dalet, Gelber argues that Khalidi and Pappe's interpretation relies only on a single paragraph in a document of 75 pages, that has been taken out of its context. Describing the plan in reference to the announced intervention of the Arab armies, he argues that "it was a practical response to an emerging threat." Gelber also argues that the occupation and destruction of Arab villages described in the paragraph quoted in Khalidi's paper had the military purpose of preventing Arabs from cutting roads facilitating incursions by Arab armies, while eliminating villages that might have served as bases for attacking Jewish settlements. He also remarks that if Master Plan had been one dedicated to resolving the Arab question, it would have been written by Ben-Gurion's advisors on Arab affairs and by military officers under the supervision of the chief-of-staff Yigael Yadin.

Henry Laurens raises several objections to the views of those he calls the "intentionalists". Like Morris and Gelber he says that Plan Dalet obeyed a military logic, arguing that if it had not been followed, the strategic situation, particularly around Tel Aviv would have been as critical as that which existed around Jerusalem during the war.

Laurens cites some examples of events that indicate a contradiction in the "intentionalist" analysis. Like Gelber, he points out that Zionist authors at the beginning of the exodus considered it to be part and parcel of a "diabolic British plan" devised to impede the creation of the Jewish state. He also emphasizes that even those who had always advocated the Arab expulsion, like e.g. Yosef Weitz, had done nothing to prepare for it in advance, and thus found it necessary to improvise the "other transfer", the one dealing with transfer of Arab properties to Jewish institutions.

Globally Laurens also considers that the "intentionalism" thesis is untenable in the global context of the events and lacks historical methodology. He insists that, were the events the "intentionalists" put forward true, they are so only in terms of a priori reading of those events. To comply with such an analysis, the protagonists should have had a global consciousness of all the consequences of the project they promoted. Laurens considers that a "complot theory", on such a long time period, could not have been planned, even by a Ben-Gurion. In an "intentionalist" approach, he claims, events must be read without a priori and each action must be considered without assuming it will lead to where we know a posteriori it led but it must be considered in its context and in taking into account where the actors thought it would lead.

Laurens considers that with an appropriate approach the documentation gathered by Morris shows that the exodus was caused by mutual fears of the other side's intentions, Arabs fearing to be expelled by Zionists and in reaction Zionists fearing Arabs would prevent them by force to build their own state, and the fact that Palestine was not able to absorb both populations (he describes the situation as a zero-sum conflict).

== Morris's Four Waves analysis ==
In The Birth of the Palestinian Refugee Problem Revisited, Morris divided the Palestinian exodus in four waves and an aftermath: Morris analyses the direct causes, as opposed to his proposed indirect cause of the "transfer idea", for each wave separately.

=== Causes of the first wave, December 1947 – March 1948 ===
Morris gives no numbers regarding the first wave, but says "the spiral of violence precipitated flight by the middle and upper classes of the big towns, especially Haifa, Jaffa and Jerusalem, and their satellite rural communities. It also prompted the piecemeal, but almost complete, evacuation of the Arab rural population from what was to be the heartland of the Jewish State—the Coastal Plain between Tel Aviv and Hadera—and a small-scale partial evacuation of other rural areas hit by hostilities and containing large Jewish concentrations, namely the Jezreel and Jordan valleys." More specific to the causes Morris states: "The Arab evacuees from the towns and villages left largely because of Jewish ... attacks or fear of impending attack, and from a sense of vulnerability." According to Morris expulsions were "almost insignificant" and "many more left as a result of orders or advice from Arab military commanders and officials" to safer areas within the country. The Palestinian leadership struggled against the exodus.

Decisive causes of abandonment of Palestinian villages and towns according to Benny Morris
Decisive causes of abandonment	Occurrences (Note: Some villages were assigned multiple causes and therefore the total amount of occurrences, 440, is higher than the total amount of towns and villages, 392.)
military assault on settlement (Note: The lines between these causes are somewhat blurred. Cases were generally ascribed to "military assault on settlement," even if the flight had already begun upon hearing of the fall of a neighboring village and before the Israeli military approached.)	215
influence of nearby town's fall	59
expulsion by Jewish forces	53
fear (of being caught up in fighting)	48
whispering campaigns	15
abandonment on Arab orders	6
unknown	44

=== Causes of the second wave, April–June 1948 ===
According to Morris the "Haganah and IZL offensives in Haifa, Jaffa and eastern and western Galilee precipitated a mass exodus." "Undoubtedly ... the most important single factor in the exodus of April–June was Jewish attack. This is demonstrated clearly by the fact that each exodus occurred during or in the immediate wake of military assault. No town was abandoned by the bulk of its population before the main Haganah/IZL assault." Also many villages were abandoned during attacks, but others were evacuated because the inhabitants feared they would be next. A major factor in the exodus was the undermining of Palestinian morale due to the earlier fall and exodus from other towns and villages. Morris says that the "Palestinian leaders and commanders struggled against [the exodus]" but in many cases encouraged evacuation of women children and old people out of harms way and in some cases ordered villages to evacuate.

Regarding expulsions (Morris defines expulsions as "when a Haganah/IDF/IZL/LHI unit entered or conquered a town or village and then ordered its inhabitants to leave") Morris says that the Yishuv leaders "were reluctant to openly order or endorse expulsions" in towns but "Haganah commanders exercised greater independence and forcefulness in the countryside": "In general Haganah operational orders for attacks on towns did not call for the expulsion or eviction of the civilian population. But from early April, operational orders for attacks on villages and clusters of villages more often than not called for the destruction of villages and, implicitly or explicitly, expulsion." Issuing expulsion orders was hardly necessary though, because "most villages were completely or almost completely empty by the time they were conquered", "the inhabitants usually fled with the approach of the advancing Jewish column or when the first mortar bombs began to hit their homes."

=== Causes of the third and fourth waves, July–October 1948 and October–November 1948 ===
In July "altogether, the Israeli offensives of the Ten Days and the subsequent clearing operations probably send something over 100,000 Arabs into exile." About half of these were expelled from Lydda and Ramle on 12 through 14 July. Morris says that expulsion orders were given for both towns, the one for Ramle calling for "sorting out of the inhabitants, and send the army-age males to a prisoner-of-war camp". "The commanders involved understood that what was happening was an expulsion rather than a spontaneous exodus."

In October and November Operations Yoav in the Negev and Hiram in central Galilee were aimed at destroying enemy formations of respectively the Egyptian army and the Arab Liberation Army, and precipitated the flight of 200,000–230,000 Arabs. The UN mediator on Palestine Folke Bernadotte reported in September 1948 that Palestinian flight, "resulted from panic created by fighting in their communities, by rumours concerning real or alleged acts of terrorism, or expulsion". United Nations observers reported in October that Israeli policy was that of "uprooting Arabs from their native villages in Palestine by force or threat". In the Negev the clearing was more complete because "the OC, Allon, was known to want "Arab-clean" areas along his line of advance" and "his subordinates usually acted in accordance" and the inhabitants were almost uniformly Muslim. In the Galilee pocket, for various reasons, about 30–50 per cent of the inhabitants stayed. More specifically regarding the causes of the exodus Morris says: "Both commanders were clearly bent on driving out the population in the area they were conquering," and "Many, perhaps most, [Arabs] expected to be driven out, or worse. Hence, when the offensives were unleashed, there was a 'coalescence' of Jewish and Arab expectations, which led, especially in the south, to spontaneous flight by most of the inhabitants. And, on both fronts, IDF units 'nudged' Arabs into flight and expelled communities."

Main causes of the Palestinian exodus according to Israeli historian Benny Morris
Wave	Period	Refugees	Main causes
First wave	December 1947 – March 1948	about 100,000	sense of vulnerability, attacks and fear of impending attack
Second wave	April–June 1948	250,000–300,000	attacks and fear of impending attack
Third wave	July–October 1948	about 100,000	attacks and expulsions
Fourth wave	October–November 1948	200,000–230,000	attacks and expulsions
Border clearings	November 1948 – 1950	30,000-40,000	

== Gelber's two-stage analysis ==
The "Two-stage explanation" brought forth by Yoav Gelber synthetises the events of 1948 in distinguishing two phases in the exodus. Before the first truce (11 June – 8 July 1948), it explains the exodus as a result of the crumbling Arab social structure that was not ready to withstand a civil war, and justified Jewish military conduct. After the truce the IDF launched counter offensives against the invading forces. Gelber explains the exodus in this stage as a result of expulsions and massacres performed by the Israeli army during Operation Dani and the campaign in the Galilee and Negev.

=== First Stage: The crumbling of Arab Palestinian social structure ===
Gelber describes the exodus before July 1948 as being initially mainly due to the inability of the Palestinian social structure to withstand a state of war :

Mass flight accompanied the fighting from the beginning of the civil war. In the absence of proper military objectives, the antagonists carried out their attacks on non-combatant targets, subjecting civilians of both sides to deprivation, intimidation and harassment. Consequently, the weaker and backward Palestinian society collapsed under a not-overly-heavy strain. Unlike the Jews, who had nowhere to go and fought with their back to the wall, the Palestinians had nearby shelters. From the beginning of hostilities, an increasing flow of refugees drifted into the heart of Arab-populated areas and into adjacent countries.... The Palestinians' precarious social structure tumbled because of economic hardships and administrative disorganization. Contrary to the Jews who built their "State in the Making" during the mandate period, the Palestinians had not created in time substitutes for the government services that vanished with the British withdrawal. The collapse of services, the lack of authority and a general feeling of fear and insecurity generated anarchy in the Arab sector.
Early in April, the Haganah launched several large-scale operations across the country.
In the last six weeks of the British mandate, the Jews occupied most of the area that the UN partition plan allotted to their State. They took over five towns and 200 villages; between 250,000 and 300,000 Palestinians and other Arabs ran away (so far, they were not driven out) to Palestine's Arab sectors and to neighboring countries.
Unlike the pre-invasion period, certain Israeli Defense Force (IDF) actions on the eve of and after the invasion aimed at driving out the Arab population from villages close to Jewish settlements or adjacent to main roads. These measures appeared necessary in face of the looming military threat by the invading Arab armies. The Israelis held the Palestinians responsible for the distress that the invasion caused and believed they deserved severe punishment. The local deportations of May–June 1948 appeared both militarily vital and morally justified. Confident that their conduct was indispensable, the troops did not attempt to conceal harsh treatment of civilians in their after-action reports.

Other historians such as Efraim Karsh, Avraham Sela, Moshe Efrat, Ian J. Bickerton, Carla L. Klausner, and Howard Sachar share this analysis. In his interpretation of the second wave (Gelber's first stage), as he names Israeli attacks (Operations Nachshon, Yiftah, Ben 'Ami, ...) Sachar considers Israeli attacks only as a secondary reason for flight, with the meltdown of the Palestinian society as the primary:

The most obvious reason for the mass exodus was the collapse of Palestine Arab political institutions that ensued upon the flight of the Arab leadership.... [O]nce this elite was gone, the Arab peasant was terrified by the likelihood of remaining in an institutional and cultural void. Jewish victories obviously intensified the fear and accelerated departure. In many cases, too ... Jews captured Arab villages, expelled the inhabitants, and blew up houses to prevent them from being used as strongholds against them. In other instances, Qawukji's men used Arab villages for their bases, provoking immediate Jewish retaliation.

According to Efraim Karsh in April 1948 "some 100,000 Palestinians, mostly from the main urban centres of Jaffa, Haifa, and Jerusalem and from villages in the coastal plain, had gone. Within a month those numbers had nearly doubled; and by early June, ... some 390,000 Palestinians had left." 30,000 Arabs, mostly intellectuals and members of the social elite, had fled Palestine in the months following the approval of the partition plan, undermining the social infrastructure of Palestine. A May 1948 Time magazine article states: "Said one British official in Jerusalem last week: 'The whole effendi class has gone. It is remarkable how many of the younger ones are suddenly deciding that this might be a good time to resume their studies at Oxford....'"

According to Avraham Sela, the Palestinian exodus began with news of the Zionists' military victories in April–May 1948:

[T]he offensive had a strong psychological effect on Palestinian-Arab villagers, whose tendency to leave under Jewish military pressure became a mass exodus.... [T]he exodus was a spontaneous movement, caused by an awareness of the Arab weakness and fear of annihilation typical in civil wars. Moreover, an early visible departure of nearly all the leadership was clearly understood as a signal, if not as an outright command.

Moshe Efrat of the Hebrew University of Jerusalem wrote:

[R]ecent studies, based on official Israeli archives, have shown that there was no official policy or instructions intended to bring about the expulsion and that most of the Palestinians who became refugees had left their homes on their own initiative, before they came face to face with Israeli forces, especially in the period between late 1947 and June 1948. Later on, Israel's civil and military leadership became more decisive about preventing refugees from returning to their homes and more willing to resort to coercion in expelling the Palestine Arabs from their homes. This was not uniformly implemented in every sector and had much to do with decisions of local military commanders and circumstances, which might explain why some 156,000 Palestinians remained in Israel at the end of the war.

Bickerton and Klausner go even further back in history by citing the British military response to the 1936–1939 Arab revolt as the decisive moment when the Palestinian leadership and infrastructure began to crumble, and, in the most extreme cases, were expelled by the British from what was then the British Mandate for Palestine. Bickerton and Klausner conclude:

Palestinian leadership was absent just at the time when it was most needed. Further collapse occurred during 1947–1949, as many of the local mayors, judges, communal and religious officials fled. Palestinian society ... was semifeudal in character, and once the landlords and other leaders had made good their own escape—as they did from Haifa, Jaffa, Safed, and elsewhere—the Arab townspeople, villagers, and peasants were left helpless.

=== Second Stage: Israeli army victories and expulsions ===
After the start of the Israeli counteroffensive, Gelber considers the exodus to have been a result of Israeli army's victory and the expulsion of Palestinians. He writes, "The Arab expeditions failed to protect them, and they remained a constant reminder of the fiasco. These later refugees were sometimes literally deported across the lines. In certain cases, IDF units terrorized them to hasten their flight, and isolated massacres particularly during the liberation of Galilee and the Negev in October 1948 expedited the flight."

Morris also reports expulsions during these events. For example, concerning whether in Operation Hiram there was a comprehensive and explicit expulsion order he replied:

Yes. One of the revelations in the book is that on 31 October 1948, the commander of the Northern Front, Moshe Carmel, issued an order in writing to his units to expedite the removal of the Arab population. Carmel took this action immediately after a visit by Ben-Gurion to the Northern Command in Nazareth. There is no doubt in my mind that this order originated with Ben-Gurion. Just as the expulsion order for the city of Lod, which was signed by Yitzhak Rabin, was issued immediately after Ben-Gurion visited the headquarters of Operation Dani [July 1948].

Gelber also underlines that Palestinian Arabs had certainly in mind the opportunity they would have to return their home after the conflict and that this hope must have eased their flight: "When they ran away, the refugees were confident of their eventual repatriation at the end of hostilities. This term could mean a cease-fire, a truce, an armistice and, certainly, a peace agreement. The return of escapees had been customary in the Middle East's wars throughout the ages".

Historian Christopher Sykes saw the causes of the Arab flight similar to Gelber:

It can be said with a high degree of certainty that most of the time in the first half of 1948 the mass-exodus was the natural, thoughtless, pitiful movement of ignorant people who had been badly led and who in the day of trial found themselves forsaken by their leaders. Terror was the impulse, by hearsay most often, and sometimes through experience as in the Arab port of Jaffa which surrendered on the 12th of May and where the Irgunists, to quote Mr. John Marlowe, "embellished their Deir Yassin battle honours by an orgy of looting". But if the exodus was by and large an accident of war in the first stage, in the later stages it was consciously and mercilessly helped on by Jewish threats and aggression towards Arab populations.

Karsh views the second stage as being "dictated predominantly by ad hoc military considerations (notably the need to deny strategic sites to the enemy if there were no available Jewish forces to hold them)".

== "Arab leaders' endorsement of flight" explanation ==
Israeli officials, sympathetic journalists, and some historians have claimed that the refugee flight was instigated by Arab leaders, though almost invariably no primary sources were cited. Since the 1980s, historians have increasingly dismissed the claim as devoid of evidence. The New Historians, such as Benny Morris, also concur that Arab instigation was not the major cause of the refugees' flight. They state that the major cause of Palestinian flight was instead military actions by the Israeli Defence Force and fear of those actions. In their view, Arab instigation can only explain a small part of the exodus.

=== Explanations that the flight was instigated or caused by Arab leaders ===
Yosef Weitz wrote in October 1948: "The migration of the Arabs from the Land of Israel was not caused by persecution, violence, expulsion ... [it was] a tactic of war on the part of the Arabs...." Israeli historian Efraim Karsh wrote, "The logic behind this policy was apparently that 'the absence of women and children from Palestine would free the men for fighting', as the Secretary-General of the Arab League, Abd al-Rahman Azzam put it." In his book, The Arab–Israeli Conflict: The Palestine War 1948, Karsh wrote that the Arab Higher Committee played a key part in the exoduses from Haifa, Tiberias, and Jaffa.

A 3 May 1948 Time magazine article attributed the exodus from the city of Haifa to fear, Arab orders to leave and a Jewish assault. The Economist attributed the exodus from Haifa to orders to leave from the Higher Arab Executive, but noted Jewish troops had expelled Palestinians from other regions. According to Childers, the journalist responsible for the article was not present in Haifa, and he reported as an eyewitness account what was second-hand. The article is only cited for this passage, though the same correspondent states therein that the second wave of destitute refugees were given an hour by Jewish troops to quit the areas. In what has become known as "The Spectator Correspondence", Hedley V. Cooke quote from Time Magazine (18 May 1961) "Mr, Ben-Gurion, the Israel [sic] Prime Minister... denied in the Knesset yesterday that a single Arab resident had been expelled by the Government since the establishment of the State of Israel and he said the pre-State Jewish underground had announced that any Arab would remain where he was. He said the fugitives had fled under the orders of Arab Leaders". In the same "Spectator Correspondence" (page 54), Jon Kimche wrote that "there is now a mountain of independent evidence to show that the initiative for the Arab exodus came from the Arab side and not from the Jews". In the same "Correspondence", the views of Ben-Gurion and Kimche are critiqued by Childers and Khalidi (see Criticisms of the "Arab leaders' endorsement of flight" explanation below)

In the case of the village of Ein Karem, William O. Douglas was told by the villagers that the cause of their flight was twofold: first, it was due to the fear caused by the Deir Yassin massacre; and second, it was because "the villagers were told by the Arab leaders to leave. It apparently was a strategy of mass evacuation, whether or not necessary as a military or public safety measure."

==== Statements by Arab leaders and organizations ====
Khalid al-Azm, who was prime minister of Syria from 17 December 1948 to 30 March 1949, listed in his memoirs a number of reasons for the Arab defeat in an attack on the Arab leaders including his own predecessor Jamil Mardam Bey:

Fifth: the Arab governments' invitation to the people of Palestine to flee from it and seek refuge in adjacent Arab countries, after terror had spread among their ranks in the wake of the Deir Yassin event. This mass flight has benefited the Jews and the situation stabilized in their favor without effort.... Since 1948 we have been demanding the return of the refugees to their homeland, while it is we who constrained them to leave it. Between the invitation extended to the refugees and the request to the United Nations to decide upon their return, there elapsed only a few months.

Jamal Husseini, Palestinian representative to the United Nations, told the UN on 9 August 1948 that 550,000 Palestine Arabs had been "forced to leave their towns and villages by the attacks and massacres carried on by the Jews." A few weeks later, in a letter to the Syrian UN representative, Husseini accused Amman [i.e. Transjordan] of ordering unnecessary military withdrawals, leaving the locals defenceless: "The regular armies did not enable the inhabitants of the country to defend themselves, but merely facilitated their escape from Palestine."

=== Criticisms of the "Arab leaders' endorsement of flight" explanation ===
Morris and Flapan have been among the authors whose research has disputed the official Israeli version claiming that the refugee flight was in large part instigated by Arab leaders. More evidence is presented by Walid Khalidi. In his article, Khalidi argues that steps were taken by Arab governments to prevent Palestinians from leaving, ensuring that they remain to fight, including the denial by Lebanon and Syria of residency permits to Palestinian males of military age on April 30 and May 6 respectively. He also notes that a number of Arab radio broadcasts urged the inhabitants of Palestine to remain and discussed plans for an Arab administration there.

Glazer (1980, p. 101) writes that not only did Arab radio stations appeal to the inhabitants not to leave, but also that Zionist radio stations urged the population to flee, by exaggerating the course of battle, and, in some cases, fabricating complete lies. According to Glazer (1980, p. 105), those who blame Arab news reports for the resulting panic flight include Polk et al. and Gabbay. They instead maintain that the Arabs overstated the case of Zionist atrocities, made the situation seem worse than it was and thus caused the population to flee. According to Glazer, Gabbay, in particular, has assembled an impressive listing of sources which describe Zionist cruelty and savagery. Glazer (1980, p. 105) cites the work done by Childers which maintains that it was the Zionists who disseminated these stories, at a time when Arab sources were urging calm. He cites carefully composed "horror recordings" in which a voice calls out in Arabic for the population to escape because "the Jews are using poison gas and atomic weapons". In the opinion of Glazer (1980, p. 108) one of the greatest weaknesses of the traditional Zionist argument—which attempts to explain the exodus as a careful, calculated and organized plan by various Arab authorities—is that it cannot account for the totally disorganized way in which the exodus occurred. As regards the evidence provided to support the idea that Arab leaders incited the flight of Palestinians, Glazer (1980, p. 106) states, "I am inclined to prefer Childers[' research] because the sources he cites would have reached the masses.... Gabbay's evidence, newspapers and UN documents, were designed for outside consumption, by diplomats and politicians abroad and by the educated and influential Arab decision makers. This is not the kind of material which would necessarily have been in the hands of the common Palestinian."

Flapan further maintains that to support their claim that Arab leaders had incited the flight, Israeli and Zionist sources were constantly "quoting" statements by the Arab Higher Committee to the effect that "in a very short time the armies of our Arab sister countries will overrun Palestine, attacking from the land, the sea, and the air, and they will settle accounts with the Jews." Though he accepts that some such statements were issued, he believes they were intended to stop the panic that was causing the masses to abandon their villages and that they were issued as a warning to the increasing number of Arabs who were willing to accept partition as irreversible and cease struggling against it. From his point of view, in practice the AHC statements boomeranged and further increased Arab panic and flight. According to Aharon Cohen, head of Mapam's Arab department, the Arab leadership was very critical of the "fifth columnists and rumormongers" behind the flight. When, after April 1948, the flight acquired massive dimensions, Azzam Pasha, secretary of the Arab League, and King 'Abdailah both issued public calls to the Arabs not to leave their homes. Fawzi al-Qawuqji, commander of the Arab Liberation Army, was given instructions to stop the flight by force and to requisition transport for this purpose. Muhammad Adib al-'Umri, deputy director of the Ramallah broadcasting station, appealed to the Arabs to stop the flight from Janin, Tulkarm, and other towns in the Triangle that were bombed by the Israelis. On 10 May, on its Arab program, Radio Jerusalem broadcast orders from Arab commanders and the AHC to stop the mass flight from Jerusalem and its vicinity. Flapan considers that Palestinian sources offer further evidence that even earlier, in March and April, the Arab Higher Committee broadcasting from Damascus demanded that the population stay put and announced that Palestinians of military age were to return from the Arab countries. All Arab officials in Palestine were also asked to remain at their posts The author claims that such pleas had so little impact because they were outweighed by the cumulative effect of Zionist pressure tactics that ranged from economic and psychological warfare to the systematic ousting of the Arab population by the army.

According to Flapan the idea that Arab leaders ordered the Arab masses to leave their homes in order to open the way for the invading armies, after which they would return to share in the victory, makes no sense at all. In his opinion, the Arab armies, coming long distances and operating in or from the Arab areas of Palestine, needed the help of the local population for food, fuel, water, transport, manpower, and information. The author cites a report of the Jewish Agency's Arab section from 3 January 1948, at the beginning of the flight, which in his view suggests the Arabs were already concerned with the possibility of flight: "The Arab exodus from Palestine continues, mainly to the countries of the West. Of late, the Arab Higher Executive has succeeded in imposing close scrutiny on those leaving for Arab countries in the Middle East". Flapan maintains that prior to the declaration of statehood, the Arab League's political committee, meeting in Sofar, Lebanon, recommended that the Arab states "open the doors to ... women and children and old people if events in Palestine make it necessary, but that the AHC vigorously opposed the departure of Palestinians and even the granting of visas to women and children. Christopher Hitchens also expressed doubt as to the validity of claims of orders to leave from the Higher Arab Executive.

=== Relative importance of Arab evacuation orders ===
Morris estimates that Arab orders account for, at most, 5% of the total exodus:

Arab officers ordered the complete evacuation of specific villages in certain areas, lest their inhabitants "treacherously" acquiesce in Israeli rule or hamper Arab military deployments.... There can be no exaggerating the importance of these early Arab-initiated evacuations in the demoralization, and eventual exodus, of the remaining rural and urban populations.

Based on his studies of 73 Israeli and foreign archives or other sources, Morris made a judgement as to the main causes for the Arab exodus from each of the 392 settlements that were depopulated during the 1948–1950 conflict (pages xiv to xviii). His tabulation lists "Arab orders" as being a significant "exodus factor" in only six of these settlements.

Furthermore, in his comprehensive book on the Arab–Israeli conflict, Righteous Victims, Morris wrote:

In some areas Arab commanders ordered the villagers to evacuate to clear the ground for military purposes or to prevent surrender. More than half a dozen villages ... were abandoned during these months as a result of such orders. Elsewhere, in East Jerusalem and in many villages around the country, the [Arab] commanders ordered women, old people, and children to be sent away to be out of harm's way.... [T]he AHC and the Arab League had periodically endorsed such a move when contemplating the future war in Palestine.

In a 2003 interview with Haaretz, Morris summed up the conclusions of his revised edition of The Birth of the Palestinian Refugee Problem: "In the months of April–May 1948, units of the Haganah were given operational orders that stated explicitly that they were to uproot the villagers, expel them and destroy the villages themselves. At the same time, it turns out that there was a series of orders issued by the Arab Higher Committee and by the Palestinian intermediate levels to remove children, women and the elderly from the villages."

The Arab National Committee in Jerusalem, following the 8 March 1948 instructions of the Arab Higher Committee, ordered women, children and the elderly in various parts of Jerusalem to leave their homes and move to areas "far away from the dangers. Any opposition to this order ... is an obstacle to the holy war ... and will hamper the operations of the fighters in these districts."

In a 1959 paper, Walid Khalidi attributed the "Arab evacuation story" to Joseph Schechtman, who wrote two 1949 pamphlets in which "the evacuation order first makes an elaborate appearance." Morris, too, did not find any blanket orders of evacuation.
