= 1948: A History of the First Arab–Israeli War =

Book by Benny Morris

- First edition hardcover image
- Author: Benny Morris

1948: A History of the First Arab–Israeli War is a non-fiction work written by Israeli historian Benny Morris. It was published by Yale University Press in 2008. The author is otherwise known for multiple other books such as Birth of the Palestinian Refugee Problem and Righteous Victims, being a member of the group called the 'new historians' and the individual who most popularized the term.

== Background and contents ==
The author remarked in an interview, "The left wing and the right wing will both find things to attack in the book". He added "Anyone who wants can find things to bash the Arabs with" and "anyone who wants can find things to bash the Jews with", given that the "book has everything in it, because that's the nature of history: it is really quite intricate."

The book details the 1947–1949 Palestine war from a primarily military perspective, though wading into the numerous complex cultural, political, and social issues involved. The 1948 Palestinian expulsion and flight from various areas as well as the latter Arab–Israeli conflict are delved into in the context of the initial fighting. Morris describes a multi-faceted struggle in which numerous war crimes occur, many committed by Jewish forces despite later apologia attempting to minimize such events. He writes, "In truth ... the Jews committed far more atrocities than the Arabs and killed far more civilians and POWs in deliberate acts of brutality in the course of 1948. This was probably due to the circumstances that the victorious Israelis captured some four hundred Arab villages ... whereas the Palestinian Arabs and [foreign volunteers] failed to take any settlements and the Arab armies ... overran fewer than a dozen Jewish settlements."

The character of the Arabic forces assaulting the Jewish communities is also described as having a highly ideological, Islamist nature. Morris views the 1948 bloodshed as having a broader sense of having a conflict between civilizations, with many soldiers seeing themselves as engaging in 'jihad'. However, he states that the disorganized, divided leadership of the Arabic forces provided military opportunities from their own ineptness that the Jewish militias seized. Avi Shlaim interpreted these factors in the book as going a "long way towards explaining their defeat on the battlefield." However, the start of Morris' book has a poem referencing David versus Goliath. It was written in 1947 before the start of the war and includes the lines "Suppose, this time, Goliath should not fail; ... The psalm is stilled, and David does not win." Morris does not explain why he included the poem, leaving the reader to decide for themselves.

== Reviews and responses ==
The Guardian published a supportive review by fellow historian Avi Shlaim. He wrote, "Morris subjects the conflicting national narratives of the 1948 war to rigorous scrutiny in the light of the evidence and he discards all the notions, however deeply cherished, that do not stand up to such scrutiny." While criticizing some of Morris' arguments, Shlaim praised the book as an "impressive achievement of original research and synthesis" and concluded that it provided a historical account "presented in a fluent and readable style".

An article published in the Middle East Quarterly interviewing the author and discussing the work stated that in 1948: History of the First Arab–Israeli War "even when difficult facts come up, Morris tries to preserve balance and composure."

The Independent published a review by Stephen Howe, a historian and frequent reviewer, that observed a marked change in Morris’ perspective starting at the beginning of the 2000s. While calling the book an "impressively exhaustive narrative of the war's military campaigns and political backdrop," Howe also observes that Morris's attitude toward the Palestinians is considerably more negative, and is also critical of Morris's attribution of a "'jihadist' mentality" to the Palestinians without his providing sufficient historical evidence to support this view.

Motti Golan, professor of Jewish History at The Zvi Yavetz School of Historical Studies at the University of Tel Aviv, published a review in the Journal of Israeli History that praised Morris's book as "an important contribution to the literature on the history of the 1948 war and is an essential source for students, instructors, and researchers alike"; among several more modest criticisms, Golan took issue with Morris's claims about the importance of the Islamic principle of Jihad to the Arab side of the war, claims Golan views as anachronistic and misguided.

Writing in Haaretz, a fellow 'new historian', Tom Segev, gave Morris’ work a highly critical review, noting a particular lack of humanism displayed in the book's treatment of the Palestinian perspective:

“Morris’ obliviousness to the story of the people behind the documents he quotes is also revealed by an almost complete avoidance of describing the suffering of the refugees. It seems that in his opinion at least some of them, especially the residents of Lyd and Ramleh, should have been grateful for the expulsion.”

Writing in The New York Times, journalist David Margolick praised Morris’s book as "an authoritative and fair-minded account of an epochal and volatile event," saying that Morris "has reconstructed that event with scrupulous exactitude"; on the other hand, Margolick criticized the book's style, saying that it "can be exasperatingly tedious" and that "the narrative cries out for air and anecdote and color."

Yoav Gelber has praised Morris's 2008 book on the origins of the 1948 Israeli-Arab war, stating that "In general, however, 1948 is a praiseworthy achievement of research and analysis, the work of a historian unwilling to rest on his already considerable laurels." On the other hand, Gelber criticised Morris for granting too much importance to the militant Islamic rhetoric of the period.

== Awards ==
- 2008: National Jewish Book Award in the History category

== See also ==
- 2008 in literature
- Arab–Israeli conflict
- Army of Shadows: Palestinian Collaboration with Zionism, 1917–1948
- The Ethnic Cleansing of Palestine
- History of Israel
- 1947–1949 Palestine war
- Palestinian exodus of 1948
  - Causes of the 1948 Palestinian exodus
- Palestinian refugees
