= 1948 and After =

1990 collection of essays by Benny Morris

- Book cover, 1994 edition
- Author: Benny Morris
- Language: English
- Publisher: Clarendon Press
- Publication date: 1990, 1st ed., 1994, revised ed.
- ISBN: 978-0198279297

1948 and After: Israel and the Palestinians is a collection of essays by the Israeli historian Benny Morris. The book was first published in hardcover in 1990. It was revised/expanded (largely on the basis of newly available material) and published by Clarendon Press, Oxford, in 1994, ISBN 0-19-827929-9.

The expanded 1994 edition contained a complete new chapter (ch. 5): Yosef Nahmani and the Arab Question in 1948. Chapters 1 (The new historiography: Israel and its past) and chapter 10 (The Transfer of Al Majdal's Remaining Arabs to Gaza, 1950) were substantially expanded.

== Detailed synopsis ==
=== The new historiography: Israel and its past ===
In the first chapter, Morris outlines his refutation of the single-cause thesis to the Palestinian exodus. On p. 31, he writes: "In refuting Teveth's single-cause ("Arab orders") explanation of the exodus up to 15 May, I pointed out that there is simply no evidence to support it, and that the single document Teveth is able to cite, the Haganah report of 24 April, refers explicitly to "rumours" and to an order to "several localities" (rather than a blanket order to "the Arabs of Palestine"). Moreover, neither these "rumours" nor the purported order were referred to again in any subsequent Haganah intelligence report (which surely would have been the case had these "rumours" been confirmed and had an actual order been picked up). The fact is that the opposite occurred: Haganah intelligence and Western diplomatic missions in the Middle East at the time, around 5–6 May 1948, picked up, recorded and quoted from Arab orders and appeals (by King Abdullah I, Arab Liberation Army Commander Fawzi Qawuqji, and Damascus Radio) to the Arabs of Palestine to stay put in their homes or, if already in exile, to return to Palestine. Not evidence of "Arab orders" to flee but of orders to stay put during those crucial pre-invasion weeks. It flies in the face of the chronology, which there is no getting around. There was an almost universal one-to-one correspondence between Jewish attacks in specific localities and on specific towns and Arab flight from these localities and towns;

- Tiberias was attacked by the Golani Brigade on 17 April; its Arab population evacuated on 18 April.
- Arab Haifa was attacked and defeated on 21–22 April; most of its 70,000 Arab inhabitants, evacuated the city over 22 April – 1 May.
- Jaffa was assaulted by the Irgun Zva'i Leumi on 25–27 April; the bulk of its 70,000–80,000 population fled the city between 25 April and 13 May.
- Safad was attacked and conquered by the Palmah on 9–10 May; its Arab population of 10,000 fled the city on 10 May.
- Eastern Galilee was conquered by Palmah units between 2 May and 25 May; the villages in the area decamped during that period. And so on."

(p.32): "What this means is that Haganah / Irgun / IDF attack was usually the principal and final precipitant of Arab flight.... For if the Arab order/orders had been issued on 10 April, why did the inhabitants of Haifa wait a fortnight, and those of Safad or Eastern Galilee a month or more to depart? And if the order was issued, say, on 25 April, why did the inhabitants of Tiberias depart three days before; or those of Safad wait a further fortnight before leaving?"

=== Mapai, Mapam, and the Arab problem in 1948 ===
Here Morris examines the evolving attitudes to "the Arab problem" as it appeared in the two dominant parties, Mapam and Mapai in 1948. Of the minor parties only the Revisionists spoke with a clear voice. (p. 51:) On 13 May LHI declared:

A strong attack on the centres of the Arab population will intensify the movement of refugees and all the roads in the direction of Transjordan and the neighbouring countries will be filled with panic-stricken masses and [this] will hamper the [enemy's] military movement, as happened during the collapse of France [in World War II] ... A great opportunity has been given us.... The whole of this land is ours....

==== (p. 53): Mapai ====
Morris examines the "paper trail" on the "Arab question", and writes that the most striking thing about Mapai is that the party—according to the "paper trail"—hardly ever discussed it.

The first to break the silence was Golda Meir, who, after a visit to the deserted Arab quarters of Haifa argued on 11 May that the party now had to determine Israeli behaviour towards the Arabs that remained. Her calls for a full-scale party debate on the issue was not heeded. Morris writes (p. 55): "It was as if a large stone had been thrown into a pool—but had caused no ripple at all." The only full-scale Mapai party debate in 1948 took place 24 July. Some quotes from that debate:

(p. 57) According to David Ben-Gurion, two things had surprised him during the war: the Arab flight and Jewish looting. "It emerged that most of the Jews are thieves". Everyone stole and looted, including "the men of the [Jezreel] Valley, the cream of the pioneers, the parents of the Palmah [fighters]".

Shlomo Lavi, a veteran of the kibbutz movement said: "the.. . transfer out of the country in my eyes is one of the most just, moral and correct things that can be done. I have thought this ... for many years."

(p. 57–58:) Avraham Katznelson endorsed the view: there is nothing "more moral, from the viewpoint of universal human ethics, than the emptying of the Jewish State of the Arabs and their transfer elsewhere.... This requires [the use of] force."

During that meeting Shertok stated: "It is desirable for us that the Arabs do not return, if it is at all possible ... [This has] historical justification.' It is best for Israel and the Arab states in the long run that Israel should not have internal problems stemming from the existence of a large Arab minority, he implied. Shertok said, however, that he did not think the hour was ripe for this position 'to be formulated outwardly [that is, publicly]'. (p. 58)

==== (p. 58): Mapam ====
(p. 59–61): Aharon Cohen, leader of the Mapam's Arab department wrote a memorandum called: "Our Arab Policy in the Midst of the War", 10 May. In his notes for the memorandum, penned 6 May 1948, he wrote: "a deliberate eviction [of the Arabs] is taking place.... Others may rejoice—I, as a socialist, am ashamed and afraid.... To win the war and lose the peace ... the state [of Israel], when it arises, will live on its sword." In the memorandum, he wrote: "... out of certain political goals and not only out of military necessity' the Arabs were driven out. "In practice, a ... "transfer" of the Arabs out of the area of the Jewish state was being carried out', and this would eventually redound against the Yishuv, both militarily (by increasing pan-Arab anger) and politically. (p. 66): Cohen had charged that "it had depended on us whether the Arabs stayed or fled ... [They had fled] and this was [the implementation of] Ben-Gurion's line in which our comrades are [also] active""
(p. 64): Ya'acov Hazan, a Kibbutz Artzi leader specifically denounced the way the Haganah had treated the Arabs who had stayed put. In Abu Shusha, a village near his home kibbutz, the Haganah had completely bulldozed the village, instead of distinguishing between houses belonging to friends and houses belonging to foes of the Yishuv. He spoke of Haganah "killing, robbery, rape. I don't think our army should be like any army."
(p. 65): Mapam co-leader Ya'ari, 14 June: "In truth, thousands [of Palestinians] did flee, but not always of their own will. There were shameful episodes.... There was no necessity for all the villages to be emptied..." "

=== Analysis of June 1948 IDF report ===
This article was first published in Middle Eastern Studies, January 1986.

Much of this article deals with Morris' explication and interpretation of a document found in 1985 in the papers of Aharon Cohen called "The Emigration of the Arabs of Palestine in the Period 1/12/1947 – 1/6/1948" that had been produced by Israeli Defence Forces Intelligence Service sometime during the first truce.

The report is dated June 30, 1948, and consists of two parts: a 9-page text and a 15-page appendix. Morris explains that the details in the appendix serve as a basis for the statistical breakdown in the text.

The author is assumed to be Moshe Sasson, assistant to the director of the Arab Department in the Intelligence Service. (He was later Israel's ambassador to Italy and Egypt.)

==== Content ====
According to the report, Morris tells that, on the eve of the UN Partition Plan Resolution of 29 November 1947, there were 219 Arab villages and four Arab, or partly Arab, towns in the areas earmarked by the Resolution to be part of the Jewish state, with a total Arab population of 342,000. By 1 June 1948, 180 of these villages and towns had been evacuated, with 239,000 Arabs fleeing the areas of the Jewish state.

In addition, 152,000 Arabs had fled from areas that had been designated for Palestinian Arab statehood by the Partition Plan. According to the report, the total number of refugees was 391,000 by 1 June 1948, plus or minus 10–15%. Some 103,000 Arabs were said to have remained in the area designated for Jewish statehood.

The report identifies four stages in the exodus, of which stage four, in May 1948, was defined as the 'main and decisive stage in the emigration movement of the Arabs of Palestine. A psychosis of emigration began to develop, a crisis in confidence in Arab strength."

The report concludes: "It is possible to say that at least 55% of the total of the exodus was caused by our [Haganah / IDF] operations and by their influence". In addition, "the effects of the operations of dissident Jewish organizations 'directly [caused] some 15 percent ... of the emigration'.

Morris notes that the report points out that where there was a "strong Arab military force" the villagers did not evacuate "readily." He notes that the report says that the "Arab institutions attempted to struggle against the phenomenon of flight and evacuation, and to curb the waves of emigration.... Especially, they tried to prevent the exodus of youngsters of military age.... But all these actions completely failed because no positive action was taken which could have curbed the factors pushing toward emigration."

Morris writes:

"...the reports goes out of its way to stress that the exodus was contrary to the political-strategic desires of both the Arab Higher Committee and the governments of the neighbouring Arab states" [] "...the report makes no mention of any blanket order issued over Arab radio stations or through other means to Palestinians to evacuate their homes or villages. Had such an order been issued, it would without doubt have been mentioned or cited in this document; the Haganah intelligence service and the IDF intelligence branch closely monitored Arab radio transmissions and the Arabic press.

... from it [the report] emerges a very definite impression that the depopulation of the villages and towns was an unexpected outcome of operations the purpose of which was wholly or primarily the conquest of military positions and strategic sites in the course of a life-and-death struggle. Jewish military operations indeed accounted for 70 percent of the Arab exodus; but the depopulation of the villages in most cases was an incidental, if favourably regarded, side-effect of these operations, not their aim....

But for an understanding of the Palestinian exodus until 1 June, one must, according to IDF Intelligence Branch, reach mainly for the vast middle ground between preplanned, outright IDF expulsion and Arab-engineered, Machiavellian flight. There, amid the frightening, threatening boom of guns, the loss of confidence in Arab might, the flight of relatives and friends, the abandonment of nearby towns, and a general, vast fear of the uncharted future, one will find the bulk of the pre-June Palestinian refugees."

=== Yosef Weitz and the Transfer Committees, 1948–1949 ===
This article was first published in Middle Eastern Studies in 1986.

Yosef Weitz was the director of Jewish National Fund's Land Department, who from the 1930s was responsible for land acquisition (mostly from Arabs) for the Yishuv. He was instrumental in establishing the "Transfer Committees".

=== The case of Abu Ghosh and Beit Naqquba, Al Fureidis and Jisr Zarka in 1948 ===
==== Abu Ghosh ====
The villagers of Abu Ghosh had first been expelled in 1948, but the bulk of the inhabitants "infiltrated" back home in the following months and years. In the second half of 1949, the IDF and police started to descend on Abu Ghosh in a series of more or less brutal search-and-expel operations, where they rounded up the most recent "infiltrators" and pushed them over the border into Jordan. (p. 267–268): Following one such round-up, in early 1950, the inhabitants of Abu Gosh sent off an "open letter", to Knesset members and journalists, writing that the Israelis had repeatedly

"surrounded our village, and taken our women, children and old folk, and thrown them over the border and into the Negev Desert, and many of them died in consequence, when they were shot [trying to make their way back across] the borders".

So far, the inhabitants had held their peace.

"But we cannot remain silent in face of the latest incident last Friday, when we woke up to the shouts blaring over the loudspeaker announcing that the village was surrounded and anyone trying to get out would be shot.... The police and military forces then began to enter the houses and conduct meticulous searches, but no contraband was found. In the end, using force and blows, they gathered up our women, and old folk and children, the sick and the blind and pregnant women. These shouted for help but there was no saviour. And we looked on and were powerless to do anything save beg for mercy. Alas, our pleas were of no avail... They then took the prisoners, who were weeping and screaming, to an unknown place, and we still do not know what befell them."

Partly due to public outcry, most of the inhabitants were allowed home. Morris writes (p. 269): In the end only several dozen Abu Gosh families remained in exile, as refugees, in the Ramallah area in the West Bank.

==== Beit Naqquba ====
About Beit Naqquba, Morris writes (p. 263): "It is possible that the inhabitants of Beit Naqquba had received both an order to evacuate from Arab military commanders in Ein Karim and "strong advice" to the same effect from Lisser and Navon. But it is likely that the "advice" given in the name of the Harel Brigade, which physically controlled the area, was the more potent of the two factors in precipitating the evacuation."

Between 1948 and 1964 the (by then former) inhabitants of Bayt Naqquba at first lived at Sataf, "under trees, because the Arabs had not allowed them to come over their lines, out of distrust and revenge" (quoted in Morris, p. 264). Afterwards they were allowed to stay temporarily in Abu Ghosh.

(p. 266): The reason given for why they were not allowed to return was given as "security" by the local kibbutz Kiryat Anavim. However, Kiryat Anavim's opposition to the return of Beit Naqquba refugees to their village was only in part based on "security" considerations. The kibbutz also wanted Beit Naqquba's land. The problem was that the handful of Beit Naqquba refugees now living in Abu Gosh continued to cultivate their lands, "and it is to be assumed that they look forward to the day on which they will be able to return to their homes. It seems that as long as the Beit Naqquba inhabitants remain near their abandoned village, they will continue to maintain contact with the village, and the members of Kiryat Anavim will not be able to take over and cultivate the village lands." Reporting this, (on 16 March 1949), the Interior Ministry official responsible for the Jerusalem District recommended that the Beit Naqquba villagers residing in Abu Ghosh be moved "somewhere ... far away".

Starting in 1964, the former Bayt Naqquba residents started moving to a new site, called "Ein Naqquba", located on some of their land south of the Jerusalem–Tel Aviv highway.

=== The transfer of Al Majdal's Remaining Arabs to Gaza, 1950 ===
Morris examined previously unpublished reports and memorandums pertaining to the transfer of Majdal's Arabs to Gaza in 1950. The reports/memorandums were mostly in the Israel State Archive, Foreign Ministry (=ISA, FM) and the Labour Archives (Histadrut), Lavon Institute, Tel Aviv (=LA).

(p. 337–338): "At the beginning of September, Major V. H. Loriaux, a UN truce-observer and sometime acting chairman of the Israel–Egypt MAC (=Mixed Armistice Commission), interviewed some of the evacuees shortly after they reached the Gaza strip. He was told the Majdal Arabs, soon after being warned that they would shortly have to leave the town, were charged '1,650 Israeli pound[s] for drinking water (it was free of charge previously)'. Loriaux was also told of 'delays'—before September—in the distribution of rations. The Arabs [...] had been penned in their ghetto, behind barbed wire and military checkpoints, and were rarely allowed out." (ISA-FM 2436/5bet.) Loriaux [...] complained that there had been cases were Arabs who had refused to move to Gaza being jailed. Israel denied this. (ISA FM 2436/5bet.)

(p. 338): UNTSO chairman General William Riley wrote [...]: "A. Since occupation of Majdal by Israel, Arabs are kept in special quarters. B. Shopkeepers are not allowed to renew stock. C. Proprietors are not allowed to enter their houses, lands or groves. D. Arab rations are inferior to Israeli rations. E. Rumours are spread among Arabs that Majdal will become military [i.e. war] zone. F. Many Arabs wished to stay, but found living conditions impossible through continuous vexations' (see UN Archives, New York), (DAG-1/2.2.5.2.0-1, 13 Sept. 1950)

(p. 441): UNTSO chief of staff, Lieutenant-General William Riley, United States Marine Corps, on 21 September issued an unusual public condemnation of the ongoing expulsion of Majdals Arabs and the simultaneous expulsion of members (4000 according to the UN) of the Azazme beduin tribe from the Negev into Sinai. Israel reacted by denying both counts. On 17 November 1950 the Security Council condemned Israel on both counts (Resolution 89: The Palestine Question (17 Nov)) and on 30 May 1951 the MAC called on Israel to repatriate the 1950 Majdal transferees. Israel rejected the decision and denied the charge.

(p. 345) Morris concludes:

Majdal officially became Ashkelon in 1956, after passing through some nominal stations—Migdal-Gad and Migdal-Ashkelon. The three-sided (Israel, Egypt and UN) debate over whether the Arab departure had been "voluntary" or "coerced" by then was something of an irrelevance. The UN calls for a return 1950 was never heeded and the Majdal transferees were fated to linger on, for decades, indefinitely, in Gaza's grim, grimy refugee camps. What is clear is that after a year and a half of bureaucratic foot-dragging, the IDF in 1950 wanted this last concentration of Arabs in the southern coastal plain to leave, and engineered their departure.. The Majdal Arabs' own uneasiness at life as a ghettoized minority, under military rule, hemmed in by barbed wire and a pass system, dependent on Israeli handouts, largely unemployed and destitute, cut off from their relatives in Gaza and from the Arab world in general, served as a preparatory background. [...] When these [methods] proved insufficient with the remaining hard-core Histadrut-protected inhabitants, the army availed itself, in September and early October, of cruder methods—shooting in the night, threatening behaviour by the soldiery, unpleasant early-hour-of-the-morning visitations, frequent summons, and occasional arrests. The use of these methods was hidden from the Israeli public and, probably, lacked Cabinet authorization. To sweeten the pill, the military government offered some fulsome carrots in the form of financial incentives [...] Until Israel's Defence Ministry and Cabinet records are opened, the exact decision-making processes behind the Majdal transfer will remain unclear.

== See also ==
- Causes of the 1948 Palestinian exodus
