= Avraham Sela =

Israeli political scientist (born 1945)

Avraham Sela (Hebrew: אברהם סלע) is an Israeli historian and scholar on the Middle East and international relations.

== Education and career ==
Sela studied at the Hebrew University of Jerusalem, gaining a BA in 1971, an MA in 1974 and a PhD in 1986. He currently serves as the A. Ephraim and Shirley Diamond Professor of International Relations and a senior research fellow at the Harry S. Truman Institute, both at the Hebrew University.

He is the author of The Decline of the Arab Israeli Conflict: Middle East Politics and the Quest for Regional Order (1998) and co-author of The Palestinian Hamas: Vision, Violence and Adjustment (2000).

== Views ==
Sela is critical of the writings of the New Historians, particularly of Benny Morris and Avi Shlaim.

== Publications ==
- Unity Within Conflict in the Inter-Arab System: The Arab Summit Conferences, 1964–1982 (Magnes Press, 1983) (Hebrew)
- The Palestinian Ba'ath: The Arab Ba'ath Socialist Party in the West Bank under Jordan (1948–1967) (Magnes Press, 1984) (Hebrew)
- The PLO and Israel: From Armed Struggle to Political Settlement (St. Martin's Press, 1997, editor)
- The Decline of the Arab-Israeli Conflict: Middle East Politics and the Quest for Regional Order (SUNY Press, 1998)
- The Palestinian Hamas: Vision, Violence and Coexistence (New York: Columbia University Press, 2000), 2nd Edition (Columbia University Press, 2006),
- The Continuum Political Encyclopedia of the Middle East (Continuum, 2002).
