= Joseph Schechtman =

- Йосиф Шехтман
- Born: Joseph Boris (Ber) Schechtman; September 6, 1891; Odessa, Russian Empire (now Ukraine)
- Died: March 1, 1970 (aged 78); New York City, United States
- Education: Novorossia Imperial University, Humboldt University of Berlin
- Occupations: Historian, writer, zionist activist
- Organization: Zionist Organization
- Known for: Books on Zionism, Jewish history, and population migration
- Notable work: The Arab Refugee Problem; The Mufti and the Fuehrer; European Population Transfers, 1939–1945; The Vladimir Jabotinsky Story
- Movement: Revisionist Zionism
- Spouse: Rachel Davidson
- Children: 3

Joseph Schechtman (Russian: Иосиф Шехтман, romanized: Iosif Shekhtman, Russian pronunciation: [ˈiːɐsʲɪf ˈʂextmən]; September 6, 1891 – March 1, 1970) was a Russian-born Revisionist Zionist activist, historian, and author. He played a significant role in the establishment of the World Union of Revisionist Zionists and the New Zionist Organization alongside Ze'ev Jabotinsky. Schechtman authored numerous works on Jewish history, Zionism, and population migrations, including The Arab Refugee Problem and European Population Transfers, 1939–1945. His studies on population transfers, described as "pioneering" in defining guidelines for such movements, have been both influential and controversial. He emigrated to the United States during World War II, continuing his advocacy and scholarship while working with organizations such as the Jewish Agency for Israel and the Office of Strategic Services (OSS).

== Biography ==
=== Early life and education ===
Joseph Boris (Ber) Schechtman was born in Odessa, part of the Russian Empire (now Ukraine). During his involvement in the Zionist youth movement, he met Ze'ev Jabotinsky.

Schechtman studied at Novorossia Imperial University in Odessa. There he established contacts with members of the Ukrainian national movement. In 1910 he published an article in the journal "Еврейский мир" (Jewish World) in St. Petersburg, calling for Ukrainian-Jewish dialogue. In 1917, back in Odessa, he published pamphlets «Евреи и украинцы» (Jews and Ukrainians) and «Национальные движения в свободной России» (National Movements in the Free Russia).

=== Zionist activism ===
In May 1917, Schechtman was a delegate to the Seventh All-Russian Conference of Zionists that took place in Petrograd and to the All-Russian Jewish Congress that took place in Moscow during June–July 1918. In 1918 he was elected to the Jewish National Council of Ukraine. In 1918–1919 he worked in its executive agency, Jewish National Secretariat.

In 1920 Schechtman left Bolshevik Russia. He entered Berlin University, and actively participated in the Federation of Russian-Ukrainian Zionists. From September 1922 he co-edited weekly Russian-language "Рассвет" (The Dawn) with Jabotinsky.

Schechtman was one of the founders of the World Union of Revisionist Zionism (Paris, 1925). In 1929–1931 he was the editor of Yiddish weekly "Der Noyer Veg" (The New Way) in Paris. From 1931 to 1935 Schechtman was a member of the executive committee of the Zionist Organization (WZO), when both he and Jabotinsky left the ZO to co-found the New Zionist Organization.

=== Emigration to the U.S. ===
Schechtman emigrated to the United States in the summer of 1941, and soon became part of the 'inner circle' of the New Zionist Organization of America (NZOA). In 1941–1943 he worked at YIVO. In 1943–1944 he was the director of Bureau for Study of Population Migration which he co-founded earlier. In 1944–1945 he worked as a consultant on questions of the migration of the Office of Strategic Services (OSS).

Schechtman was the chairman of the Association of American Zionists-Revisionists. In 1946, New Zionist Organization self-liquidated to rejoin the WZO. Schechtman served as a member of the executive committee of the WZO until 1970. In 1963–1965 and 1966–1968 he was a member of the executive committee of the Jewish Agency for Israel.

=== Writings and scholarship ===
Schechtman became a close associate and secretary to Ze'ev Jabotinsky, and would later write the two-volume biography of his life. Schectman wrote numerous books and articles dedicated to Jewish and world history, human migrations, population transfer and refugee issues.

In later years he also wrote a biography of the late Mufti of Jerusalem, Haj Amin el-Husseini.

In his 1961 book Star in Eclipse: Russian Jewry Revisited, he provided an account of the Babi Yar tragedy.

Schechtman early established his reputation as a pioneer and authority on changing population movements in the world and population transfers.

Schechtman was the "first to establish basic guidelines for successful transfers and to argue persuasively that transfers should be treated as preventative measures not punitive."

His work on the Palestinian refugee problem was heavily criticised by Erskine Childers and Steven Glazer for allegedly misquoting, carefully selecting words, and taking statements out of context to fit his narrative.

Walid Khalidi argued that Schechtman was "almost certainly" responsible for drafting two anonymous 1949 pamphlets for the Israel Information Center, where the narrative that Palestinians fled in 1948 due to Arab evacuation broadcasts first appeared. Schechtman later incorporated this version into his 1952 book, The Arab Refugee Problem, a position Khalidi regards as groundless.

== Published works ==
- Jews in German-occupied Soviet Territory. New York: Union of Russian Jews. 1944.
- European Population Transfers, 1939–1945. New York: Oxford University Press. 1946. OCLC 229926.
- The Elimination of German Minorities in Southeastern Europe. N.p. 1946.
- Population Transfers in Asia. New York: Hallsby Press. 1949. OCLC 502265.
- The Arab Refugee Problem. New York: Philosophical Library. 1952.
- Minorities in the Arab World. Washington. 1953.
- The Vladimir Jabotinsky Story. 2 volumes. New York: T. Yoseloff. 1956. OCLC 2661192.
- On Wings of Eagles: The Plight, Exodus, and Homecoming of Oriental Jewry. New York: T. Yoseloff. 1961. ISBN 0935437185. OCLC 1549405.
- Fighter and Prophet: The Vladimir Jabotinsky Story: The Last Years. New York: Yoseloff. 1961.
- Star in Eclipse: Russian Jewry Revisited. New York: T. Yoseloff. 1961.
- Postwar Population Transfers in Europe: 1945–1955. Philadelphia, Pa: University of Pennsylvania Press. 1962. OCLC 248807362.
- Postwar Population Transfers in Europe, 1945–1955. Philadelphia: University of Pennsylvania Press. 1963. OCLC 16738401.
- The Refugees in the World: Displacement and Integration. New York: Barnes. 1964. OCLC 487032.
- Fact Sheet on Arab Refugees. New York: Information Dept., The Jewish Agency – American Section Inc. 1964.
- The Mufti and the Fuehrer: The Rise and Fall of Haj Amin el-Husseini. New York: T. Yoseloff. 1965. OCLC 721185.
- Zionism and Zionists in Soviet Russia: Greatness and Drama. [New York]: Zionist Organization of America. 1966. OCLC 894684.
- The United States and the Jewish State Movement: The Crucial Decade, 1939–1949. New York: Herzl Press. 1966. OCLC 905103.
- Jordan: A State That Never Was. New York: Cultural Pub. Co. 1968.
- Arab Terror: Blueprint for Political Murder. New York: Zionist Organization of America. 1969. OCLC 296914.
- Israel Explodes Dir Yassin Blood Libel. New York, N.Y.: United Zionists Revisionists of America. 1969.
- History of the Revisionist Movement. with Yehuda Benari. Tel-Aviv: Hadar. 1970.
- European Population Transfers, 1939–1945. New York: Russell & Russell. 1971.
