= Simha Flapan =

Israeli historian and politician

- שמחה פלפן
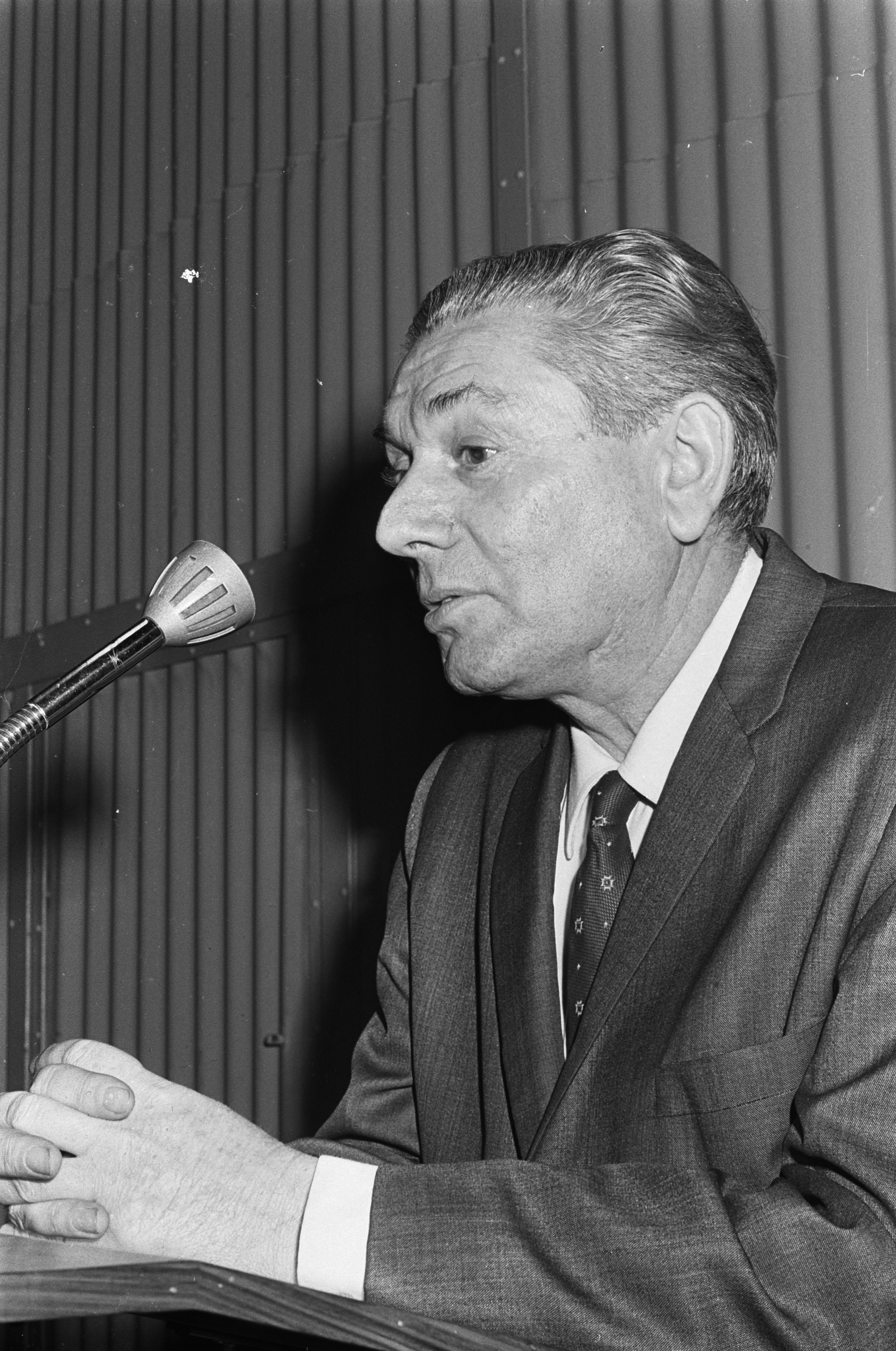
- Flapan in 1967
- Born: 27 January 1911; Tomaszów Mazowiecki, Congress Poland
- Died: 13 April 1987 (aged 76); Israel
- Occupations: Historian; politician
- Political party: Mapam
- Movement: Israel's "New Historians"

Simha Flapan (Hebrew: שמחה פלפן; 27 January 1911 – 13 April 1987) was an Israeli historian and politician. He is known for his book The Birth of Israel: Myths And Realities, published in the year of his death.

== Biography ==
Simha Flapan was born in Tomaszów Mazowiecki, Congress Poland. He died on 13 April 1987 in Israel.

== Political activism ==
Flapan was National Secretary of the left-wing Zionist Mapam party, and the director of its Arab Affairs department from 1959 to the mid-1970s; he also edited New Outlook magazine—a non-party monthly that promoted Arab-Jewish rapprochement.

== Views and opinions ==
Flapan was one of the New Historians, a term coined by Benny Morris in the 1980s. In the preface to Zionism and the Palestinians (1979), Flapan writes:

To dispel misunderstanding, I want to make it clear that my belief in the moral justification and historical necessity of Zionism remains unaffected by my critical reappraisal of the Zionist leadership. The history of Zionism demonstrates the extent to which the urge to create a new society, embodying the universal values of democracy and social justice, was inherent in the Zionist movement and responsible for its progress in adverse conditions. Israel's problem today lies in the disintegration of these values, due largely to the intoxication with military success and the belief that military superiority is a substitute for peace. Unless the liberal and progressive values of Zionism are restored and Palestinian rights to self-determination within a framework of peaceful coexistence are recognised, Israel's search for peace is doomed to failure. I firmly believe that these trends will ultimately become the deciding force in Israel.

Flapan's personal and professional archives are located at Yad Yaari, Hashomer Hatzair Research and Documentation Center at Givat Haviva.

== Published works ==
- Flapan, Simha (1979). Zionism and the Palestinians (PDF). London: Croom Helm. ISBN 0-85664-499-4.
- Flapan, Simha (1987). The Birth of Israel: Myths and Realities (PDF). New York: Pantheon Books. ISBN 0-394-55888-X.
