= Benny Morris =

Israeli historian (born 1948)

- בני מוריס
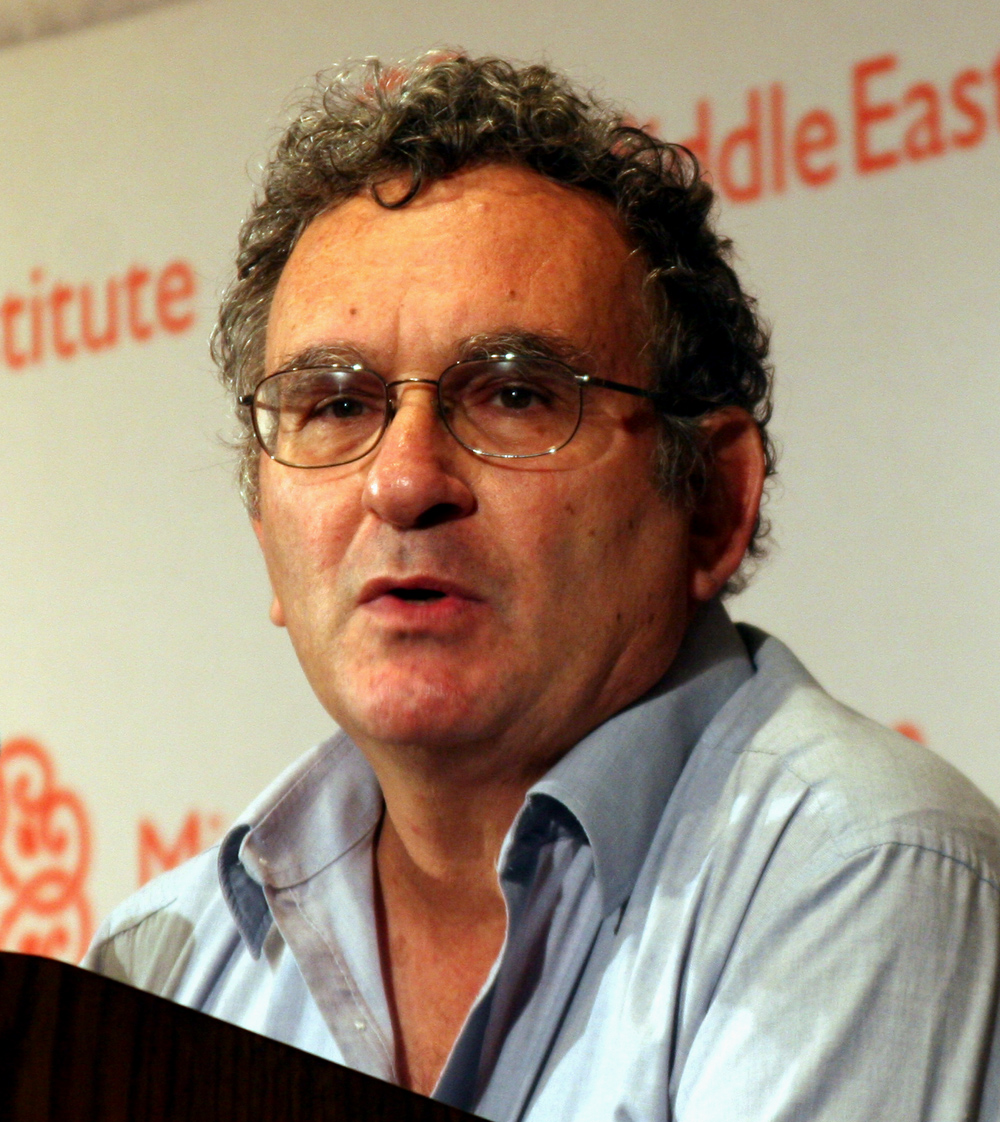
- Morris in 2007
- Born: 8 December 1948 (age 77); Ein HaHoresh, Israel

Academic background
- Education: Hebrew University of Jerusalem (BA); University of Cambridge (PhD)
- Thesis: The British Weekly Press and Nazi Germany During the 1930s (1977)

Academic work
- Discipline: Historian
- School or tradition: New Historians
- Institutions: Ben-Gurion University of the Negev

Benny Morris (Hebrew: בני מוריס; born 8 December 1948) is an Israeli historian. He was a professor of history in the Middle East Studies department of Ben-Gurion University of the Negev in the city of Beersheba, Israel. Morris was initially associated with the group of Israeli historians known as the "New Historians", a term he coined to describe himself and historians Avi Shlaim, Ilan Pappé and Simha Flapan.

Morris's 20th century work on the Arab–Israeli conflict and especially the Israeli–Palestinian conflict has won praise and criticism from both sides of the political divide. Despite regarding himself as a Zionist, he writes, "I embarked upon the research not out of ideological commitment or political interest. I simply wanted to know what happened." One of Morris's major works is the 1989 book The Birth of the Palestinian Refugee Problem, 1947–1948 which, based on then recently declassified Israeli archives, demonstrated that the 1948 exodus of Palestinian refugees was in large part a response to deliberate expulsions and violence by forces loyal to Israel, rather than the result of orders by Arab commanders as had often been historically claimed.

Scholars have perceived an ideological shift in Morris's work starting around 2000, during the Second Intifada. Morris's perspective has been described as having become more conservative and more negative towards Palestinians, viewing the 1948 expulsions as a justified act.

== Biography ==
Morris was born on 8 December 1948 in kibbutz Ein HaHoresh, Israel, the son of Jewish immigrants from the United Kingdom.

His father, Ya'akov Morris, was an Israeli diplomat, historian, and poet, while his mother, Sadie Morris, was a journalist. According to The New Yorker, Benny Morris "grew up in the heart of a left-wing pioneering atmosphere." His family moved to Jerusalem when Morris was one year old. During his youth, he lived for two long periods in New York, where his father was an envoy in Israel's foreign service, and attended the Ramaz School.

Morris served in the Israel Defense Forces as an infantryman, including in the Paratroopers Brigade, from 1967 to 1969. He saw action on the Golan Heights front during the Six-Day War and served on the Suez Canal during the War of Attrition. He was wounded in 1969 by an Egyptian shell in the Suez Canal area and was discharged from active service four months later, but continued to serve in the military reserve until 1990. He completed a B.A. in modern European history from the Hebrew University of Jerusalem and then received a doctorate in modern European history from the University of Cambridge in 1977. His thesis was on Anglo-German relations in the 1930s. Unable to find a job in academia, he took a position as a reporter for The Jerusalem Post. He would work for The Jerusalem Post for 12 years.

Morris served in the 1982 Lebanon War as an army reservist, taking part in the Siege of Beirut in a mortar unit. He also covered the war as a correspondent for The Jerusalem Post. He interviewed the residents of the Rashidieh Palestinian refugee camp near Tyre, which helped pique his interest in the Palestinian refugee issue. In 1986, he did reserve duty in the West Bank. In 1988, when he was called up for reserve duty in Nablus, he refused to serve on ideological grounds, as he viewed Israeli withdrawal from the occupied territories as a necessity and did not want to take part in suppressing the First Intifada, later recalling that "my sympathies were with the rebels. I thought the Arabs really meant what they said and they were out to liberate the West Bank and Gaza from military occupation. I thought that was just. And therefore, I refused to fight them." He was sentenced to three weeks in military prison and was imprisoned for 19 days, with the remaining two deducted for good behavior. He was subsequently discharged from reserve service.

While working at The Jerusalem Post in the 1980s, Morris began reading through the Israel State Archives, at first looking at the history of the Palmach, then turning his attention to the origins of the 1948 Palestinian expulsion and flight. Mainstream Israeli historiography at the time explained the 1948 Palestinian exodus from their towns and villages as having been driven by fear, or by instructions from Arab leaders. Morris found evidence that there had been expulsions in some cases. Another event that Morris revealed for the first time based on his archive study was the contacts between the Israeli officials and the Lebanese Kataeb Party figures, including Elias Rababi, in the period 1948–1951. The related news reports were also published in The Jerusalem Post in 1983.

After publishing The Birth of the Palestinian Refugee Problem in 1988, Morris was widely criticized in Israel. He left The Jerusalem Post in 1991 as part of a mass walkout of journalists due to a perceived right-wing turn in the newspaper and began searching for an academic position, but found that no university would hire him. He continued researching and writing but found it impossible to support his family from his work and had to rely on loans from friends. He considered leaving Israel but was persuaded to stay by Ezer Weizman, then Israel's president, who found him a job at Ben-Gurion University of the Negev in 1997.

From 2015–18, Morris served as the Goldman Visiting Israeli Professor in Georgetown University's Department of Government.

He lives in Srigim (Li On) and is married with three children.

== Political views ==
=== 2004 Haaretz interview ===
In 2004, Haaretz published an interview with Morris conducted by Ari Shavit that has generated significant controversy. Morris told Shavit that his views changed in 2000 after the Palestinian rejection of President Clinton's peace accords and the outbreak of the Second Intifada. He had originally viewed the First Intifada as a legitimate uprising against foreign occupation, and was imprisoned for refusing to serve in the occupied territories as a reservist. In contrast, he has characterized the Second Intifada as a war waged by the Palestinians against Israel with the intention of bringing Israeli society to a state of collapse. According to Morris, "The bombing of the buses and restaurants really shook me. They made me understand the depth of the hatred for us."

Morris said that Israel was justified in uprooting the Palestinian 'fifth column' after the Arabs attacked the infant state, and that proportion should be employed when considering the "small war crimes" committed by Israel. In the interview, Morris stated that:

There is no justification for acts of rape. There is no justification for acts of massacre. Those are war crimes. But in certain conditions, expulsion is not a war crime. I don't think that the expulsions of 1948 were war crimes. [...] There are circumstances in history that justify ethnic cleansing. I know that this term is completely negative in the discourse of the 21st century, but when the choice is between ethnic cleansing and genocide—the annihilation of your people—I prefer ethnic cleansing.

Morris criticised David Ben-Gurion for not fully carrying out such a plan, saying: "In the end, he faltered. ... If Ben-Gurion had carried out a large expulsion and cleansed the whole country [of Mandatory Palestine]... If he had carried out a full expulsion—rather than a partial one—he would have stabilized the State of Israel for generations." Morris also said: "I feel sympathy for the Palestinian people, which truly underwent a hard tragedy. I feel sympathy for the refugees themselves. But if the desire to establish a Jewish state here is legitimate, there was no other choice. It was impossible to leave a large fifth column in the country. From the moment the Yishuv was attacked by the Palestinians and afterward by the Arab states, there was no choice but to expel the Palestinian population. To uproot it in the course of war."

He sees the Jews as the greater victims, as they are "a small minority in a large sea of hostile Arabs who want to eliminate us." According to him, "Arab people gained a large slice of the planet. [...They] have 22 states. The Jewish people did not have even one state. There was no reason in the world why it should not have one state. Therefore, from my point of view, the need to establish this state in this place overcame the injustice that was done to the Palestinians by uprooting them."

Morris told Shavit that he still describes himself as being left-wing because of his support for the two-state solution, but he believes his generation will not see peace in Israel. He has said, "I don't see the suicide bombings as isolated acts. They express the deep will of the Palestinian people. That is what the majority of the Palestinians want." On the subject of "people the Palestinian society sends to carry out the terrorist attacks," he calls them "serial killers" and "barbarians who want to take our lives".

In the same interview, Morris called Israeli Arabs "a time bomb," claiming that "their slide into complete Palestinization has made them an emissary of the enemy that is among us. They are a potential fifth column." On the subject of the potential expulsion of Israeli Arabs, he stated that "in the present circumstances it is neither moral nor realistic. The world would not allow it, the Arab world would not allow it, it would destroy the Jewish society from within. But I am ready to tell you that in other circumstances, apocalyptic ones, which are liable to be realized in five or ten years, I can see expulsions. If we find ourselves with atomic weapons around us, or if there is a general Arab attack on us and a situation of warfare on the front with Arabs in the rear shooting at convoys on their way to the front, acts of expulsion will be entirely reasonable. They may even be essential."

Morris called the Israel–Palestinian conflict a facet of a global clash of civilisations between Islam and the Western World in the Haaretz interview, saying, "There is a deep problem in Islam. It's a world whose values are different. A world in which human life doesn't have the same value as it does in the West, in which freedom, democracy, openness and creativity are alien...Revenge plays a central part in the Arab tribal culture. Therefore, the people we are fighting and the society that sends them have no moral inhibitions."

In response, Ari Shavit commented on Morris's justification for the expulsion of the Arabs in 1948 by contrasting (the more recent) "citizen" Morris with (the earlier) "historian" Morris, and noting that, at times "citizen Morris and historian Morris worked as though there is no connection between them, as though one was trying to save what the other insists on eradicating."

Morris later denied the term "ethnic cleansing" with regard to the actions undertaken by Jewish forces in Israel during the year 1948. He said that possibly, the term might apply in a limited or partial context to Lod and Ramla. He says that according to historical records, approximately 160,000 Arabs remained within the territories of Israel post-1948 and that while many were indeed expelled, a significant number managed to return and retained their status as citizens of the newly established Jewish state.

=== Israeli government ===
In July 2019, Morris has sharply criticized the restrictions under the Netanyahu government of access to historical documents related to the 1948 Palestinian Arab exodus, referring to them as "totalitarian." At the same time, Morris argued that much of the criticism of this policy is hypocritical, because the archives of the Arab states remain entirely closed.

In August 2023, Morris was one of more than 1,500 U.S., Israeli, Jewish and Palestinian academics and public figures who signed an open letter stating that Israel operates "a regime of apartheid" and calling on US Jewish groups to speak out against the occupation in Palestine. In an October 2023 interview, he stated that he does not consider Israel an "apartheid state", but that when signing the letter mentioned above he meant to refer to Israel's occupation of the West Bank as "an apartheid regime based on nationalism".

Morris is critical of the Israeli settlements, calling it "counterproductive" because it will not assure Israel's security. He called some of the settlers "right-wing fanatics", who are violent towards their Palestinian neighbors. According to him, Israel should have withdrawn from the West Bank immediately after the Six-Day War, allowed the Jordanians to reoccupy the territory.

In September 2026, Morris signed a letter, together with over 6,000 others, including academics, historians and legal experts, rejecting the claim that Israel committed genocide in Gaza.

=== Statements on Iran ===
In an op-ed piece in The New York Times in July 2008, Morris wrote: "Iran's leaders would do well to rethink their gamble and suspend their nuclear program. Bar this, the best they could hope for is that Israel's conventional air assault will destroy their nuclear facilities. To be sure, this would mean thousands of Iranian casualties and international humiliation. But the alternative is an Iran turned into a nuclear wasteland." In an interview with the Austrian newspaper Der Standard in May 2008, Morris argued that a pre-emptive nuclear strike on Iran may have to be used as a last resort to stop the Iranian nuclear program. Morris reiterated this view in an op-ed in Haaretz in June 2024, writing, "If Israel proves incapable of destroying the Iranian nuclear project using conventional weaponry, then it may not have any option but to resort to its nonconventional capabilities."

=== Israel's future ===
In a 2019 interview with Haaretz, Morris took a pessimistic view of Israel's future, arguing that the Palestinians would not compromise and that ultimately "a situation in which we rule an occupied people that has no rights cannot persist in the 21st century, in the modern world". He claimed that as soon as the Palestinians did have rights, Israel would no longer be a Jewish state, and that it would descend into intercommunal violence with Jews ultimately becoming a persecuted minority and those who could emigrating. According to Morris, "the Palestinians look at everything from a broad, long-term perspective. They see that at the moment, there are five-six-seven million Jews here, surrounded by hundreds of millions of Arabs. They have no reason to give in, because the Jewish state can't last. They are bound to win. In another 30 to 50 years they will overcome us, come what may."

== Published works ==
=== The Birth of the Palestinian Refugee Problem, 1947–1948 ===
In his 1988 book, Morris retraces the stages of the 1948 Palestinian expulsion and flight. He meticulously examines the fate of each abandoned Palestinian village, the reason for its depopulation, and its subsequent fate. Morris also considers Israel's decision to bar the refugees' return and the international context. This book laid the foundation for Morris's reputation as the preeminent historian of the 1948 War.

=== 1948 and After ===
1948 and After: Israel and the Palestinians (1990) is a collection of essays dedicated to the Palestinian exodus of 1948 and subsequent events. It analyses Mapai and Mapam policy during the exodus, the IDF report of July 1948 on its causes, Yosef Weitz's involvement in the events, and some cases of expulsions that occurred in the fifties.

=== The Birth of the Palestinian Refugee Problem Revisited ===
Published in 2004, the book documents new archival material revealed during 25 years since Morris's earlier work. His work considers what happens in urban communities, such as Jerusalem, Jaffa and Haifa.

=== 1948: A History of the First Arab–Israeli War ===
Morris demolishes misconceptions and provides a detailed account of the war between various factions that year that caused the creation of the modern state of Israel. The book has been described as "the most definitive study of the first Arab–Israeli war."

=== One State, Two States ===
Morris contends that there is no two-state solution to the Middle East crisis, and that the one-state solution is not viable because of Arab unwillingness to accept a Jewish national presence in the Middle East and cultural differences including less Arab respect for human life and rule of law. He suggests the possibility of something like a three-state solution in the form of a Palestinian confederation with Jordan.

=== The Thirty-Year Genocide, Turkey's Destruction of its Christian Minorities, 1894-1924 ===
The book describes the Ottoman/Turkish destruction of the Armenian, Greek and Assyrian communities by the successive Ottoman, Young Turks' and Atatürk regimes, in which some two million Christians were murdered by their Muslim neighbors.

== Reception ==
Morris has won praise and criticism from both sides of the political divide. Some commentators criticised Morris for being reluctant to accept the implications of the evidence he presents in his work.

=== Avi Shlaim ===
Avi Shlaim, retired professor of international relations at the University of Oxford, and himself a New Historian, writes that Morris investigated the 1948 exodus of the Palestinians "as carefully, dispassionately, and objectively as it is ever likely to be", and that The Birth of the Palestinian Refugee Problem is an "outstandingly original, scholarly, and important contribution" to the study of the issue. Shlaim writes that many of Morris's critics cling to the tenets of "Old History", the idea of an Israel born untarnished, a David fighting the Arab Goliath. He argues that these ideas are simply false, created not by historians but by the participants in the 1948 war, who wrote about the events they had taken part in without the benefit of access to Israeli government archives, which were first opened up in the early 1980s.

=== Shlomo Ben-Ami ===
Shlomo Ben-Ami, a historian and former Israeli Minister of Foreign Affairs, praised Morris's book The Birth of the Palestinian Refugee Problem Revisited' (2008). He called it "the single most important work on the thorniest moral and political issue underlying the Israeli–Palestinian conundrum" and suggested it is likely to become "the most definitive study of the first Arab–Israeli war."

However, Ben-Ami criticised Morris's drawing of an "awkward symmetry" between the Palestinian refugee crisis and the "forced emigration" of Jews from the Arab world. Like Yoav Gelber, he was also unconvinced by Morris's characterization of the 1948 conflict as an Islamic Jihad.

In his own book Scars of War, Wounds of Peace, Ben-Ami observed that Morris's "thesis about the birth of the Palestine refugee problem being not by design but by the natural logic and evolution of war is not always sustained by the very evidence he himself provides: 'cultured officers ... had turned into base murderers and this not in the heat of battle ... but out of a system of expulsion and destruction; the less Arabs remained, the better; this principle is the political motor for the expulsions and atrocities' [quoting from Morris's major 2004 work 'The Birth of the Palestinian Refugee Problem Revisited']".

=== Efraim Karsh ===
Efraim Karsh, professor of Mediterranean Studies at King's College London, writes that Morris engages in what Karsh calls "five types of distortion". According to Karsh, Morris "misrepresents documents, resorts to partial quotes, withholds evidence, makes false assertions, and rewrites original documents... [he] tells of statements never made, decisions never taken, events that never happened ... at times [he] does not even take the trouble to provide evidence..... He expects his readers to take on trust his assertions that fundamental contradictions exist between published accounts and the underlying documents.....he systematically falsifies evidence. Indeed, there is scarcely a document that he does not twist. This casts serious doubt on the validity of his entire work." In addition he claimed to expose a serious gap between Morris's text and the original diary of Ben-Gurion, the first prime minister of Israel.

Yezid Sayigh, professor of Middle East Studies in the Department of War Studies at King's College London, writes of Karsh's criticism, "[t]his is not the first time that Efraim Karsh has written a highly self-important rebuttal of revisionist history. He is simply not what he makes himself out to be, a trained historian (nor political/social scientist)." (Karsh responds that he has an undergraduate degree in modern Middle Eastern history, and Arabic language and literature, and a doctorate in political science and international relations.) Sayigh urges academics to compose "robust responses [to Karsh] that make sure that any self-respecting scholar will be too embarrassed to even try to incorporate the Karsh books in his/her teaching or research because they can't pretend they didn't know how flimsy their foundations are".

Morris responds that Karsh's article is a "mélange of distortions, half-truths, and plain lies that vividly demonstrates his profound ignorance of both the source material (his piece contains more than fifty footnotes but is based almost entirely on references to and quotations from secondary works, many of them of dubious value) and the history of the Zionist–Arab conflict. It does not deserve serious attention or reply." Anita Shapira, Dean of Tel Aviv University, argues "thirty of [Karsh's] references actually refer to writings by Shlaim and Morris, and fifteen others cite primary sources, and the rest refer to studies by major historians...."

Morris elsewhere argues that Karsh "belabor[s] minor points while completely ignoring, and hiding from his readers, the main pieces of evidence" and argued, "... Karsh, while claiming to have 'demolished' the whole oeuvre, in fact deal[t] with only four pages of Birth. These pages tried to show that the Zionist leadership during 1937–38 supported a 'transfer solution' to the prospective Jewish state's 'Arab problem.'" Commenting on the Revisited version of Morris'work, Karsh states that in "an implicit acknowledgement of their inaccuracy, Morris has removed some of The Birth's most inaccurate or distorted quotations about transfer."

=== Norman Finkelstein and Nur Masalha ===
Morris has also been criticised by Norman Finkelstein and Nur Masalha. They argue that Morris's conclusions have a pro-Israeli bias, in that he has not fully acknowledged that his work rests largely on selectively released Israeli documentation, while the most sensitive documents remain closed to researchers, and has more broadly treated the evidence in Israeli documents in an uncritical way, and not taking into account that they are, at times, apologetic. In relations to specific work on the 1948 Palestinian expulsion and flight, they assert that Morris minimised the number of expulsions, with Finkelstein writing that many events classified by Morris as "abandonment" or "military assault on settlement" were actually expulsions, and that when the conclusions of Morris's evidence are harsh for the Israelis he has tended to give them a less incriminating spin.

In a reply to Finkelstein and Masalha, Morris answers he "saw enough material, military and civilian, to obtain an accurate picture of what happened", that Finkelstein and Masalha draw their conclusions with a pro-Palestinian bias, and that with regard to the distinction between military assault and expulsion they should accept that he uses a "more narrow and severe" definition of expulsions. Morris holds to his conclusion that there was no transfer policy.

=== Ilan Pappé ===
Benny Morris wrote a review critical of Ilan Pappé's 2004 book A History of Modern Palestine for The New Republic. Morris called Pappé's book "truly appalling". He says it subjugates history to political ideology, and "contains errors of a quantity and a quality that are not found in serious historiography". Replying, Pappé accused Morris of using mainly Israeli sources, and disregarding Arab sources, which – Pappé alleged – Morris "cannot read".

=== Michael Palumbo ===
Michael Palumbo, author of The Palestinian Catastrophe: The 1948 Expulsion of a People from Their Homeland, reviewing the first edition of Morris's book on Palestinian refugees, criticises Morris's decision, which Palumbo thinks characteristic of Israeli revisionist historians generally, to rely mainly on official, "carefully screened" Israeli sources, especially for radio transcripts of Arab broadcasts, while disregarding unofficial Israeli sources such as transcripts from the BBC and CIA, many of which point to a policy of expulsion. He says Morris failed to supplement his work in Israeli archives, many still classified, by U.N., American, and British archival sources that Palumbo considers objective on such issues as IDF atrocities, as well as oral testimonies of Palestinians and Israelis, which can be reliable if their substance can be independently verified. Palumbo commends

Morris' regard for documentation is indeed commendable, were it not for his tendency to choose sources which support his views, while avoiding those document collections which contain information inconsistent with his principal arguments. His decision not to use the testimony of Israeli veterans is unfortunate, since some of them have spoken candidly about Israeli atrocities and expulsion of civilians at Deir Yassin, Lydda–Ramle and Jaffa.

=== Baruch Kimmerling ===
In an article in HNN, Baruch Kimmerling discusses Morris's 2004 Haaretz interview in which Morris states:

if he was already engaged in expulsion, maybe he should have done a complete job. I know that this stuns the Arabs and the liberals and the politically correct types. But my feeling is that this place would be quieter and know less suffering if the matter had been resolved once and for all. If Ben-Gurion had carried out a large expulsion and cleaned the whole country—the whole Land of Israel, as far as the Jordan River. It may yet turn out that this was his fatal mistake. If he had carried out a full expulsion—rather than a partial one—he would have stabilized the State of Israel for generations... Even the great American democracy could not have been created without the annihilation of the Indians. There are cases in which the overall, final good justifies harsh and cruel acts that are committed in the course of history.

Kimmerling describes Morris's views as "shocking" and says that Morris "has abandoned his historian's mantle and donned the armor of a Jewish chauvinist who wants the Land of Israel completely cleansed from Arabs" He criticizes the analysis of Morris as misunderstanding the impact of the refugee problem on the current conflict, and the magnitude of an even larger refugee population.

=== Yoav Gelber ===
Yoav Gelber has praised Morris's 2008 book on the origins of the 1948 Israeli–Arab war, stating that "In general, however, 1948 is a praiseworthy achievement of research and analysis, the work of a historian unwilling to rest on his already considerable laurels." On the other hand, Gelber criticised Morris for granting too much importance to the militant Islamic rhetoric of the period.

== Awards and recognition ==
- 2008: National Jewish Book Award in the History category for 1948: A History of the First Arab–Israeli War

== List of publications ==
- The Birth of the Palestinian Refugee Problem, 1947–1949, Cambridge University Press, 1988. ISBN 978-0-521-33028-2
- Israel's Secret Wars: A History of Israel's Intelligence Services, with Ian Black, New York, Grove Weidenfeld, 1991. ISBN 978-0-8021-1159-3
- Israel's Border Wars 1949–1956: Arab Infiltration, Israeli Retaliation, and the Countdown to the Suez War, Oxford, Clarendon Press, 1993. ISBN 978-0-19-829262-3
- 1948 and after; Israel and the Palestinians, Clarendon Press, Oxford, 1994. ISBN 0-19-827929-9
- Righteous Victims: A History of the Zionist–Arab Conflict, 1881–1999. New York: Alfred A. Knopf. 2001 [Original in 1999] ISBN 978-0-679-74475-7
- Correcting a Mistake: Jews and Arabs in Palestine/Israel, 1936-1956, Am Oved Publishers, 2000.
- The Road to Jerusalem: Glubb Pasha, Palestine and the Jews. New York: I.B. Tauris, 2003. ISBN 978-1-86064-812-0
- The Birth of the Palestinian Refugee Problem Revisited, Cambridge University Press, 2004. ISBN 978-0-521-00967-6
- Making Israel (ed), University of Michigan Press, 2008. ISBN 978-0-472-11541-9
- 1948: A History of the First Arab–Israeli War, Yale University Press, 2008. ISBN 978-0-300-12696-9
- One State, Two States: Resolving the Israel/Palestine Conflict, Yale University Press, 2009. ISBN 978-0-300-12281-7
- The Thirty-Year Genocide: Turkey's Destruction of Its Christian Minorities, 1894-1924 (co-authored with Dror Ze'evi), Harvard University Press, 2019. ISBN 978-0674916456
- Sidney Reilly: Master Spy, Yale University Press, 2022. ISBN 978-0-300-24826-5

== See also ==
- Exodus of Palestinians in 1948
  - 1948 Palestinian exodus from Lydda and Ramle
  - Causes of the 1948 Palestinian exodus
- History of Israel
- Palestinian refugee
- 1948: A History of the First Arab–Israeli War, Morris's 2008 book
