= New Historians =

Israeli historians who have challenged traditional versions of Israeli history

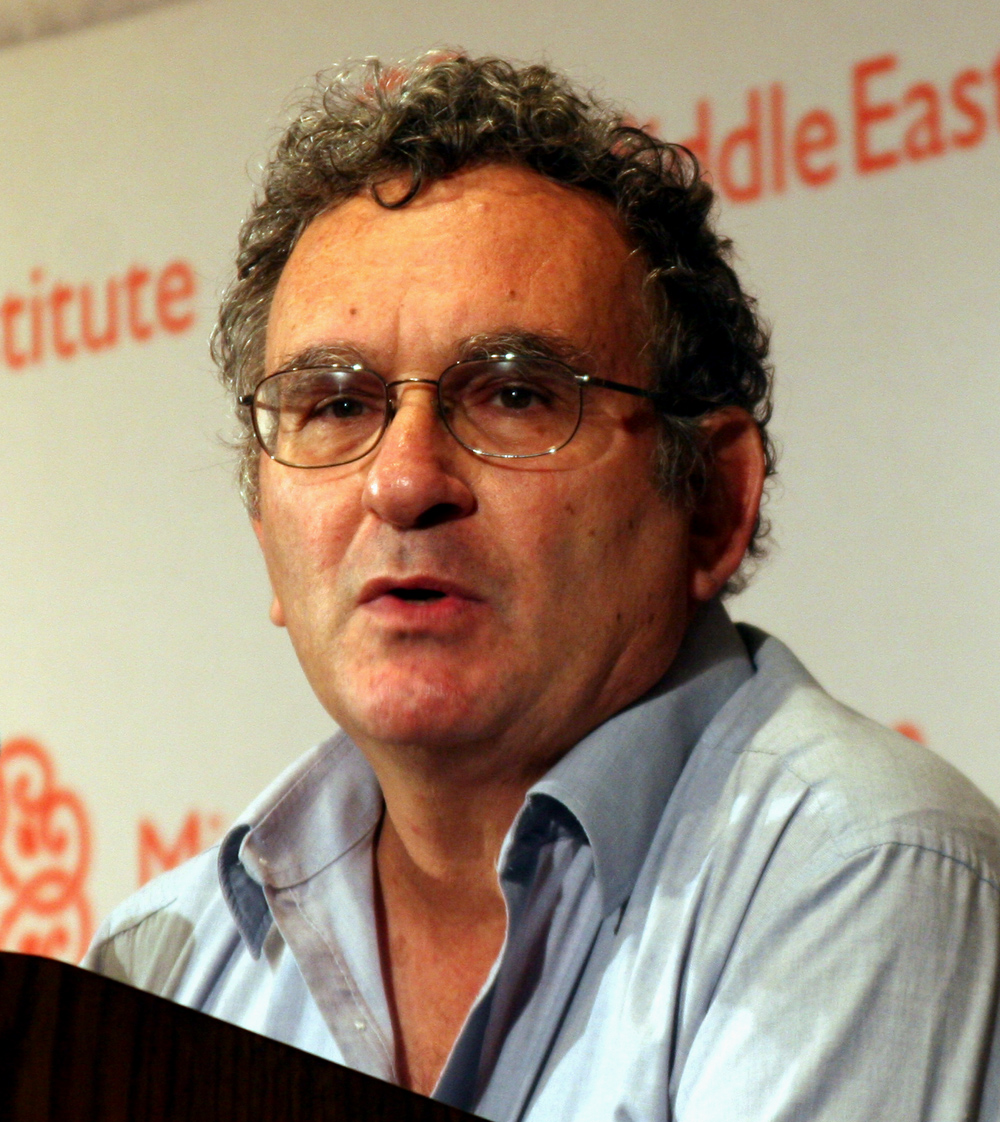
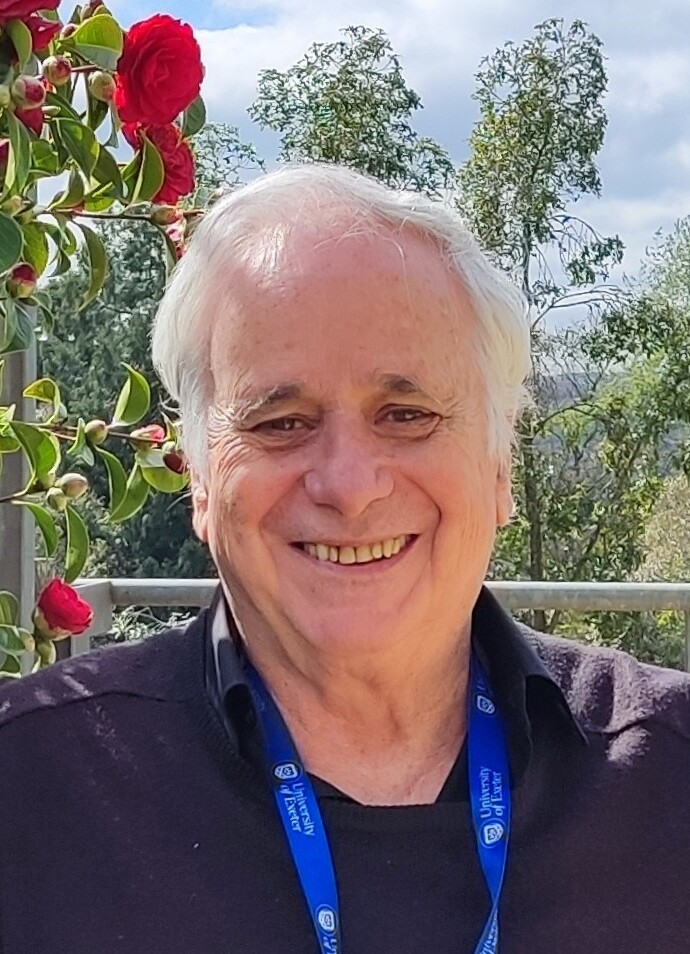
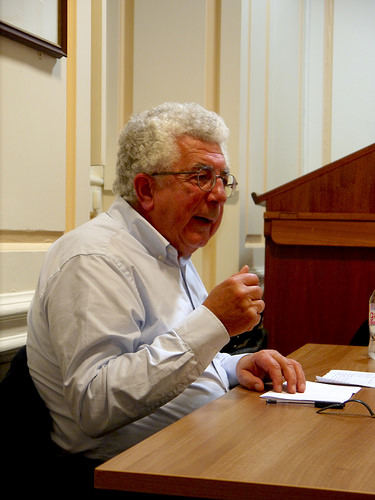
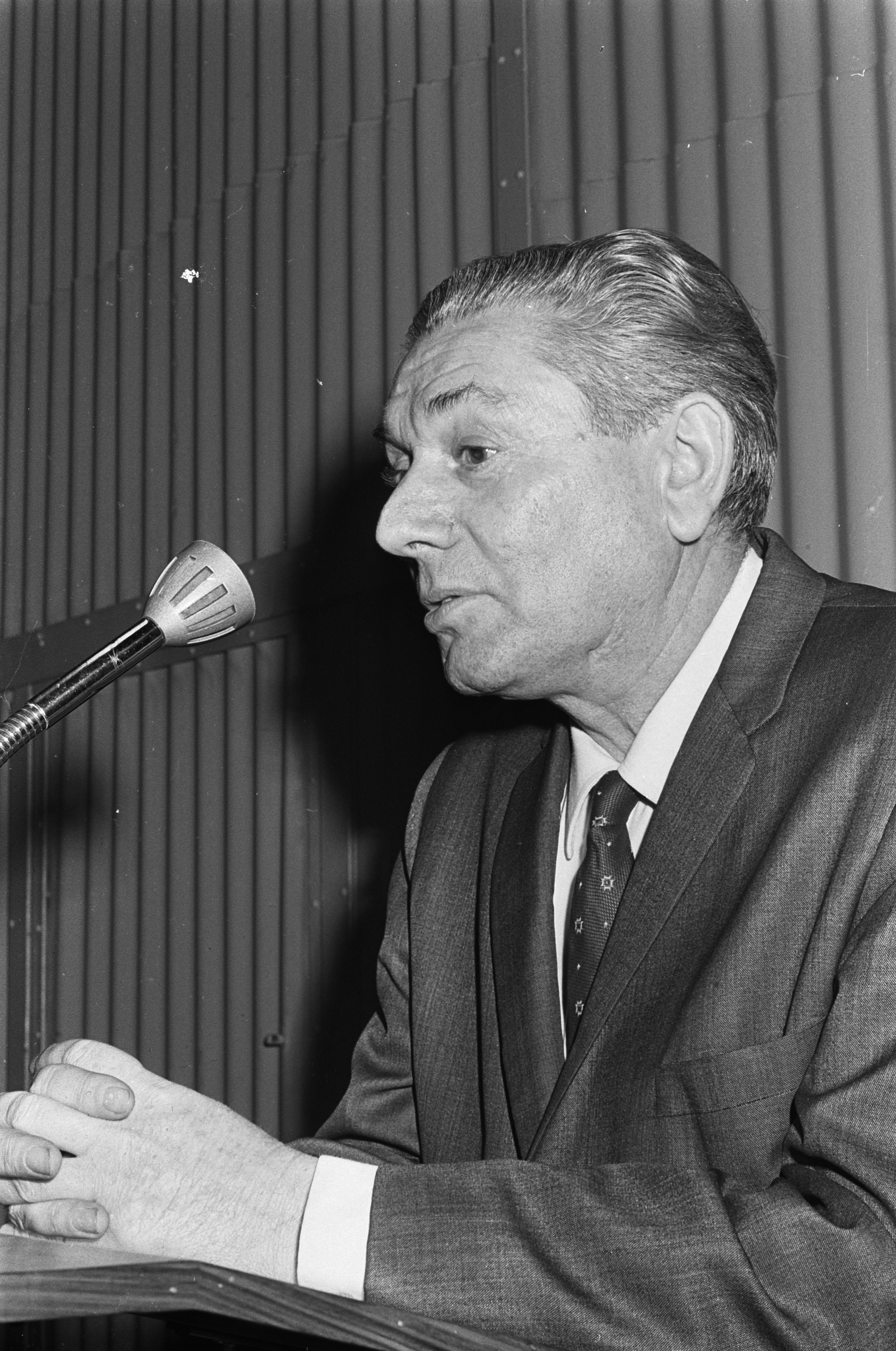
The four original New Historians, Benny Morris (top left), Ilan Pappé (top right), Avi Shlaim (bottom left), and Simha Flapan (bottom right)

The New Historians (Note: Hebrew: ההיסטוריונים החדשים, romanized: HaHistoryonim HaChadashim) are a loosely defined group of Israeli historians who have challenged traditional versions of Israeli history and played a critical role in refuting some of what critics of Israel consider Israel's foundational myths, including Israel's role in the 1948 Palestinian expulsion and flight and Arab willingness to discuss peace. The term was coined in 1988 by Benny Morris, one of the leading New Historians. According to Ethan Bronner of The New York Times, the New Historians have sought to advance the peace process in the region.

Much of the primary source material used by the group comes from Israeli government papers that were newly available as a result of being declassified thirty years after the founding of Israel. The perception of a new historiographical current emerged with the publications of four scholars in the 1980s: Benny Morris, Ilan Pappé, Avi Shlaim, and Simha Flapan. Subsequently, many other historians and historical sociologists—including Tom Segev, Hillel Cohen, Baruch Kimmerling, Joel Migdal, Idith Zertal, and Shlomo Sand—have been identified with the movement.

Initially dismissed by the public, the New Historians gained legitimacy in Israel in the 1990s. Some of their conclusions have been incorporated into the political ideology of post-Zionists. Although influential in Western academia, the 'new history' narrative and post-Zionism have remained marginalized in Israel.

== Background ==
Benny Morris coined the phrase "new historians" in a 1988 paper to describe Ilan Pappé, Avi Shlaim, Simha Flapan, and himself. According to Pappé, "new historians" refers to "a group of professional Israeli historians who worked on the Nakba." Morris states the primary reason for their emergence was the opening of classified Israeli state documents in the late 1970s and 1980s under Israel's thirty-year archival rule. Shlaim and Pappé additionally cite the shift in the political climate of Israel after the 1982 Lebanon War as a second factor for their emergence. Pappé cites Israel's unsuccessful 1982 assault on Lebanon, Israel's "brutal" response to the First Intifada, and the start of negotiations with the PLO as factors that challenged the assurance of some in the state's official version.

Adam Comon writes that there were other influences for the emergence. He cites sociologists such as Baruch Kimmerling, Uri Ram, and Gershon Shafir as being "heavily influenced" by the 1970s–80s international academic climate, which was a "high tide of postmodern theories and multi-narrative histories" that introduced new concepts into the discourse surrounding Israeli history, including Zionism as colonialism.

== Main arguments ==
Avi Shlaim described the New Historians' differences from what he termed the "official history" in the following terms:

- The official version said that Britain tried to prevent the establishment of a Jewish state; the New Historians said that it tried to prevent the establishment of a Palestinian state.
- The official version said that the Palestinians fled their homes of their own free will; the New Historians said that the refugees were expelled or fled.
- The official version said that the balance of power was in favour of the Arabs; the New Historians said that Israel had the advantage both in manpower and in arms.
- The official version said that the Arabs had a coordinated plan to destroy Israel; the New Historians said that the Arabs were divided.
- The official version said that Arab intransigence prevented peace; the New Historians said that Israel is primarily to blame for the "dead end".

Pappé suggests Zionist leaders intended to displace most Palestinian Arabs; Morris believes the displacement happened in the heat of war. According to the New Historians, Israel and Arab countries each have their share of responsibility for the Arab–Israeli conflict and Palestinian plight.

== Reception ==
The writings of the New Historians have come under repeated criticism, both from traditional Israeli historians who accuse them of fabricating Zionist misdeeds, and from Arab or pro-Arab writers who accuse them of whitewashing the truth about Zionist misbehaviour. Efraim Karsh has accused them of ignoring questions that he says are critical: namely, who started the war, what their intentions were, who was forced to mount a defence, and what Israel's casualties were.

Early in 2002, the most famous of the new historians, Benny Morris, publicly reversed some of his personal political positions, though he did not withdraw any of his historical writings. Morris says he did not use much of the newly available archival material when he wrote his book: "When writing The Birth of the Palestinian Refugee Problem 1947–1949 in the mid-1980s, I had no access to the materials in the IDFA [IDF Archive] or the Haganah Archive and precious little to first-hand military materials deposited elsewhere."

Anita Shapira stated that both Avi Shlaim and Morris "make only meager use of original Arab sources" with most such references being in "English translation", and that Shlaim's claim that he "has no need of Arab documents", and Morris' claim that "he is able to extrapolate the Arab positions from the Israeli documentation" results in "obvious distortions".

Israeli historian Yoav Gelber criticized New Historians in an interview, saying that aside from Morris, they did not contribute to the research of the 1948 Arab–Israeli War in any way. He did however note that they contributed to the public discourse about the war.

Historian Raphael Israeli criticized the New Historians for what he described as an insufficient consideration of anti-Israeli and antisemitic currents within parts of the Arab and Muslim world. He argued that some New Historians approached Israeli history with a sense of moral culpability that, in his view, contributed to narratives used in international campaigns seeking to delegitimize Israel, including boycott initiatives and legal activism directed against the state. Israeli distinguished Benny Morris from other New Historians, describing Morris as more attentive to the broader regional context. He also argued that historians in many Arab countries faced political and social constraints that limited open challenges to dominant national narratives regarding the Arab–Israeli conflict.

=== 1990s: Influence on traditional Israeli historical narrative and Western academia ===
Michal Ben-Josef Hirsch argues that, prior to the advent of the New Historians, "Israelis held to a one-sided historical narrative of the circumstances leading to the creation of the Palestinian refugee problem, and that any other counter-narratives were taboo." According to Ben-Josef Hirsch, the conclusions of the New Historians, and the wide-ranging debate that they provoked, ended that taboo and changed the way in which the Palestinian refugee problem and its causes were viewed in Israel. Ben-Josef Hirsch says that the traditional Israeli narrative, that Arabs were responsible for the exodus of the Palestinians, held from 1948 to the late 1990s. She says that the arguments of the New Historians significantly challenged that narrative, leading to a broad debate both in academia and in the wider public discourse, including journalists and columnists, politicians, public figures, and the general public.

The New Historians gained respect and sparked debate in the 1990s. A 1998 series on state television marking Israel's 50th anniversary drew much from their work, as did textbooks introduced to ninth graders in 1999. However, this influence was limited to the late 1980s and early 1990s. Although still influential in Western academia, the 'new history' narrative and post-Zionism have remained marginalized in Israel.

Critics of the New Historians have acknowledged the shift in academia. Avi Beker, writing in the Jerusalem Post, states that the effect of the New Historians' work on the history of the Arab–Israeli conflict "cannot be exaggerated". He says the work of the New Historians is now the mainstream in academia, and that their influence was not confined to intellectual circles. To illustrate his point that New Historians were given legitimacy, he cites examples from changes to Israeli school text books to the actions of Israeli political leaders and developments in the Israeli–Palestinian peace process.

=== Post-Zionism ===
Some commentators have argued that the historiography of the New Historians has both drawn inspiration from, and lent impetus to, a movement known as post-Zionism. Generally the term "post-Zionist" is self-identified by Jewish Israelis who are critical of the Zionist enterprise and are seen by Zionists as undermining the Israeli national ethos. Post-Zionists differ from Zionists on many important details, such as the status of the law of return and other sensitive issues. Post-Zionists view the Palestinian dispossession as central to the creation of the state of Israel.

Baruch Kimmerling criticised the focus on "post-Zionism", arguing that debates around the term were "nonsense and semi-professional and mainly political". According to Kimmerling the term has been arbitrarily applied to any research on Israeli history, society or politics that was critical or perceived to be critical. Kimmerling saw this discussion as damaging to research in these areas because it took the focus away from the quality and merit of scholarship and onto whether the work should be characterized as Zionist or post-Zionist. Further, Kimmerling asserted that academics were diverted away from serious research onto polemical issues and that the environment this fostered inhibited the research of younger academics who were fearful of being labeled as belonging to one of the two camps.

== Major debates ==
On a few occasions there have been heated public debates between the New Historians and their detractors. The most notable:

- Benny Morris and Avi Shlaim versus Shabtai Teveth
  Teveth is best known as a biographer of David Ben-Gurion. Teveth: Middle Eastern Studies, Vol. 26 (1990) 214–249; Morris: 1948 and After; Teveth: Commentary; Morris and Shlaim: Tikkun.
- Benny Morris versus Norman Finkelstein and Nur Masalha
  This took place in three articles in the Journal of Palestine Studies Vol. 21, No. 1, Autumn, 1991. While acknowledging that Morris had brought to light a vast quantity of previously unknown archival material, Finkelstein and Masalha accused Morris of presenting the evidence with a pro-Zionist spin. Finkelstein wrote that "Morris has substituted a new myth, one of the "happy median" for the old", that "the evidence that Morris adduces does not support his temperate conclusions" and that "Morris's central thesis that the Arab refugee problem was "born of war, not by design" is belied by his own evidence which shows that Palestine's Arabs were expelled systematically and with premeditation." (Note: Myths, Old and New, Norman Finkelstein, Journal of Palestine Studies, Vol. 21, No. 1 (Autumn, 1991), pp. 66-89 — "In this essay I will argue that Morris has substituted a new myth, one of the "happy median," for the old. My contention will be that the evidence Morris adduces does not support his temperate conclusions and that the truth lies very much closer to the Arab extreme. Specifically, I will argue that Morris's central thesis that the Arab refugee problem was "born of war, not by design" is belied by his own evidence which shows that Palestine's Arabs were expelled systematically and with premeditation.") Masalha accused Morris of treating the issue as "a debate amongst Zionists which has little to do with the Palestinians themselves", and of ignoring the long history that the idea of "transfer" (removal of the Palestinians) had among Zionist leaders. In his response, Morris accused Finkelstein and Masalha of "outworn preconceptions and prejudices" and reiterated his support for a multifaceted explanation for the Arab flight.
- Benny Morris, Avi Shlaim, and Ilan Pappé versus Efraim Karsh
  Efraim Karsh of King's College, London, is a founding editor of Israel Affairs. Starting with an article in the magazine Middle East Quarterly, Karsh alleged that the New Historians "systematically distort the archival evidence to invent an Israeli history in an image of their own making". Karsh also provides a list of examples where, he claims, the new historians "truncated, twisted, and distorted" primary documents. Shlaim's reply defended his analysis of the Zionist-Hashemite negotiations prior to 1948. Morris declined immediate reply, accusing Karsh of a "mélange of distortions, half-truths, and plain lies", but published a lengthy rebuttal in the Winter 1998 issue of the Journal of Palestine Studies. Morris replied to many of Karsh's detailed accusations, but also returned Karsh's personal invective, going so far as to compare Karsh's work to that of Holocaust deniers. (Note: Morris Refabricating 1948, "Karsh resembles nothing so much as those Holocaust-denying historians who ignore all evidence and common sense in order to press an ideological point.") Karsh also published a review on an article of Morris, charging him with "deep-rooted and pervasive distortions". Karsh systematically rejects the methodology of new historians such as Morris in his book Fabricating Israeli History: The 'New Historians' (Israeli History, Politics and Society) (2000).
- Teddy Katz versus Alexandroni Brigade
  In 1998, Teddy Katz interviewed and taped Israeli and Palestinian witnesses to events at Tantura in 1948 and wrote a master's thesis at Haifa University claiming that the Alexandroni Brigade committed a massacre in the Arab village of Tantura during the 1948 Arab–Israeli war. The veterans of the brigade sued Katz for libel. During the court hearing Katz conceded by issuing a statement retracting his own work. He then tried to retract his retraction, but the court disallowed it and ruled against him. He appealed to the Supreme Court but it declined to intervene. Meanwhile, a committee at Haifa University claimed to have found serious problems with the thesis, including "quotations" that were contradicted by Katz's taped records of interview. The university suspended his degree and asked him to resubmit his thesis. The new thesis was given a "second-class" pass. The Tantura debate remains heated, with Ilan Pappé continuing to support allegations of a massacre.

== See also ==
- Historiography
- Historical revisionism
- History wars (comparable Australian phenomenon)

== Bibliography ==
- Efraim Karsh, Rewriting Israel's History, Middle East Quarterly, June 1996, Volume 3, Number 2.
- Efraim Karsh, Benny Morris and the Reign of Error, Middle East Quarterly, March 1999, Volume 6, Number 1.
- Efraim Karsh, "Resurrecting the Myth: Benny Morris, the Zionist Movement, and the 'Transfer' Idea", Israel Affairs, Vol. 11, No. 3 (July 2005), pp. 469–490.
- Benny Morris, Peace? No chance, The Guardian, 21 February 2002.
- Benny Morris, Undeserving of a Reply Middle East Quarterly, September 1996, Volume 3, Number 3.
- David Ratner, PA paid legal defense fees of 1948 Tantura affair historian, Haaretz online, article undated, retrieved 25 February 2005.
- Anita Shapira, The Past is not a Foreign Country, The New Republic, 29 November 1999.
- Avi Shlaim, A Totalitarian Concept of History, Middle East Quarterly, September 1996, Volume 3, Number 3.
