= Bibliography of the Arab–Israeli conflict =

This is an incomplete bibliography of the Arab–Israeli conflict.

== Arab–Israeli conflict ==
=== Arab–Israeli conflict (2020s) ===
- Anziska, Seth (2020). Preventing Palestine: A Political History from Camp David to Oslo. Princeton University Press. ISBN 978-0-691-20245-7.
- Berriault, Jack (2020). Israel and Palestine - A Common Historical Narrative (in English, Hebrew, and Arabic) (Multilingual ed.). Mamaroneck, New York: Israel Academic Press. ISBN 978-1-885881-61-8.
- Bickerton, Ian J.; Klausner, Carla L. (2023) [1986]. A History of the Arab–Israeli Conflict (9th ed.). Taylor & Francis. ISBN 978-1-000-60028-5. OCLC 1328028538.
- Kumaraswamy, P. R. (2023). The Arab-Israeli Conflict: A Ringside View. Taylor & Francis. ISBN 978-1-000-87184-5. OCLC 1350914792.
- Mahler, Gregory S. (2023) [2009]. The Arab-Israeli Conflict: An Introduction and Documentary Reader (3rd ed.). Taylor & Francis. ISBN 978-1-000-91131-2. OCLC 1389552804.
- Romirowsky, Asaf (2021-07-05). Hijacking the Arab-Israeli Conflict. Routledge. ISBN 978-1-000-40436-4.
- Sabel, Robbie (2022-04-28). International Law and the Arab-Israeli Conflict. Cambridge University Press. ISBN 978-1-108-48684-2.
- Said Aly, Abdel Monem; Feldman, Shai; Shikaki, Khalil (2022) [2013]. Arabs and Israelis: Conflict and Peacemaking in the Middle East (2nd ed.). Bloomsbury Publishing. ISBN 978-1-350-32140-3. OCLC 1332951367.
- Slater, Jerome (2020). Mythologies Without End: The US, Israel, and the Arab-Israeli Conflict, 1917-2020. Oxford University Press. ISBN 978-0-19-045908-6.
- Smith, Charles D. (2020) [1988]. Palestine and the Arab-Israeli Conflict: A History with Documents (10th ed.). Bedford/St. Martin's. ISBN 978-1-319-23973-2.

=== Arab–Israeli conflict (2010s) ===
- Bickerton, Ian (2012-02-02). The Arab-Israeli Conflict: A Guide for the Perplexed. A&C Black. ISBN 978-1-4411-2872-0.
- Black, Ian (2017-11-07). Enemies and Neighbors: Arabs and Jews in Palestine and Israel, 1917-2017. Atlantic Monthly Press. ISBN 978-0-8021-8879-3.
- Cohen, Hillel (2015-10-22). Year Zero of the Arab-Israeli Conflict 1929. Brandeis University Press. ISBN 978-1-61168-812-2.
- Eisenberg, Laura Zittrain; Caplan, Neil (2010-07-14). Negotiating Arab-Israeli Peace, Second Edition: Patterns, Problems, Possibilities. Indiana University Press. ISBN 978-0-253-00457-4.
- Gopin, Marc (2012-11-01). Bridges across an Impossible Divide. Oxford University Press. doi:10.1093/acprof:oso/9780199916986.001.0001. ISBN 978-0-19-991698-6.
- Jamal, Amal (2011). Arab Minority Nationalism in Israel: The Politics of Indigeneity. Routledge. ISBN 978-1-136-82412-8.
- Karsh, Efraim (2014-06-06). The Arab-Israeli Conflict: The Palestine War 1948. Bloomsbury Publishing. ISBN 978-1-4728-1001-4.
- Klein, Menachem (2014). Lives in Common: Arabs and Jews in Jerusalem, Jaffa and Hebron. Oxford University Press. ISBN 978-0-19-939626-9.
- Rynhold, Jonathan (2015-02-23). The Arab-Israeli Conflict in American Political Culture. Cambridge University Press. ISBN 978-1-107-09442-0.
- Ross, Dennis (2015-10-13). Doomed to Succeed: The U.S.–Israel Relationship from Truman to Obama. New York: Macmillan. ISBN 978-0-374-14146-2.
- Thrall, Nathan (2017). The only language they understand: forcing compromise in Israel and Palestine. New York: Metropolitan Books, Henry Holt and Company. ISBN 978-1-62779-709-2.

=== Arab–Israeli conflict (2000s) ===
- Ben-Ami, Shlomo (2006-02-06). Scars of War, Wounds of Peace: The Israeli-Arab Tragedy. Oxford University Press. ISBN 978-0-19-531347-5. OCLC 61463610.
- Bickerton, Ian J.; Klausner, Carla L. (2005) [1991]. A Concise History of the Arab-Israeli Conflict (4th. updated ed.). Prentice Hall. ISBN 978-0-13-190004-2. OCLC 54479246.
- Bregman, Ahron (2002). Israel's Wars: A History Since 1947 (2nd ed.). London; New York: Routledge. ISBN 978-0-415-28715-9.
- Fraser, Thomas (2015-08-28). The Arab-Israeli Conflict. Macmillan Education UK. ISBN 978-1-137-38743-1.
- Laqueur, Walter; Rubin, Barry (2008-04-29). The Israel-Arab Reader: A Documentary History of the Middle East Conflict: Seventh Revised and Updated Edition (7th ed.). Penguin. ISBN 978-1-4406-3733-9.
- Morris, Benny (2008). 1948: A History of the First Arab-Israeli War. Yale University Press. ISBN 978-0-300-14524-3.
- Morris, Benny (2001-08-28). Righteous Victims: A History of the Zionist-Arab Conflict, 1881-2001. Knopf Doubleday Publishing Group. ISBN 978-0-679-74475-7.
- Ross, Dennis (June 2005). The Missing Peace: The Inside Story of the Fight for Middle East Peace. Macmillan. ISBN 978-0-374-52980-2.
- Sela, Avraham (2002-09-05). "The Arab-Israeli-Conflict," in Continuum Political Encyclopedia of the Middle East: Revised and Updated Edition. Bloomsbury Academic. pp. 58–121. ISBN 978-0-8264-1413-7.
- Shipler, David K. (2002). Arab and Jew: Wounded Spirits in a Promised Land. Penguin Books. ISBN 978-0-14-200229-2.
- Shlaim, Avi (2001). The Iron Wall: Israel and the Arab World. Penguin. ISBN 978-0-14-028870-4.
- Smith, Charles D. (2004). Palestine and the Arab-Israeli Conflict. Bedford/St. Martin's. ISBN 978-0-312-40408-6.
- Swisher, Clayton (2004-09-21). The Truth About Camp David: The Untold Story About the Collapse of the Middle East Peace Process. PublicAffairs. ISBN 978-1-56025-623-6.
- Quandt, William B. (2005). The Peace Process: From Breakthrough to Breakdown. Washington, DC: Univ of California Press. ISBN 978-0-520-24631-7.

=== Arab–Israeli conflict (20th century) ===
- Abu-Lughod, Ibrahim A., ed. (1971). The Transformation of Palestine: essays on the origin and development of the Arab-Israeli conflict. Evanston [Ill.]: Northwestern University Press. ISBN 978-0-8101-0345-0.
- Antonius, George (2015-03-16). The Arab Awakening: The Story of the Arab National Movement. Echo Point Books and Media. ISBN 978-1-62654-086-6.
- Ovendale, Ritchie (2015) [1984]. The Origins of the Arab Israeli Wars. Origins Of Modern Wars (4th ed.). s.l: Taylor and Francis. ISBN 978-0-582-82320-4.
- Barzilai, Gad (1996-01-01). Wars, Internal Conflicts, and Political Order: A Jewish Democracy in the Middle East. SUNY Press. ISBN 978-0-7914-2943-3.
- Benvenisti, Meron (1995). Intimate enemies: Jews and Arabs in a shared land. Berkeley (Calif.): University of California Press. ISBN 978-0-520-08567-1.
- Brown, Nathan J. (1997). The Rule of Law in the Arab World: Courts in Egypt and the Gulf. Cambridge University Press. ISBN 978-0-521-03068-7.
- Rubinstein, Alvin Z.; Dowty, Alan, eds. (1991). The Arab-Israeli conflict: perspectives (2nd ed.). New York, NY: HarperCollins. ISBN 978-0-673-46405-7.
- ESCO Foundation (1947). Palestine – A Study Of Jewish Arab And British Policies. Vol. I. Yale University Press. OCLC 459549878.
- Hurewitz, J. C. (2022-07-21) [1976]. The Struggle for Palestine. Plunkett Lake Press. ISBN 978-0-8052-0524-4.
- Khouri, Fred J. (1985-09-01). The Arab Israeli Dilemma: Third Edition. Syracuse University Press. ISBN 978-0-8156-2340-3.
- Pappé, Ilan (2006). The making of the Arab-Israeli conflict 1947 - 1951 (Reprinted ed.). London: Tauris. ISBN 978-1-85043-819-9.
- Sela, Avraham (2012-02-01). The Decline of the Arab-Israeli Conflict: Middle East Politics and the Quest for Regional Order. State University of New York Press. ISBN 978-1-4384-1939-8.

== Israeli–Palestinian conflict ==
=== Israeli–Palestinian conflict (2020s) ===
- Barnett, Michael; Brown, Nathan J.; Lynch, Marc; Telhami, Shibley, eds. (2023). The One State Reality: What Is Israel/Palestine?. Cornell University Press. ISBN 978-1-5017-6842-2.
- Bartov, Omer (2021). Israel-Palestine: Lands and Peoples. Berghahn Books. ISBN 978-1-80073-130-1.
- Bartov, Omer (2023). Genocide, the Holocaust and Israel-Palestine: First-Person History in Times of Crisis. Bloomsbury Publishing. ISBN 978-1-350-33234-8.
- Biggs, Victoria (2020). Youth and Conflict in Israel-Palestine: Storytelling, Contested Space and the Politics of Memory. Bloomsbury Publishing. ISBN 978-1-83860-492-9.
- Bracka, Jeremie (2022). Transitional Justice for Israel/Palestine: Truth-Telling and Empathy in Ongoing Conflict. Springer. ISBN 978-3-030-89435-1.
- Cohn-Sherbok, Dan; El Alami, Dawoud Sudqi (2022) [2001]. The Palestine-Israeli Conflict: A Beginner's Guide (5th ed.). Oneworld Publications. ISBN 978-0-86154-370-0. OCLC 1332952719.
- Dowty, Alan (2023) [2005]. Israel / Palestine (5th ed.). Polity Press. ISBN 978-1-78960-408-5. OCLC 1159827251.
- Feldman, Rachel Z.; McGonigle, Ian (2023-10-15). Settler-Indigeneity in the West Bank. McGill-Queen's Press - MQUP. ISBN 978-0-2280-1954-1.
- Gelvin, James L. (2021) [2006]. The Israel-Palestine Conflict: A History (4th ed.). Cambridge University Press. ISBN 978-1-108-48868-6. OCLC 1200831609.
- Kotef, Hagar (2020). The Colonizing Self: Or, Home and Homelessness in Israel/Palestine. Duke University Press. ISBN 978-1-4780-1286-3.
- Mor, Liron (2024). Conflicts: The Poetics and Politics of Palestine-Israel. Fordham University Press. ISBN 978-1-5315-0545-5.
- Naser-Najjab, Nadia (2020). Dialogue in Palestine: The People-to-People Diplomacy Programme and the Israeli-Palestinian Conflict. Bloomsbury Publishing. ISBN 978-1-83860-385-4.
- Ricarte, Joana (2022). The Impact of Protracted Peace Processes on Identities in Conflict: The Case of Israel and Palestine. Rethinking Peace and Conflict Studies. Springer Nature. doi:10.1007/978-3-031-16567-2. ISBN 978-3-031-16567-2.
- Siniver, Asaf, ed. (2022). Routledge Companion to the Israeli-Palestinian Conflict. Routledge. ISBN 978-0-429-64861-8. OCLC 1288424737.
- Todorova, Teodora (2021). Decolonial Solidarity in Palestine-Israel: Settler Colonialism and Resistance from Within. Bloomsbury Publishing. ISBN 978-1-78699-642-8.
- Torczyner, Jim (2020). Rights-Based Community Practice and Academic Activism in a Turbulent World: Putting Theory into Practice in Israel, Palestine and Jordan. Routledge. ISBN 978-1-000-31852-4.
- Zureik, Elia T. (2023). The Palestinians in Israel: A Study in Internal Colonialism. Taylor & Francis. ISBN 978-1-000-85711-5.

=== Israeli–Palestinian conflict (2010s) ===
- Caplan, Neil (2010). The Israel-Palestine conflict: contested histories. Contesting the past. Chichester, U.K. Malden, MA: Wiley-Blackwell. ISBN 978-1-4051-7539-5.
- Dan Bar-On; Eyal J. Naveh, eds. (2012). Side by Side: Parallel Histories of Israel–Palestine. New Press. ISBN 978-1-59558-683-4.
- Gabbay, Shaul M.; Kazak, Amin (2012). One Land: Two Stories. Livingston Publishing House. p. 554. ISBN 978-0-9851961-0-3.
- Gelvin, James L. (2014) [2005]. The Israel-Palestine Conflict: One Hundred Years of War (3rd ed.). Cambridge University Press. ISBN 978-1-107-03718-2.
- Gerner, Deborah J. (2018-05-04). One Land, Two Peoples. Routledge. doi:10.4324/9780429494918. ISBN 978-0-429-49491-8.
- Golani, Moṭi; Mannāʿ, ʿĀdil (2011). Two Sides of the Coin: Independence and Nakba, 1948: Two Narratives of the 1948 War and Its Outcome. Institute for Historical Justice and Reconciliation series. Translated by Forman, Geremy. Dordrecht: Republik of Letters Publishing. ISBN 978-90-8979-080-4.
- Gutman, Yifat (2017). Memory Activism: Reimagining the Past for the Future in Israel-Palestine. Vanderbilt University Press. ISBN 978-0-8265-2135-4.
- Ilan Pappé; Jamil Hilal, eds. (2010). Across the Wall: Narratives of Israeli–Palestinian History. I.B. Tauris. pp. 462 pages. ISBN 978-1-84885-345-4.
- Matthews, Elizabeth (2011-03-21). The Israel-Palestine Conflict: Parallel Discourses. Taylor & Francis. ISBN 978-1-136-88432-0.
- Shihade, Magid (2011). Not Just a Soccer Game: Colonialism and Conflict among Palestinians in Israel. Syracuse University Press. ISBN 978-0-8156-5111-6.
- Waxman, Dov (2019-04-01). The Israeli-Palestinian Conflict: What Everyone Needs to Know®. Oxford University Press. ISBN 978-0-19-062534-4.

=== Israeli–Palestinian conflict (2000s) ===
- Bard, Mitchell Geoffrey (2007). Will Israel survive?. New York: Palgrave Macmillan. ISBN 978-1-4039-8198-1.
- Catignani, Sergio (2008). Israeli counter-insurgency and the Intifadas: dilemmas of a conventional army. Middle Eastern military studies. London New York: Routledge. ISBN 978-0-415-43388-4.
- Enderlin, Charles (2003). Shattered dreams: the failure of the peace process in the Middle East, 1995-2002. New York: Other Press. ISBN 978-1-59051-060-5.
- Guyatt, Nicholas (1998). The absence of peace: understanding the Israeli-Palestinian conflict. London: Zed. ISBN 978-1-85649-580-6.
- Harms, Gregory; Ferry, Todd M. (2005). The Palestine-Israel conflict: a basic introduction (1. publ ed.). London: Pluto Press. ISBN 978-0-7453-2378-7.
- Karmi, Ghada (2007). Married to another man: Israel's dilemma in Palestine. London; Ann Arbor, MI: Pluto Press. ISBN 978-0-7453-2065-6. OCLC 154769365.
- Karsh, Efraim (2007-12-01). Arafat's War: The Man and His Battle for Israeli Conquest. Open Road + Grove/Atlantic. ISBN 978-1-55584-660-2.
- Kimmerling, Baruch (2008). Clash of Identities: Explorations in Israeli and Palestinian Societies. Columbia University Press. ISBN 978-0-231-14329-5.
- Masalha, Nur (2003). The Politics of Denial: Israel and the Palestinian Refugee Problem. Pluto Press. doi:10.2307/j.ctt18dztmq. ISBN 978-0-7453-2120-2. JSTOR j.ctt18dztmq.
- Meital, Yoram (2006). Peace in Tatters: Israel, Palestine, and the Middle East. Lynne Rienner Publishers. ISBN 978-1-58826-362-9.
- Paul Scham; Walid Salem; Benjamin Pogrund, eds. (2005). Shared Histories: A Palestinian–Israeli Dialogue. Left Coast Press. p. 298. ISBN 978-1-59874-013-4.
- Pearlman, Wendy (2003). Occupied voices: stories of everyday life from the second Intifada. New York : [Berkeley, Calif.]: Thunder's Mouth Press/Nation Books; Distributed by Publisher's Group West. ISBN 978-1-56025-530-7.
- Reinhart, Tanya (2002). Israel/Palestine: how to end the War of 1948. An open media book (Seven Stories Press 1st ed.). New York: Seven Stories Press. ISBN 978-1-58322-538-7.
- Robert I. Rotberg, ed. (2006). Israeli and Palestinian Narratives of Conflict: History's Double Helix. Indiana University Press. p. 283. ISBN 978-0-253-21857-5.
- Rubenberg, Cheryl, ed. (2010). Encyclopedia of the Israeli-Palestinian conflict. Boulder, Colo: Lynne Rienner Publishers. ISBN 978-1-58826-686-6.
- Segal, Rafi (2003). A Civilian Occupation: The Politics of Israeli Architecture. Verso Books. ISBN 978-1-85984-549-3.
- Shlaim, Avi (2009). Israel and Palestine: Reappraisals, Revisions, Refutations. Verso Books. ISBN 978-1-78960-165-7.
- Tessler, Mark (2009-03-24). A History of the Israeli-Palestinian Conflict. Indiana University Press. ISBN 978-0-253-01346-0.
- Tilley, Virginia (2005). The one-state solution: a breakthrough for peace in the Israeli-Palestinian deadlock. Ann Arbor: University of Michigan Press. ISBN 978-0-472-11513-6.
- Wasserstein, Bernard (2004). Israelis and Palestinians: Why Do They Fight? Can They Stop?. Yale University Press. ISBN 978-0-300-10597-1.

=== Israeli–Palestinian conflict (20th century) ===
- Chomsky, Noam (1983). The fateful triangle: the United States, Israel, and the Palestinians (1st ed.). Boston, MA: South End Press. ISBN 978-0-89608-188-8.
- Hirst, David (1977). The Gun and the Olive Branch: The Roots of Violence in the Middle East. PublicAffairs. ISBN 978-1-56025-483-6.
- Ilan Pappé, ed. (1999). The Israel/Palestine Question, Rewriting histories. Psychology Press. p. 278. ISBN 978-0-415-16948-6.

== Palestine ==
=== Palestine (2020s) ===
- Abdallah, Stéphanie Latte (29 August 2022). A History of Confinement in Palestine: The Prison Web. Springer. ISBN 978-3-031-08709-7.
- Allan, Diana (2021). Voices of the Nakba: A Living History of Palestine. Pluto Press. ISBN 978-0-7453-4292-4.
- Allen, Lori (15 December 2020). A History of False Hope: Investigative Commissions in Palestine. Stanford University Press. ISBN 978-1-5036-1419-2.
- Bawalsa, Nadim (26 July 2022). Transnational Palestine: Migration and the Right of Return before 1948. Stanford University Press. ISBN 978-1-5036-3227-1.
- Bhungalia, Lisa (12 December 2023). Elastic Empire: Refashioning War through Aid in Palestine. Stanford University Press. ISBN 978-1-5036-3752-8.
- Brown, Rachel H. (24 June 2024). Unsettled Labors: Migrant Care Work in Palestine/Israel. Duke University Press. ISBN 978-1-4780-5958-5.
- Cohen, Michael J. (18 February 2020). The British Mandate in Palestine: A Centenary Volume, 1920–2020. Routledge. ISBN 978-0-429-64048-3.
- Divine, Donna Robinson (2023). Politics and Society in Ottoman Palestine: The Arab Struggle for Survival and Power. Lynne Rienner Publishers. ISBN 978-1-68585-958-9.
- Farsakh, Leila H. (26 October 2021). Rethinking Statehood in Palestine: Self-Determination and Decolonization Beyond Partition. Univ of California Press. ISBN 978-0-520-38563-4.
- Golańska, Dorota (22 November 2022). Slow Urbicide: A New Materialist Account of Political Violence in Palestine. Taylor & Francis. ISBN 978-1-000-77386-6.
- Greenwald, Diana B. (14 May 2024). Mayors in the Middle: Indirect Rule and Local Government in Occupied Palestine. Columbia University Press. ISBN 978-0-231-55974-4.
- Hazkani, Shay (13 April 2021). Dear Palestine: A Social History of the 1948 War. Stanford University Press. ISBN 978-1-5036-2766-6.
- Hyamson, Albert M. (June 2022). Palestine: A Policy. Taylor & Francis. ISBN 978-1-000-62351-2.
- Iqtait, Anas (2023). Funding and the Quest for Sovereignty in Palestine. Springer. ISBN 978-3-031-19479-5.
- Kessler, Oren (15 February 2023). Palestine 1936: The Great Revolt and the Roots of the Middle East Conflict. Rowman & Littlefield. ISBN 978-1-5381-4881-5.
- Khalidi, Rashid (2020). The Hundred Years' War on Palestine: A History of Settler Colonialism and Resistance, 1917–2017. Metropolitan Books. ISBN 978-1-62779-854-9.
- Kurd, Dana El (15 January 2020). Polarized and Demobilized: Legacies of Authoritarianism in Palestine. Oxford University Press. ISBN 978-0-19-009586-4.
- Leuenberger, Christine; Schnell, Izhak (2020). The Politics of Maps: Cartographic Constructions of Israel/Palestine. Oxford University Press. ISBN 978-0-19-007623-8.
- Pappe, Ilan (2022) [2004]. A History of Modern Palestine (3rd ed.). Cambridge University Press. ISBN 978-1-108-24416-9.
- Porath, Yehoshua (18 August 2020). The Emergence of the Palestinian-Arab National Movement, 1918-1929 (RLE Israel and Palestine). Routledge. ISBN 978-1-000-15608-9.
- Pruszyński, Ksawery (2 March 2021). Palestine for the Third Time. Academic Studies Press. ISBN 978-1-64469-479-4.
- Rabie, Kareem (29 March 2021). Palestine is Throwing a Party and the Whole World is Invited: Capital and State Building in the West Bank. Duke University Press. ISBN 978-1-4780-2140-7.
- Rickard, Joshua (24 February 2022). The Fragmentation of Palestine: Identity and Isolation since the Second Intifada. Bloomsbury. ISBN 978-0-7556-4552-7.
- Sa'Di, Ahmad H.; Masalha, Nur (15 June 2023). Decolonizing the Study of Palestine: Indigenous Perspectives and Settler Colonialism after Elia Zureik. Bloomsbury. ISBN 978-0-7556-4831-3.
- Segal, Jerome M. (17 May 2022). The Olive Branch from Palestine: The Palestinian Declaration of Independence and the Path Out of the Current Impasse. Univ of California Press. ISBN 978-0-520-38131-5.
- Sen, Somdeep (15 December 2020). Decolonizing Palestine: Hamas between the Anticolonial and the Postcolonial. Cornell University Press. ISBN 978-1-5017-5275-9.
- Shaindlinger, Noa (August 2023). Displacement and Erasure in Palestine: The Politics of Hope. Edinburgh University Press. ISBN 978-1-4744-8972-0.
- Shambrook, Peter (3 August 2023). Policy of Deceit: Britain and Palestine, 1914-1939. Simon and Schuster. ISBN 978-0-86154-633-6.
- Singh, Subhash (29 July 2021). The Second Partition of Palestine: Hamas–Fatah Struggle for Power. Taylor & Francis. ISBN 978-1-000-41138-6.
- Tartir, Alaa; Dana, Tariq; Seidel, Timothy (18 May 2021). Political Economy of Palestine: Critical, Interdisciplinary, and Decolonial Perspectives. Springer. ISBN 978-3-030-68643-7.
- Tartir, Alaa; Seidel, Timothy; Daʻnā, Ṭāriq (2024). Resisting Domination in Palestine: Mechanisms and Techniques of Control, Coloniality and Settler Colonialism. I. B. Tauris. ISBN 978-0-7556-5086-6.
- Turnberg, Leslie (2021). Mandate: The Palestine Crucible, 1919-1939. Valentine Mitchell. ISBN 978-1-912676-67-5.

=== Palestine (2010s) ===
- Hughes, Matthew (2019-01-03). Britain's Pacification of Palestine: The British Army, the Colonial State, and the Arab Revolt, 1936–1939. Cambridge University Press. ISBN 978-1-107-10320-7.
- Karsh, Efrayim (2010). Palestine betrayed. New Haven London: Yale University Press. ISBN 978-0-300-17234-8.
- Krämer, Gudrun (2011). A History of Palestine: From the Ottoman Conquest to the Founding of the State of Israel. Princeton University Press. ISBN 978-0-691-15007-9.
- Masalha, Nur (2018). Palestine: A Four Thousand Year History. Zed Books. ISBN 978-1-78699-275-8.
- Rogan, Eugene (2017) [2009]. The Arabs: A History (Revised and updated ed.). Basic Books. ISBN 978-0-465-03248-8.

=== Palestine (2000s) ===
- Bernstein, Deborah (2000). Constructing Boundaries: Jewish and Arab Workers in Mandatory Palestine. State University of New York Press. doi:10.1353/book10957. ISBN 978-0-7914-9275-8.
- Morris, Benny (2004) [1988]. The Birth of the Palestinian Refugee Problem Revisited (2nd ed.). Cambridge University Press. ISBN 978-0-521-00967-6.
- Parsons, Nigel (7 June 2005). The Politics of the Palestinian Authority: From Oslo to Al-Aqsa. Routledge. ISBN 978-1-135-94522-0.
- Schulz, Helena Lindholm (2003). The Palestinian Diaspora: Formation of Identities and Politics of Homeland. Routledge. ISBN 978-0-415-26821-9.

=== Palestine (20th century) ===
- Cattan, Henry (1988). The Palestine Question. Routledge. ISBN 978-1-003-32577-2.
- Azar, George Baramki (January 1991). Palestine: A Photographic Journey. University of California Press. ISBN 978-0-520-07544-3.
- Said, Edward W. (1992). The question of Palestine. New York: Vintage Books. ISBN 978-0-679-73988-3.
- Hadawi, Sami (1991). Bitter harvest: a modern history of Palestine (4th rev. and updated ed.). New York: Olive Branch Press. ISBN 978-0-940793-81-1.

== Israel ==
=== Israel (2020s) ===
- Ariely, Gal (2021). Israel's Regime Untangled: Between Democracy and Apartheid. Cambridge University Press. ISBN 978-1-108-96042-7.
- Ben-Porat, Guy; Feniger, Yariv; Filc, Dani; Kabalo, Paula; Mirsky, Julia, eds. (2022). Routledge Handbook on Contemporary Israel. Routledge. ISBN 978-1-000-59119-4.
- Bick, Etta (December 2020). Citizenship and Service: The Politics of Civic National Service in Israel. State University of New York Press. ISBN 978-1-4384-8096-1.
- Boehm, Omri (2021). Haifa Republic: A Democratic Future for Israel. New York Review Books. ISBN 978-1-68137-394-2.
- Brenner, Michael (2020-03-24). In Search of Israel: The History of an Idea. Princeton University Press. ISBN 978-0-691-20397-3.
- Cohen, Saul B. (28 January 2020). The Geopolitics of Israel's Border Question. Routledge. ISBN 978-1-000-30182-3.
- Friedman, Elie; Neubauer-Shani, Michal; Scham, Paul, eds. (2023). Polarization and Consensus-Building in Israel: The Center Cannot Hold. Routledge. ISBN 978-1-000-87468-6.
- Goodman, Micah (10 November 2020). The Wondering Jew: Israel and the Search for Jewish Identity. Yale University Press. ISBN 978-0-300-25599-7.
- Gilbert, Martin (2020). The Story of Israel: From Theodor Herzl to the Dream for Peace. Carlton Books, Limited. ISBN 978-1-78739-407-0.
- Hazan, Reuven Y.; Dowty, Alan; Hofnung, Menachem; Rahat, Gideon, eds. (2021). The Oxford Handbook of Israeli Politics and Society. Oxford University Press. ISBN 978-0-19-067558-5.
- Horowitz, Michael A. (8 March 2024). Hope and Despair: Israel's Future in the New Middle East. Hurst Publishers. ISBN 978-1-80526-180-3.
- Jamal, Amal (August 2020). Reconstructing the Civic: Palestinian Civil Activism in Israel. State University of New York Press. ISBN 978-1-4384-7873-9.
- Kedar, Nir; Watzman, Haim (2021). David Ben-Gurion and the Foundation of Israeli Democracy. Indiana University Press. ISBN 978-0-253-05747-1. JSTOR j.ctv21hrjmd.
- Kenedy, Robert A.; Rebhun, Uzi; Ehrlich, Carl S., eds. (2022). Israel and the Diaspora: Jewish Connectivity in a Changing World. Springer Nature. ISBN 978-3-030-80872-3.
- Kershner, Isabel (16 May 2023). The Land of Hope and Fear: Israel's Battle for Its Inner Soul. Knopf Doubleday Publishing. ISBN 978-1-101-94677-0.
- Lecoquierre, Marion (18 November 2021). Emplaced Resistance in Palestine and Israel: The Cases of Hebron, Silwan and al-Araqib. Routledge. ISBN 978-1-351-36978-7.
- Moss, Kenneth B.; Nathans, Benjamin; Tsurumi, Taro, eds. (2022). From Europe's East to the Middle East: Israel's Russian and Polish Lineages. University of Pennsylvania Press. ISBN 978-0-8122-5309-2.
- Penkower, Monty Noam (5 October 2021). Israel: As a Phoenix Ascending. Academic Studies Press. ISBN 978-1-64469-677-4.
- Scheindlin, Dahlia (18 September 2023). The Crooked Timber of Democracy in Israel: Promise Unfulfilled. Walter de Gruyter GmbH & Co KG. ISBN 978-3-11-079658-2.
- Sher-Hadar, Neta; Lahat, Lihi; Galnoor, Itzhak, eds. (2020). Collaborative Governance: Theory and Lessons from Israel. Springer Nature. ISBN 978-3-030-45807-2.
- Yadgar, Yaacov (30 January 2020). Israel's Jewish Identity Crisis: State and Politics in the Middle East. Cambridge University Press. ISBN 978-1-108-48894-5.
- Zertal, Idith (22 December 2023). From Catastrophe to Power: The Holocaust Survivors and the Emergence of Israel. University of California Press. ISBN 978-0-520-92171-9.
- Ziv, Guy (18 January 2024). The Generals vs Netanyahu: The Battle for Israel's Future. Cambridge University Press. ISBN 978-1-009-42569-8.

=== Israel (2010s) ===
- Avieli, Nir (2017-11-28). Food and power a culinary ethnography of Israel. University of California Press. doi:10.1525/california/9780520290099.001.0001. ISBN 978-0-520-29009-9.
- Ben-Rafael, Eliezer; Schoeps, Julius H.; Sternberg, Yitzhak; Glöckner, Olaf; Weberling, Anne, eds. (2016). Handbook of Israel: Major Debates. De Gruyter. ISBN 978-3-11-038338-6.
- Bier, Jess (2017-06-23). Mapping Israel, Mapping Palestine. The MIT Press. doi:10.7551/mitpress/9780262036153.001.0001. ISBN 978-0-262-03615-3.
- Cleveland, William L.; Bunton, Martin (2016). A History of the Modern Middle East (6th ed.). Westview Press. ISBN 978-0-429-97513-4.
- Cohen-Almagor, Raphael (2013-09-13). Israeli Democracy at the Crossroads. Routledge. ISBN 978-1-134-26884-9.
- Dieckhoff, Alain, ed. (2013). Routledge Handbook of Modern Israel. Routledge. ISBN 978-1-138-38295-4.
- Galnoor, Itzhak; Blander, Dana (2018). The Handbook of Israel's Political System. Cambridge University Press. ISBN 978-1-108-54705-5.
- Gilbert, Martin (2014-06-05). Israel: A History. Rosetta Books. ISBN 978-0-7953-3740-6.
- Goldscheider, Calvin (2015). Israeli society in the twenty-first century: immigration, inequality, and religious conflict. The Schusterman series in Israel studies. Waltham, Massachusetts: Brandeis University Press. ISBN 978-1-61168-746-0.
- Gordis, Daniel (2016-10-18). Israel: A Concise History of a Nation Reborn. HarperCollins. ISBN 978-0-06-236876-8.
- Gowans, Stephen (2019). Israel, a Beachhead in the Middle East: From European Colony to US Power Projection Platform. Baraka Books. ISBN 978-1-77186-183-0.
- Kaplan, Eran; Penslar, Derek J. (2011-12-01). The Origins of Israel, 1882–1948: A Documentary History. University of Wisconsin Pres. ISBN 978-0-299-28493-0.
- Pappe, Ilan (2017). Ten Myths About Israel. Verso Books. ISBN 978-1-78663-020-9.
- Rabinovitch, Simon (2018-11-12). Defining Israel: The Jewish State, Democracy, and the Law. Hebrew Union College Press. ISBN 978-0-87820-163-1.
- Ram, Uri (2010). Israeli Nationalism: Social conflicts and the politics of knowledge. Routledge. ISBN 978-1-136-91994-7.
- Rozin, Orit; Watzman, Haim (2016). A Home for All Jews: Citizenship, Rights, and National Identity in the New Israeli State. Brandeis University Press. ISBN 978-1-61168-949-5. JSTOR j.ctv102bftk.
- Rubin, Barry M. (2012). Israel: an introduction. New Haven: Yale Univ. Press. ISBN 978-0-300-16230-1.
- Shapira, Anita (2012). Israel: A History. UPNE. ISBN 978-1-61168-353-0.
- Shavit, Ari (2013-11-19). My Promised Land: The Triumph and Tragedy of Israel. Random House Publishing Group. ISBN 978-0-8129-8464-4.
- Shilon, Avi (12 December 2019). The Decline of the Left Wing in Israel: Yossi Beilin and the Politics of the Peace Process. Bloomsbury. ISBN 978-1-83860-115-7.
- Shindler, Colin (2013-03-25). A History of Modern Israel. Cambridge University Press. ISBN 978-1-107-31121-3.
- Israeli Cinema. University of Texas Press. 2011. doi:10.7560/725607. ISBN 978-0-292-73560-6.
- Weinblum, Sharon (2015-01-30). Security and Defensive Democracy in Israel: A Critical Approach to Political Discourse. Routledge. ISBN 978-1-317-58450-6.

=== Israel (2000s) ===
- Adelman, Jonathan (2008-03-25). The Rise of Israel: A History of a Revolutionary State. Routledge. ISBN 978-1-135-97413-8.
- Almog, Oz (2000). The Sabra: the creation of the new Jew. The S. Mark Taper Foundation imprint in Jewish studies. Berkeley: University of California Press. ISBN 978-0-520-21642-6.
- Attias, Jean-Christophe; Benbassa, Esther (2003). Israel, the Impossible Land. Stanford University Press. ISBN 978-0-8047-4166-8.
- Dershowitz, Alan (2003-08-08). The Case for Israel. Wiley. ISBN 978-0-471-46502-7.
- Diskin, Abraham (March 2003). The Last Days in Israel: Understanding the New Israeli Democracy. Routledge. ISBN 978-1-135-75945-2.
- Hasan-Rokem, Galit; Shilo, Margalit; Kark, Ruth, eds. (2008). Jewish Women in Pre-State Israel: Life History, Politics, and Culture. Brandeis University Press. doi:10.2307/j.ctv1k03srv. ISBN 978-1-58465-702-6. JSTOR j.ctv1k03srv.
- Morris, Benny, ed. (2007). Making Israel. University of Michigan Press. ISBN 978-0-472-02652-4.
- Penslar, Derek (2007-01-24). Israel in History: The Jewish State in Comparative Perspective. Routledge. ISBN 978-1-134-14668-0.
- Reich, Bernard (2008). A Brief History of Israel. Infobase Publishing. ISBN 978-1-4381-0826-1.
- Shapira, Anita; Penslar, Derek J., eds. (2003). Israeli Historical Revisionism: From Left to Right. Routledge. ISBN 978-1-135-31850-5.
- Safran, Nadav (2009-07-01). Israel, the Embattled Ally: With a New Preface and a Postscript by the Author. Harvard University Press. ISBN 978-0-674-04303-9.
- Stein, Leslie (2003-03-30). The Hope Fulfilled: The Rise of Modern Israel. Bloomsbury Publishing USA. ISBN 978-0-313-03909-6.
- Yiftachel, Oren (2006). Ethnocracy: Land and Identity Politics in Israel/Palestine. University of Pennsylvania Press. ISBN 978-0-8122-3927-0.

=== Israel (20th century) ===
- Ben-Meir, Yehuda (1995). Civil-military Relations in Israel. Columbia University Press. ISBN 978-0-231-09684-3.
- Flapan, Simha (1987). The Birth of Israel: Myths and Realities. Pantheon Books. ISBN 978-0-394-55588-1.
- Halpern, Ben (1969). The Idea of the Jewish State. Harvard University Press. ISBN 978-0-674-44201-6.
- Lucas, Noah (1975). The Modern History of Israel. Praeger. ISBN 978-0-275-33450-5.
- Peleg, Ilan; Seliktar, Ofira (1989). The Emergence of a Binational Israel: The Second Republic in the Making. Routledge. ISBN 978-0-429-31043-0.
- Safran, Nadav (1991). The United States and Israel. Harvard University Press.
- Sykes, Christopher (1973). Crossroads to Israel. A Midland book, MB-165. Bloomington: Indiana University Press. ISBN 978-0-253-20165-2.
- Thomas, Baylis (1999). How Israel was Won: A Concise History of the Arab-Israeli Conflict. Lexington Books. ISBN 978-0-7391-0064-6.
- Yaniv, Avner (1993). National Security and Democracy in Israel. Lynne Rienner Publishers. ISBN 978-1-55587-394-3.

== Focused/specialized ==
=== Zionism ===
==== Zionism (2020s) ====
- Baji, Tomohito (2021). The International Thought of Alfred Zimmern: Classicism, Zionism and the Shadow of Commonwealth. Springer Nature. ISBN 978-3-030-66214-1.
- Blackmer, Corinne E. (2022). Queering Anti-Zionism: Academic Freedom, LGBTQ Intellectuals, and Israel/Palestine Campus Activism. Wayne State University Press. ISBN 978-0-8143-5000-3.
- Cohen, Netta (2024). New Under the Sun: Early Zionist Encounters with the Climate in Palestine. Univ of California Press. ISBN 978-0-520-39723-1.
- Conforti, Yitzhak (2024). Zionism and Jewish Culture. Academic Studies Press. ISBN 979-8-88719-637-4.
- Etkes, Immanuel (2023). The Invention of a Tradition: The Messianic Zionism of the Gaon of Vilna. Stanford University Press. ISBN 978-1-5036-3709-2.
- Farmer, Esther; Petchesky, Rosalind Pollack; Sills, Sarah (2021). A Land With a People: Palestinians and Jews Confront Zionism. NYU Press. ISBN 978-1-58367-931-9.
- Feld, Marjorie N. (2024). The threshold of dissent: a history of American Jewish critics of Zionism. Goldstein-Goren series in American Jewish history. New York: New York University Press. ISBN 978-1-4798-2931-6.
- Fleisch, Eric (2024). Checkbook Zionism: Philanthropy and Power in the Israel-Diaspora Relationship. Rutgers University Press. doi:10.36019/9781978819986. ISBN 978-1-9788-1998-6.
- Forriol, Mari Carmen (2023). Development of the Roadmap of Political Zionism in the State of Israel. Cambridge Scholars Publishing. ISBN 978-1-5275-1260-3.
- Goldwater, Raymond (2020). Pioneers of Religious Zionism: Rabbis Alkalai, Kalischer, Mohliver, Reines, Kook and Maimon. Urim Publications. ISBN 978-965-524-343-7.
- Halper, Jeff (2021). Decolonizing Israel, Liberating Palestine: Zionism, Settler Colonialism, and the Case for One Democratic State. Pluto Press. doi:10.2307/j.ctv1dm8d20. ISBN 978-0-7453-4339-6.
- Halperin, Liora R. (2021). The Oldest Guard: Forging the Zionist Settler Past. Stanford University Press. ISBN 978-1-5036-2871-7.
- Hever, Hannan (2023). Hasidism, Haskalah, Zionism. University of Pennsylvania Press. doi:10.2307/j.ctv30dxxs8. ISBN 978-1-5128-2508-4.
- Inbari, Motti; Bumin, Kirill (2024). Christian Zionism in the Twenty-First Century: American Evangelical Opinion on Israel. Oxford University Press. ISBN 978-0-19-764930-5.
- Knorr, Brooke (2022). American Biblical Archaeology and Zionism. Routledge. doi:10.4324/b22935. ISBN 978-1-003-29629-4.
- Landes, Richard (2020). Salem on the Thames: Moral Panic, Anti-Zionism, and the Triumph of Hate Speech at Connecticut College. Academic Studies PRess. ISBN 978-1-64469-370-4.
- Levit, Daphna (2020). Wrestling with Zionism: Jewish Voices of Dissent. Interlink Publishing Group Incorporated. ISBN 978-1-62371-949-4.
- Lewis, Donald M. (2021). A Short History of Christian Zionism: From the Reformation to the Twenty-First Century. InterVarsity Press. ISBN 978-0-8308-4698-6.
- Penslar, Derek J. (2023). Zionism: An Emotional State. Rutgers University Press. ISBN 978-0-8135-7611-4.
- Peretz, Dekel (2022). Zionism and Cosmopolitanism: Franz Oppenheimer and the Dream of a Jewish Future in Germany and Palestine. Walter de Gruyter GmbH & Co KG. ISBN 978-3-11-072643-5.
- Perez, Anne (2023-05-23). Understanding Zionism: History and Perspectives. Fortress Press. ISBN 978-1-5064-8117-3.
- Reynold, Nick (2021). The 1945–1952 British Government's Opposition to Zionism and the Emergent State of Israel. Rowman & Littlefield. ISBN 978-1-7936-2926-5.
- Rich, Cynthia Holder (2021). Christian Zionism in Africa. Rowman & Littlefield. ISBN 978-1-9787-1174-7.
- Shain, Yossi (2021-11-02). The Israeli Century: How the Zionist Revolution Changed History and Reinvented Judaism. Wicked Son. ISBN 978-1-64293-846-3.
- Shindler, Colin (2024). Routledge Handbook on Zionism. Taylor & Francis. ISBN 978-1-040-02564-2.
- Shoham, Hizky (2020). Carnival in Tel Aviv: Purim and the Celebration of Urban Zionism. Academic Studies Press. doi:10.2307/j.ctv2175qt0. ISBN 978-1-64469-328-5. JSTOR j.ctv2175qt0.
- Tarquini, Alessandra (2021). The European Left and the Jewish Question, 1848-1992: Between Zionism and Antisemitism. Springer Nature. ISBN 978-3-030-56662-3.
- Vogt, Stefan; Penslar, Derek Jonathan; Saposnik, Arieh Bruce, eds. (2023). Unacknowledged kinships: postcolonial studies and the historiography of Zionism. The Tauber Institute series for the study of European Jewry. Waltham: Brandeis University Press. ISBN 978-1-68458-154-2.
- Zakai, Orian (15 June 2023). Fictions of Gender: Women, Femininity, and the Zionist Imagination. McGill-Queen's Press - MQUP. ISBN 978-0-2280-1828-5.
- Zipperstein, Steven E. (2021). Zionism, Palestinian Nationalism and the Law: 1939-1948. Routledge. ISBN 978-1-000-48438-0.

==== Zionism (2010s) ====
- Amar-Dahl, Tamar (2016-11-04). Zionist Israel and the Question of Palestine. De Gruyter. doi:10.1515/9783110498806. ISBN 978-3-11-049880-6.
- Balfour, Alan (2018-12-28). The Walls of Jerusalem. Wiley. doi:10.1002/9781119182320. ISBN 978-1-119-18229-0.
- Berman, Aaron (2018). Nazism, The Jews and American Zionism, 1933-1948. Wayne State University Press. doi:10.1353/book.61461. ISBN 978-0-8143-4403-3.
- Brenner, Michael (2011). Zionism: A Brief History. Markus Wiener Publishers. ISBN 978-1-55876-535-1.
- Cohen-Hattab, Kobi (2019-07-08). Zionism's Maritime Revolution: The Yishuv's Hold on the Land of Israel's Sea and Shores, 1917–1948. Walter de Gruyter GmbH & Co KG. ISBN 978-3-11-063352-8.
- Cohn-Sherbok, Dan (2011-11-17). Introduction to Zionism and Israel: From Ideology to History. Bloomsbury Publishing. ISBN 978-1-4411-3944-3.
- Davids, Stanley M.; Englander, Lawrence A., eds. (2017). The fragile dialogue: new voices of liberal Zionism. New York, NY: Central Conference of American Rabbis. ISBN 978-0-88123-305-6.
- Eisen, Robert (2011). The peace and violence of Judaism: from the Bible to modern Zionism. New York: Oxford University Press. ISBN 978-0-19-975147-1. OCLC 642849423.
- Engel, David (2013) [2009]. Zionism. Routledge. ISBN 978-1-317-86548-3.
- Gans, Chaim (2016). A Political Theory for the Jewish People. Oxford University Press. ISBN 978-0-19-023754-7.
- Gitelman, Zvi, ed. (2003-03-16). The Emergence Of Modern Jewish Politics: Bundism And Zionism In Eastern Europe. University of Pittsburgh Press. doi:10.2307/j.ctvt1shmt. ISBN 978-0-8229-7069-9.
- Gribetz, Jonathan Marc (2014-09-22). Defining Neighbors: Religion, Race, and the Early Zionist-Arab Encounter. Princeton University Press. ISBN 978-1-4008-5265-9.
- Harel, Yaron (2015-02-18). Zionism in Damascus: Ideology and Activity in the Jewish Community at the Beginning of the Twentieth Century. Bloomsbury Academic. ISBN 978-1-78076-670-6.
- Heller, Daniel Kupfert (2017). Jabotinsky's children: Polish Jews and the rise of right-wing Zionism. Princeton: Princeton University Press. ISBN 978-0-691-17475-4.
- Katz, Ethan B.; Leff, Lisa Moses; Mandel, Maud S. (2017-01-30). Colonialism and the Jews. Indiana University Press. ISBN 978-0-253-02462-6.
- Linfield, Susie (2019). The lions' den: Zionism and the left from Hannah Arendt to Noam Chomsky. New Haven (Conn.): Yale university press. ISBN 978-0-300-22298-2.
- Masalha, Nur (2014). The Zionist Bible: Biblical Precedent, Colonialism and the Erasure of Memory. Routledge. ISBN 978-1-317-54464-7.
- Medoff, Rafael; Waxman, Chaim I., eds. (2013-09-05). Historical Dictionary of Zionism. Routledge. doi:10.4324/9781315063379. ISBN 978-1-135-96642-3.
- Novak, David (2015-03-09). Zionism and Judaism: A New Theory. Cambridge University Press. ISBN 978-1-316-24122-6.
- Olson, Jess (2013-01-09). Nathan Birnbaum and Jewish Modernity: Architect of Zionism, Yiddishism, and Orthodoxy. Stanford University Press. ISBN 978-0-8047-8500-6.
- Pianko, Noam (2010-06-03). Zionism and the Roads Not Taken: Rawidowicz, Kaplan, Kohn. Indiana University Press. ISBN 978-0-253-00430-7.
- Rosenfeld, Gavriel D. (2016). Rosenfeld, Gavriel D. (ed.). What Ifs of Jewish History: From Abraham to Zionism. Cambridge: Cambridge University Press. doi:10.1017/9781139794718. ISBN 978-1-107-03762-5.
- Rotenstreich, Nathan (2012-02-01). Zionism: Past and Present. State University of New York Press. ISBN 978-0-7914-7975-9.
- Sachar, Howard M. (2013). A History of Israel: From the Rise of Zionism to Our Time. Knopf Doubleday Publishing Group. ISBN 978-0-8041-5049-1.
- Salmon, Yosef (2013-11-15). Do Not Provoke Providence: Orthodoxy in the Grip of Nationalism. Academic Studies Press. doi:10.1515/9781618110725. ISBN 978-1-61811-072-5.
- Sasson, Theodore (2020-06-02). The New American Zionism. New York University Press. doi:10.18574/nyu/9780814760864.001.0001. ISBN 978-0-8147-6011-6.
- Shindler, Colin (2015-06-04). What Do Zionists Believe?. Granta Books. ISBN 978-1-78378-248-2.
- Shumsky, Dmitry (2018-10-23). Beyond the Nation-State: The Zionist Political Imagination from Pinsker to Ben-Gurion. Yale University Press. ISBN 978-0-300-24109-9.
- Sicker, Martin (2019-03-04). Judaism, Nationalism, And The Land Of Israel. Routledge. ISBN 978-0-429-72263-9.
- Stanislawski, Michael (2017). Zionism: A Very Short Introduction. Very Short Introductions. Oxford University Press. ISBN 978-0-19-976604-8.
- Sternfeld, Lior B. (2019). Between Iran and Zion: Jewish histories of twentieth-century Iran. Stanford (Calif.): Stanford University Press. ISBN 978-1-5036-1363-8.
- Troy, Gil (2018). The Zionist Ideas: Visions for the Jewish Homeland—Then, Now, Tomorrow. University of Nebraska Press. doi:10.2307/j.ctt21c4vgn. ISBN 978-0-8276-1255-6. JSTOR j.ctt21c4vgn.
- Viorst, Milton (2016-07-05). Zionism. New York: Macmillan. ISBN 978-1-4668-9032-9.
- Yadgar, Yaacov (2017). Sovereign Jews: Israel, Zionism, and Judaism. Albany (N.Y.): State university of New York press. ISBN 978-1-4384-6533-3.

==== Zionism (2000s) ====
- Alam, M. (2009-11-09). Israeli Exceptionalism: The Destabilizing Logic of Zionism. Springer. ISBN 978-0-230-10137-1.
- Berkowitz, Michael, ed. (2004-01-01). Nationalism, Zionism and Ethnic Mobilization of the Jews in 1900 and Beyond. BRILL. doi:10.1163/9789047402435. ISBN 978-90-04-13184-2.
- Dieckhoff, Alain (2003). The Invention of a Nation: Zionist Thought and the Making of Modern Israel. Columbia University Press. ISBN 978-0-231-12766-0.
- Edelheit, Hershel (2000). History Of Zionism: A Handbook And Dictionary. Routledge. ISBN 978-0-429-70103-0.
- Friling, Tuvia (2005-07-25). Arrows in the Dark (Volumes 1 and 2): David Ben-Gurion, the Yishuv Leadership, and Rescue Attempts during the Holocaust. Univ of Wisconsin Press. ISBN 978-0-299-17553-5.
- Gans, Chaim (2008-06-23). A Just Zionism: On the Morality of the Jewish State. Oxford University Press, USA. ISBN 978-0-19-534068-6.
- Gilbert, Martin (2008-09-02). Churchill and the Jews: A Lifelong Friendship. Macmillan + ORM. ISBN 978-1-4668-2962-6.
- Goldberg, David (2009). To the Promised Land: A History of Zionist Thought from Its Origins to the Modern State of Israel. Faber & Faber, Limited. ISBN 978-0-571-25423-1.
- Kaplan, Eran (2005-03-14). The Jewish Radical Right: Revisionist Zionism and Its Ideological Legacy. Univ of Wisconsin Press. ISBN 978-0-299-20383-2.
- Laqueur, Walter (2003). A history of Zionism: from French Revolution to the establishment of the State of Israel. New York: Schocken Books. ISBN 978-0-8052-1149-8.
- Makovsky, Michael (2007). Churchill's Promised Land: Zionism and Statecraft. Yale University Press. ISBN 978-0-300-14324-9.
- Masalha, Nur (2007). The Bible and Zionism: Invented Traditions, Archaeology and Post-Colonialism in Palestine-Israel. Zed Books. ISBN 978-1-84277-761-9.
- Morgenstern, Arie (2006-06-22). Hastening Redemption: Messianism and the Resettlement of the Land of Israel. Oxford University Press. ISBN 978-0-19-804166-5.
- Ratzabi, Shalom (2001-12-20), "Between Zionism and Judaism: The Radical Circle in Brith Shalom 1925-1933", Between Zionism and Judaism, Brill, ISBN 978-90-04-50134-8
- Rubinstein, Amnon (2000). From Herzl to Rabin: The Changing Image of Zionism. Holmes & Meier. ISBN 978-0-8419-1408-7.
- Schwartz, Dov (2009). Religious-Zionism: History and Ideology. Academic Studies Press. ISBN 978-1-934843-26-0.
- Shamir, Ronen (2000). The Colonies of Law: Colonialism, Zionism and Law in Early Mandate Palestine. Cambridge University Press. ISBN 978-0-521-63183-9.
- Stanislawski, Michael (2001). Zionism and the Fin de Siecle: Cosmopolitanism and Nationalism from Nordau to Jabotinsky. University of California Press. ISBN 978-0-520-93575-4.
- Sufian, Sandra M. (2007). Healing the Land and the Nation: Malaria and the Zionist Project in Palestine, 1920-1947. University of Chicago Press. ISBN 978-0-226-77938-6.
- Zakim, Eric Stephen (2006). To build and be built: landscape, literature, and the construction of Zionist identity. Jewish culture and contexts. Philadelphia: University of Pennsylvania Press. ISBN 978-0-8122-3903-4. OCLC 60603306.

==== Zionism (20th century) ====
- Adler, Joseph (1997). Restoring the Jews to their homeland: nineteen centuries in the quest for Zion. Northvale, N.J: J. Aronson. ISBN 978-1-56821-978-3.
- Avineri, Shlomo (1984-03-06). The making of modern Zionism : intellectual origins of the Jewish state. Basic Books. ISBN 978-0-465-04331-6.
- Cohen, Mitchell (1992). Zion and State: Nation, Class, and the Shaping of Modern Israel. Columbia University Press. ISBN 978-0-231-07941-9.
- Flapan, Simha (1979). Zionism and the Palestinians. Croom Helm. ISBN 978-0-06-492104-6.
- Galnoor, Itzhak (1995-01-01). The Partition of Palestine: Decision Crossroads in the Zionist Movement. SUNY Press. ISBN 978-0-7914-2194-9.
- Gurock, Jeffrey S. (1998). American Zionism: Mission and Politics. Taylor & Francis. ISBN 978-0-415-91932-6.
- Halpern, Ben; Reinharz, Jehuda (1998-06-11). Zionism and the Creation of a New Society. Oxford University PressNew York, NY. doi:10.1093/oso/9780195092097.001.0001. ISBN 978-0-19-509209-7.
- Hen-Tov, Jacob (1974-01-01). Communism and Zionism in Palestine: The Commintern and the Political Unrest in the 1920s. Transaction Publishers. ISBN 978-1-4128-1997-8.
- Kornberg, Jacques (1993-11-22). Theodor Herzl: From Assimilation to Zionism. Indiana University Press. ISBN 978-0-253-11259-0.
- Mandel, Neville J. (1976). The Arabs and Zionism Before World War I. University of California Press. ISBN 978-0-520-02466-3.
- Penslar, Derek Jonathan (1991). Zionism and Technocracy: The Engineering of Jewish Settlement in Palestine, 1870-1918. Indiana University Press. ISBN 978-0-253-34290-4.
- Raider, Mark A. (September 1998). The Emergence of American Zionism. NYU Press. ISBN 978-0-8147-7499-1.
- Ravitzky, Aviezer (September 1996). Messianism, Zionism, and Jewish Religious Radicalism. University of Chicago Press. ISBN 978-0-226-70578-1.
- Šimʿônî, Gidʿôn (1997). The Zionist ideology. The Tauber Institute for the Study of European Jewry series (exclusive ed. of the Wold Zionist Organisation ed.). Hanover, NH: Brandeis Univ. Press. ISBN 978-0-87451-833-7.
- Sofer, Sasson (1998-05-21). Zionism and the Foundations of Israeli Diplomacy. Cambridge University Press. ISBN 978-0-521-63012-2.
- Urofsky, Melvin I. (1995-01-01). American Zionism from Herzl to the Holocaust. U of Nebraska Press. ISBN 978-0-8032-9559-9.
- Vital, David (1975). The Origins of Zionism. Clarendon Press. ISBN 978-0-19-827194-9.
- Zipperstein, Steven J. (1993). Elusive Prophet: Ahad Ha'am and the Origins of Zionism. University of California Press. ISBN 978-0-520-08111-6.

=== Anti-Zionism/Palestine solidarity ===
- Gould, Rebecca (18 July 2023). Erasing Palestine: Free Speech and Palestinian Freedom. Verso Books. ISBN 978-1-83976-904-7.
- Hill, Marc Lamont; Plitnick, Mitchell (16 February 2021). Except for Palestine: The Limits of Progressive Politics. The New Press. ISBN 978-1-62097-593-0.

=== Nakba ===
- Al-Hardan, Anaheed (5 April 2016). Palestinians in Syria: Nakba Memories of Shattered Communities. Columbia University Press. ISBN 978-0-231-54122-0.
- Auron, Yair (4 October 2017). The Holocaust, Rebirth, and the Nakba: Memory and Contemporary Israeli–Arab Relations. Lexington Books. ISBN 978-1-4985-5949-2.
- Ghalayini, Basma (2019). Palestine +100: Stories from a Century After the Nakba. Comma Press. ISBN 978-1-910974-44-5.
- Hasian Jr., Marouf (2020). Debates on Colonial Genocide in the 21st Century. Palgrave Macmillan. ISBN 978-3-030-21278-0.
- Lentin, Ronit (2010). Co-memory and melancholia: Israelis memorialising the Palestinian Nakba. Manchester University Press. ISBN 978-1-84779-768-1.
- Manna, Adel (2022). Nakba and Survival: The Story of Palestinians Who Remained in Haifa and the Galilee, 1948-1956. University of California Press. doi:10.1525/luminos.129. ISBN 978-0-520-38936-6. Archived from the original on 29 January 2024.
- Masalha, Nur (9 August 2012). The Palestine Nakba: Decolonising History, Narrating the Subaltern, Reclaiming Memory. Zed Books. ISBN 978-1-84813-973-2.
- Nashef, Hania A.M. (30 October 2018). Palestinian Culture and the Nakba: Bearing Witness. Taylor & Francis. ISBN 978-1-351-38749-1.
- Pappe, Ilan (2006). The Ethnic Cleansing of Palestine. Oneworld Publications. ISBN 978-1-78074-056-0.
- Sabbagh-Khoury, Areej (2023). Colonizing Palestine: The Zionist Left and the Making of the Palestinian Nakba. Stanford University Press. ISBN 978-1-5036-3629-3.
- Zureiq, Constantin (1956). The Meaning of the Disaster. Khayat's College Book Cooperative. (Original Arabic version: Zureiq, Constantin (1948). وصف الكتاب. دار العلم للملايين.)

=== International/comparative ===
- Greenstein, Ran (2022). Anti-Colonial Resistance in South Africa and Israel/Palestine: Identity, Nationalism, and Race. Taylor & Francis. ISBN 978-0-429-67075-6.
- Medzini, Meron (3 September 2024). Japan, the Jews, and Israel: Similarities and Contrasts. Walter de Gruyter GmbH & Co KG. ISBN 978-3-11-124007-7.
- Mir, Salam Darwazah (2024). Transnational Literature of Resistance: Guyana and Palestine, 1950s-1980s. Bloomsbury Academic. ISBN 979-8-7651-1177-2.
- Karsh, Efrayim, ed. (2004). Israel - the first one hundred years: Vol. IV: Israel in the international arena. Israeli history, politics and society. London: Cass. ISBN 978-0-7146-8021-7.
- Rabil, Robert G. (2003). Embattled Neighbors: Syria, Israel, and Lebanon. Lynne Rienner Publishers. ISBN 978-1-58826-149-6.
- Rubin, Aviad (December 2020). Bounded Integration: The Religion-State Relationship and Democratic Performance in Turkey and Israel. State University of New York Press. ISBN 978-1-4384-8078-7.
- Strieff, Daniel (2015-08-05). Jimmy Carter and the Middle East: The Politics of Presidential Diplomacy. Springer. ISBN 978-1-137-49947-9.
- Wildeman, Jeremy; Muhannad Ayyash, M. (November 2023). Canada as a Settler Colony on the Question of Palestine. University of Alberta. ISBN 978-1-77212-685-3.
- Windecker, Gidon (13 September 2023). Between Jabal ʿAmil, Karbala and Jerusalem: The Lebanese Shi'a and the Struggle for Palestine. Springer. ISBN 978-3-031-38450-9.

=== Foreign relations ===
- Aked, Hil (18 April 2023). Friends of Israel: The Backlash Against Palestine Solidarity. Verso Books. ISBN 978-1-78663-766-6.
- Beckerman, Carly (3 March 2020). Unexpected State: British Politics and the Creation of Israel. Indiana University Press. ISBN 978-0-253-04644-4.
- Blanga, Yehuda U. (21 November 2019). The US, Israel, and Egypt: Diplomacy in the Shadow of Attrition, 1969-70. Routledge. ISBN 978-0-429-84335-8.
- Bregman, Ahron (2005-09-29). Elusive Peace: How the Holy Land Defeated America. Penguin UK. ISBN 978-0-14-190613-3.
- Cavari, Amnon; Freedman, Guy (10 December 2020). American Public Opinion toward Israel: From Consensus to Divide. Routledge. ISBN 978-0-429-79580-0.
- Charny, Israel W. (27 April 2021). Israel's Failed Response to the Armenian Genocide: Denial, State Deception, Truth versus Politicization of History. Academic Studies Press. ISBN 978-1-64469-525-8.
- Christison, Kathleen (28 April 2023). Perceptions of Palestine: Their Influence on U.S. Middle East Policy. University of California Press. ISBN 978-0-520-92236-5.
- Cohen, Michael J. (15 July 2022). Truman and Israel. Univ of California Press. ISBN 978-0-520-37077-7.
- Frankel, Oz (23 July 2024). Coca-Cola, Black Panthers, and Phantom Jets: Israel in the American Orbit, 1967-1973. Stanford University Press. ISBN 978-1-5036-3953-9.
- Herf, Jeffrey (2022). Israel's Moment: International Support for and Opposition to Establishing the Jewish State, 1945–1949. Cambridge University Press. ISBN 978-1-316-51796-3.
- Huber, Daniela (2021). The International Dimension of the Israel-Palestinian Conflict: A Post-Eurocentric Approach. State University of New York Press. ISBN 978-1-4384-8158-6.
- Jensehaugen, Jørgen (7 June 2018). Arab-Israeli Diplomacy under Carter: The US, Israel and the Palestinians. Bloomsbury. ISBN 978-1-83860-800-2.
- Klieman, Aharon (12 June 2019). Statecraft in the Dark: Israel's Practice of Quiet Diplomacy. Routledge. ISBN 978-1-000-31311-6.
- Kolander, Kenneth (3 August 2020). America's Israel: The US Congress and American-Israeli Relations, 1967–1975. University Press of Kentucky. ISBN 978-0-8131-7949-0.
- Levin, Geoffrey (January 2023). Our Palestine Question: Israel and American Jewish Dissent, 1948-1978. Yale University Press. ISBN 978-0-300-26785-3.
- Marwecki, Daniel (2020). Germany and Israel: Whitewashing and Statebuilding. Oxford University Press. ISBN 978-1-78738-318-0.
- Mead, Walter Russell (3 October 2023). The Arc of a Covenant: The United States, Israel, and the Fate of the Jewish People. Knopf Doubleday Publishing. ISBN 978-0-375-71374-3.
- Mondal, Kamaran M. K. (10 January 2022). Canada's Foreign Policy and the Arab-Israel Conflict. Cambridge Scholars. ISBN 978-1-5275-7889-0.
- Navon, Emmanuel (November 2020). The Star and the Scepter: A Diplomatic History of Israel. U of Nebraska Press. ISBN 978-0-8276-1858-9.
- Peters, Joel; Pinfold, Rob Geist (28 February 2024). Routledge Handbook on Israel's Foreign Relations. Taylor & Francis. ISBN 978-1-003-83343-7.
- Prasad, Jayant; Rajiv, S. Samuel C. (29 June 2020). India and Israel: The Making of a Strategic Partnership. Routledge. ISBN 978-1-000-06668-5.
- Robins, Walker (17 March 2020). Between Dixie and Zion: Southern Baptists and Palestine before Israel. University of Alabama Press. ISBN 978-0-8173-2048-5.
- Thomson, Sorcha; Olsen, Pelle Valentin (23 February 2023). Palestine in the World: International Solidarity with the Palestinian Liberation Movement. Bloomsbury. ISBN 978-0-7556-4701-9.
- Tovy, Jacob (19 June 2023). Israel and the Question of Reparations from Germany: Post-Holocaust Reckonings (1949–1953). Walter de Gruyter GmbH & Co KG. ISBN 978-3-11-098253-4.
- Wertman, Ori; Kaunert, Christian (17 April 2023). Israel: National Security and Securitization: The Role of the United States in Defining What Counts. Springer. ISBN 978-3-031-25300-3.

=== Natural resources ===
- Braverman, Irus (2023). Settling Nature: The Conservation Regime in Palestine-Israel. U of Minnesota Press. ISBN 978-1-4529-6903-9.
- Brooks, David B.; Trottier, Julie; Giordano, Giulia (11 October 2019). Transboundary Water Issues in Israel, Palestine, and the Jordan River Basin: An Overview. Springer. ISBN 978-981-15-0252-1.
- Fergusson, James (2023). In Search of the River Jordan: A Story of Palestine, Israel and the Struggle for Water. Yale University Press. ISBN 978-0-300-24415-1.
- Gutkowski, Natalia (14 May 2024). Struggling for Time: Environmental Governance and Agrarian Resistance in Israel/Palestine. Stanford University Press. ISBN 978-1-5036-3773-3.
- Selby, Jan (2003). Water, Power and Politics in the Middle East: The Other Israeli–Palestinian Conflict. I.B.Tauris. ISBN 1-86064-934-3
- Ward, Christopher Stuart; Ruckstuhl, Sandra; Learmont, Isabelle (2021). The History of Water in the Land Once Called Palestine: Scarcity, Conflict and Loss in Middle East Water Resources. I.B. Tauris. ISBN 978-0-7556-1807-1.

=== Geography ===
- Bashir, Bashir; Farsakh, Leila (2020). The Arab and Jewish Questions: Geographies of Engagement in Palestine and Beyond. Columbia University Press. ISBN 978-0-231-55299-8.
- Ben-Arieh, Yehoshua (9 March 2020). The Making of Eretz Israel in the Modern Era: A Historical-Geographical Study (1799–1949). Walter de Gruyter GmbH & Co KG. ISBN 978-3-11-062654-4.
- Davis, Rochelle (2011). Palestinian Village Histories: Geographies of the Displaced. Stanford University Press. ISBN 978-0-8047-7313-3.

=== Immigration/emigration ===
- Al Haj, Majid (10 January 2019). The Russians in Israel: A New Ethnic Group in a Tribal Society. Routledge. ISBN 978-1-351-02568-3.
- Hochman, Oshrat (30 June 2023). Immigration and Integration in Israel and Beyond. transcript Verlag. ISBN 978-3-8394-6675-9.
- Nir, Yaacov (19 October 2021). Immigration to Palestine during the British Mandate (1922-1948). Cambridge Scholars. ISBN 978-1-5275-7647-6.
- Yehudai, Ori (2020). Leaving Zion: Jewish Emigration from Palestine and Israel after World War II. Cambridge University Press. ISBN 978-1-108-47834-2.

=== Legal ===
- Boyle, Francis A. (2009). Palestine, Palestinians and International Law. Clarity Press. ISBN 978-0-932863-92-8.
- Cohen, Yitshak (15 June 2021). The Unique Family Law in the State of Israel. Academic Studies Press. ISBN 978-1-64469-542-5.
- Imseis, Ardi (30 November 2023). The United Nations and the Question of Palestine: Rule by Law and the Structure of International Legal Subalternity. Cambridge University Press. ISBN 978-1-316-51389-7.
- Kaye, Alexander (22 January 2020). The Invention of Jewish Theocracy: The Struggle for Legal Authority in Modern Israel. Oxford University Press. ISBN 978-0-19-092275-7.
- Kedar, Nir, ed. (2019). Law and Identity in Israel: A Century of Debate. Cambridge Studies in Law and Judaism. Cambridge University Press. doi:10.1017/9781108670227.010. ISBN 978-1-108-48435-0.
- Kiswanson, Nada; Power, Susan, eds. (2023). Prolonged Occupation and International Law: Israel and Palestine. Martinus Nijhoff Publishers. ISBN 978-90-04-50393-9.
- O'Brien, William Vincent (1991). Law and Morality in Israel's War with the PLO. Routledge. ISBN 978-0-415-90300-4.
- Rosen-Zvi, Issachar (2017). Taking Space Seriously: Law, Space and Society in Contemporary Israel. Routledge. ISBN 978-1-351-89641-2.
- Tevet, Eyal; Shiffer, Varda; Galnoor, Itzhak (14 December 2020). Regulation in Israel: Values, Effectiveness, Methods. Springer. ISBN 978-3-030-56247-2.
- Viterbo, Hedi (2021). Problematizing Law, Rights, and Childhood in Israel/Palestine. Cambridge University Press. ISBN 978-1-009-02741-0.

=== Security ===
- Bresheeth-Zabner, Haim (25 August 2020). An Army Like No Other: How the Israel Defense Forces Made a Nation. Verso Books. ISBN 978-1-78873-786-9.
- Clements, Frank (2017-07-05). Israeli Secret Services. Routledge. ISBN 978-1-351-51133-9.
- Frantzman, Seth J. (2024-07-23). The October 7 War: Israel's Battle for Security in Gaza. Wicked Son. ISBN 979-8-88845-638-5.
- Freilich, Charles D.; Cohen, Matthew S.; Siboni, Gabi (23 June 2023). Israel and the Cyber Threat: How the Startup Nation Became a Global Cyber Power. Oxford University Press. ISBN 978-0-19-767772-8.
- Ganor, Boaz (20 July 2021). Israel's Counterterrorism Strategy: Origins to the Present. Columbia University Press. ISBN 978-0-231-55300-1.
- Ganor, Boaz; Koblentz-Stenzler, Liram (2022). Israel's Targeted Killing Policy: Moral, Ethical & Operational Dilemmas. Springer Nature. ISBN 978-3-031-13674-0.
- Horovitz, David (2007-12-18). Still Life with Bombers: Israel in the Age of Terrorism. Knopf Doubleday Publishing Group. ISBN 978-0-307-42796-0.
- Olesker, Ronnie (5 August 2021). Israel's Securitization Dilemma: BDS and the Battle for the Legitimacy of the Jewish State. Routledge. ISBN 978-1-000-42387-7.
- Pressman, Jeremy (2020). The sword is not enough: Arabs, Israelis, and the limits of military force. Manchester: Manchester University Press. ISBN 978-1-5261-4617-5.
- Rodman, David (29 September 2023). Israel's National Security Predicament: Guarding the Third Temple. Taylor & Francis. ISBN 978-1-000-93452-6.
- Shavit, Shabtai (30 September 2020). Head of the Mossad: In Pursuit of a Safe and Secure Israel. University of Notre Dame Press. ISBN 978-0-268-10835-9.

=== Theology/religion ===
- Friedman, Shuki (2023). Being a Nation State in the Twenty-First Century: Between State and Synagogue in Modern Israel. Academic Studies Press. ISBN 979-8-88719-091-4.
- Gutkowski, Stacey (27 October 2020). Religion, war and Israel's secular millennials: Being reasonable?. Manchester University Press. ISBN 978-1-5261-2999-4.
- Liebman, Charles S.; Don-Yehiya, Eliezer (13 May 2022). Civil Religion in Israel: Traditional Judaism and Political Culture in the Jewish State. Univ of California Press. ISBN 978-0-520-35957-4.
- Modongal, Shameer (2022). Islamic Perspectives on International Conflict Resolution: Theological Debates and the Israel-Palestinian Peace Process. Routledge. ISBN 978-1-000-81010-3.
- Rabinovich, Silvana (2022). Biblical Figures in Israel's Colonial Political Theology. Springer Nature. ISBN 978-3-031-03822-8.
- Rosmer, Tilde (2022). The Islamic Movement in Israel. University of Texas Press. ISBN 978-1-4773-2356-4.
- Troen, S. Ilan (2024). Israel/Palestine in World Religions: Whose Promised Land?. Springer Nature. ISBN 978-3-031-50914-8.
- Winter, Ofir (2022). Peace in the Name of Allah: Islamic Discourses on Treaties with Israel. Walter de Gruyter GmbH & Co KG. ISBN 978-3-11-073055-5.

=== Psychology ===
- Falk, Avner (2004-12-08). Fratricide in the Holy Land: A Psychoanalytic View of the Arab-Israeli Conflict. University of Wisconsin Press. ISBN 978-0-299-20250-7.
- Mandatory Madness: Colonial Psychiatry and Mental Illness in British Mandate Palestine. Cambridge University Press. 30 November 2023. ISBN 978-1-009-43037-1.
- Salinas, Moises F. (2007-05-30). Planting Hatred, Sowing Pain: The Psychology of the Israeli-Palestinian Conflict. Bloomsbury Academic. ISBN 978-0-275-99005-3.

=== Culture ===
- Hamdi, Tahrir (17 November 2022). Imagining Palestine: Cultures of Exile and National Identity. Bloomsbury. ISBN 978-0-7556-1783-8.
- Helman, Anat (2011). A Coat of Many Colors: Dress Culture in the Young State of Israel. Academic Studies Press. ISBN 978-1-934843-88-8.
- Karayanni, Michael (17 December 2020). A Multicultural Entrapment: Religion and State Among the Palestinian-Arabs in Israel. Cambridge University Press. ISBN 978-1-108-48546-3.
- Makdisi, Saree (20 August 2024). Tolerance is a Wasteland: Palestine and the Culture of Denial. Univ of California Press. ISBN 978-0-520-40969-9.
- Pasternak, Gil (2022). Visioning Israel-Palestine: Encounters at the Cultural Boundaries of Conflict. Bloomsbury Academic. ISBN 978-1-350-28074-8.
- Ram, Haggai (27 October 2020). Intoxicating Zion: A Social History of Hashish in Mandatory Palestine and Israel. Stanford University Press. ISBN 978-1-5036-1392-8.
- Rojanski, Rachel (7 January 2020). Yiddish in Israel: A History. Indiana University Press. ISBN 978-0-253-04518-8.
- Shalom, Aviad Sar (2023). Cultural Landscapes of Israel. Springer. ISBN 978-3-031-33685-0.
- Sicher, Efraim (2021). Re-envisioning Jewish Identities: Reflections on Contemporary Culture in Israel and the Diaspora. Brill Publishers. ISBN 978-90-04-46225-0.
- Sorek, Tamir (2021). Culture and Conflict in Palestine/Israel. Routledge. ISBN 978-1-000-53304-0.

=== Race ===
- Abu-Laban, Yasmeen (2019). Israel, Palestine and the Politics of Race: Exploring Identity and Power in a Global Context. Bloomsbury Publishing. ISBN 978-1-83860-879-8.
- Dorchin, Uri; Djerrahian, Gabriella, eds. (2020). Blackness in Israel: Rethinking Racial Boundaries. Routledge. ISBN 978-1-000-25826-4.
- Elia-Shalev, Asaf (2024). Israel's Black Panthers: The Radicals Who Punctured a Nation's Founding Myth. University of California Press. ISBN 978-0-520-96749-6.
- Hasso, Frances S. (2 December 2021). Buried in the Red Dirt: Race, Reproduction, and Death in Modern Palestine. Cambridge University Press. ISBN 978-1-009-07553-4.
- Lewis, Bernard (1999-05-17). Semites and Anti-Semites: An Inquiry into Conflict and Prejudice. W. W. Norton & Company. ISBN 978-0-393-24556-1.
- Spangler, Eve (2019-05-15). Understanding Israel/Palestine: Race, Nation, and Human Rights in the Conflict (Second ed.). Brill. ISBN 978-90-04-39414-8.

=== Media studies ===
- Hirschberger, Bernd (2021). External Communication in Social Media During Asymmetric Conflicts: A Theoretical Model and Empirical Case Study of the Conflict in Israel and Palestine. transcript Verlag. ISBN 978-3-8394-5509-8.
- Lim, Andrew (2022). Political Marketing and Public Diplomacy by Pro-Israel and Pro-Palestinian Advocacy Groups. Springer Nature. ISBN 978-3-031-15332-7.
- Mann, Daniel (2022). Occupying Habits: Everyday Media as Warfare in Israel-Palestine. Bloomsbury Publishing. ISBN 978-0-7556-3392-0.

=== The arts ===
- Bahar, Shirly (2021). Documentary Cinema in Israel-Palestine: Performance, the Body, the Home. Bloomsbury Publishing. ISBN 978-1-83860-680-0.
- Belkind, Nili (2020). Music in Conflict: Palestine, Israel and the Politics of Aesthetic Production. Routledge. ISBN 978-1-000-20400-1.
- Berdugo, Liat (2021). The Weaponized Camera in the Middle East: Videography, Aesthetics, and Politics in Israel and Palestine. Bloomsbury Publishing. ISBN 978-1-83860-274-1.
- Curthoys, Ned; Hesse, Isabelle (31 May 2024). Literary Representations of the Palestine/Israel Conflict After the Second Intifada. ISBN 978-1-4744-9974-3.
- Giansante, Rocco; Goldberg, Luna (27 February 2023). Imagined Israel(s): Representations of the Jewish State in the Arts. Brill. ISBN 978-90-04-53072-0.
- Hochberg, Gil Z. (20 September 2021). Becoming Palestine: Toward an Archival Imagination of the Future. Duke University Press. ISBN 978-1-4780-2213-8.
- Makhoul, Manar H. (2020). Palestinian Citizens in Israel: A History Through Fiction, 1948-2010. Edinburgh University Press. ISBN 978-1-4744-5929-7.
- Nassar, Issam; Sheehi, Stephen; Tamari, Salim (9 August 2022). Camera Palaestina: Photography and Displaced Histories of Palestine. Univ of California Press. ISBN 978-0-520-38289-3.
- Paul, Drew (2020). Israel/Palestine: Border Representations in Literature and Film. Edinburgh University Press. ISBN 978-1-4744-5615-9.
- Qabaha, Ahmad; Gregory Fox, Rachel, eds. (February 2021). Post-Millennial Palestine: Literature, Memory, Resistance. Liverpool University Press. ISBN 978-1-80034-744-1.
- Shaw, Tony; Goodman, Giora (2022). Hollywood and Israel: A History. Columbia University Press. ISBN 978-0-231-54492-4.
- Stein, Rebecca L. (2021). Screen Shots: State Violence on Camera in Israel and Palestine. Stanford University Press. ISBN 978-1-5036-2803-8.
- Summerer, Karène Sanchez; Zananiri, Sary (5 July 2021). Imaging and Imagining Palestine: Photography, Modernity and the Biblical Lens, 1918–1948. BRILL. ISBN 978-90-04-43794-4.
- Wallis, Rodney (2020). Reimagining the Promised Land: Israel and America in Post-war Hollywood Cinema. Bloomsbury Academic. ISBN 978-1-5013-5085-6.
- White, Robert G. (29 June 2023). An Atonal Cinema: Resistance, Counterpoint and Dialogue in Transnational Palestine. Bloomsbury Publishing USA. ISBN 978-1-5013-8499-8.

=== Gender studies ===
- Chazan, Meir (September 2022). Jewish Women and the Defense of Palestine: The Modest Revolution, 1907–1945. State University of New York Press. ISBN 978-1-4384-9015-1.
- Elia, Nada (2023). Greater Than the Sum of Our Parts: Feminism, Inter/Nationalism, and Palestine. Pluto Press. ISBN 978-0-7453-4747-9.
- Hasso, Frances S. (22 December 2020). Resistance, Repression, and Gender Politics in Occupied Palestine and Jordan. Syracuse University Press. ISBN 978-1-68445-023-7.
- Tucker, Judith E. (28 April 2023). In the House of the Law: Gender and Islamic Law in Ottoman Syria and Palestine. University of California Press. ISBN 978-0-520-92538-0.
- Zinngrebe, Kim Jezabel (12 July 2022). Defying "The Plan": Intimate Politics Among Palestinian Women in Israel. Indiana University Press. ISBN 978-0-253-06251-2.

=== LGBTQ+ ===
- Alqaisiya, Walaa (7 November 2022). Decolonial Queering in Palestine. Taylor & Francis. ISBN 978-1-000-63879-0.
- Atshan, Sa'ed (26 May 2020). Queer Palestine and the Empire of Critique. Stanford University Press. ISBN 978-1-5036-1240-2.

=== Communism/socialism ===
- Awad, Sumaya; Bean, Brian (December 2020). Palestine: A Socialist Introduction. Haymarket Books. ISBN 978-1-64259-531-4.
- Nir, Oded; Wainwright, Joel, eds. (2020). Rethinking Israel and Palestine: Marxist Perspectives. Routledge. ISBN 978-1-000-51745-3.

=== In academia ===
- Barari, Hassan A. (2012). Israelism: Arab Scholarship on Israel, a Critical Assessment. Ithaca Press. ISBN 978-0-86372-416-9.
- Borhani, Seyed Hadi (2022). Textbooks on Israel-Palestine: The Politics of Education and Knowledge in the West. Bloomsbury Publishing. ISBN 978-1-350-23309-6.
- Finkelstein, Norman G. (2005-08-28). Beyond Chutzpah: On the Misuse of Anti-Semitism and the Abuse of History. University of California Press. ISBN 978-0-520-24598-3.
- Furas, Yoni (2020). Educating Palestine: Teaching and Learning History Under the Mandate. Oxford University Press. ISBN 978-0-19-885642-9.
- Harris, Rachel S. (2019-04-22). Teaching the Arab-Israeli Conflict. Wayne State University Press. ISBN 978-0-8143-4678-5.
- Karsh, Efrayim (2002). Fabricating Israeli history: the "new historians". Cass studies in Israeli history, politics, and society (2., rev. ed., reprinted ed.). London: Cass. ISBN 978-0-7146-8063-7.
- Knopf-Newman, Marcy Jane (2011-11-21). The Politics of Teaching Palestine to Americans: Addressing Pedagogical Strategies. Springer. ISBN 978-1-137-00220-4.
- Landy, David (2020). Enforcing Silence: Academic Freedom, Palestine and the Criticism of Israel. Bloomsbury Publishing. ISBN 978-1-78699-652-7.
- Masalha, Nur (24 February 2022). Palestine Across Millennia: A History of Literacy, Learning and Educational Revolutions. Bloomsbury. ISBN 978-0-7556-4296-0.
- Stern, Kenneth S. (2020). Conflict over the Conflict: The Israel/Palestine Campus Debate. University of Toronto Press. ISBN 978-1-4875-0736-7.
- Weinreb, Amelia Rosenberg (2022). Teaching Israel Studies: Global, Virtual, and Ethnographic Approaches to Active Learning. Springer Nature. ISBN 978-3-031-16915-1.

== Non-English ==
- Cejka, Marek. Israel and Palestine: The Past, Present and Direction of the Middle Eastern Conflict (Barrister and Principal, 2005), ISBN 978-80-87029-16-9
- Laurens, Henry
  - La Question de Palestine I, L'invention de la Terre sainte. 1799–1922, 1999
  - La Question de Palestine II, Une mission sacrée de civilisation, 1922–1947, 2002
  - La Question de Palestine III, L'Accomplissement des prophéties 1947–1967, 2007
  - La question de Palestine IV, Le rameau d'olivier et le fusil du combatant, (1967–1982), Fayard, Paris 2011.
  - La question de Palestine V, La paix impossible, 1982–2001, Fayard, Paris 2015.
- Mardellat, Victor, "La Tragédie israélo-palestinienne. Une lecture du conflit israélo-palestinien à travers la tragédie antique". Suresnes: Les éditions du net, 2014.
- Vescovi, Thomas (15 January 2015). La mémoire de la Nakba en Israël: Le regard de la société israélienne sur la tragédie palestinienne. Editions L'Harmattan. ISBN 978-2-336-36805-4.

== External bibliographies of the Arab–Israeli conflict ==
=== Academic ===
- Dowty, Alan. "The Arab–Israel Conflict". Oxford Bibliographies.
- Kiener, Ron. "Select bibliography of the Arab-Israeli conflict in English" – via Trinity College.
- O'Donnell, Patrick S. (2015). "The Israeli–Palestinian Conflict: A Select Bibliography". Department of Philosophy Santa Barbara City College.
- Tinnes, Judith (2014). "Bibliography: Israeli-Palestinian Conflict (Part 1)". Perspectives on Terrorism. 8 (5): 84–116. ISSN 2334-3745. JSTOR 26297282.
- Tinnes, Judith (2018). "Bibliography: Israeli-Palestinian Conflict (Part 2)". Perspectives on Terrorism. 12 (1): 152–185. ISSN 2334-3745. JSTOR 26343769.
- "Zionism from Its Inception to 1948". obo.
