= Jonathan Cook =

British journalist

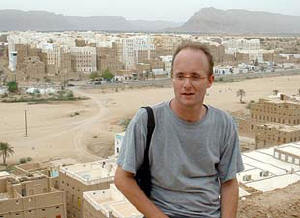
- Born: Buckinghamshire, England
- Other name: Jonathan K. Cook
- Citizenship: British; Israeli
- Education: University of Southampton; Cardiff University; School of Oriental and African Studies
- Occupations: Journalist; Writer; Author
- Years active: 1996–present
- Employer: The Guardian (1996–2001)
- Website: www.jonathan-cook.net

Jonathan Cook, born circa 1965, is a British writer and a freelance journalist formerly based in Nazareth, Israel, who writes about the Israeli–Palestinian conflict. He writes a regular column for The National of Abu Dhabi and Middle East Eye.

== Background ==
Cook was born and raised in Buckinghamshire, England, UK. He received a B.A. (Hons) in Philosophy and Politics from Southampton University in 1987, a postgraduate diploma in journalism from Cardiff University in 1989, and an M.A. in Middle Eastern studies from the School of Oriental and African Studies in 2000. Jonathan has Israeli citizenship through marriage to his Israeli Arab wife, Sally Azzam. The couple met in Nazareth where they lived with their two daughters for several years before moving to the UK.

== Career ==
=== Journalism ===
Cook was a freelance sub-editor with several national newspapers from 1994 until 1996. He was a staff journalist at The Guardian and The Observer between 1996 and 2001.

Since September 2001, Cook has been a freelance writer based in Nazareth, Israel. Until 2007, he wrote columns for The Guardian.

In 2011, Cook received the Martha Gellhorn special award for journalism, "for his work on the Middle East". The award citation said Cook's work on Palestine and Israel made him "one of the reliable truth-tellers in the Middle East".

In 2013, Cook questioned that the Ghouta chemical attack was perpetrated by the Syrian government, presenting a "counter-narrative" that the Syrian rebels may have committed the attack. In 2018, after the Douma chemical attack, Cook said that the testimonies of 17 Russian-produced witnesses at the Organisation for the Prohibition of Chemical Weapons confirmed a report by Robert Fisk that said victims' breathing problem was due to dust and lack of oxygen rather than gas.

=== Books ===
Cook has written three books. In Blood and Religion (2006), published by Pluto Press, the central thesis is that, "Israel is beginning a long, slow process of ethnic cleansing both of Palestinian non-citizens from parts of the occupied territories that it has long coveted for its expanded Jewish state, and of Palestinian citizens from inside its internationally recognized borders." Cook links this strategy to the Israeli perception of two threats: the physical threat of terrorism and the demographic threat of a Palestinian majority potentialised by high Palestinian birth rates and the continued demand for a Palestinian right of return. The Israeli leadership is also said by Cook to view the idea of a "state for all its citizens" as a threat. Rami George Khouri describes the short book as, "important but disturbing".

In 2008, Cook published Israel and the Clash of Civilizations: Iraq, Iran and the plan to remake the Middle East, published by Pluto Press. Of the book, Antony Loewenstein wrote that, "Cook bravely skewers the mainstream narrative of a Jewish state constantly striving for peace with the Palestinians." According to Lowenstein, Cook argues that Israel "pursues policies that lead to civil war and partition," and that this idea of dissolving many of the nations of the Middle East, shared by the neocons and the Bush administration, was developed by Israel's security establishment in the 1980s. Cook discusses an essay authored by Oded Yinon and published by the World Zionist Organization in 1982 which advocated for Israel's transformation into a regional imperial power via the fragmentation of the Arab world, "into a mosaic of ethnic and confessional groupings that could be more easily manipulated" (p. 107). A review of the book in The Jordan Times called it "well-researched and very readable."

Disappearing Palestine: Israel's Experiments in Human Despair was published in 2008 by Zed Books. Helena Cobban in the Boston Review says Cook argues that to encourage voluntary emigration, Israel has made life unbearable for Palestinians, primarily via "the ever more sophisticated systems of curfews, checkpoints, walls, permits and land grabs."

== Selected works ==
=== Books ===
- (2006) Blood and Religion: The Unmasking of the Jewish and Democratic State. Pluto Press. ISBN 0-7453-2555-6
- (2008) Israel and the Clash of Civilizations: Iraq, Iran and the plan to remake the Middle East. Pluto Press. ISBN 978-0-7453-2754-9
- (2008) Disappearing Palestine: Israel's Experiments in Human Despair. Zed Books. ISBN 978-1-84813-031-9

==== Chapters in books ====
- (2005) "Unrecognized Villages: Indigenous 'Ayn Hawd versus Artists' Colony 'Ein Hod," in Nur Masalha, Catastrophe Remembered: Palestine, Israel, and the Internal Refugees, Zed Books, ISBN 1-84277-623-1
- (2006) "Israel's Glass Wall: The Or Commission," in Joel Beinin and Rebecca L. Stein. The struggle for sovereignty: Palestine and Israel, 1993–2005. Stanford University Press. ISBN 0-8047-5365-2
- (2008). Foreword in Hatim Kanaaneh, A Doctor in Galilee: The Life and Struggle of a Palestinian in Israel. Pluto Press. ISBN 0-7453-2786-9
