= Michael Stanislawski =

American historian (born 1952)

Michael F. Stanislawski (born 1952) is the Nathan J. Miller Professor of Jewish History at Columbia University.

He obtained his B.A. (1973), M.A. (1975) Ph.D. (1979) from Harvard University, and has been at Columbia since 1980. His dissertation, Tsar Nicholas I and the Jews: The Transformation of Jewish Society in Russia, 1825-1855, was published in 1983.

Other notable books by Stanislawski include Zionism and the Fin de Siècle: Cosmopolitanism and Nationalism from Nordau to Jabotinsky (2001), For Whom Do I Toil?: Judah Leib Gordon and the Crisis of Russian Jewry (1988), Autobiographical Jews (2004).

His most recent book, A Murder in Lemberg (2007), chronicles the murder of a reformist rabbi by an Orthodox Jew in the Ukrainian city of Lemberg (now Lviv).

Stanislawski is credited as being a key intellectual in the transformation of Jewish historiography that has "embedded the narrative about the Jews in the context of Enlightenment thought, national politics, and the treatment of minorities generally."

== Awards ==
1984: National Jewish Book Award in Jewish History for Tsar Nicholas I and the Jews: The Transformation of Jewish Society in Russia, 1825-1855
