= Efraim Karsh =

Israeli–British historian (born 1953)

- אפרים קארש
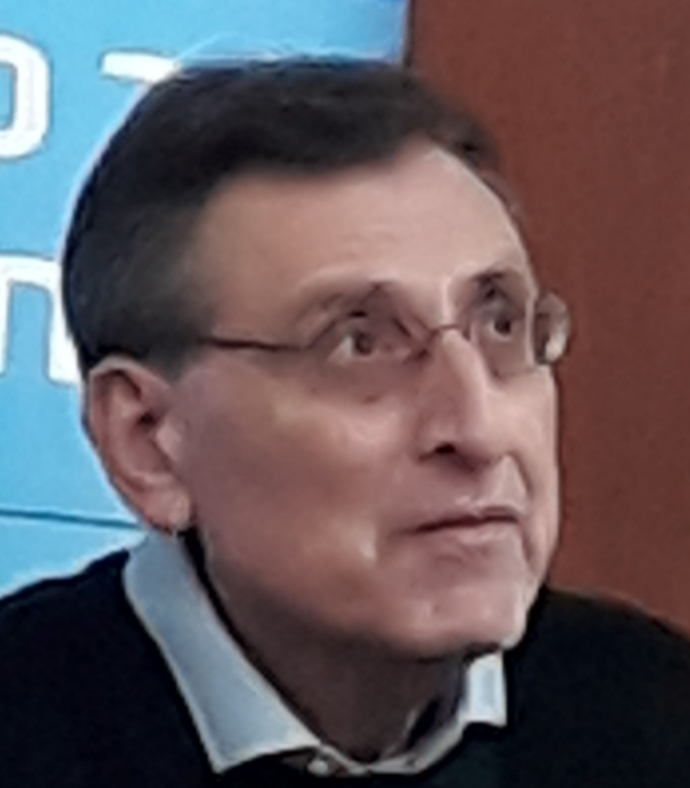
- Karsh in 2019
- Born: 6 September 1953 (age 73)

Academic background
- Education: Hebrew University of Jerusalem (BA); Tel Aviv University (MA, PhD)

Academic work
- Discipline: Historian
- Institutions: King's College London

Efraim Karsh (Hebrew: אפרים קארש; born 6 September 1953) is an Israeli and British historian who is the founding director and emeritus professor of Middle East and Mediterranean Studies at King's College London. Since 2013, he has served as professor of political studies at Bar-Ilan University (where he also directs the Begin-Sadat Center for Strategic Studies). He is also a principal research fellow and former director of the Middle East Forum, a Philadelphia-based think tank. He is a vocal critic of the New Historians, a group of Israeli scholars who have questioned the traditional Israeli narrative of the Arab–Israeli conflict.

== Early life and education ==
Born and raised in Israel to Jewish immigrants to the Palestine Mandate, Karsh graduated in Arabic and Modern Middle East History from the Hebrew University in Jerusalem, and obtained an MA and PhD in International Relations from Tel Aviv University. After acquiring his first academic degree in modern Middle Eastern history, he was a research analyst for the Israel Defense Forces (IDF), where he attained the rank of major.

== Academic and media career ==
Karsh has held various academic posts at Harvard and Columbia universities, the Sorbonne, the London School of Economics, Helsinki University, the International Institute for Strategic Studies in London, the Kennan Institute for Advanced Russian Studies in Washington D.C., and the Jaffee Center for Strategic Studies at Tel Aviv University. In 1989 he joined King's College London, where he established the Middle East and Mediterranean Studies Program, directing it for 16 years. He has published extensively on Middle Eastern affairs, Soviet foreign policy, and European neutrality, and is a founding editor of the scholarly journal Israel Affairs, and editor of the Middle East Quarterly. He is a regular media commentator, has appeared on all the main radio and television networks in the United Kingdom and the United States, and has contributed articles to leading newspapers, including The New York Times, The Los Angeles Times,The Wall Street Journal, The Times (London) and The Daily Telegraph.

== Views ==
In his 2010 book Palestine Betrayed, followed by a 2011 editorial in Haaretz, Karsh articulated his belief that the 1948 Palestinian expulsion and flight was "exclusively of their own making". Karsh writes that many Palestinians fled their homes as the result of pressure from local Arab leaders "and/or the Arab Liberation Army that had entered Palestine prior to the end of the Mandate (Mandatory Palestine), whether out of military considerations or in order to prevent them from becoming citizens of the prospective Jewish state." He stated that there is an "overwhelming and incontrovertible body of evidence" to support his position including "intelligence briefs, captured Arab documents, press reports, personal testimonies and memoirs..." Karsh states that "the deliberate depopulation of Arab villages and their transformation into military strongholds" began in December 1947.

Karsh rejects the Palestinian demands for a right of the return, citing a need for Israel to maintain its Jewish character. "However, even if the more restrictive Israeli figures were to be accepted, it is certainly true, just as Amos Oz darkly predicts, that the influx of these refugees into the Jewish State would irrevocably transform its demographic composition. At the moment, Jews constitute about 79 percent of Israel's six-million-plus population, a figure that would rapidly dwindle to under 60 percent. Given the Palestinians' far higher birth rate, the implementation of a 'right of return', even by the most conservative estimates, would be tantamount to Israel's transformation into an 'ordinary' Arab state."

== Selected book summaries ==
=== Empires of the Sand ===
Karsh's Empires of the Sand: The Struggle for Mastery in the Middle East, 1789–1922 was published in 1999, co-written by his wife Inari Rautsi-Karsh.

Daniel Pipes called it a "tour de force that offers a profoundly new understanding of a key issue in modern Middle Eastern history:" and said that " Drawing on a wide range of original sources, and writing in a clearly organized fashion and in fast-paced prose, the Karshes make a very compelling case for their revisionist position, establishing it point by point and in elegant detail".

Anthony B. Toth wrote in a review: "This is a polemical book whose authors have extended the intemperate and unbalanced rhetoric customarily employed by dogmatic partisans of the Arab Israeli conflict to the normally sedate and measured arena of nineteenth - and early twentieth-century Ottoman history. The book relies mainly on Western published sources and official documents of the British government. But their use of even these sources is limited, since they actually ignore most of nineteenth-century history. Instead, the authors emphasize those episodes they feel support their interpretations".

Richard Bulliet, professor of history at the Middle East Institute of Columbia University wrote that Empires of the Sand is "a tendentious and unreliable piece of scholarship that should have been vetted more thoroughly by the publisher" and asserts that the authors failed to "contribute a dimension of sense and scholarship that raises the debate[s in question] to a higher level." Karsh in response wondered "what credential did Bulliet possess, that a leading journal in the field should ask him to review our book? He is a medievalist who has done no research or writing on the subject. But in his spare time, he propagates the view of the Middle East and its nations as hapless victims of Western imperialism. In Middle Eastern studies that in itself is a sufficient credential to pronounce on anything. In his review, Bulliet rushes to absolve the Ottomans of responsibility for crimes they committed in their effort to keep their own empire intact. The evidence be damned - for it would not so well have served Bulliet's interest.".

Charles D. Smith, professor emeritus of Middle East history, states that the book is "essentially a work of propaganda, but still of use to students who wished to see how scholars could misrepresent sources". In his 2010 review of the book, Smith says that "In order to sustain their arguments, the Karshes, as judged by their citations, ignore nearly all scholarship of the past thirty years or more on British policy generally or as it pertained to the Middle East during World War I.".

Karsh states that his book "has incurred the ire of the Arabist establishment" and that "scathing indictments have been made, on the basis of hearsay, without writers taking the trouble to read the book. A leading academic has even urged fellow academics to place negative reviews on the website of a major Internet bookstore, so as to warn potential readers of our book." Karsh further said "[the]conventional view – absolving Middle Easterners and blaming the West – is academically unsound and morally reprehensible. It is academically unsound because the facts tell an altogether different story of modern Middle Eastern history, one that has consistently been suppressed because of its incongruity with the politically correct dogmas of the Arabist establishment. And it is morally reprehensible because denying the responsibility of individuals and societies for their actions is patronizing and in the worst tradition of the 'white man's burden' approach, which has dismissed regional players as half-witted creatures, too dim to be accountable for their own fate... Little wonder therefore that Empires of the Sand was more favorably received by Middle Eastern intellectuals, fed up with being talked down to and open to real revisionism of their region's history after suffering decades of condescension from their paternalistic champions in the West."

=== Islamic Imperialism ===
In 2006 Karsh published Islamic Imperialism: A History, stating that Islam started out as a Great Jihad that lasted over a thousand years, and persisted in the Ottoman Empire right up through World War I, and is still alive today with the jihad against Israel, the 9/11 Attack, al-Qaeda, ISIS, etc.

In a review, professor of history Richard Bulliet stated:

Pursuing the myriad problems called up by the evidence Karsh presents to support his case would be pointless. The book is selling ideology, not historical acumen. [...] As a history of Islam, Islamic Imperialism is a travesty, but as ideological preaching, it should please the choir to which it is directed.

In a review, professor of history Robert Tignor stated:

The book is timely as well as polemical. Its polemics and its obvious intention to arouse strong responses should not deter readers, since it is a work deserving to be read for its penetrating analyses of the long history of Islam as an expanding and proselytizing faith.

Writing in International Review of Modern Sociology, California State University professor Henry E. Chambers concluded his review with the words: "This politically driven history will lead readers astray and offers a flawed version of the Middle East." In the review, professor of history Marian Gross writes:

The ingenuity of Karsh’s monograph is that it portrays Islamic imperialism in the same light as all other imperialism—accentuating the utter normalcy of Muslim rulers’ imperialist ventures, goals, and means.[...] By seeking the roots of the current situations in the Middle East within the framework of Middle Eastern history, Karsh provides an invaluable assessment.

Reviewing the German translation of the book in Die Welt Des Islams, Erlangen University professor of history Thomas Philipp wrote:

Imperialismus im Namen Allahs is the book of a knowledgeable historian who follows the fashionable trend of wholesale denigration of Islam and the Arabs, and whose political interests clearly dominate his terminology and historical analysis.

Jonathan Berkey writes in his review, that the core argument of the book is "controversial, and many readers will find it unconvincing". He finds Karsh's "discussion of premodern Islam misconstrues its history in some important ways". As for the use of "Islamic Imperialism", Berkey says that "At best, there is a tendency here to fall back on broad and unsupportable generalizations about Islam and Muslims that recent historians have rightly shunned".

Reviewing the book, history professor William E. Watson from Immaculata University writes that "book destined to become a seminal study on the history of radical Islam"

=== Palestine Betrayed ===
Karsh's 2010 book Palestine Betrayed is about the breakdown of relations between the Jewish and Arab communities between 1920 and 1948.

According to Karsh:

"Far from being the hapless victims of a predatory Zionist assault, it was Palestinian Arab leaders who, from the early 1920s onward, and very much against the wishes of their own constituents, launched a relentless campaign to obliterate the Jewish national revival which culminated in the violent attempt to abort the U.N. partition resolution... There was nothing inevitable about the Palestinian–Jewish confrontation, let alone the Arab–Israeli conflict."

In a review published by The Middle East Journal, Charles D. Smith was highly critical of Palestine Betrayed. Smith says that throughout the book, Karsh presents the Zionists as "sincere and open with Palestinians, as are the British", whereas "Palestinians and other Arabs, especially their leaders" are presented as "corrupt and untrustworthy". Karsh, according to Smith, deliberately distorts the main thrust of the Peel Commission Report and is "incapable of accepting the idea of Palestinian national aspirations".

Israeli historian Benny Morris describes Karsh's portrayal of the British government as betraying the Jews in Palestine and ultimately reneging on their commitment to support Jewish statehood as "one-sided and without nuance".

Hillel Cohen wrote a highly critical review of the work in The American Historical Review, describing "evasions of basic facts", and stating that "a book that discusses the 1948 Arab refugees yet fails to mention, for example, the psychological warfare waged by the Jewish forces, the transfer idea in Zionist thought, or the aerial bombardment of Palestinian towns—all topics on which abundance of information can be found in the very archives that were examined for this study—cannot be considered an authoritative book on 1948."

Daniel Pipes of the Middle East Forum, wrote favourably of the book in a review published by The National Review, saying: "With his customary in-depth archival research — in this case, relying on masses of recently declassified documents from the period of British rule and of the first Arab–Israeli war, 1917–49 — clear presentation, and meticulous historical sensibility, Karsh argues the opposite case: that Palestinians decided their own destiny and bear near-total responsibility for becoming refugees."

== Reception ==
Howard Sachar described Karsh as "the preeminent scholar-spokesman of the Revisionist (politically-rightist) Movement in Zionism."

Prominent New Historian Benny Morris called Karsh's Fabricating Israeli History "a mélange of distortions, half-truths, and plain lies that vividly demonstrates his profound ignorance of both the source material... and the history of the Zionist-Arab conflict," titling his article "Undeserving of a Reply". Morris adds that Karsh belabors minor points while ignoring the main pieces of evidence.

Political scientist Ian Lustick commented that Karsh's writing in Fabricating Israeli History was malevolent, and his analysis erratic and sloppy.

Yezid Sayigh, professor of Middle East studies, wrote that Karsh "is simply not what he makes himself out to be, a trained historian (nor political/social scientist)." Karsh accused Sayigh of a "misleading misrepresentation of my scholarly background" and retorted that Sayigh's remarks were "not a scholarly debate on facts and theses but a character assassination couched in high pseudo-academic rhetoric".

In a review of Rethinking the Middle East, El-Sayed el-Aswad writes "It seems, in many cases, that whatever does not match the author's views is charged with fraud and deception".

== Published works ==
=== Books ===
- Palestine Betrayed (Yale University Press, 2010). read online
- Islamic Imperialism: A History (Yale University Press, 2006). read online
- La Guerre D'Oslo (Les Editions de Passy, 2005; with Joel S. Fishman). read online
- Arafat’s War: The Man and His Battle for Israeli Conquest (Grove, 2003). read online
- Rethinking the Middle East (Cass, 2003). read online
- The Arab-Israeli Conflict. The Palestine War 1948 (Oxford, Osprey, 2002) - republished under the new title The Arab-Israeli Conflict. The 1948 War (Rosen Publishing Group, 2008). read online
- The Iran-Iraq War, 1980-1988 (Oxford, Osprey, 2002). read online
- Empires of the Sand: The Struggle for Mastery in the Middle East, 1789–1922 (Harvard University Press, 1999; with Inari Rautsi-Karsh) read online
- Fabricating Israeli History: The "New Historians" (Cass, 1997; 2nd ed. 2000) read online
- Israel at the Crossroads, with Gregory Mahler, ( I.B. Tauris, 1994)
- The Gulf Conflict 1990–1991: Diplomacy and War in The New World Order (Princeton University Press, 1993; with Lawrence Freedman);
- Saddam Hussein: A Political Biography (The Free Press, 1991; with Inari Rautsi-Karsh). read online
- Soviet Policy towards Syria Since 1970 (Macmillan & St. Martin's Press, 1991). ISBN 978-0-333-52297-4
- Neutrality and Small States (Routledge, 1988). ISBN 978-0-415-61199-2
- The Soviet Union and Syria: The Asad Years (Routledge for the Royal Institute of International Affairs, 1988).
- The Cautious Bear: Soviet Military Engagement in Middle East Wars in the Post 1967 Era (Westview, 1985).

=== Articles ===
- "Arafat Lives", Commentary, January 2005, pp. 33–40. Reprinted in Ha-Umma (Hebrew)
- "Israel's Arabs v. Israel", Commentary, December 2003, pp. 21–27]
- What Occupation?
- Dear Diary: Juan Cole's Bad Blog
- "Were the Palestinians Expelled?"
- "European Misreading of the Israeli-Palestinian Conflict: Finnish Foreign Minister Tuomioja – A Case Study"
- Beirut Bob, a review by Karsh of Robert Fisk's The Great War for Civilisation.
- "From Oslo to Be’eri: how the 30-years-long peace delusion led to Hamas’s 10/7 massacres" (Oct 2024)

=== Interview ===
- Sky News, Efraim Karsh debates 1948 with Ilan Pappe on Sky News
