= Alan Dowty =

American professor and political scientist (born 1940)

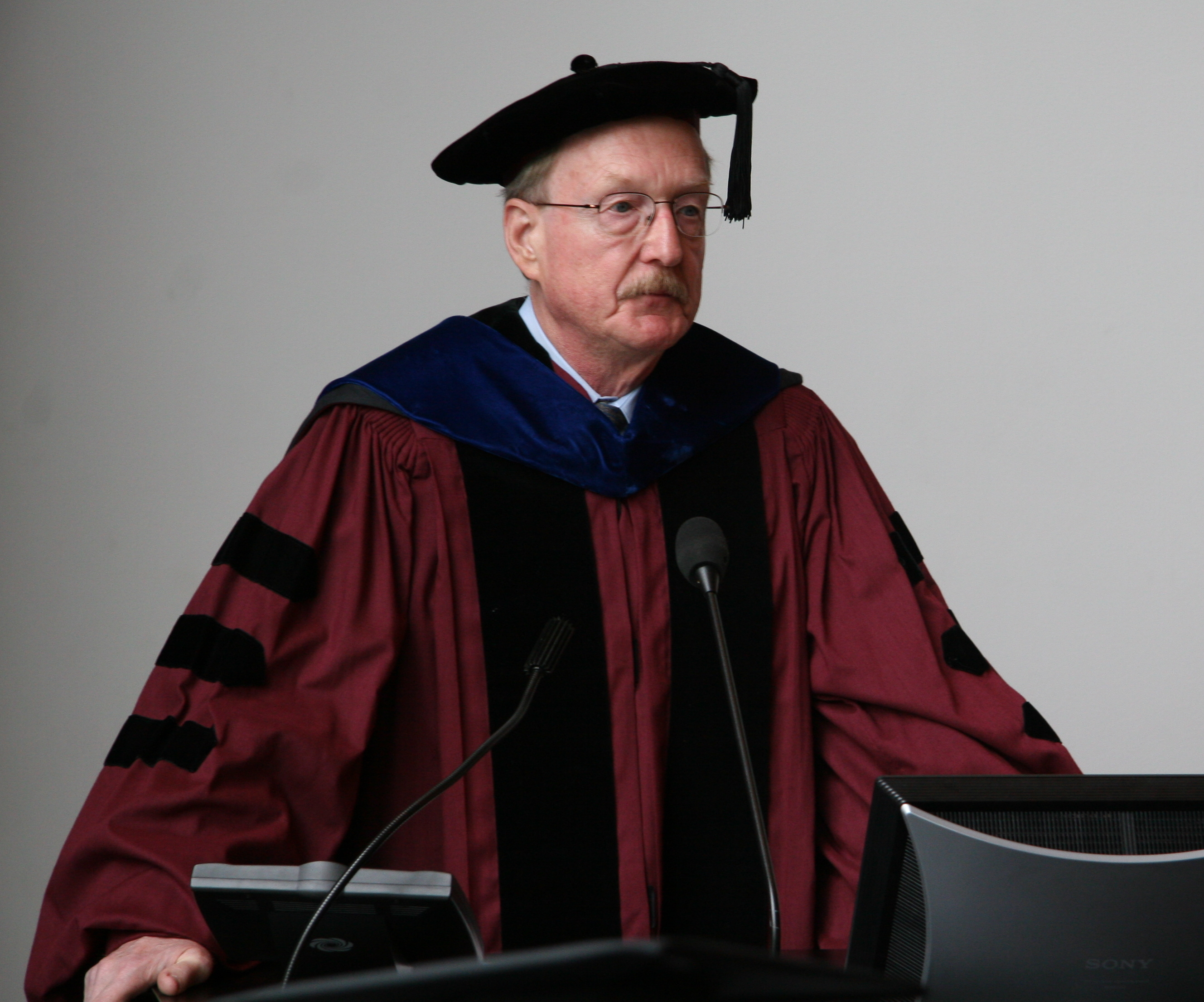
- Dowty in 2008
- Born: January 15, 1940 (age 86)
- Education: Shimer College (BA); University of Chicago (MA, PhD)
- Occupations: Professor; political scientist
- Years active: 1964–present

Alan Dowty (born January 15, 1940) is an American author, historian and professor of international relations and political science emeritus at the University of Notre Dame. He was formerly on the faculty of the Hebrew University of Jerusalem (1964–1975), Kahanoff Chair Professor of Israel Studies at the University of Calgary (2003–2006), and President of the Association for Israel Studies (2005–2007). In 2017 he was awarded a lifetime achievement award in Israel Studies by the Association for Israel Studies and the Israel Institute.

His recent work specialises in and focuses on Israeli–American relations, Israel and the history of Zionism, Israeli politics and the Arab–Israeli conflict.

== Early life and education ==
Dowty earned a B.A. from Shimer College (1959) and an M.A. and Ph.D. from the University of Chicago (1960, 1963).

== Career ==
From 1964 to 1975 he was on the faculty of the Hebrew University in Jerusalem, during which time he served as Executive Director of the Leonard Davis Institute for International Relations and Chair of the Department of International Relations.

He has been based at the University of Notre Dame since 1975. He returned to Shimer College to teach in 1966 and in 2013, and has also held visitorships at Tel Aviv University, the University of Chicago, Northeastern Illinois University, the University of Illinois at Chicago Circle, the Adlai Stevenson Institute of International Affairs, the Twentieth Century Fund, the University of Haifa, National Defense University, the Oxford Centre for Hebrew and Jewish Studies, Brandeis University, the State University of New York at Buffalo, and the Catholic University of America.

== Major publications ==
- The Limits of American Isolation, (New York University Press, 1971)
- Middle East Crisis: U.S. Decision Making in 1958, 1970, and 1973, (University of California Press, 1984)
- Closed Borders: The Contemporary Assault on Freedom of Movement, (Yale University Press, 1987)
- The Jewish State: A Century Later, (University of California Press, 1998, 2001)
- Israel/Palestine, (Polity Press, 2005, 2008, 2012, 2017, 2023)
- The Arab-Israel Conflict, Oxford Bibliographies in Political Science (Oxford University Press, 2013, 2015, 2019).
- Editor, The Israel/Palestine Reader, (Polity Press), 2019
- Arabs and Jews in the Ottoman Empire: Two Worlds Collide (Indiana University Press), 2019
- Israel, (Polity Histories), 2021
