= James L. Gelvin =

American historian of the Middle East (born 1951)

- Born: February 12, 1951 (age 75)
- Occupation: Historian

Academic background
- Education: Columbia University (BA, MA); Harvard University (PhD)

Academic work
- Sub-discipline: History of the Middle East
- Institutions: University of California, Los Angeles

James L. Gelvin (born February 12, 1951) is an American scholar of Middle Eastern history. He has been a faculty member in the department of history at the University of California, Los Angeles (UCLA) since 1995 and has written extensively on the history of the modern Middle East, with particular emphasis on nationalism and the social and cultural history of the modern Middle East.

== Biography ==
Gelvin earned his B.A. from Columbia University in 1983, M.A. from the School of International and Public Affairs of Columbia University in 1985, and Ph.D. from Harvard University in 1992. Before joining the faculty at UCLA, Gelvin taught at the Massachusetts Institute of Technology (MIT), Boston College, and Harvard University. He has been a fellow at the Woodrow Wilson International Center for Scholars (1999–2000) and the recipient of a U.C. President's Fellowship in the Humanities (1999–2000). In 2002–2003, he was Sheikh Zayed bin Sultan Al Nahyan Visiting professor of history at the American University in Beirut.

== Awards ==
In 2015, the Middle East Studies Association honored Gelvin with its Undergraduate Teaching Award, citing his "outstanding commitment to the practice and substance of undergraduate teaching, through his classroom performance, his training of future generations of undergraduate teachers, and his well-received undergraduate textbooks....James Gelvin's accomplishments as a teacher and the teaching materials he has produced for others exemplify the kind of undergraduate teacher this award is meant to recognize." Gelvin also received the Faculty Excellence Award, presented by the UCLA chapter of Mortar Board National Senior Honor Society in 1998.

== Works by Gelvin ==
=== Books ===
- The Contemporary Middle East in an Age of Upheaval (editor, Stanford University Press, 2021).
- The New Middle East: What Everyone Needs to Know (Oxford University Press, 2017).
- Global Muslims in the Age of Steam and Print, 1850–1930 (co-editor, University of California Press, 2013).
- The Arab Uprisings: What Everyone Needs to Know (Oxford University Press, 2012, 2015).
- Israel Palestine Conflict: One Hundred Years of War (Cambridge, ENG: Cambridge University Press, September 2005, 2007, 2013, 2021).
- The Modern Middle East: A History (New York: Oxford University Press, 2004, 2007, 2010, 2015, 2020).
- Divided Loyalties: Nationalism and Mass Politics in Syria at the Close of Empire (Berkeley: University of California Press, 1998).

=== Articles ===
- "The Arab Uprisings: Lessons to be Learned (and Unlearned)", Forum: "Arab Springs", Il Mestiere di Storico 5:1 (March 2013).
- "'Modernity,' 'Tradition,' and the Battleground of Gender in Early Twentieth-Century Damascus", Die Welt Des Islams (Winter 2012).
- "'Coup-Proof?" History Today (August 2011).
- "Nationalism, Anarchism, Reform: Understanding Political Islam from the Inside Out", Middle East Policy XVII, 3 (Fall 2010).
- "'Arab Nationalism' Meets Social Theory", "Pensée: 'Arab Nationalism': Has a New Framework Emerged?", International Journal of Middle East Studies 41 (2009).
- "Al-Qaeda and Anarchism: A Historian's Reply to Terrorology", and "Al-Qaeda and Anarchism: A Historian's Reply to Terrology: Response to Commentaries", Terrorism and Political Violence 20:4 (2008).
- "The Politics of Notables Forty Years After", Middle East Studies Association Bulletin, 40:1 (June 2006).
- "Globalization, Religion, and Politics in the Middle East: The Current Crisis in Historical Perspective", Global Development Studies (Winter 2004/Spring 2005).
- "Islamism and Nationalism: Common Roots, Common Destinies", Beiruter Blaetter: Mitteilungen des Orient-Institutes Beirut, 10–11 (March 2004).
- "Zionism and the Representation of 'Jewish Palestine' at the New York World's Fair, 1939-1940" The International History Review XXII:1 (March 2000).
- "Modernity and Its Discontents: On the Durability of Nationalism in the Arab Middle East", Nations and Nationalism 5:1 (January 1999).
- "The League of Nations and the Question of National Identity in the Fertile Crescent", in World Affairs (Summer 1995).
- "The Social Origins of Popular Nationalism in Syria: Evidence for a New Framework", in International Journal of Middle East Studies (November 1994).
- "Demonstrating Communities in Post-Ottoman Syria", in The Journal of Interdisciplinary History XXV:I (Summer 1994).

=== Chapters in edited volumes ===
- "A New Middle East?" in James L. Gelvin (ed.), The Contemporary Middle East in an Age of Upheaval (Stanford: Stanford University Press, 2021).
- "The Syrian civil war and the New Middle East", in James L. Gelvin (ed.), The Contemporary Middle East in an Age of Upheaval (Stanford: Stanford University Press, 2021).
- "The Arab Uprisings of 2010-11", in David Motadel (ed.), Revolutionary World: Political Upheaval in the Global Age (Cambridge University Press, 2021).
- "Religion, State, and Society in the New Middle East", in Catalin-Stefan Popa (ed.), From Polarization to Cohabitation in the New Middle East (Harrassowitz Verlag, 2020).
- "Nationalism in the Arab Middle East: Resolving Some Issues", in Larbi Sadiki (ed.), Routledge Handbook on the Politics of the Middle East (Abingdon, Oxon, UK: Routledge, 2020).
- "Comprendiendo las insurrecciones árabes", in G. Conde et al. (eds.), Mundo árabe: Levantamientos populares, contextos, crisis y reconfiguraciones (Ciudad de México: El Colegio de México/CIDE, 2015).
- "Was There a Mandates Period? Some Concluding Thoughts", in Cyrus Schayegh and Andrew Arsan (eds.) The Routledge Handbook of the History of the Middle East Mandates (New York: Routledge, 2015).
- "Reassessing the Recent History of Political Islam in Light of the Arab Uprisings", in Fahed Al-Sumait et al. (eds.), Conceptualizing the Arab Uprisings: Origins, Dynamics, and Trajectories (New York: Rowman & Littlefield, 2014).
- "The Arab World at the Intersection of the Transnational and National", in David W. Lesch and Mark Haas (eds.), The Arab Spring: Change and Resistance in the Middle East (Boulder, CO: Westview Press, 2012)
- "American Global Economic Policy and the Civic Order in the Middle East", Michael Bonine et al., Is There a Middle East? (Stanford, CA: Stanford University Press, 2012).
- "The Middle East Breasted Discovered", in Geoff Emberling and John Larson (eds.), Pioneers to the Past: American Archaeologists in the Middle East, 1919–20 (Chicago: Oriental Institute, 2010).
- "Resolution of the Syrian General Congress—1919", in Neil Schlager (ed.), Milestone Documents in World History (Dallas: Schlager Group, 2010).
- "Post Hoc Ergo Propter Hoc?: Reassessing the Lineages of Nationalism in Bilad al-Sham", in Thomas Philipp and Christoph Schumann (eds.), From the Syrian Land to the State of Syria (Würtzburg: ERGON Verlag, 2004).
- "T. E. Lawrence and Historical Representation", in Charles Stang (ed.), The Waking Dream of T. E. Lawrence: Essays on His Life, Literature, and Legacy (New York: St. Martin's Press, 2002).
- "Secularism and Religion in the Arab Middle East: Reinventing Islam in a World of Nation States", in Derek R. Peterson and Darren Walhof (eds.), The Invention of Religion: Rethinking Belief and Politics in History (New Brunswick, NJ: Rutgers University Press, 2002).
- "Developmentalism, Revolution, and Freedom in the Arab Middle East: The Cases of Egypt, Syria, and Iraq", in Robert H. Taylor (ed.), The Idea of Freedom in Asia and Africa (Stanford: Stanford University Press, 2002).
- "(Re)Presenting Nations: Demonstrations and Nationalisms in Pre-Mandate Syria", in F. Moge Gocek (ed.), Social Constructions of Nationalism in the Middle East (Albany: SUNY Press, 2002).
- "Napoleon in Egypt as History and Polemic", in Irene Bierman (ed.), Napoleon in Egypt (Reading, ENG: Ithaca Press, 2003).
- "The Other Arab Nationalism: Syrian/Arab Populism in Its Historical and International Contexts" in James Jankowski and Israel Gershoni (eds.), Rethinking Nationalisms in the Arab World (New York: Columbia University Press, 1997).
- "The Ironic Legacy of the King-Crane Commission", in David W. Lesch (ed.), The United States in the Middle East: A Historical Reassessment (Boulder: Westview Press, 1995).

=== Audio books ===
- "Palestine, Zionism, and the Arab-Israeli Conflict", 24-part lecture series, The Teaching Company, 2002. According to the author's UCLA homepage
