= Gregory Mahler =

American political scientist

Gregory S. Mahler
- Born: August 12, 1950 (age 76); Palo Alto, California, United States
- Education: Oberlin College
- Scientific career
- Fields: political science, Canadian Studies, Israeli politics, parliamentary studies
- Workplaces: Earlham College

Gregory S. Mahler is an American political scientist with a general interest in comparative politics, and more specific interests in legislatures and constitutionalism.

== Education ==
Mahler completed his undergraduate studies at Oberlin College and received his M.A. and Ph.D. degrees from Duke University.

== Career ==
Mahler taught political science at the University of Vermont for 12 years, then moved to the University of Mississippi where he served as Chair of the Political Science Department. He subsequently moved to Kalamazoo College, where he served as the Chief Academic Officer of the College for ten years. Thereafter he moved to Earlham College, in Richmond, Indiana, where he is a former Academic Dean and Vice President for Academic Affairs.

Professor Mahler's scholarly work has been published widely. He has contributed to numerous journals and edited volumes, and has authored or edited over twenty-five books that fall into three broad groups: comparative politics, politics of Israel and the Middle East, and politics of Canada. In 1996 he was a visiting professor at the Hebrew University of Jerusalem, at which time he also served as a visiting scholar at the Palestinian Academic Society for the Study of International Affairs where he ran a workshop and authored a book titled Constitutionalism and Palestinian Constitutional Development. Dr. Mahler was one of the co-founders of the Association for Israel Studies in the United States, and served as President of that group for a two-year period. He also served as President of the Association for Canadian Studies in the United States.

Mahler has lectured widely on Israeli politics, the Middle East peace process, constitutional development, Canadian politics, Quebec politics, and many other topics. In addition to numerous speaking engagements in the United States, he has lectured in such foreign settings as Albania, Amsterdam, Beijing, Cardiff, Côte d'Ivoire, Jerusalem, Liberia, Mauritania, Mexico City, Minsk, Moldova, Moscow, Port-of-Spain, and Tel Aviv.

Mahler has had numerous grants to support his research over the years, including support from the U.S. Department of Education (two Fulbright grants), the U.S. Department of State, the Government of Canada, the Organization of American States, the Government of Israel, the Palestinian Academic Society for the Study of International Affairs, and the U.S.S.R. Institute for the Study of the U.S. and Canada.

== Books ==
- Comparative Politics: Exploring Concepts and Institutions Across Nations (6th ed., Lynne Riener Pub., 2019)
- Principles of Comparative Politics (Pearson, 2013)
- The Arab-Israeli Conflict An Introduction and Documentary Reader (with Alden R. W. Mahler, Routledge, 2008; 2nd ed., 2018)
- Politics and Government in Israel: The Maturation of a Modern State (Rowman & Littlefield, 2004; 3rd ed., 2016)
- Israel in the Nineties: Development and Conflict (edited with Frederick Lazin, University of Florida Press, 1996)
- Contemporary Canadian Politics, 1988–1994: An Annotated Bibliography (Greenwood Press, 1995)
- Israel at the Crossroads (edited with Efraim Karsh, British Academic Press, 1994)
- Israel after Begin (edited, State University of New York Press, 1990)
- Israel: Government and Politics in a Maturing State (Harcourt Brace Jovanovich, 1990)
- Contemporary Canadian Politics: An Annotated Bibliography, 1970–1987 (Greenwood Press, 1988)
- New Dimensions of Canadian Federalism: Canada in a Comparative Perspective (Fairlegh Dickinson Press, 1987)
- Bibliography of Israeli Politics (Westview Press, 1985)
- Comparative Politics: An Institutional and Cross-National Approach (Schenkman Pub. Co., 1983; Prentice Hall, 2008)
- Readings in the Israeli Political System: Structures and Processes (edited, University Press of America, 1982)
- The Knesset: Parliament in the Israeli Political System (Fairleigh Dickinson Press, 1981)
