= Polarized and Demobilized =

2019 non-fiction book

Polarized and Demobilized: Legacies of Authoritarianism in Palestine
- Author: Dana El Kurd
- Publisher: Oxford University Press
- Publication date: 2019
- ISBN: 978-0-19-009586-4
- OCLC: 1132785828

Polarized and Demobilized: Legacies of Authoritarianism in Palestine is a non-fiction book by Dana El Kurd. It was published in 2019 by Oxford University Press.

== General references ==
- Blaydes, Lisa (July 2021). "Polarized and demobilized: Legacies of authoritarianism in Palestine, DanaEl Kurd, New York, NY: Oxford University Press, 2019. 226 p. $60.00 (cloth)". Governance. 34 (3): 952–954. doi:10.1111/gove.12626. ISSN 0952-1895.
- Mhajne, Anwar (2020). "Review of Polarized and Demobilized: Legacies of Authoritarianism in Palestine". AlMuntaqa. 3 (1): 91–93. doi:10.31430/almuntaqa.3.1.0091. ISSN 2616-8073.
- Musleh, Abeer R (2022-05-27). "Polarized and demobilized: Legacies of authoritarianism in Palestine: by Dana El Kurd, London, Hurst & Co. Publishers, 2019, 226 pp., GBP 45.00 (hardback), ISBN 9781787382138". Mediterranean Politics. 27 (3): 413–415. doi:10.1080/13629395.2020.1783829. ISSN 1362-9395.
- Tessler, Mark (November 2022). "Polarized and Demobilized: Legacies of Authoritarianism in Palestine. Dana El Kurd (London: Hurst, 2019). Pp. 240. £45.00 hardback. ISBN: 9781787382138". International Journal of Middle East Studies. 54 (4): 806–808. doi:10.1017/S0020743823000119. ISSN 0020-7438.
