= Henry Laurens (scholar) =

French historian and author

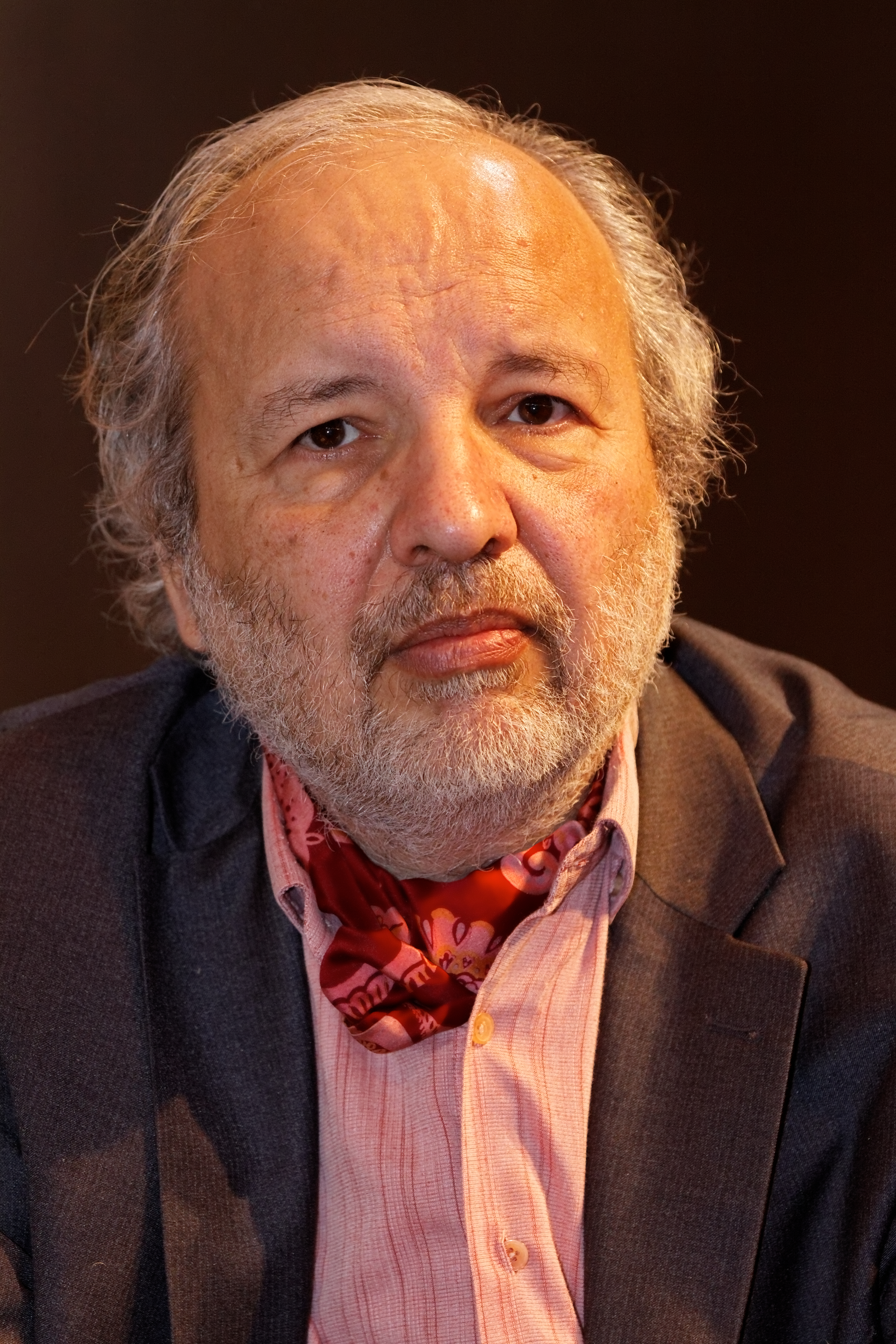
Henry Laurens at a conference in Paris, 2012

Henry Laurens (born 1954, Neuilly-sur-Seine) is a French historian and author of several histories and studies about the Arab-Muslim world. He is Professor and Chair of History of the Contemporary Arab world at the Collège de France, Paris.

== Biography ==
After attending the Lycée Carnot and the literary preparatory classes at the Lycée Louis-le-Grand in Paris, from 1973 to 1976, Henry Laurens pursued history studies at the University of Paris-Sorbonne, where he successively obtained a bachelor's degree (1976), a master's degree (1977), a DEA (1979), and the *agrégation* (1980).

Laurens earned his degree of Arab civilization from the National Institute of Oriental Languages and Civilizations (INALCO) in Paris. From 1981 to 1983, he studied and taught abroad in Damascus and Cairo. He was awarded his doctorate, with high distinction, in 1989 at the Sorbonne–Paris IV, with a thesis on The French Revolution and Islam : History and Meanings of the Egyptian Expedition, 1798-1801.

From 1981 to 1982, Henry Laurens was Scholarship student at the French Institute of Arab Studies in Damascus and from 1982 to 1983, he was French lecturer at Cairo University. From 1983 to 1990, he was assistant professor in contemporary history at the Paris-Sorbonne University. Professor of Late modern period at Institut national des langues et civilisations orientales from 1991 to 2001, Henry Laurens is also the director of the Mediterranean Studies doctoral training there from 1992 to 1995 and the director of the North Africa Middle East department from 1992 to 1994. He has been a professor at the Collège de France since 2003.

A member of the French National Centre for Scientific Research since 1991, of the Scientific Commission for Diplomatic Archives of the Ministry for Europe and Foreign Affairs since 2011 and of the board of directors of the Sciences Po since 2016, he is also on the editorial board of the journal Maghreb-Machrek.

Laurens specializes in several related areas of research: European-Ottoman contacts in the 19th century, Franco-Arab relations, Middle-Eastern politics, European thought in the 18th and 19th centuries and the history of modern Palestine. His five-volume work La Question de Palestine was published in 1999–2015 and covers 19th- and 20th-century Palestinian history.

== His stance on the Palestinian question ==
Henry Lawrence devoted a significant portion of his work to studying the Palestinian question, addressing it within its broader historical, political, and cultural context. His analyses were not limited to the development of the Arab-Israeli conflict, but also addressed the transformations that the Arab and Islamic world had undergone, along with the evolution of Jewish thought since the late 18th century, with the aim of highlighting the complexity of the Palestinian question and its entanglement with international rivalries, and placing it within its regional and historical framework.

== Honours and awards ==
=== Honours ===
- 2011 : Knight of the Legion of Honour (France)
- 2024 : Officier of the National Order of Merit (France)

=== Awards ===
- 2004 : Prize Joseph-du-Teil of the Académie des Sciences Morales et Politiques
- 2016 : Grand prix Gobert of the Académie Française
- 2017 : Prize Auguste-Pavie of the Académie des sciences d'outre-mer
- 2019 : Phoenix Prize for Literature (Lebanon)
- 2021 : Mahmoud Darwich Prize (Palestine)

=== Acknowledgement ===
- Member of the Académie des sciences d'outre-mer
- Member of the high scientific council of the Institut du Monde Arabe
- Foreign Associate of the Academy of the Kingdom of Morocco

== Main publications ==
- Aux sources de l'orientalisme : la Bibliothèque orientale de Barthélemi d'Herbelot, Paris : Maisonneuve et Larose, 1978.
- Les Origines intellectuelles de l'expédition d'Égypte : l'orientalisme islamisant en France (1698-1798), Istanbul-Paris : Isis, 1987.
- Kléber en Égypte : Kléber et Bonaparte, Cairo : Institut français d'archéologie orientale, 1988.
- Le Royaume impossible : la France et la genèse du monde arabe, Paris : Armand Colin, 1990.
- Le Grand Jeu : Orient arabe et rivalités internationales, Paris : Armand Colin, 1991.
- Lawrence en Arabie, Paris : Découvertes Gallimard, 1992.
- L'Orient arabe : arabisme et islamisme de 1798 à 1945, Paris : Armand Colin, 1993.
- Kléber en Égypte : Kléber commandant en chef, Cairo : Institut français d'archéologie orientale, 1995.
- L'expédition d'Égypte (1798-1801), Paris : Seuil, 1997.
- Campagnes d'Égypte et de Syrie de Napoléon Bonaparte [critical edition], Paris : Imprimerie nationale, 1998.
- Le Retour des exilés, la lutte pour la Palestine de 1869 à 1997, Paris : Robert Laffont, 1998.
- Paix et Guerre au Moyen-Orient, l'Orient arabe et le monde de 1945 à nos jours, Paris : Armand Colin, 1999.
- La Question de Palestine, Paris : Fayard, 1999–2015 (5 volumes).
- L'Orient arabe à l'heure américaine. De la guerre du Golfe à la guerre d'Irak, Paris : Armand Colin, 2004.
- Orientales I : autour de l'expédition d'Égypte, Paris : French National Centre for Scientific Research, 2004.
- Orientales II : la IIIe République et l'Islam, Paris : French National Centre for Scientific Research, 2004.
- Orientales III : parcours et situations, Paris : French National Centre for Scientific Research, 2004.
- Histoire du monde arabe contemporain, Paris : Fayard/Collège de France, 2004.
- Les relations entre les États-Unis et le monde arabe, Tunis : Tunisian Academy of Sciences, Letters, and Arts, 2004.
- L'Empire et ses ennemis, Paris : Seuil, 2009.
- Le rêve méditerranéen : grandeurs et avatars, Paris : French National Centre for Scientific Research, 2009.
- Orients, Paris : French National Centre for Scientific Research, 2009.
- Terrorismes : histoire et droit [editing and direction], Paris : French National Centre for Scientific Research, 2010.
- La Question d'Orient. Discours et articles politiques (1834-1861) : Alphonse de Lamartine, Brussels : André Versaille, 2011.
- Français et arabes depuis deux siècles : la chose franco-arabe, Paris : Tallandier, 2012.
- Histoires orientales, Paris : L'Orient des livres / Actes Sud, 2013.
- Ernest Renan. La science, la religion, la République [editing and direction], Paris : Odile Jacob, 2013.
- Europe and the Islamic world: A history, Princeton : Princeton University Press, 2013.
- Méditerranées politiques, Paris : Presses universitaires de France, 2017.
- Orientales IV : L’Orient dans tous ses états, Paris : French National Centre for Scientific Research, 2017.
- Les crises d'Orient. Tome 1 : 1768-1914, Paris : Fayard, 2017.
- Les crises d'Orient. Tome 2 : La naissance du Moyen-Orient (1914-1949), Paris : Fayard, 2019.
- Le passé imposé, Paris : Fayard, 2022.
- Question juive, problème arabe (1798-2001), Paris : Fayard, 2024.

== See also ==
- List of Islamic studies scholars (Non-Muslims)
