= La Question de Palestine =

Series of history books by Henry Laurens

- L'invention de la Terre sainte; Une mission sacrée de civilisation; L'accomplissement des prophéties; Le rameau d'olivier et le fusil du combattant; La paix impossible
- Author: Henry Laurens
- Country: France
- Language: French
- Genre: History
- Publisher: Fayard
- Published: 1999–2015

La Question de Palestine (lit. 'The Question of Palestine') is a series of five history books about Palestine, written by the French scholar Henry Laurens and published by Fayard from 1999 to 2015.

== Summary ==
The books are organised chronologically and cover Palestinian history from 1799 to 2001. Laurens breaks down Palestinian and broader Middle Eastern history into time periods that can span months, weeks or days, analyzing them as brief eras with distinct themes.

The title is derived from a terminology that has been used since 1815, and more specifically refers to a speech by David Ben-Gurion, Israel's first prime minister, who said that the greatest achievement of Zionism was that it replaced the Jewish question with "the question of Palestine".

== Publication ==
- L'invention de la Terre sainte (lit. 'The Invention of the Holy Land') was published on 7 April 1999 and covers 1799–1922.
- Une mission sacrée de civilisation (lit. 'A Sacred Mission of Civilisation') was published on 27 March 2002 and covers 1922–1947.
- L'accomplissement des prophéties (lit. 'The Fulfillment of Prophecies') was published on 13 June 2007 and covers 1947–1967.
- Le rameau d'olivier et le fusil du combattant (lit. 'The Olive Branch and the Fighter's Rifle') was published on 5 October 2011 and covers 1967–1982.
- La paix impossible (lit. 'The Impossible Peace') was published on 23 September 2015 and covers 1982–2001.

An abridged version of La Question de Palestine was published in 2024 in one 756 pages long volume, titled Question juive, problème arabe (1798–2001).
