= Rebecca L. Stein =

American academic

Rebecca L. Stein is a cultural anthropologist and media studies scholar. She is a Professor of Cultural Anthropology at Duke University.

== Education and career ==
Stein holds a B.A. (summa cuma laude) from Amherst College (1991) and a Ph.D. from the Program in Modern Thoughts and Literature at Stanford University (1999). Before her graduate work, she worked for two years as the English-language editor of Challenge Magazine: A Magazine of the Israeli Left, based in Jerusalem. Stein is also a member of the core faculty in the Duke Center for Jewish Studies and core faculty of the Duke Middle East Studies Center.

Stein’s research focuses on Israeli cultural politics in the context of Zionist settler-nationalism and Palestinian dispossession and the legacy of the Israeli military occupation. Her first monograph, Itineraries in Conflict, examined how Jewish Israeli tourist practices of the 1990s were a means of navigating Israel’s changing relationship to Palestinians and the broader Arab World. Informed by post-colonial critiques, Stein frames Israeli tourist routes through neighboring Arab countries and Palestinian communities as an unstable, yet politically charged, forms of settler nationalism.

Anthropologist Charles Hirshkind called Itineraries in Conflict “a groundbreaking work. . . . Stein provides the reader with a powerful and insightful analysis of the cultural forms and practices through which a shifting geographic imaginary comes to be instantiated within Israeli public life.” Stein would write a number of additional articles on these themes, including on Zionist hiking as practices of territorial conquest in pre-1948 Palestine, Israeli tourism-politics in the immediate aftermath of the 1967 occupation of the Palestinian territories and during the 1982 Invasion of Lebanon, and the Airbnb market in the Jewish settlements.

In the early 2010s, Stein’s research turned to the politics of digital media in Israel. Digital Militarism: Israel’s Occupation in the Social Media Age examined how Israeli Jews supported and sustained Israel’s military rule over the occupied Palestinian territories on social media—using selfies, memes and popular platforms. Stein and Kuntsman coin the phrase “selfie militarism,” which Jenna Brager from The New Inquiry calls "a useful insertion in the perplexing scene of soldier narcissism." Miriam Aouragh lauded the broader publication as a "fast paced, concise, and sharp book" which "stands apart through its scholarly treatment and theoretical framing (about memory, time, and digital archiving)" that "are interwoven with media and communication themes and enriched by recollections of dramatic events that draw on alternative Israeli sources." Oren Livio discussed how Digital Militarism "continues – and in some places kicks off – an important theoretical conversation regarding the interplay of social media, technology and ideology."

Stein’s latest book, Screen Shots: Israeli State Violence on Camera in Israel and Palestine, is an ethnographic account of Israel’s occupation in the age of smart-phone witnessing, chronicling how various actors across the political spectrum – from Jewish settlers and soldiers, to Palestinian activists and human rights workers – learned to employ digital photographic technologies as part of their political toolboxes. Historian of photography Issam Nasser called the book a “must read for anyone interested in Palestine.” Artist and writer Liat Berdugo praised Screen Shots as “meticulously researched, ethnographically focused and well-written case studies” that “detail how camera dreams have swept Israel and Palestine and how those dreams have come undone.”

Stein is also the co-editor of two volumes on Israeli and Palestinian politics and Society: Palestine, Israel and the Politics of Popular Culture and The Struggle for Sovereignty: Palestine and Israel, 1993-2005.

Stein has served on the editorial committee of the Middle East Report and on the board of directors of PARC: The Palestinian-American Research Center

Her popular writings on Israeli cultural politics have appeared in the London Review of Books blog, OpenDemocracy, and Middle East Report.

== Books ==
- Stein, Rebecca L. (2021). Screen Shots: State Violence on Camera in Israel and Palestine. Stanford: Stanford University Press. ISBN 978-1-5036-1497-0.
- Kuntsman, Adi; Stein, Rebecca L. (2015). Digital Militarism: Israel's Occupation in the Social Media Age. Stanford: Stanford University Press. ISBN 978-0-8047-8567-9.
- Stein, Rebecca L. (2008). Itineraries in Conflict: Israelis, Palestinians, and the Political Lives of Tourism. Duke University Press. doi:10.1215/9780822391203. ISBN 978-0-8223-4251-9.
- Joel Beinin and R.L. Stein, editors, The Struggle for Sovereignty: Palestine and Israel, 1993-2005. Stanford: Stanford University Press. 2006. ISBN 978-0-8047-5364-7.
- R.L. Stein and Ted Swedenburg, editors, "Palestine, Israel, and the Politics of Popular Culture". Duke University Press.
