= Yosef Weitz =

Israeli civil servant

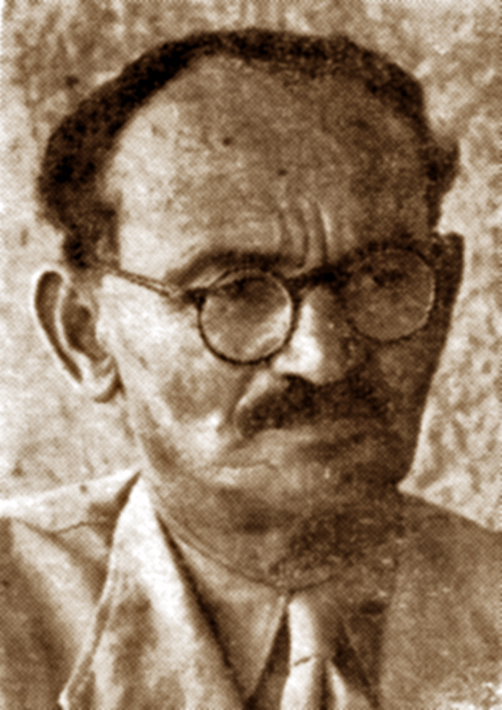
Yosef Weitz, 1945

Yosef Weitz (Hebrew: יוסף ויץ, sometimes transliterated as Joseph Weitz or Joseph Weits; 1890–1972) was the director of the Land and Afforestation Department of the Jewish National Fund (JNF). From the 1930s, Weitz played a major role in acquiring land for the Yishuv, the pre-state Jewish community in the British Mandate of Palestine.

In 1932, when Weitz joined the JNF, there were only 91,000 Jews in Palestine (about 10% of the population) who owned just 2% of the land. Weitz oversaw the program to purchase properties from absentee landlords and run the Palestinian tenant farmers off their land. However it soon became clear that the purchase of small lots of land would not get close to fulfilling the Zionists' dream of creating a Jewish-majority state in the region of Palestine and that it would be necessary to force the exodus of the Arab population.

Due to Weitz's role in the expulsion of Palestinian Arabs in 1948, he became known as the "Architect of Transfer". He also became known as the "Father of the Forests" for his work in afforestation, which was done largely to cover up the destroyed Palestinian villages.

== Early years ==
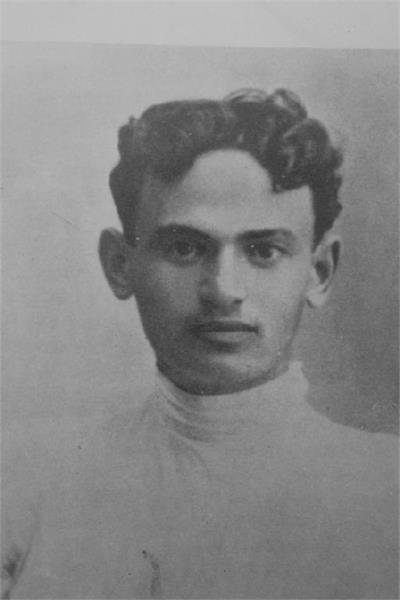
Yosef Weitz in his youth

Yosef Weitz was born in Boremel, Volhynia in the Russian Empire in 1890. In 1908, he immigrated to Palestine with his sister, Miriam, and found employment as a watchman and an agricultural laborer in Rehovot. In 1911, he was one of the organizers of the Union of Agricultural Laborers in Eretz Yisrael. Weitz married Ruhama and their eldest son, Ra'anan, was born in 1913. Two years later, in 1915, Yosef Weitz was appointed foreman of the Sejera training farm (now Ilaniya) in the Lower Galilee. Weitz helped to found Yavniel, one of the first pioneer colonies in the Galilee, and later, the Beit Hakerem neighborhood in Jerusalem. His son Yehiam (Hebrew for "long live the nation"), born in Yavne'el in October 1918, was killed in a Palmach operation known as the Night of the Bridges on June 16, 1946. Kibbutz Yehi'am was established in his memory. Sharon Weitz, another of his sons, followed in his father's footsteps and later became director of the Forestry Department.

== Vision ==
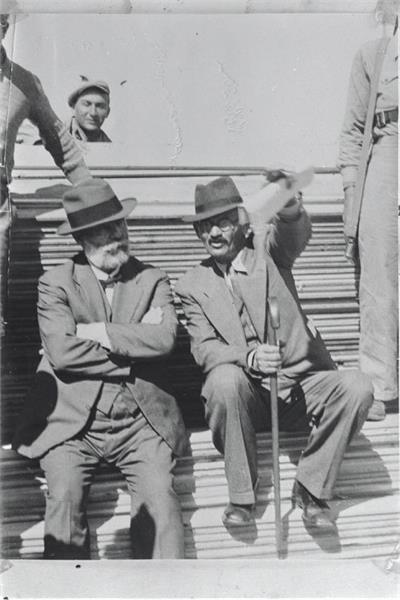
Yosef Weitz (right) with Menachem Ussishkin on a visit to Hanita, 1938

During the 1948 Palestine war, ~750,000 Palestinians fled or were expelled from the newly created Jewish state. Weitz firmly believed that Israel should not allow them to return, and he convinced Israeli leaders to raze the empty Palestinian homes and villages in order to prevent the return of the refugees.

== Public service career ==
As head of the JNF Forestry Department, Weitz put his visions of Israel as a forested country into practice. He wanted to plant millions of trees not just to decorate the Israeli landscape, but also to cover up the emptied Palestinian villages that had been destroyed so they could never be rebuilt.

On April 18, 1948, Weitz wrote about the list of villages he wanted to be ethnically cleansed first:

I made a summary of a list of the Arab villages which in my opinion must be cleared out in order to complete Jewish regions. I also made a summary of the places that have land disputes and must be settled by military means.

He was spurred on by David Ben-Gurion, who told Weitz he wanted a billion trees planted within a decade. In 1949, he proposed a division of labor between the Israeli government and the JNF. The government would engage in applied research in planting techniques, especially in arid areas, and the development of a timber industry. It would also establish plant nurseries. The JNF would improve indigenous forests, work in afforestation of hilly regions, stop the encroachment of sand dunes and plant windbreakers. Weitz saw plant nurseries and afforestation as a vital source of employment for the masses of new immigrants arriving in the early days of the state. He was guided by the belief that developing a work ethic was imperative for acculturation.

In 1966, Yatir Forest in the Negev was planted at Weitz's urging. He "envisioned rolling back the desert with trees, creating a security zone for the people of Israel". Named for the biblical town of Yatir, it is now Israel's largest planted forest.

Weitz's forestry strategy emphasized the economic utility of forests and the importance of the Aleppo pine as the hardiest of local species. As a result, Israel’s forests for its first twenty years were largely monocultures and were later affected by natural pests. Weitz frequently clashed with the nascent conservation movement which objected to the Jewish National Fund's approach to tree planting, such as pine tree plantations on Mount Gilboa which threatened an endemic plant, Iris haynei (also known as Iris Gilboa).

== Views and opinions ==
Weitz was an advocate of population transfer. As the 1948 Palestine war unfolded, he confided to his diary in April that he had drawn up a list of Arab villages to be cleansed to enable Jewish settlement, and had also drawn up a list of land disputes with Arabs that he thought should be resolved by military means. According to Nur Masalha and Benny Morris an unofficial Transfer Committee was established in May 1948 composed of Weitz, Danin and Sasson. Historian Efraim Karsh however, wrote that although Weitz spoke of establishing a transfer committee, Ben-Gurion rejected the idea, and no such committee was ever established.

In his capacity as director of the Forestry Department, he initiated projects to destroy Arab property, ordering personnel to create obstacles for Arabs attempting to return to cultivate their fields, to destroy villages, and to render habitable other villages in order to enable Jewish settlement. He had discussed these activities with Ben-Gurion on June 8, and according to his diary, gained the latter's approval. On June 22, 1941 he wrote in his diary: "The land of Israel is not small at all, if only the Arabs were removed, and its frontiers enlarged a little, to the north up to the Litani, and to the east including the Golan Heights...with the Arabs transferred to northern Syria and Iraq...Today we have no other alternative...We will not live here with Arabs."

With regard to the problem of expelled Palestinians endeavouring to return later in 1948, Weitz suggested to Ben-Gurion on September 26 that a policy of relentless harassment (hatrada) by every available means was necessary in order to quash any such return.

== Commemoration ==
The Ma'ale Yosef Regional Council and Moshav Talmei Yosef are named for Yosef Weitz.

== Blue Box ==
Weitz's great-granddaughter, Michal Weits, directed a documentary, Blue Box (Israel/Canada/Belgium 2021, 82 minutes), on her great-grandfather's role in the acquisition of land in Palestine, both before and after the creation of the State of Israel. The film's title refers to the Jewish National Fund's 'Blue Boxes', which were used in a successful fundraising campaign to support the purchase of land in Palestine. Yosef Weitz was the man who orchestrated the acquisition of land from absentee landowners, which generally involved the eviction of tenant farmers, as he himself recorded in his private diaries.

== Published works ==
- My Diary and Letters to the Children, vols 1-6, Masada, Ramat Gan, 1965, 1973 (the original diaries are in the Central Zionist Archives in Jerusalem).
- HaYa'ar V'haYiur B'Yisrael (The Forest and Forestry in Israel), Masada, Ramat Gan, 1970 p. 140-141.
- Journal entry from June 26, 1946 published in Tlamim Ahronim, Jerusalem, Keren Kayemet, 1974, p. 24-25.
- From Small to Large - The History of Land Reclamation in Eretz-Israel, Ramat Gan, 1972
- Creating a Land Legacy - Chapters from a Diary, Tel Aviv, 1951
- Our Settlement Activities in a Period of Storm and Stress, 1936-1947, Tel Aviv, 1947

== Bibliography ==
- Masalha, Nur (1992). Expulsion of the Palestinians: The Concept of "Transfer" in Zionist Political Thought, 1882-1948 (PDF). Institute for Palestine Studies. ISBN 0-88728-235-0.
- Morris, Benny (1994). "Chapter 4: Yosef Weitz and the Transfer Committees, 1948-1949". 1948 and after: Israel and the Palestinians. ISBN 9780198279297.
- Morris, Benny; Kedar, Benjamin Z. (19 September 2022). "'Cast thy bread': Israeli biological warfare during the 1948 War". Middle Eastern Studies. 59 (5): 23 n.91. doi:10.1080/00263206.2022.2122448.
- Pappé, Ilan (2006). The Ethnic Cleansing of Palestine. ISBN 9781851684670.
- Segev, Tom (1986). 1949, The First Israelis. New York: The Free Press. pp. 29–30. ISBN 9780029291801.
- Tal, Alon (2002). Pollution in a Promised Land, An Environmental History of Israel. Berkeley: University of California Press.
