= Old Motza Synagogue =

Synagogue in West Jerusalem

- Hebrew: בית הכנסת העתיק מוצא
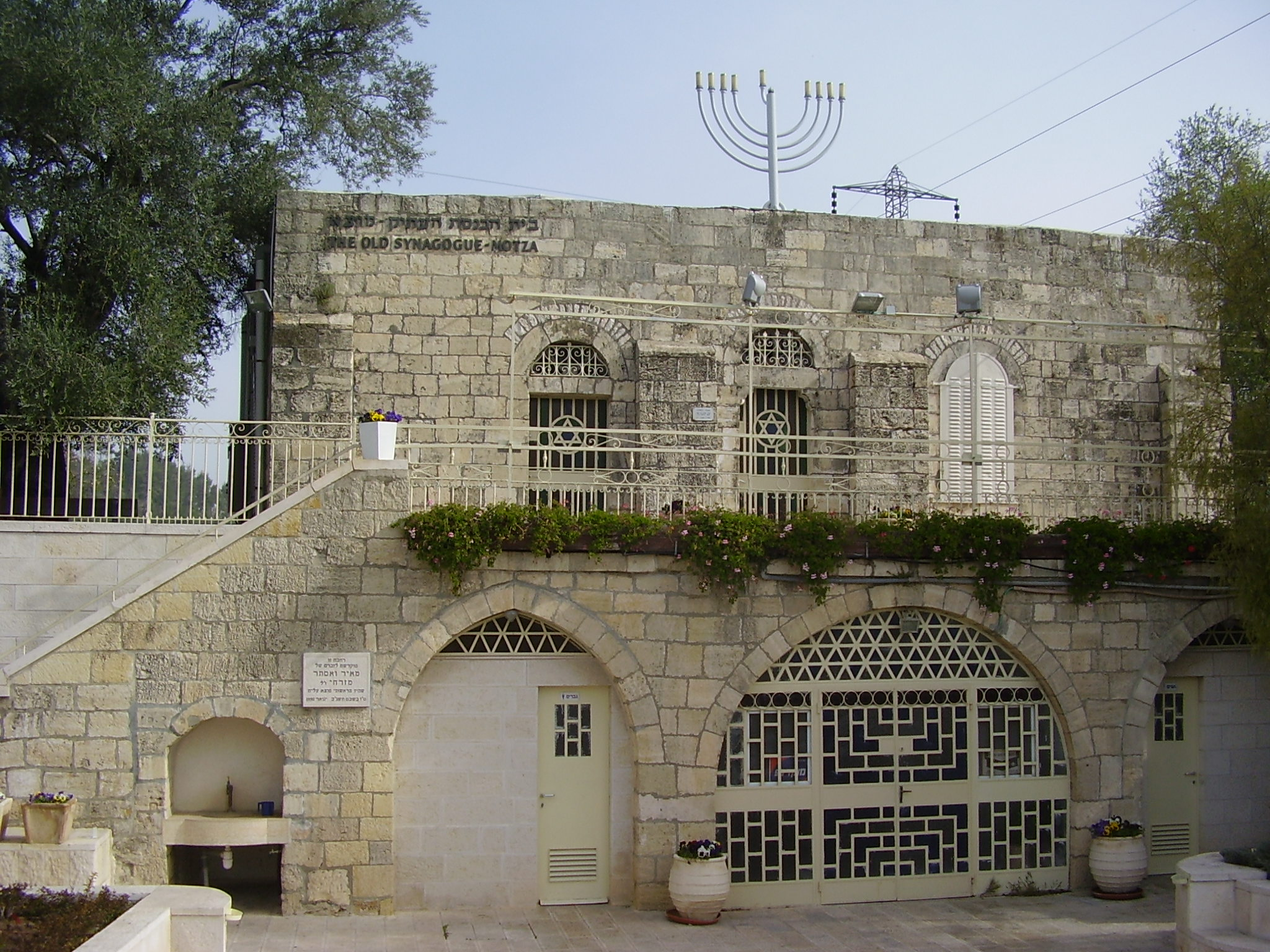

- Location of the synagogue in Jerusalem

Religion
- Affiliation: Judaism
- Ecclesiastical or organizational status: Synagogue (1871–1929); Profane use 1929–1961); Synagogue (since 1961)
- Status: Active

Location
- Location: Motza, West Jerusalem
- Country: Israel
- Interactive map of Old Motza Synagogue
- Coordinates: 31°47′32″N 35°09′51″E

Architecture
- Architect: Yehoshua Yellin
- Type: Synagogue architecture
- Completed: 1871

The Old Motza Synagogue (Hebrew: בית הכנסת העתיק מוצא) is Jewish congregation and synagogue, located in Motza, in West Jerusalem, Israel. Completed in 1871, the Ottoman-era synagogue is just off Highway 1.

== History ==
=== Ottoman and British periods ===
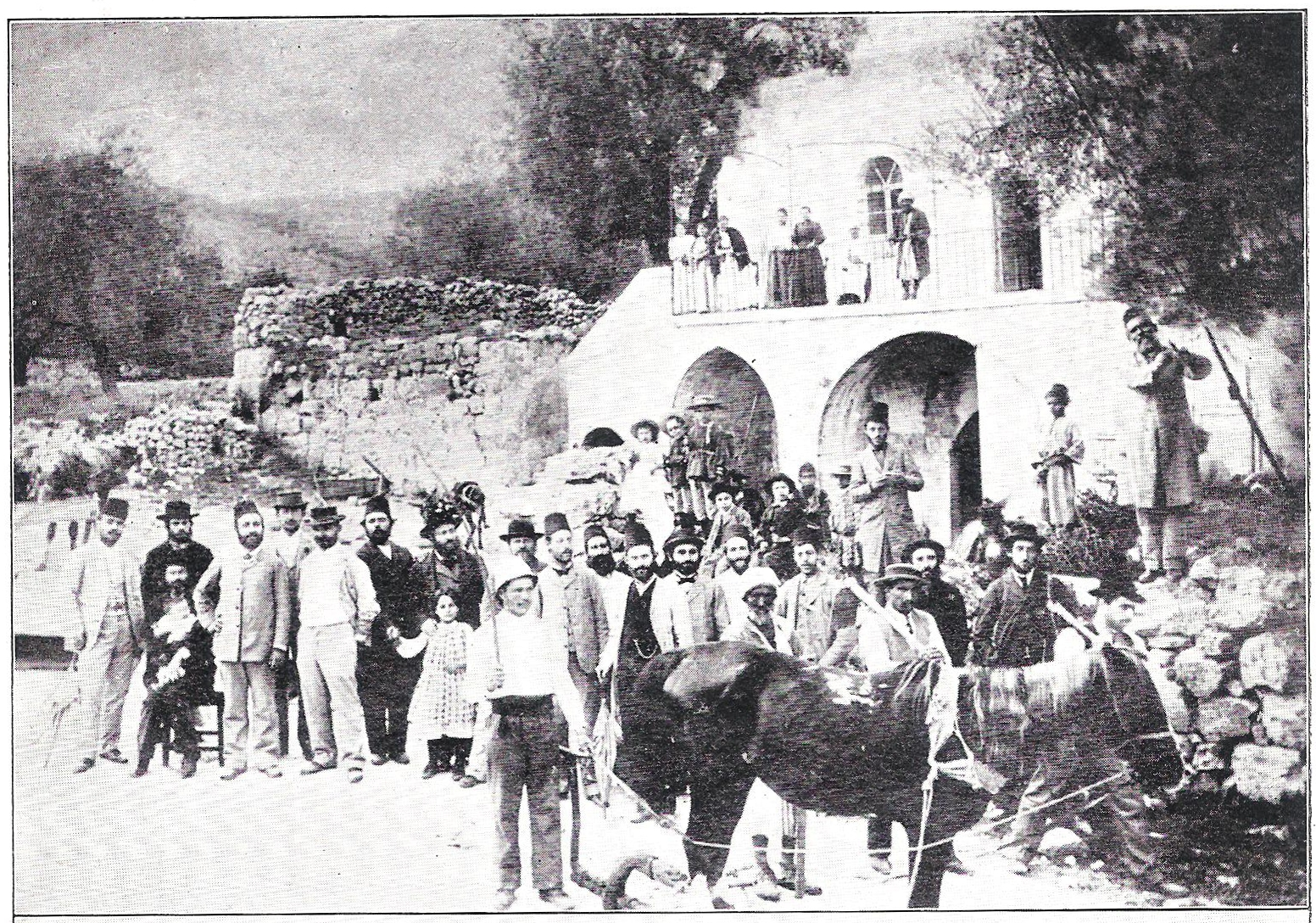
Residents of Motza in front of the temple c. 1895

In 1871, a caravanserai was built in the city of Motzah, and the year of its founding is engraved in a stone on the arch of the modern-day building that is used as the synagogue. It was built on the foundation of a Crusader-era building. The modern building was built by Yehoshua Yellin to serve as an inn for travellers along the Yafo-Jerusalem road. In 1905, a group of tourists arrived at the inn, including Rabbi Binyamin Ze'ev Kraus of Debrecen and Rabbi Shlomo Tzvi Shik of Kartzag. They were informed that there was no synagogue in the neighborhood, and Kraus began fundraising to build a synagogue in the caravanserai. The establishment by Kraus and Shik is commemorated on a memorial at the building.

The building served as a synagogue for Jews of the Old Yishuv, and was abandoned due to violence towards Jews in the 1929 Palestine pogrom. The building became part of the Arab settlement of Kalonia, now Mevaseret Zion. In 1961, when Jews returned to the area, the building was renovated and converted back into a synagogue. In 1973, archaeological excavations were carried out near the synagogue, where many artifacts from the period of Roman settlement were discovered.

=== Modern usage ===
The synagogue is used for typical Shabbat services, and is used as an event venue for religious lectures and celebrations for locals in the area. On the wall of the outer synagogue is a presentation of the history of the families of the first Jewish settlers to the area, and in front is a mosaic describing the location of the synagogue relative to the Motza Valley.

== See also ==
- History of the Jews in Israel
- List of synagogues in Israel
- Synagogues of Jerusalem
