= Yehoshua Yellin =

Jewish developer (1843–1924)

- יהושע ילין
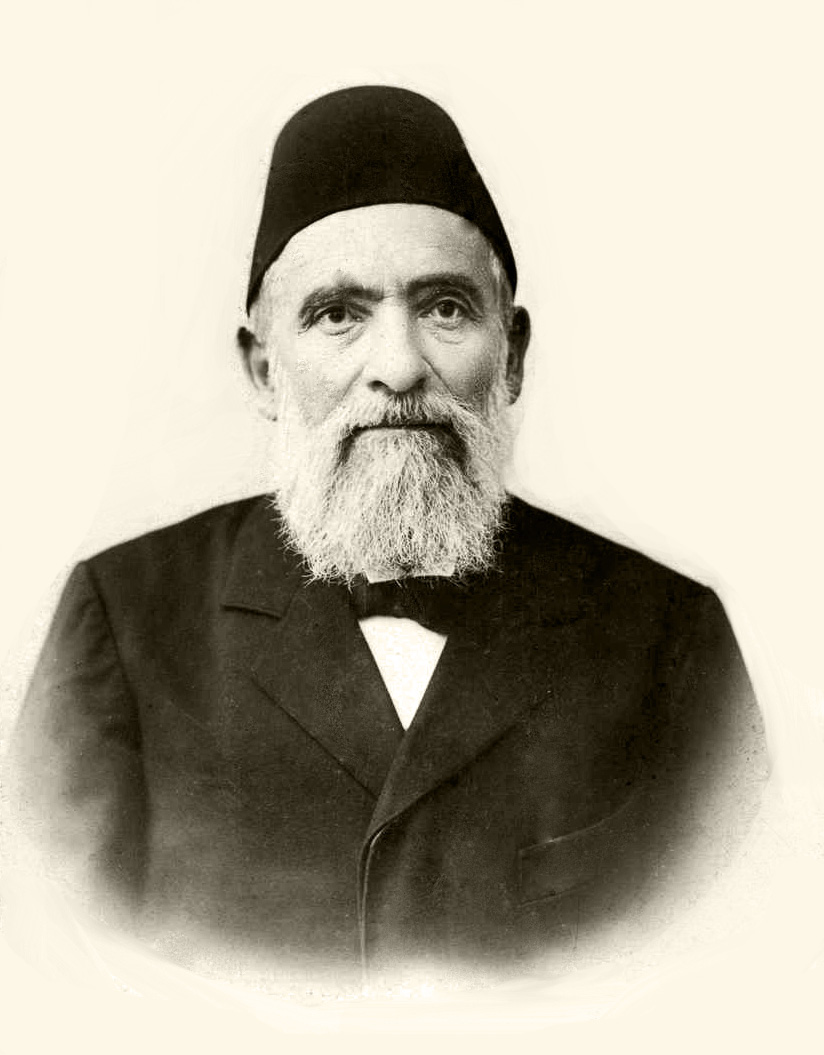
- Born: July 21, 1843; Jerusalem, Ottoman Empire
- Died: May 11, 1924 (aged 80); Jerusalem, Mandate for Palestine
- Occupation: Businessman
- Years active: 1860–1900
- Spouse: Sarah Yehuda
- Children: David Yellin; Rachel Danin
- Parents: David Yellin (father); Liba (mother)

Yehoshua Yellin (Hebrew: יהושע ילין; Yiddish: יהושע יעלין; July 21, 1843 – May 11, 1924) was a leader of the Old Yishuv movement and a developer of land in 19th-century Jerusalem.

== Early life ==
Yellin was born in Jerusalem on July 21, 1843, the son of David Yellin and his wife Liba, 19 years after his older sister Chava. 9 years prior, the family had immigrated from Łomża. At the age of 13, he was matched to his future wife Sarah, the daughter of Rabbi Shlomo Yehezkel Yehuda. The arranged marriage of two Jews from Poland and Ottoman Baghdad was considered special and unusual for the era.

== Career ==
=== Land management ===
In 1860, his father, in partnership with his brother-in-law Shaul Yehuda, bought an olive grove in the village of Qalunya in the greater Jerusalem area. On the land he purchased, many Jewish initiatives came to fruition, such as the town of Motza and its associated synagogue. David had planned to build a farm and an inn on the land, but pillaging by the Pasha of Jerusalem and by the sheikh of Abu Ghosh destroyed the funds meant to develop the land further. Yehuda died suddenly in 1864 at the age of 24, leaving Yellin to take over the management duties of Motza.

Yellin was one of seven founders of Nahalat Shiva, another neighborhood in Jerusalem. He also participated in the initial development of Even Yisrael, and was an early investor of land in Mea Shearim. In 1872, with a number of colleagues, he worked to help plan a sale to buy land in Jericho from the Ottoman government. They called the initiative "Petah Tikva", but when the government learned that the sale was to non-Ottoman subjects, they canceled the sale. Years later, another initiative formed the modern-day city of Petah Tikva, although Yellin was not involved in that project.

=== Agricultural initiatives and Mazkeret Moshe Company ===
In 1872, Yellin leased land in partnership with Benjamin Salant and Isaac Goldschmidt through Bedouin contacts in Transjordan to grow grain for food. Two years later, he was forced to retire from the agricultural initiative when his other partners retired, although he maintained business relations with the Bedouins of the region. In 1881, he travelled to India to visit wealth relatives of his wife, the Sassoon family. When he returned, he began a partnership with Naftali Leon and established a tobacco business and a tannery. During those years, he served as the British consul's representative in the Commercial Tribunal of the Ottoman government.

He joined the initiative known as the 'Mazkeret Moshe Company' in 1884. It was an organization which built Jewish neighborhoods with funds from the Moses Montefiore Foundation. He would later build his home in the Mazkeret Moshe neighborhood, which was developed by the organization, leaving the Old City. He sold 70 dunams of land he purchased in Qalunya in 1891, to the Hovevei Zion Association, and later liquidated all of his holdings in that land to them, on which the Motza colony was founded. In 1897, he was elected to serve as a member of the municipality of Jerusalem, making him the first Ashkenazi Jew to hold that position.

== Family ==
Together, Yehoshua and his wife Sarah had a son, David Yellin, named after Yellin's late father, and a daughter, Rachel. David was married to the daughter of Yechiel Michel Pines. Rachel was married to Yehezkel Danin, and they became founders of Ahuzat Bayit, and the parents of Ezra Danin.

Yellin died on May 11, 1924, in Jerusalem.

== Sources ==
- Yaari, Avraham (1946). מסעות ארץ ישראל של עולים יהודים [Travels in the Land of Israel by Jewish Immigrants] (in Hebrew). Tel Aviv: Gazit. OCLC 19200976.
