= Transfer Committee =

Body to promote Palestinian displacement

The Transfer Committee was established during the 1948 Palestine war by non-Cabinet members of the first government of Israel, with the aim of overseeing the expulsion of Palestinian Arabs from their towns and villages, and preventing their return. The extent to which the committee acted with the knowledge of the prime minister and the Cabinet is a matter of scholarly debate.

== Creation of the committee ==
The idea for the committee came from Yosef Weitz, the director of the Land and Afforestation Department of the Jewish National Fund. From the 1930s onwards, Weitz had played a major role in acquiring land for the Yishuv, the Jewish community in Palestine.

The first, unofficial, committee was composed of Weitz; Ezra Danin, head of the Arab section of the SHAI, the intelligence arm of the Haganah; and Eliyahu Sasson, head of the Middle East Affairs Department of the Foreign Ministry. Danin told Weitz that to prevent the return of the refugees who had already left, they must be "confronted with a fait accomplis." He proposed the destruction of Arab homes, settling Jewish immigrants in evacuated areas, and expropriating Arab property.

=== Proposals to Cabinet ===
On May 28, 1948, Weitz proposed to Moshe Sharett, then foreign minister, that the committee be made official. On May 30, Weitz met Eliezer Kaplan, the finance minister, and reportedly received his blessing. The Transfer Committee met for its first working session that day, though it was still not authorized by David Ben-Gurion, the prime minister, or the full Cabinet. Nevertheless, Benny Morris writes that the committee set about razing villages.

On June 5, Weitz approached Ben-Gurion with a three-page proposal that involved preventing the Arabs from returning; helping them to be absorbed into other Arab countries; destroying villages as much as possible during military operations; preventing Arabs from cultivating land; settling Jews in empty villages and towns so that no "vacuum" would be created; enacting legislation to prevent the return of the refugees; and creating propaganda aimed at non-return.

Morris writes that Weitz recorded Ben-Gurion's agreement, though according to Morris, Ben-Gurion wanted to focus first on the destruction of Arab villages, and only later on helping the residents to resettle in other Arab countries. Ben-Gurion's account of the meeting was different: he said he had agreed to the establishment of a committee to oversee the "cleaning up" (nikui) of Arab towns and villages and their settlement by Jews, but said he had nowhere explicitly referred to the destruction of villages or preventing refugees from returning. Efraim Karsh writes that Ben-Gurion specifically told Weitz that he rejected the idea of the Transfer Committee. Karsh quotes Weitz as saying: "[Ben-Gurion] would like to convene a narrow meeting and to appoint a committee to handle the issue [the cleaning up or improvement of Arab villages]. He does not agree to the [existence] of our temporary committee."

== Destruction of villages ==
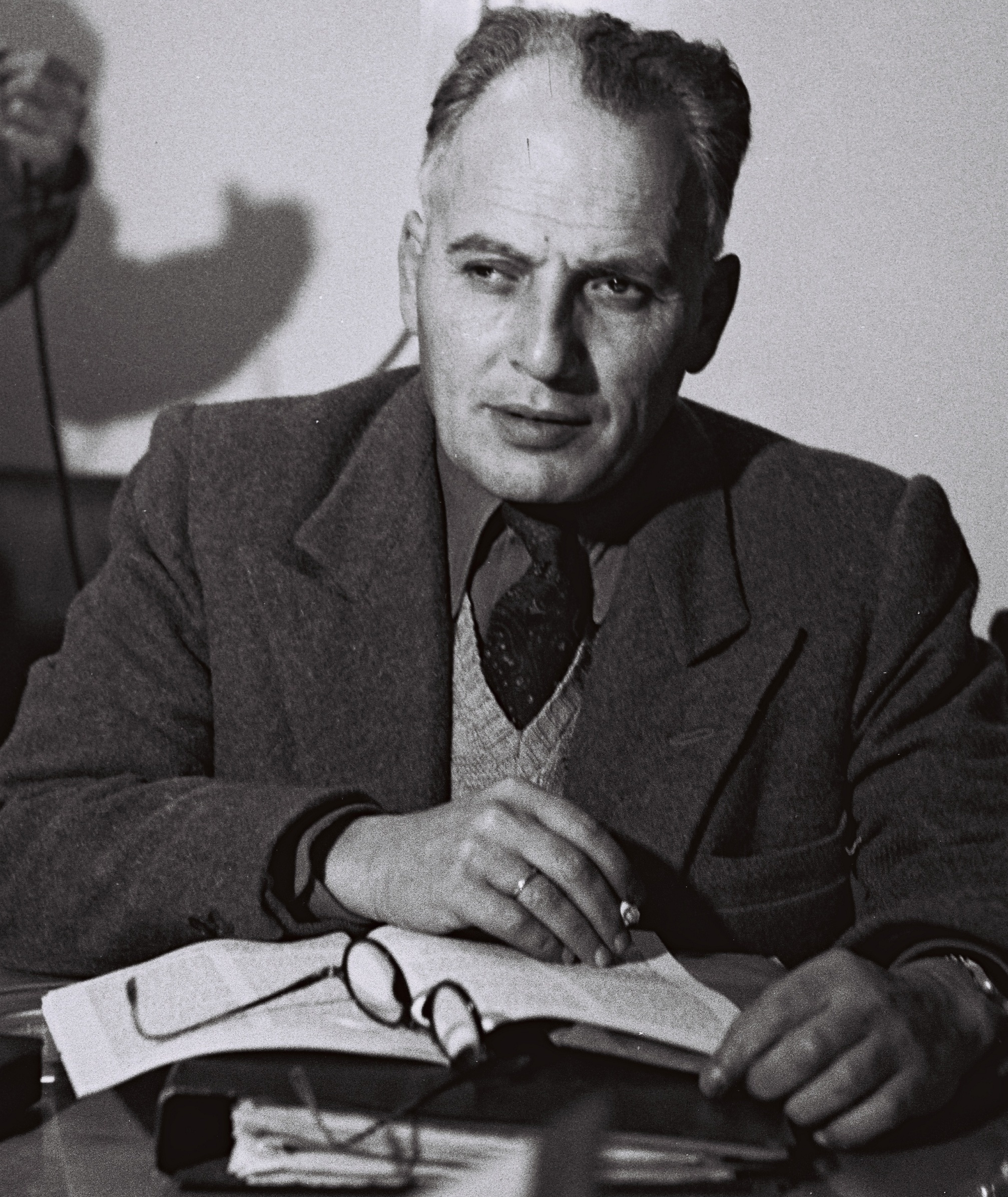
Minister for Minority Affairs Bechor-Shalom Sheetrit helped stop the activities of the committee.

Regardless of the committee's ambiguous status, Weitz proceeded to arrange the destruction of several villages in June 1948: al-Maghar, near Gedera; Fajja, near Petah Tikva; Biyar 'Adas, near Magdiel; Bayt Dajan, east of Tel Aviv; Miska, near Ramat Hakovesh; Sumeiriya, near Acre; and Buteimat and Sabbarin, near Haifa. Morris writes that Weitz's agents toured the countryside to determine which villages should be destroyed and which preserved for Jewish settlement.

=== Mapam objections ===
The political party Mapam, and Bechor-Shalom Sheetrit, Minister for Minority Affairs, launched a counter-campaign to stop the destruction, forcing Weitz to halt his activities, which effectively terminated the first unofficial Transfer Committee.

== See also ==
- 1948 Palestinian expulsion and flight
- List of villages depopulated during the Arab-Israeli conflict
- Land and Property Laws in Israel
