= B'nai B'rith Israel =

Jewish social service organization

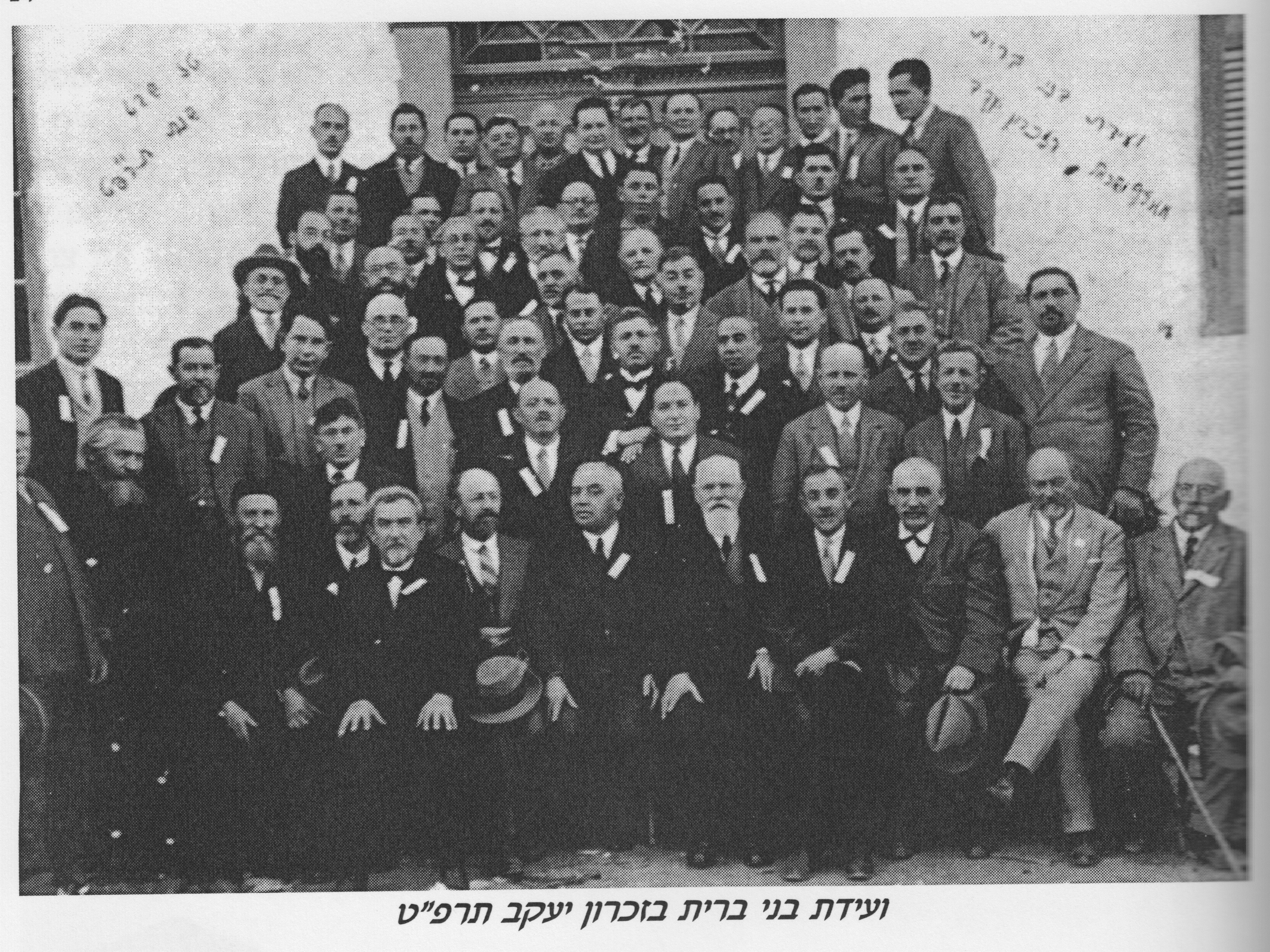
B'nai B'rith convention in Zikhron Ya'akov, 1929.

B'nai B'rith Israel was founded in 1888 as a regional division of B'nai B'rith International, a Jewish social service organization. It has been active in the State of Israel throughout the 20th Century and to the present day.

== History ==
B'nai B'rith Israel was founded in 1888 (138 years ago), with the Jerusalem Lodge being the first B'nai B'rith lodge in Israel. Among the lodge's early activities was the founding of a public library in Jerusalem in 1892. The library, known as Midrash Abarbanel, was the city's first free public library. The library later became the nucleus of the National and University Library.

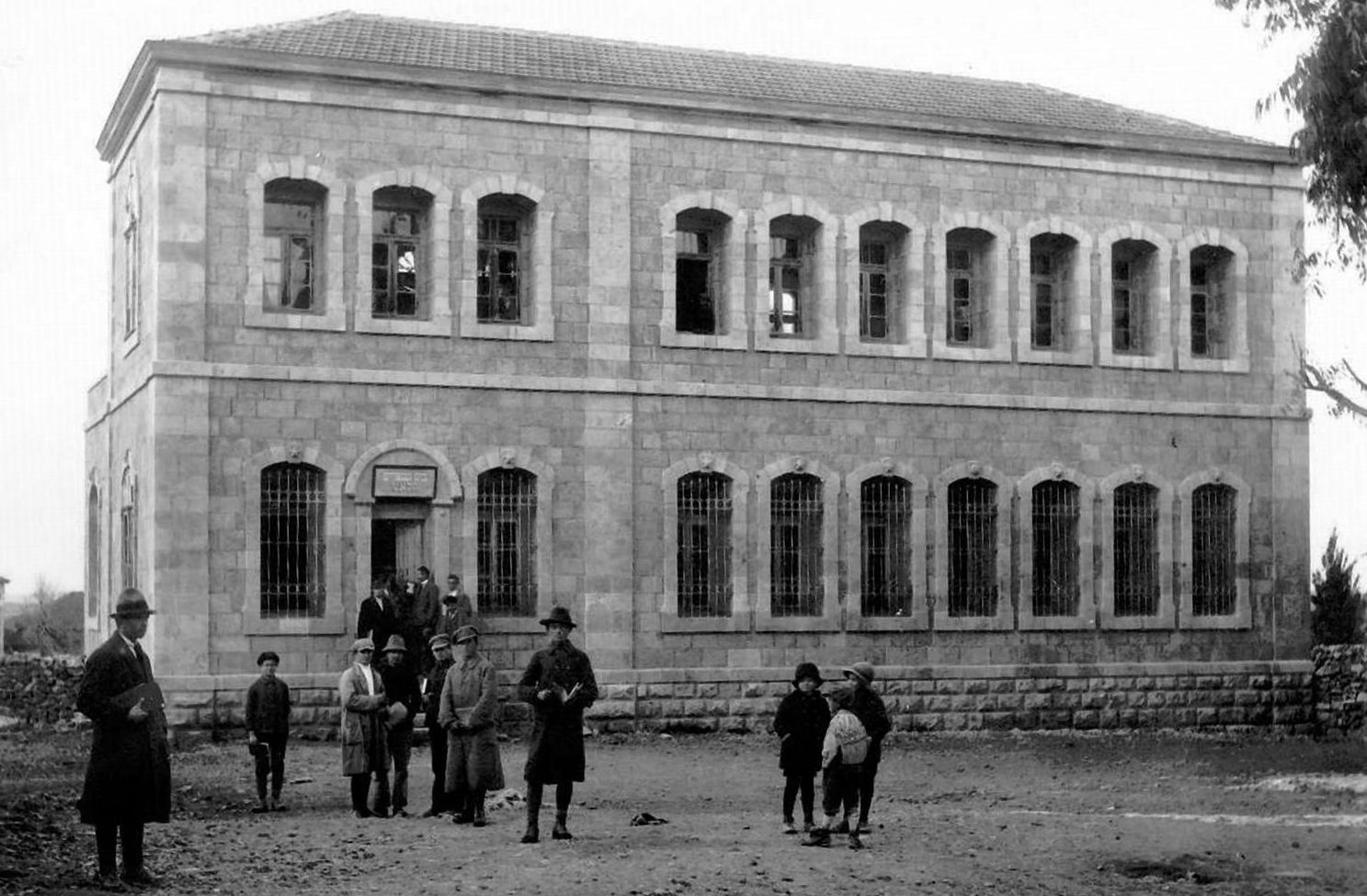
Midrash Abravanel (B’nai B’rith City Library) on HaHabashim Street in Jerusalem.

The lodge was also involved in establishing the first Hebrew kindergarten in Jerusalem and the purchase of land for a home for new immigrants known as Motza, a village near Jerusalem. In 1936, B'nai B'rith donated $100,000 to the Jewish National Fund to buy 1,000 acres in what was then Mandate Palestine, followed by an additional $100,000 in 1939. Following Israel's declaration of independence, B'nai B'rith members in the United States sent several ships loaded with $4 million worth of food, clothing, medical supplies, trucks and jeeps to the port of Haifa.

During the organisation's early days, at the urging of Eliezer Ben-Yehuda, the father of modern Hebrew, B'nai B'rith Israel adopted the Hebrew language for everyday business. Ben-Yehuda had served as the lodge secretary for the B'nai B'rith Jerusalem lodge, and as a result of his efforts, B'nai B'rith became the first Jewish organization in the Yishuv to incorporate Hebrew in such a manner. Since its founding, B'nai B'rith Israel has operated numerous social service programs in the country. Its philanthropic activities focus on assistance to the needy, to students, and to new immigrants.

In 1981, B'nai B'rith established the B'nai B'rith World Center in Jerusalem to serve as a permanent and centralised headquarters for its agencies and programs.

== B'nai B'rith International ==
Just prior to the creation of the State of Israel, President Harry S. Truman, resisting pressure by various organizations, declined meetings with Jewish leaders. B'nai B'rith President Frank Goldman convinced fellow B'nai B'rith member Eddie Jacobson, long-time friend and business partner of the president, to appeal to Truman for a favor. Jacobson convinced Truman to meet secretly with Zionist leader Chaim Weizmann in a meeting said to have resulted in turning White House support back in favor of partition, and ultimately to de facto recognition of Israeli statehood.

In 1959, B'nai B'rith became the first major American Jewish organization to hold a convention in Israel.

In 1978, six weeks after the signing of the Camp David Accords between Israel and Egypt, B'nai B'rith was the first Jewish group to visit Egypt at the invitation of President Anwar Sadat.

In 1980, nearly all nations removed their embassies from Jerusalem in response to the passage by the Knesset of the Jerusalem Law extending Israeli sovereignty over the entire city. B'nai B'rith responded with the establishment of the B'nai B'rith World Center in Jerusalem to serve as "the permanent and official presence of B'nai B'rith in Jerusalem".
