= Moshe David Gaon =

Israeli historian (1889–1958)

- משה דוד גאון
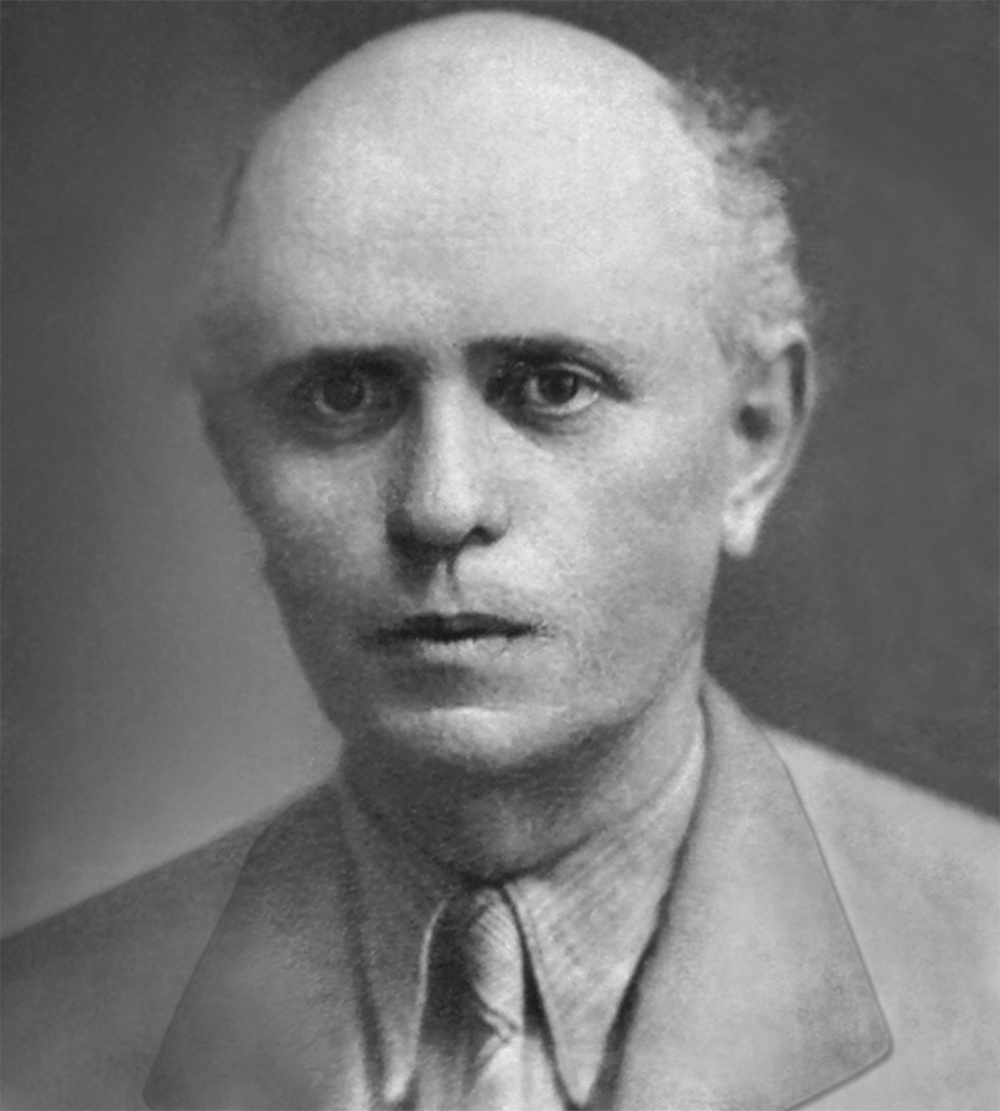
- Born: 6 September 1889; Travnik, Bosnia and Herzegovina, Austria-Hungary
- Died: October 8, 1958 (aged 69); Jerusalem, Israel
- Burial place: Har HaMenuchot
- Education: David Yellin College of Education
- Years active: 1908-1958
- Children: 2, including Yehoram

Moshe David Gaon (Hebrew: משה דוד גאון; 6 September 1889 – 8 October 1958) was a Bosnian-born Israeli historian, scholar of the Sephardic world, bibliographer, educator, journalist and poet. He was one of the pioneers of Ladino culture in Israel, and the father of businessmen Benny Gaon and Yehoram Gaon.

== Early life and career ==
Gaon was born in Travnik, then under Austro-Hungarian administration (now Bosnia and Herzegovina) to Chacham David and Rivka Gaon, Sephardi Jews, sages of Porat Yosef and Beit El, two Yeshivas in the Old City of Jerusalem. His family is descended from Spanish expellees to the Balkan region following the Inquisition. In his youth, he studied at both Talmudic and public schools.

When he turned 18, Gaon went to Vienna, intending to continue his studies, but ended up joining an academic association with other Balkan immigrants. Near the end of WWI, he emigrated to Israel, serving one year in the Ottoman army in Beer Sheva, and later studied at the Ezra Teachers' Seminary. At the outbreak of the War of the Languages, he joined the strikers, and completed his studies at the Seminar Beit Hakerem under the guide of David Yellin.

In 1921, he visited the newly-formed Yugoslavia, and returned to Jerusalem with his parents. He became the director of the Talmud Torah in İzmir, and published a Hebrew-language magazine, Hevranu, to help his students learn.

In subsequent years, upon his return to Israel, Gaon held various positions in the offices of Zionist movements' managements in Jerusalem. He was one of the members of the Hapoel Hatzair party until its merger with the Ahadot Ha'Avoda in 1930.

For several years, he served as a reporter for a number of international Ladino newspapers, including: Il Avinir and La Ipoca in Thessaloniki, Hashofer in Plovdiv, and Il Judio in Constantinople. Later in his career, he wrote articles for Harut.

Gaon was the first teacher of the children of Motza. The classroom was located in the Old Motza Synagogue, he would spend time in Motza during the week for teaching, and would return on Shabbat to Jerusalem. He taught for 4 years.

In 1928, he travelled to Buenos Aires, where he helped edit the "Hebrew Stage" and served as a teacher at the Moroccan Jewish community school in the city. He returned the following year to Israel, and was invited to serve as the general secretary of the Sephardi Community Council in Jerusalem, which he held until his death in 1958.

Gaon was one of the activists of the Histadrut HaSephardim (later Sephardim and Oriental Communities) and then in the World Sephardi Federation as a member of the board.

He was known as a Talmid Chakham and a multi-disciplinary, although his main discipline was the study of Oriental Jewry in the land of Israel and in the diaspora. He public many studies which form the basis of the study of the history of the Jews of Spain. His magnum opus is "The Jews of the East in the Land of Israel: Past and Present", in two volumes, which was published in 1928. He also wrote various poems in Ladino and collected many Ladino newspapers, writing a bibliography on the Ladino press. From his inclination to study the newspapers of the orient, he published many bibliographic articles on the subject in collections on the history of the Palestine press, edited by David Yudelwitz and Zalman Pevsner.

== Personal life ==
Gaon married Sarah ben Binyamin Hakim, a native of İzmir. They had 4 children, one daughter: Kalila, and three sons: Yigal, businessmen Benny Gaon and Yehoram Gaon. He died on 8 October 1958 and is buried at Har HaMenuchot.

== Commemoration ==
- He has a street named after him in the Mekor Baruch neighborhood of Northwest Jerusalem
- His son Benny founded the Moshe David Gaon Center for Ladino Culture in his name at Ben-Gurion University of the Negev.
- His personal archive is preserved at the National Library of Israel

== Works ==
- Gaon, Moses David (1928). יהודי המזרח בארץ ישראל - חלק א [Oriental Jews in the Land of Israel: Past and Present] (in Hebrew). Vol. I–II. Jerusalem: Azriel Press.
