= Ezra Danin =

Israeli spy

- עזרא דנין
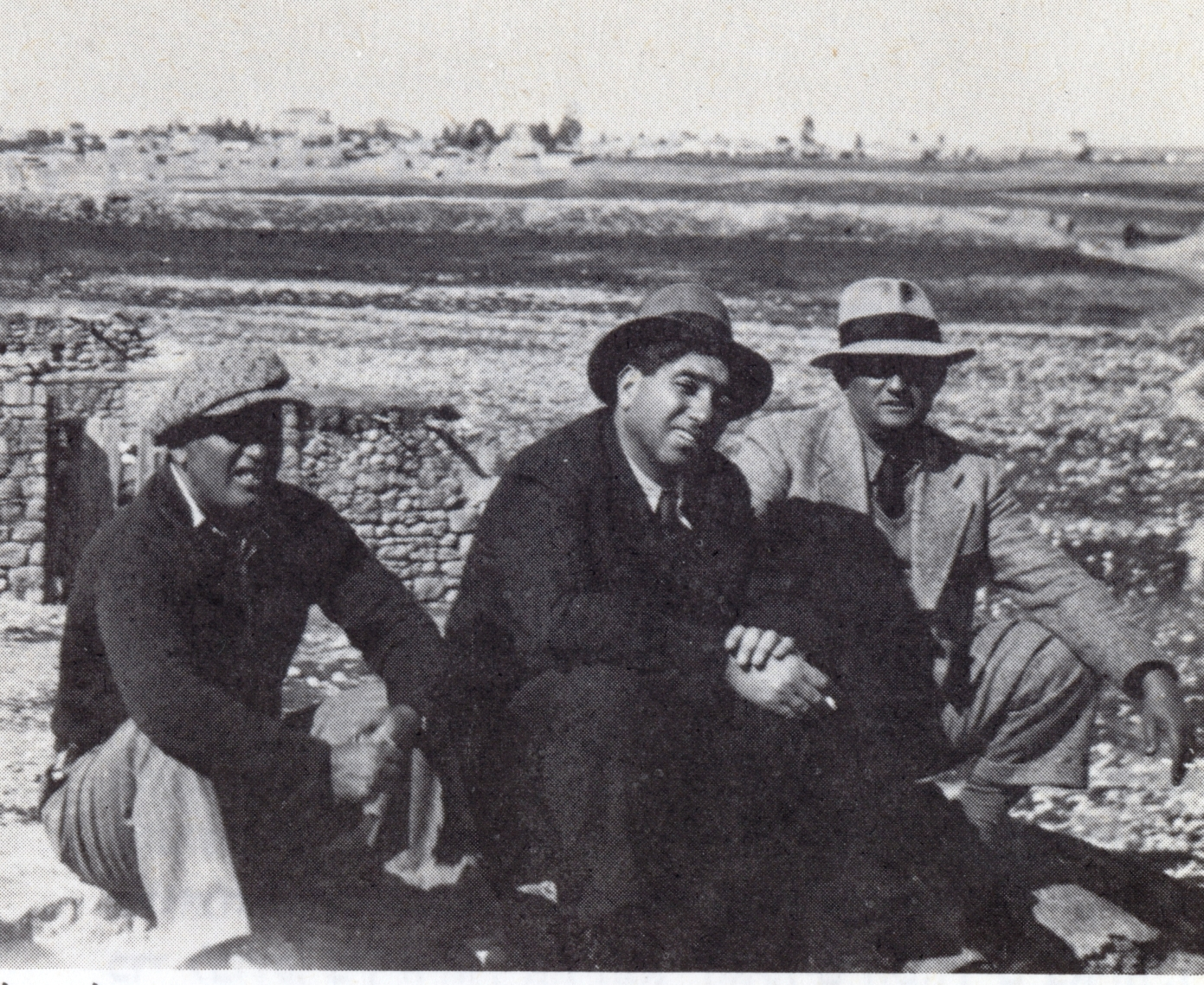
- (pictured in middle)
- Born: August 2, 1903; Jaffa, Ottoman Empire
- Died: May 31, 1984 (aged 80)
- Occupation: Haganah spy

Ezra Danin (Hebrew: עזרא דנין; 2 August 1903- 31 May 1984) was the head of the Arab section of the SHAI, the intelligence arm of the Haganah, Israeli politician and an orange grower. Danin specialized in Arab affairs.

== Biography ==
Danin was born in Jaffa. His father, Yehezkel Danin (originally Socholovsky, 1868–1945), was "an entrepreneur from Białystok (in modern Poland)," and emigrated to Palestine as part of the First Aliyah. Yehezkel became active in Zionist circles and eventually settled in Jaffa, where Ezra was born. He was later one of the founders of Tel Aviv. His mother Rachel Yellin, had been born in Palestine to a family of the Old Yishuv. His maternal grandfather, rabbi Yehoshua Yellin, was a prominent rabbi in Jerusalem, and his maternal grandmother, Sarah Yehuda, was born into an Iraqi-Jewish family originally from Baghdad.^{73}

During the Arab Revolt of 1936-1939, Danin was the leader of a spy network for the Haganah in the district of Samaria. According to Roy Marom, "Fluent in colloquial Arabic from childhood, and versed in Arabic culture and lore, Ezra Danin had no difficulty communicating with Arabs. During the Revolt, Ezra used his family’s extensive connections in order to recruit, train and operate dozens of informants. [...] Danin’s intelligence enabled British troops to locate and expel the rebel commander Fawzi al-Qawuqji from Samaria". In 1940, he formed the Arab section of the SHAI and remained there until 1948. He was instrumental in the formation of the "Syrian Platoon" of the Palmach in 1940–41, whose goal was to infiltrate Syria and Lebanon who were under French Vichy rule.

Danin accompanied Golda Meir, the Jewish Agency representative, in her meetings with King Abdullah of Trans-Jordan, in the months leading to the establishment of the State of Israel. Together with Eliahu Sasson they participated in the 17 November 1947 meeting at Naharayim on the river Jordan. The Danin-Sasson reports were then produced based on this meeting. On May 11, 1948, three days before the proclamation of the independence of Israel Danin again accompanied Meir to Amman, trying to persuade Abdullah not to join the coming Arab-Israeli war of 1948.

According to Nur Masalha and Benny Morris Danin was a member of the various unofficial Transfer Committees, from May to August 1948. According to Roy Marom,

Danin was a prime instigator of the Nakba, the Palestinian Exodus, around Hadera. [...] On 6 April 1948, however, Danin’s committee ordered the evacuation (pinuy) of all Arabs in the Jewish zone of control [...] Danin’s order resulted in the eviction and demolition of all but two Palestinian villages along the country’s coastal plain between Haifa and Jaffa. [...] Israeli authorities appropriated Arab lands, and partitioned them among Jewish settlements. Danin was responsible for allocating Arab properties around Hadera. [...] In the summer of 1948, Danin was a member of the Foreign Ministry committee to formulating a final ‘Settlement of the Arab Refugee Problem’.

Danin then served as a Director of the Foreign Ministry's Middle East Department under Golda Meir.

Danin published two books: a collection of documents captured from Arab gangs in the Arab Revolt of 1936-1939 and an Autobiography titled "Unconditional Zionist" (written with Yaakov Sharet).

== Bibliography ==
- Efraim Karsh (2000) Fabricating Israeli History: The new Historians Routledge ISBN 0-7146-5011-0
- Nur-eldeen Masalha, (1992), Expulsion of the Palestinians: The Concept of 'Transfer' in Zionist Political Thought 1882-1948 Institute for Palestine Studies ISBN 0-88728-235-0
- Benny Morris (2004) Birth of the Palestinian Refugee Problem Revisited, Cambridge University Press, ISBN 0-521-00967-7
- Ilan Pappé (2006) The Ethnic Cleansing of Palestine Oneworld publications ISBN 978-1-85168-467-0
- Selwyn Ilan Troen, Noah Lucas (1995) Israel: The First Decade of Independence SUNY Press ISBN 0-7914-2259-3
- Avi Shlaim (1988 reprinted 2004) The Politics of Partition; King Abdullah, The Zionists, and Palestine 1921-1951 Oxford University Press ISBN 0-19-829459-X
