= Motza Illit =

Motza Illit: מוצא עילית (Hebrew)
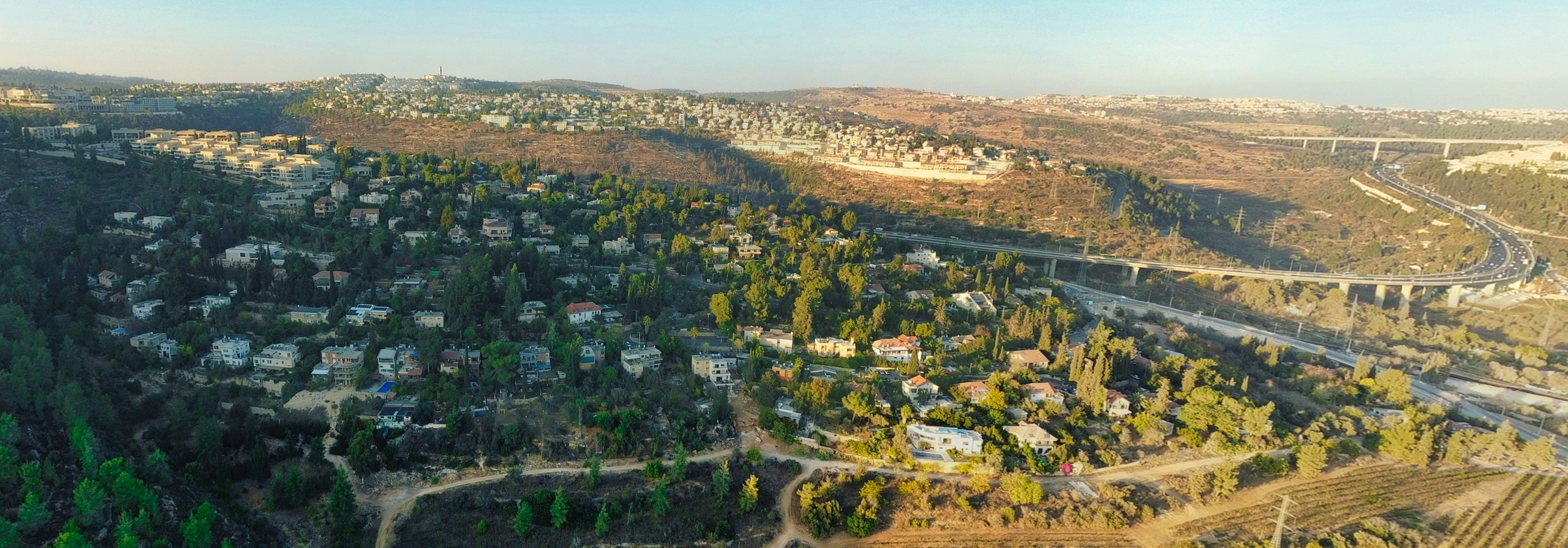

- Location within Jerusalem District Location within Israel
- Coordinates: 31°47′35″N 35°9′28″E
- Country: Israel
- District: Jerusalem
- Council: Mateh Yehuda
- Founded: 1933
- Founder: Motza residents
- Population (2024): 1,661

Motza Illit (Hebrew: מוֹצָא עִלִּית, מוצא עילית, lit. 'Upper Motza') is a community settlement in central Israel, near Mevasert Zion to the west of Jerusalem. Located on a slope overlooking the Jerusalem Mountains, Ein Karem, the Motza Valley and Jerusalem, it falls under the jurisdiction of Mateh Yehuda Regional Council. In 2024 it had a population of 1,661.

== History ==
Settlement in the area goes back to ancient prehistoric times, with thousands of year old terraces and archaeological remains in the area. In 1929, old Motza was attacked by Arab rioters and some residents were murdered. Four years later in 1933 a new moshav, Motza Ilit, was established at a higher location on the same slope.

In January 1934 a house-warming party was held by twenty Jewish families who had built homes in Motza Illit with the aid of the Jewish National Council ("Va'ad Leumi") and emergency funds.

Motza Illit overlooks the Judaean Mountains, the churches and monasteries of Ein Karem, the Beit Zayit water reservoir and the Jerusalem Forest.

Motza Illit has three secular kindergartens. Elementary school children study at the Ein Harim Elementary School near the Beit Zayit water reservoir. For secondary school, Motza Illit's children study at a range of local secondary schools (Ein Karem Secondary School) and in Jerusalem (such as The University Secondary School, Boyer, Science and Arts Secondary School, Academy for Music and Dance and more).

== Notable residents ==
- David Kaminsky (born 1938), basketball player and coach
- Anna Ticho

== Gallery ==
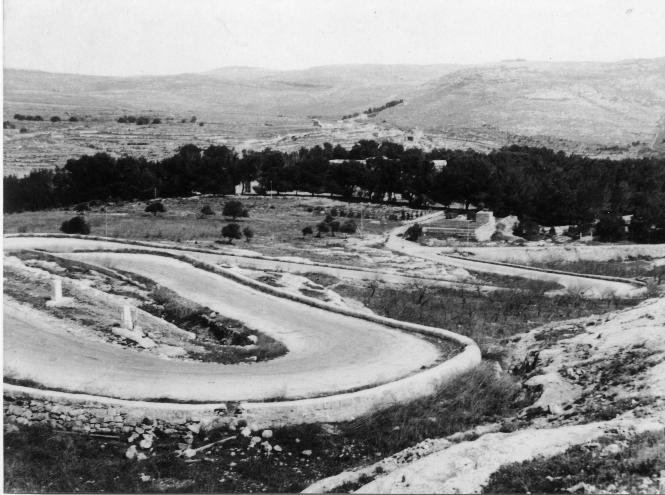
Seven Sisters Road in 1948

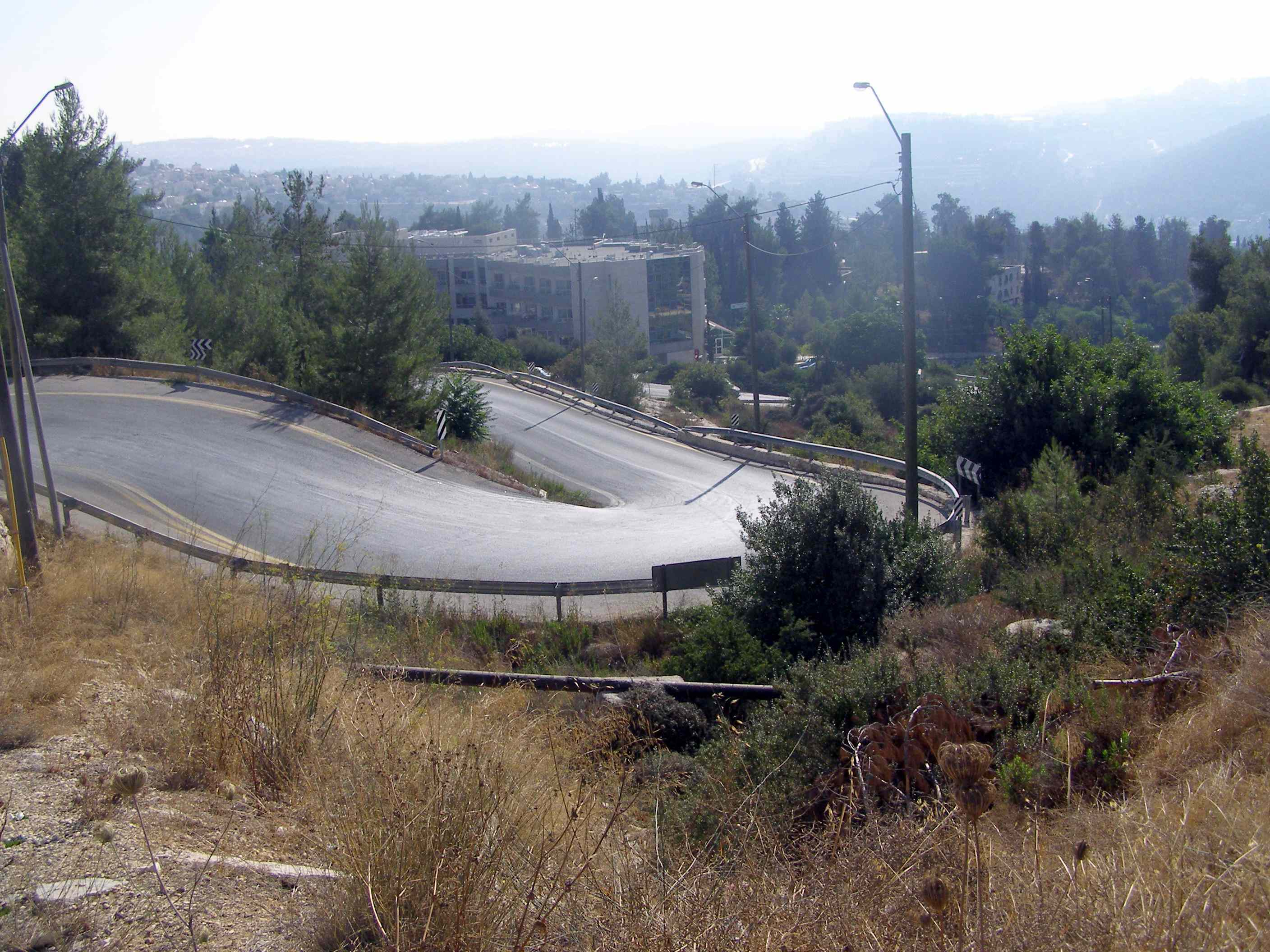
Seven Sisters Road to Motza Illit in 2010

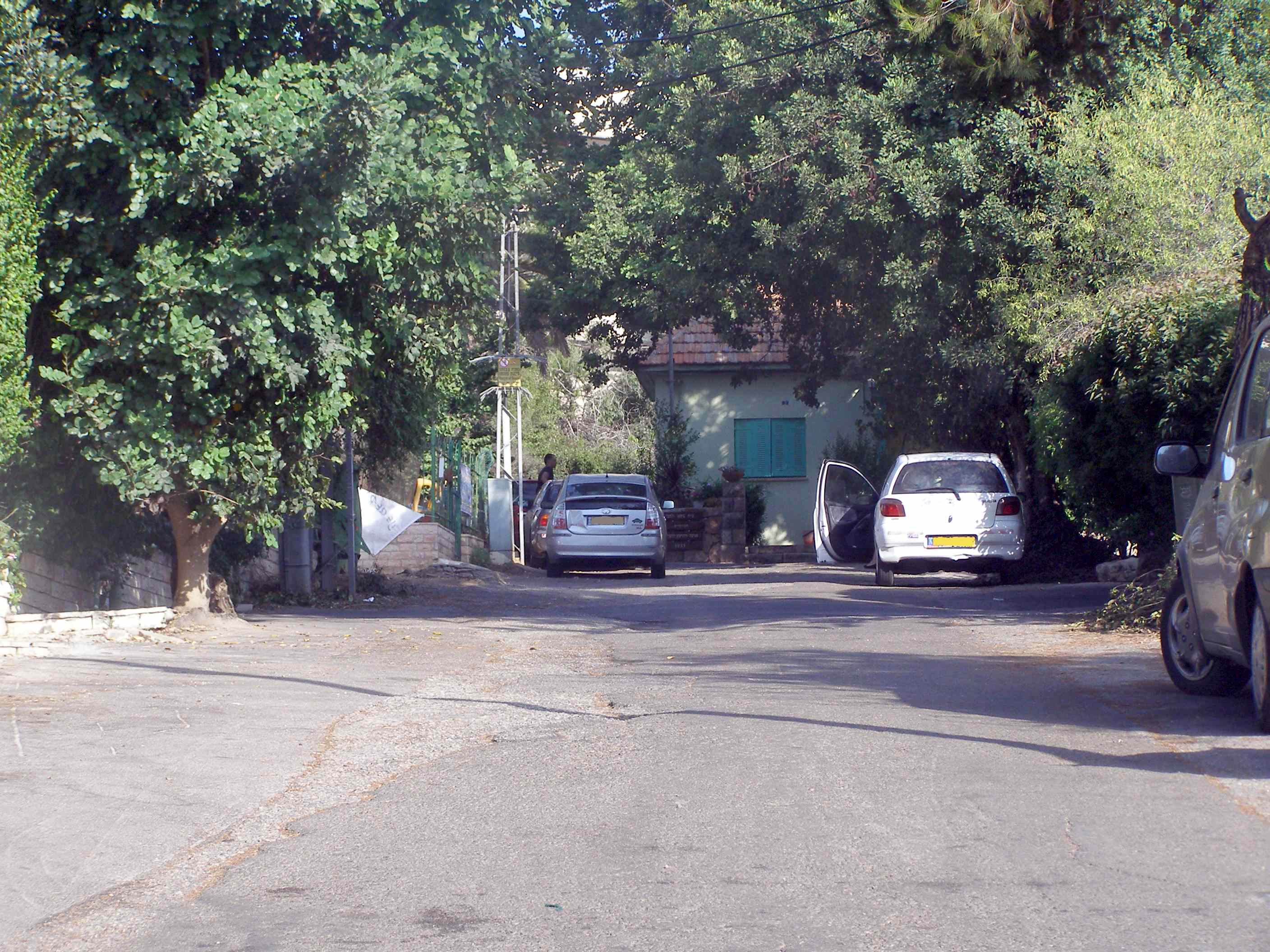
Street in Motza Illit
