= Qalunya =

Qalunya قالونيا Qaluniya, Colonia, Kolonia, Kulόnieh
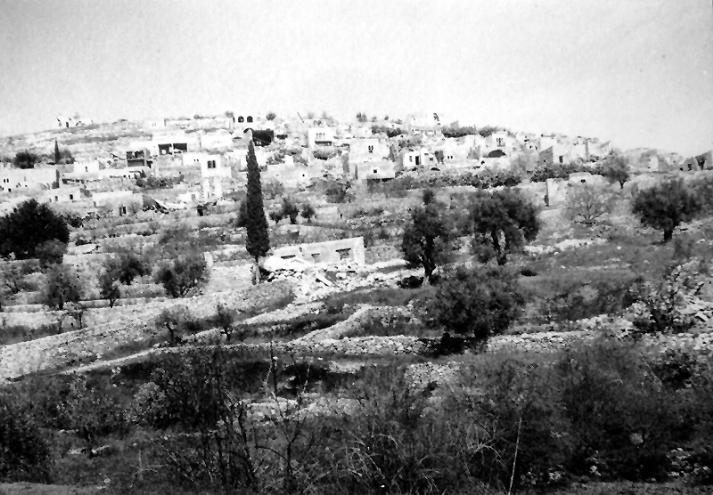
- Qalunya, before 1949
- Etymology: from the Latin Colonia
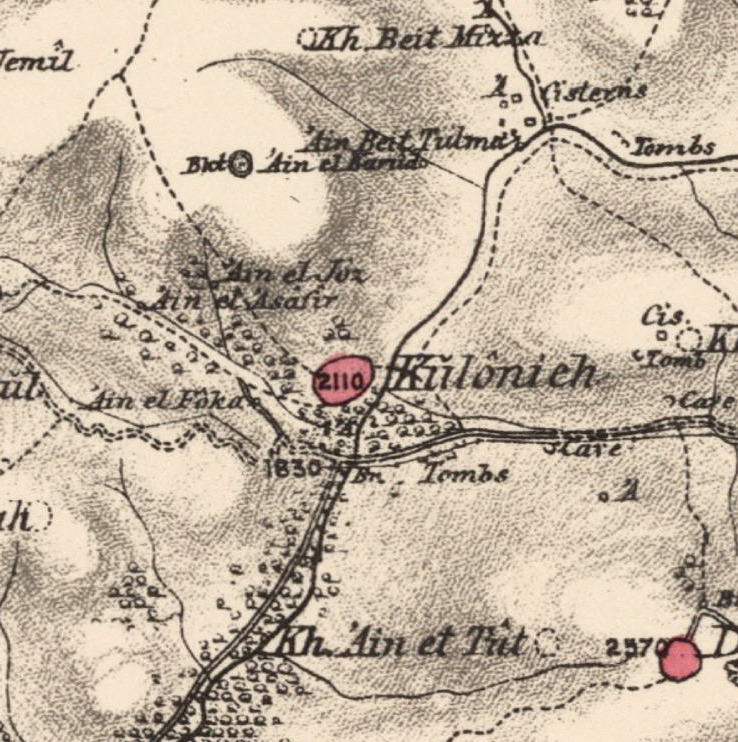
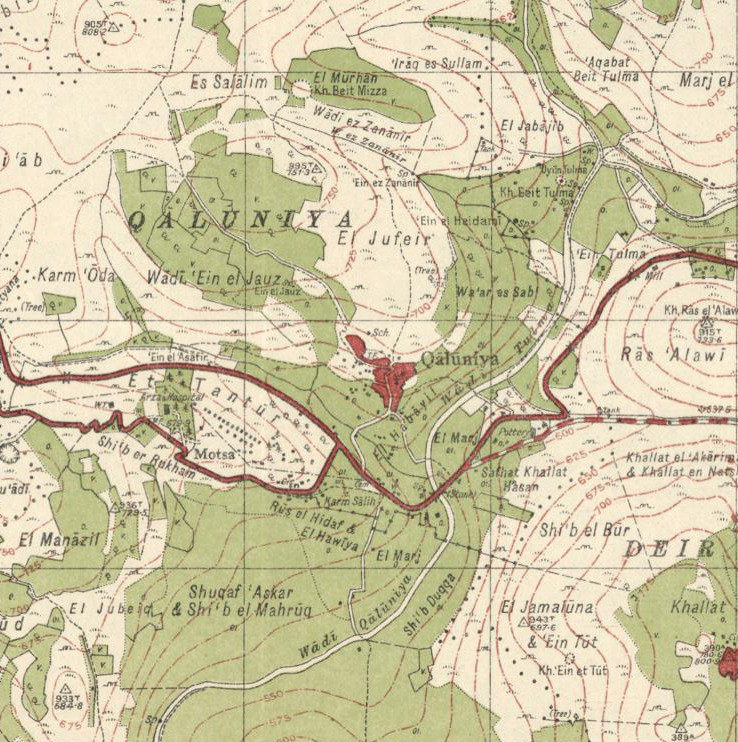
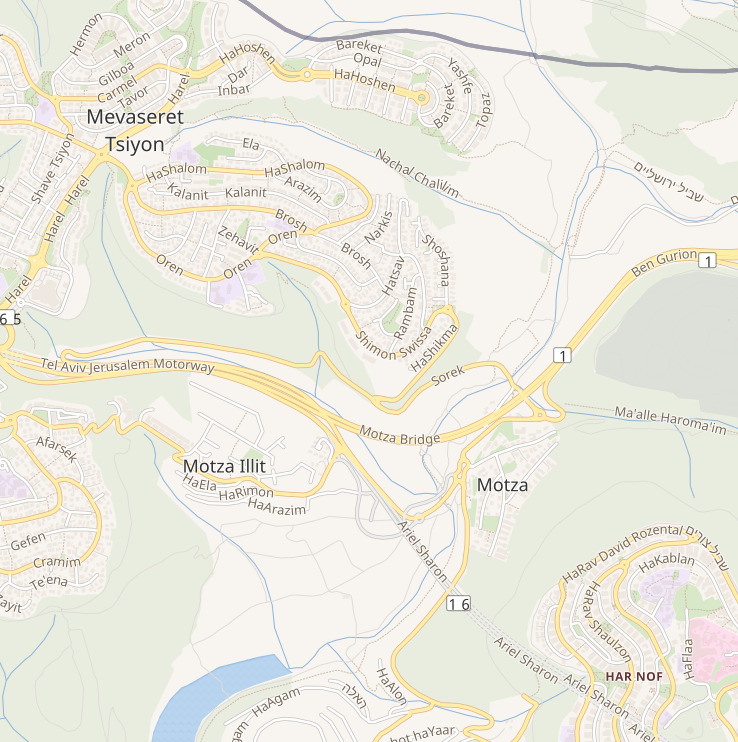
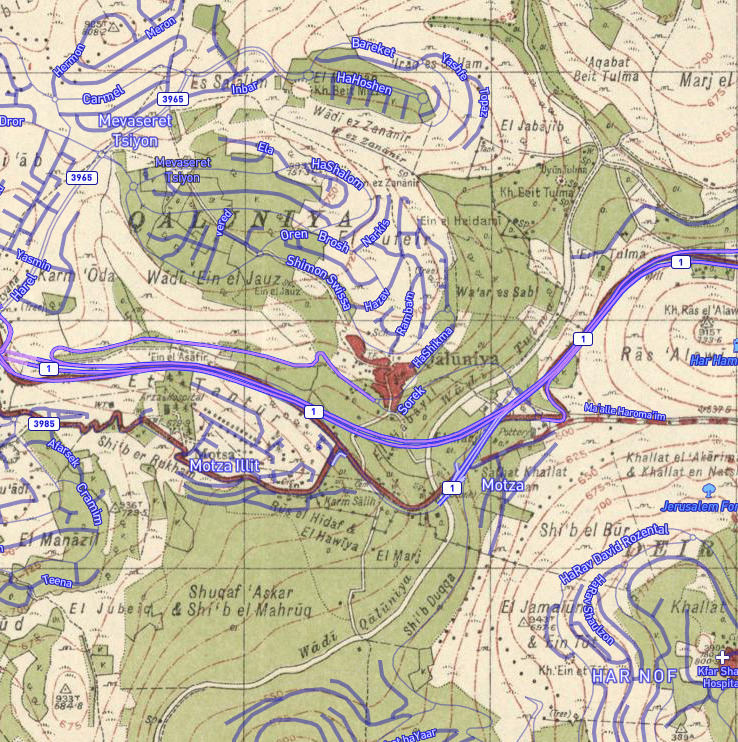
- 1870s map 1940s map modern map 1940s with modern overlay map A series of historical maps of the area around Qalunya (click the buttons)

- Location within Mandatory Palestine
- Coordinates: 31°47′49″N 35°9′46″E
- Palestine grid: 165/133
- Geopolitical entity: Mandatory Palestine
- Subdistrict: Jerusalem
- Date of depopulation: early April, 1948,

Area
  - Total: 4,844 dunams (4.844 km^{2}; 1.870 sq mi)

Population (1945)
  - Total: 900
- Cause(s) of depopulation: Military assault by Yishuv forces
- Current Localities: Mevaseret Zion

Qalunya (Arabic: قالونيا, also transliterated Qaluniya) was a Palestinian village located 6 kilometers (3.7 mi) west of Jerusalem. Prior to the village's destruction in 1948, with the exception of 166 dunams, Qalunya's land was privately owned: 3,594 dunams were owned by Arabs, while 1,084 dunams were owned by Jews.

== Location ==
Qalunya stood on a mountain slope, facing southwest; Wadi Qalunya passed through its eastern edge. The village lay on the Jerusalem-Jaffa highway, and a dirt path linked it to its neighboring villages. Qalunya was located where the Israelite and Jewish town of Motza was believed to have been. The Modern Motza is now an outlying neighborhood of Jerusalem, and ruins of demolished buildings from Qalunya are present near Motza, covered in vegetation, just off the main highway between Jerusalem and Tel Aviv. The town of Mevaseret Zion today is expanding upon some of the territory of former Qalunya.

== History ==
=== Roman and Byzantine periods ===
Qalunya preserves the name of Colonia Amosa or Colonia Emmaus, a Roman colony established at the site of the Jewish village of Motza, which was destroyed during the First Jewish–Roman War. After 71 CE, Emperor Vespasian settled 800 Roman soldiers in the town, as part of a post-war policy of land confiscation and veteran settlement, which aimed to reward soldiers and establish a loyal population in the province. The settlers came from throughout the Roman Empire, and "might have been, at least partially, of non-Semitic" origins.

The word colonia produced the Byzantine-period Greek name, Koloneia, for the site. The status of the site in the early Islamic period has not been established, but the name was preserved in Crusader times as Qalonie or Qalunia and in Arabic as Qalunya. Mujir al-Din al-Hanbali reported that in 1192 it was a village near Jerusalem.

==== New Testament ====
It has also been suggested that Qalunya was Emmaus of the New Testament. The site is at more or less the correct distance from Jerusalem to match the story told in the Gospel of Luke (Luke 24:13–35). The village where Vespasian settled the 800 veterans was known as Emmaus at that time. The new military colony completely eclipsed the title town and its name was lost to history. During the Byzantine period the name Emmaus was not in use, so the Byzantine Christians did not know of it. The tradition of Emmaus was attached to Emmaus-Nicopolis instead. Excavations in 2001-2003 headed by Professor Carsten Peter Thiede let him conclude that Khirbet Mizza/Tel Moza was the only credible candidate for biblical Emmaus.

=== Ottoman period ===
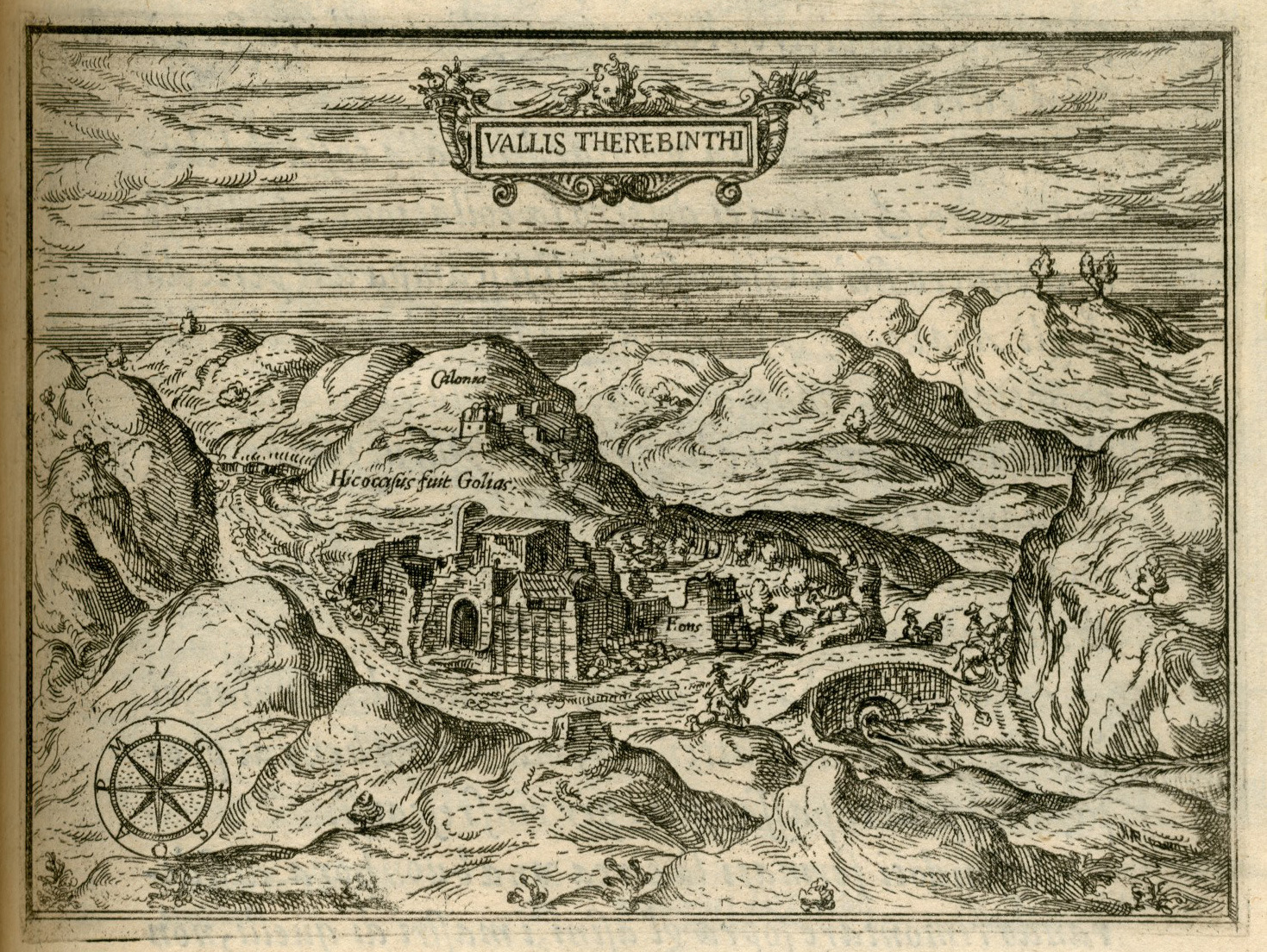
Qalunya noted on 1587 print by Jean Zuallart

In the 1596 tax registers, Qalunya was a village in the Ottoman Empire, nahiya (subdistrict) of Jerusalem under the liwa' (district) of Jerusalem, and it had a population of 19 Muslim households, an estimated 110 persons. The villagers paid a fixed tax rate of 33,3% on a number of crops, including wheat, barley and olives, as well as on goats, beehives and molasses; a total of 6,450 akçe. All of the revenue went to Waqf.

In 1838, Kulonieh was noted as a Muslim village in the Beni Malik district, west of Jerusalem.

In 1863 Victor Guérin found it to be a village of 500 inhabitants, while an Ottoman village list from about 1870 found that Kalonije had a population of 120, in 43 houses, though the population count included men, only.

In 1883, the PEF's Survey of Western Palestine (SWP) described Qalunya as being a moderate-sized village perched on the slope of a hill, 300 feet (91 m) above a valley. Travelers reported that it had a "modern" restaurant. The villagers tended orange and lemon trees that were planted around a spring in the valley. To the west of the restaurant were ruins, possible of Byzantine origin.

In the 1890s, Jews purchased some of Qalunya's farmlands, and established the village of Motza, the first Jewish settlement outside Jerusalem.

In 1896 the population of Kalonije was estimated to be about 312 persons.

=== British Mandate ===
In the 1922 census of Palestine, conducted by the British Mandate authorities, Qalunieh (Qalonia) had a population 549; 456 Muslims, 88 Jews and 5 Orthodox Christians, increasing in the 1931 census to 632, 632 Muslims and 10 Christians; in a total of 156 houses.

During the 1929 Palestine riots an nearby house belonging to the Makleff family was attacked, and the father, mother, son, two daughters, and their two guests were killed. Twelve residents of Qalunya were charged with the murders, but the judge found them not guilty on account of contradictions in the Jewish evidence. The defense claimed that the murders were done by Bedouin, which the judge called "pure invention".

In the 1945 statistics, Qalunya had a population of 900 Muslims and 10 Christians, while Motza had a population of 350 Jews. The total land area was 4,844 dunams. A total of 1,224 dunums of land were irrigated or used for plantations, 955 were used for cereals; while 227 dunams were classified as built-up areas.

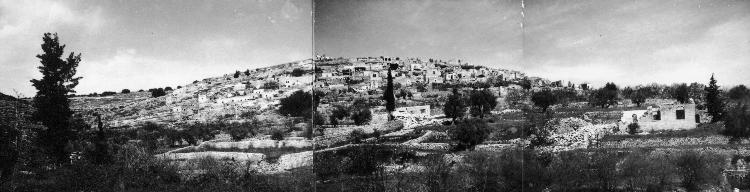
Qalunya panorama 10 April 1948

=== 1948, and after ===
Qalunya was situated just east of the battlefield of Castel and part of the Arab siege on Jerusalem. As a result on 11 April 1948, as part of Operation Nachshon, Hagana forces entered the village and blew up 50 houses - after "the inhabitants had been evacuated." According to Ilan Pappe, Qalunya was one of four villages that were systematically destroyed by Hagana units in this fashion in the immediate wake of the Deir Yassin massacre; the others being, Beit Surik, Biddu and Saris.

=== Archaeology ===
According to the Israel Antiquities Authority (IAA), the earliest archaeological finds of Qaluniya date back to the Early Bronze Age, Early Bronze Age I, Iron Age II, followed by artefacts retrieved from the Hellenistic-Roman, Byzantine, Early Islamic, and Crusade period. The remains of a Byzantine Church were discovered on the site.

In 2012 Israeli archaeologists discovered the Tel Motza temple, an Israelite cultic building dating to the monarchic period (Iron Age IIA).

== Bibliography ==
- Barron, J. B., ed. (1923). Palestine: Report and General Abstracts of the Census of 1922. Government of Palestine.
- Conder, C.R.; Kitchener, H.H. (1883). The Survey of Western Palestine: Memoirs of the Topography, Orography, Hydrography, and Archaeology. Vol. 3. London: Committee of the Palestine Exploration Fund.
- Danby, H., ed. (1933), The Mishnah, Oxford: Oxford University Press, ISBN 0-19-815402-X
- Department of Statistics (1945). Village Statistics, April, 1945. Government of Palestine.
- Finkelstein, I.; Gadot, Yuval (2015), "Mozah, Nephtoah and royal estates in the Jerusalem highlands", Semitica et Classica. International Journal of Oriental and Mediterranean Studies, vol. VIII, Belgium: Brepols Publishers, pp. 227–228, ISBN 9782503547008, ISSN 2031-5937, OCLC 1101993202
- Guérin, V. (1868). Description Géographique Historique et Archéologique de la Palestine, Part I: Judee (in French). Vol. 1. Paris: L'Imprimerie Nationale.
- Hadawi, S. (1970). Village Statistics of 1945: A Classification of Land and Area ownership in Palestine. Palestine Liberation Organization Research Center.
- Hartmann, M. (1883). "Die Ortschaftenliste des Liwa Jerusalem in dem türkischen Staatskalender für Syrien auf das Jahr 1288 der Flucht (1871)". Zeitschrift des Deutschen Palästina-Vereins. 6: 102–149.
- Hütteroth, W.-D.; Abdulfattah, K. (1977). Historical Geography of Palestine, Transjordan and Southern Syria in the Late 16th Century. Erlanger Geographische Arbeiten, Sonderband 5. Erlangen, Germany: Vorstand der Fränkischen Geographischen Gesellschaft. ISBN 3-920405-41-2.
- Khalidi, W. (1992). All That Remains: The Palestinian Villages Occupied and Depopulated by Israel in 1948. Washington D.C.: Institute for Palestine Studies. ISBN 0-88728-224-5.
- Mills, E., ed. (1932). Census of Palestine 1931. Population of Villages, Towns and Administrative Areas. Jerusalem: Government of Palestine.
- Morris, B. (2004). The Birth of the Palestinian Refugee Problem Revisited. Cambridge University Press. ISBN 978-0-521-00967-6.
- Murphy-O'Connor, J. (2008). The Holy Land: An Oxford Archaeological Guide from Earliest Times to 1700 (5th ed.). Oxford, UK: Oxford University Press. ISBN 978-0-19-923666-4.
- Palmer, E. H. (1881). The Survey of Western Palestine: Arabic and English Name Lists Collected During the Survey by Lieutenants Conder and Kitchener, R. E. Transliterated and Explained by E.H. Palmer. Committee of the Palestine Exploration Fund.
- Pappé, I. (2006). The Ethnic Cleansing of Palestine (Paperback 2008 ed.). Oneworld Publications Limited. ISBN 978-1-85168-555-4.
- Pococke, R. (1745). A description of the East, and some other countries. Vol. 2. London: Printed for the author, by W. Bowyer. (p. 47)
- Robinson, E.; Smith, E. (1841). Biblical Researches in Palestine, Mount Sinai and Arabia Petraea: A Journal of Travels in the year 1838. Vol. 2. Boston: Crocker & Brewster.
- Robinson, E.; Smith, E. (1841). Biblical Researches in Palestine, Mount Sinai and Arabia Petraea: A Journal of Travels in the year 1838. Vol. 3. Boston: Crocker & Brewster.
- Schick, C. (1896). "Zur Einwohnerzahl des Bezirks Jerusalem". Zeitschrift des Deutschen Palästina-Vereins. 19: 120–127.
- Segev, T. (2013). One Palestine, Complete. Macmillan. ISBN 978-1466843509.
- Socin, A. (1879). "Alphabetisches Verzeichniss von Ortschaften des Paschalik Jerusalem". Zeitschrift des Deutschen Palästina-Vereins. 2: 135–163.
- Wheaton, Gerry (2015). The Role of Jewish Feasts in John's Gospel. Cambridge University Press. ISBN 9781316299753.
- Zuallart, J. [in French] (1587). Il devotissimo viaggio di Gervsalemme. Roma: Stampato in Roma : Per F. Zanetti & Gia. Ruffinelli.
