= Tel Motza =

Archaeological site near Jerusalem, Israel

- Interactive map of Tel Motza
- 31°47′40″N 35°9′50″E
- Type: settlement

Tel Motza or Tel Moẓa is an archaeological site in Motza on the outskirts of Jerusalem, Israel. It includes the remains of a large Neolithic settlement dated to around 8600–8200 BCE, and Iron Age Israelite settlement dating to around 1000 to 500 BCE and identified with the biblical Mozah mentioned in the Book of Joshua. In 2012, Israeli archaeologists announced the discovery of a temple from the Iron Age IIA levels at Motza, contemporary with the First Temple in Jerusalem.

== Neolithic ==
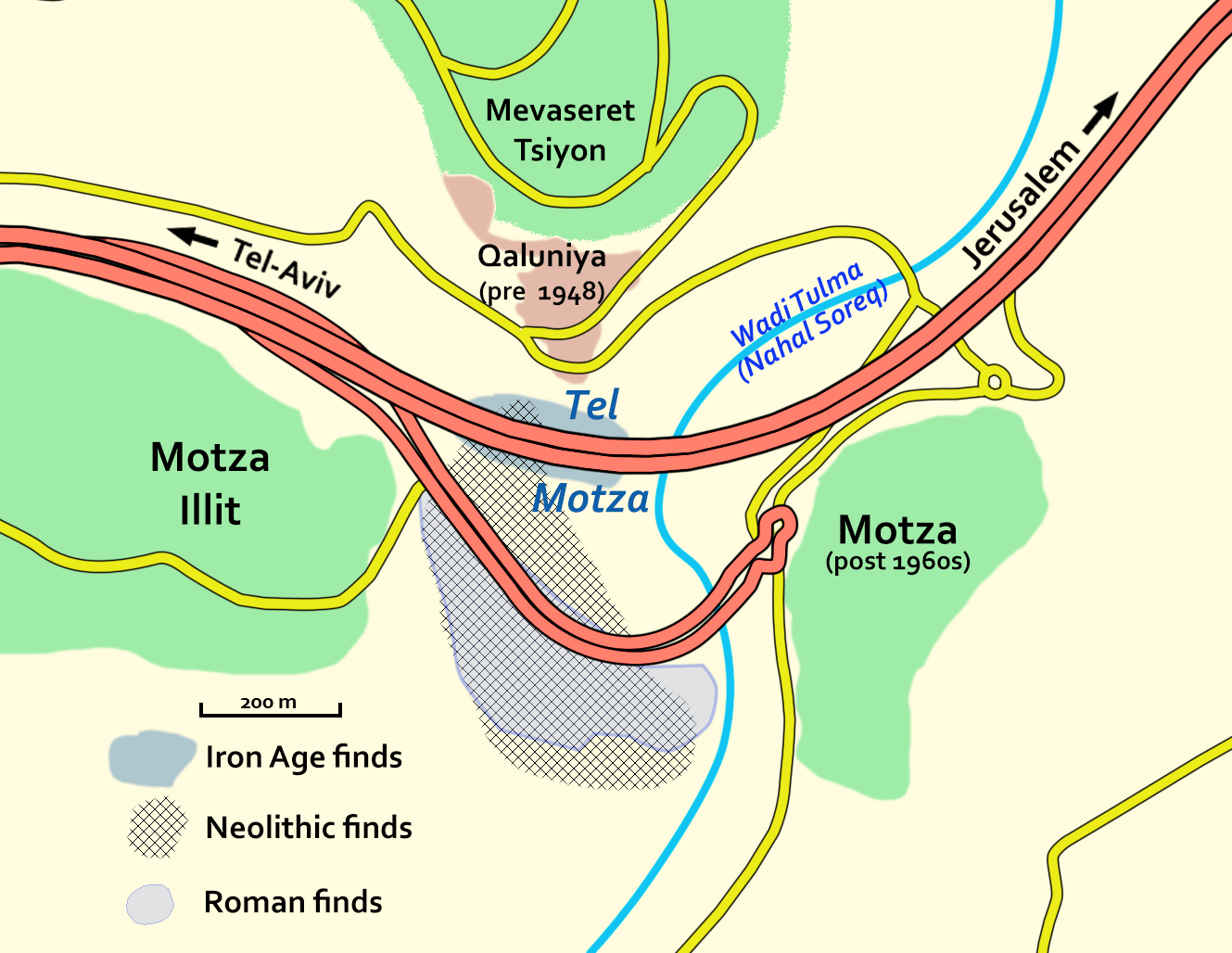
Archaeological sites in the Motza region of Israel

A 9,000-year-old Neolithic site was discovered at Motza.

Archaeologists found at Tel Motza remains of a settlement dated to the Neolithic period (about 6000 BCE), indicating that Motza was part of an ancient economic center. The site was called "Big Bang" of Prehistory because of the preservation of the artefacts and the size of its area. It has been discovered that the area was home to about 3,000 residents. This Neolithic settlement is considered the largest ever discovered in Israel, and changed the beliefs about this area being uninhabited during that period. "This is most probably the largest excavation of this time period in the Middle East, which will allow the research to advance leaps and bounds ahead of where we are today, just by the amount of material that we are able to save and preserve from this site", reported archaeologist Lauren Davis from the IAA.

Excavations at Tel Motza took place in 2012–13 and 2019. The area was excavated by the Israel Antiquities Authority (IAA) because of the highway construction, and the researches are conducted by IAA archaeologists Hamoudi Khalaily and Jacob Vardi.

Flint tools (arrowheads, axes, blades and knives), figurine of an ox made of clay, a stone-carved human face, seeds, stone bracelets, animal bones and other objects have been found from the site. According to the archaeologists, "Amongst others, unique stone-made objects were found in the tombs, made of an unknown type of stone, as well as items made of obsidian (volcanic glass) from Anatolia, and sea-shells, some of which were brought from the Mediterranean Sea and some from the Red Sea."

== Tel Motza: Iron Age temple ==
Excavations in Motza (2012) unearthed the Tel Motza temple, a large building revealing clear elements of ritual use, dated to the 9th century BCE. A rare cache of ritual objects found near the building included tiny ceramic figurines of men and animals. An analysis of animal bones found at the site indicated that they belonged only to kosher animals. Excavations at the site continued as late as 2013, led by archaeologists Shua Kisilevitz, Zvi Greenhut, and Anna Eirikh-Rose on behalf of the Israel Antiquities Authority (IAA). Some finds, such as the possible presence of a Canaanite storm god, have been interpreted as further evidence that First Temple-era Judahite religion ("Yahwism") was markedly different from the monotheistic Judaism depicted much later in the Bible.

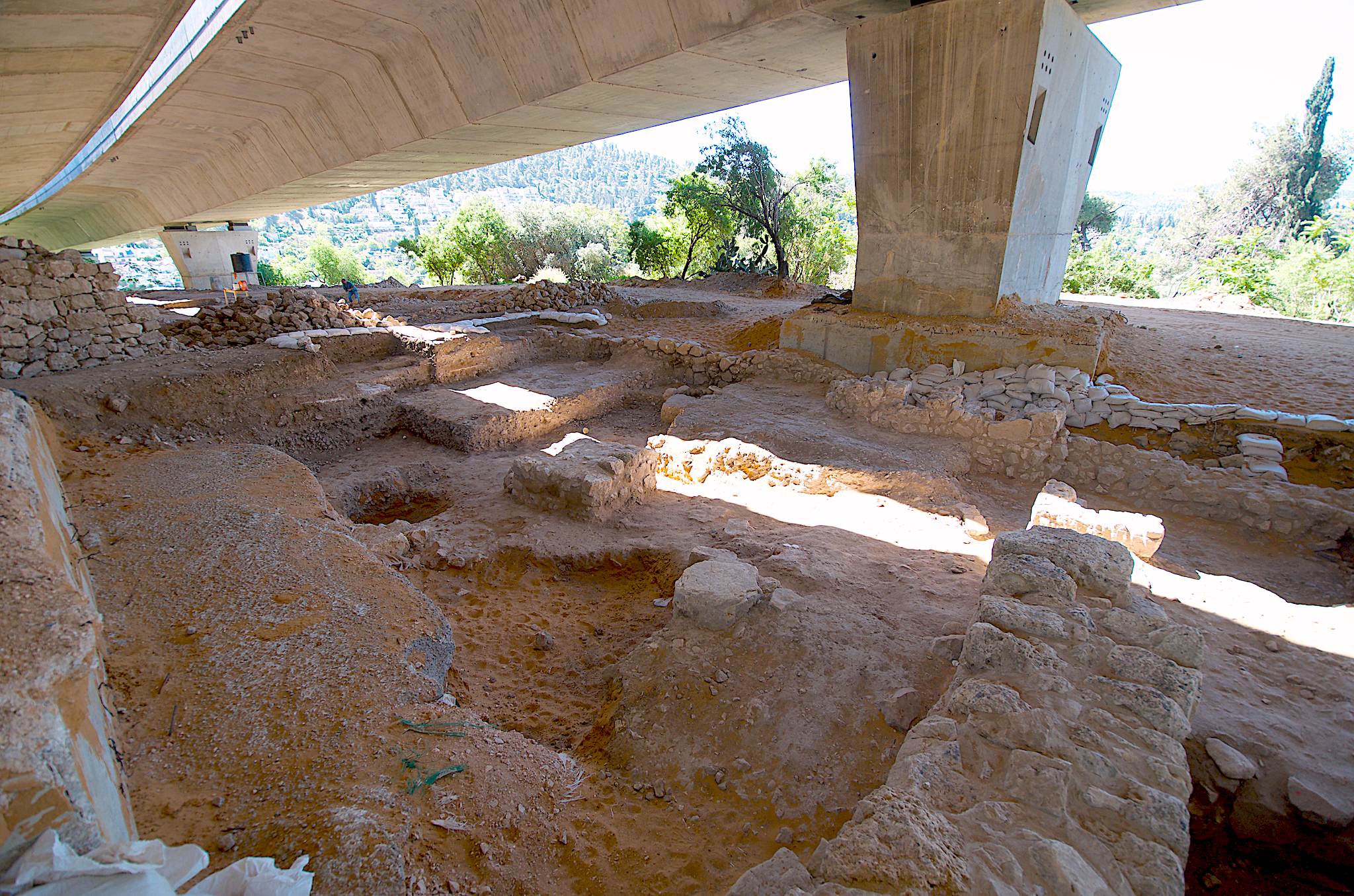
The Israelite temple at Tel Motza

Excavations at Tel Motza carried out prior to construction on Highway 1 (Israel–Palestine) revealed a public building, storehouses and silos dating to the days of the monarchic period (Iron Age IIA). A wide, east-facing entrance in the wall of the public building is believed to have been built in accordance with temple construction traditions in the ancient Near East: the rising sun would illuminate an object placed inside the temple, symbolizing the divine presence.

An array of sacred pottery vessels, chalices, and small figurines of men and horses were found near the altar of the temple. The cache of sacred vessels has been dated to the early 9th century BCE, that is before the centralizing religious reforms of Kings Hezekiah (reign ca. 729–687 BCE) and Josiah (reign ca. 640–609 BCE) of Judah.

The temple dates back to the Kingdom of Judah of the 9th century BCE, and appears to have operated alongside the First Temple in nearby Jerusalem. Jerusalem was the centre of the Kingdom of Judah and, according to the Hebrew Bible, the seat of kings David and Solomon. Many historical finds have been discovered in the area of Tel Motza, dating from different periods, and archaeologists have sought to identify it as the Biblical settlement Moṣa mentioned in Joshua 18: 26.

The archaeological site directors said the discoveries provided evidence of temples and ritual enclosures throughout the Kingdom of Judah before the religious reforms centralized ritual practices at the Temple in Jerusalem. The temple was a rare find of remains from the First Temple period.

Animal bones were found at the site, and show signs of having been cut, possibly indicating that they were sacrificed.

=== Neolithic findings in temple area ===
Occupation earth with one of the first remains of buildings, statuettes and bones of domesticated animals in the temple's area and nearby goes back to about 7,000 BC. This older part was to be buried by Highway 16 in 2019 after development-led excavation.

In 2026, the earliest known use of dolomitic lime plaster within a settlement constituted by more than 20 building complexes dating from 7100 to 6700 b.c

== See also ==
- Archaeology of Israel
- City of David (archaeological site)
- 'En Esur , Chalcolithic-period settlement of comparable size to Neolithic Motza
- Tabernacle
- Temple Mount
