= Motza =

Neighbourhood of West Jerusalem

Coordinates: 31°47′38″N 35°10′6″E

Motza Hebrew: מוצא
- Neighborhood of Jerusalem
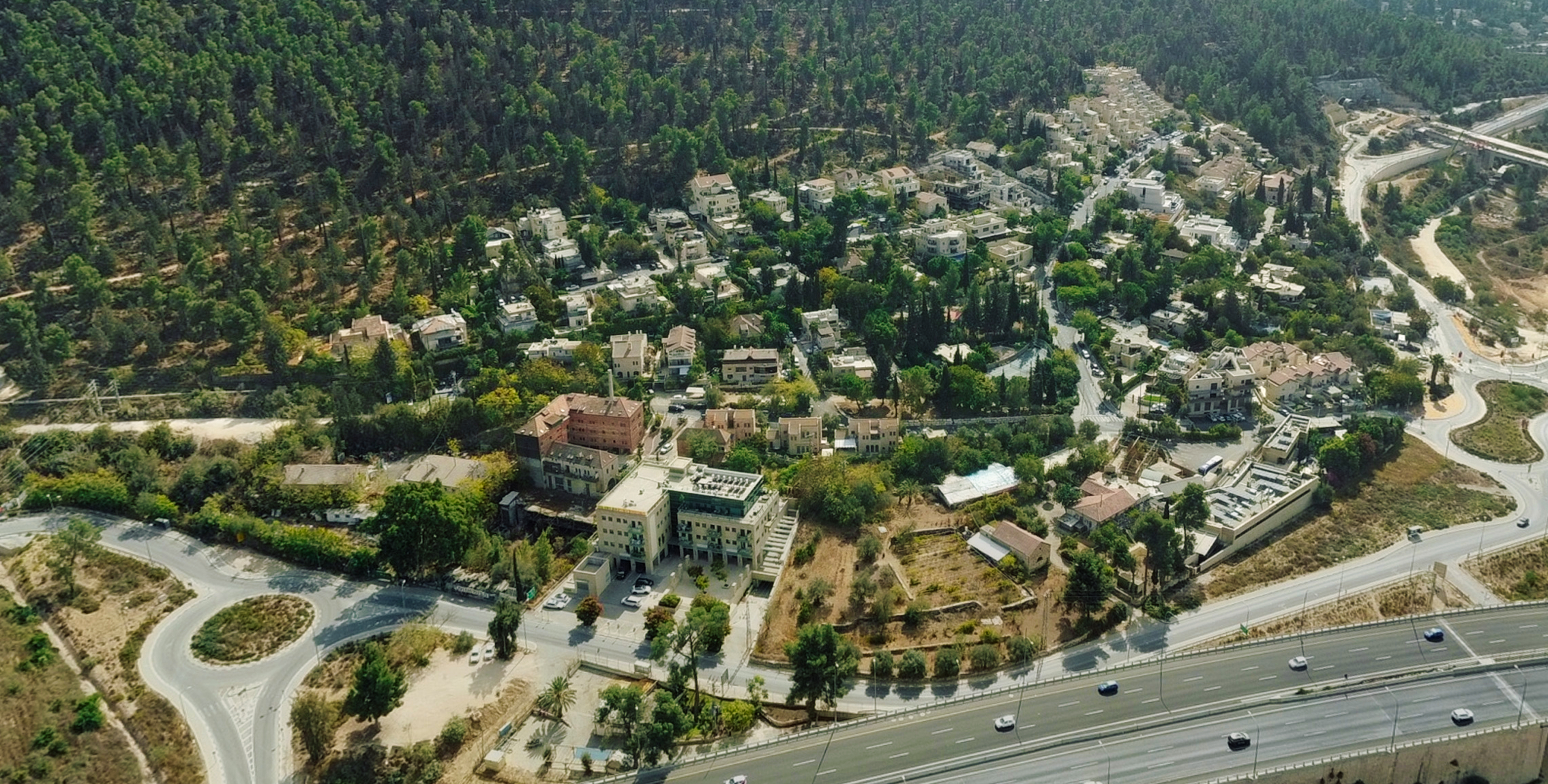
- Aerial view of Motsa, 2021
- Interactive map of Motza
- Country: Israel
- District: Jerusalem District
- City: Jerusalem

Motza, also Mozah or Motsa, (Hebrew: מוֹצָא, Arabic: موتسا), is a neighbourhood on the western edge of Jerusalem. It is located in the Judaean Mountains, 600 metres (2,000 ft) above sea level, connected to Jerusalem by the Jerusalem–Tel Aviv highway, Highway 16, and the winding mountain road to Har Nof.

Established in 1854, Motza was the first Jewish farm founded outside the walls of the Old City in the modern era.

It is situated near Tel Motza, an archaeological site and the location of the Biblical village of the same name mentioned in Joshua 18:26.

== History ==
=== Tel Motza ===
Motza is the site of the Canaanite and later Israelite town of Mozah, which, according to the Hebrew Bible, was allotted by Joshua to the Tribe of Benjamin (Joshua 18:26). The name Mozah was found stamped on pottery handles in Tell en-Nasbeh, a site identified with the biblical city of Mizpah, also in the territory of Benjamin.

Sherds from the Late Bronze Age (only one), Iron Age II (58%), Persian/Hellenistic (16%), and Early Islamic period (16%) have been found; 7% were unidentified.

In 2012, Israeli archaeologists discovered an Israelite cultic building at Tel Motza, dating to the monarchic period (Iron Age IIA).

=== Second Temple period ===
During the Second Temple period, Motza was the place whence willow branches were cut down for the abundance of willows that grew in the valley, along the riverine brook, and brought to the Temple for ceremonial worship.

Biblical Mozah is listed among the Benjamite cities of Joshua 18:26. It was referred to in the Talmud as a place where people would come to cut young willow branches as a part of the celebration of Sukkot (Mishnah, Sukkah 4.5: 178).

==== Emmaus of the Gospels ====
Excavations in 2001–2003, led by Carsten Peter Thiede let him to conclude that Tel Motza was the site of Emmaus of the New Testament.

=== Roman Colonia Amosa; Muslim Qalunya ===
After the demise of the Jewish polity in Jerusalem following the First Jewish–Roman War, Vespasian settled 800 Roman soldiers in the town, which became a Roman settlement known as Colonia Amosa. Following the Muslim conquest of the Levant, it became known as Qalunya.

=== Jewish settlement under Ottoman rule, 1854-WWI ===
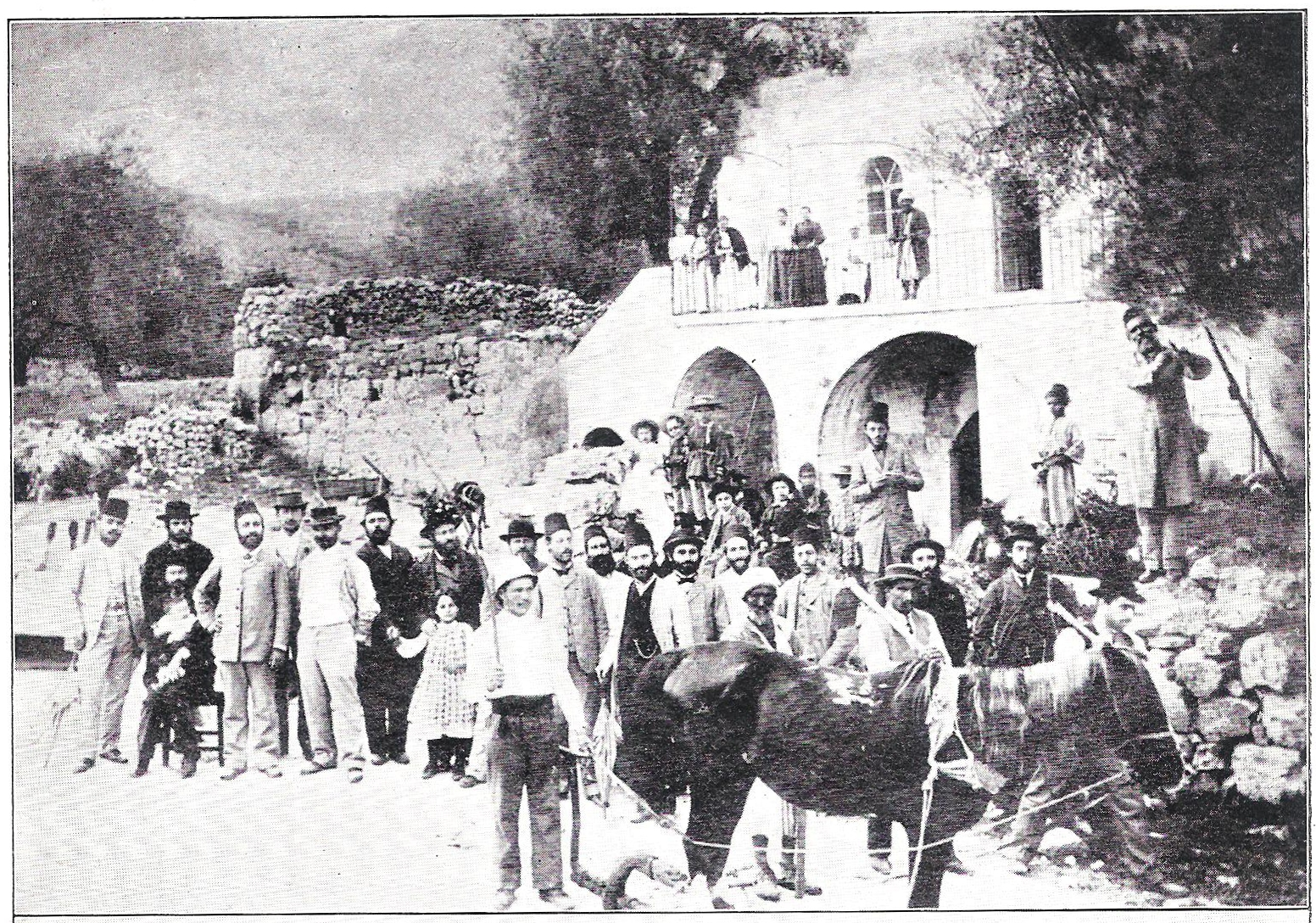
Residents of Motza before 1899

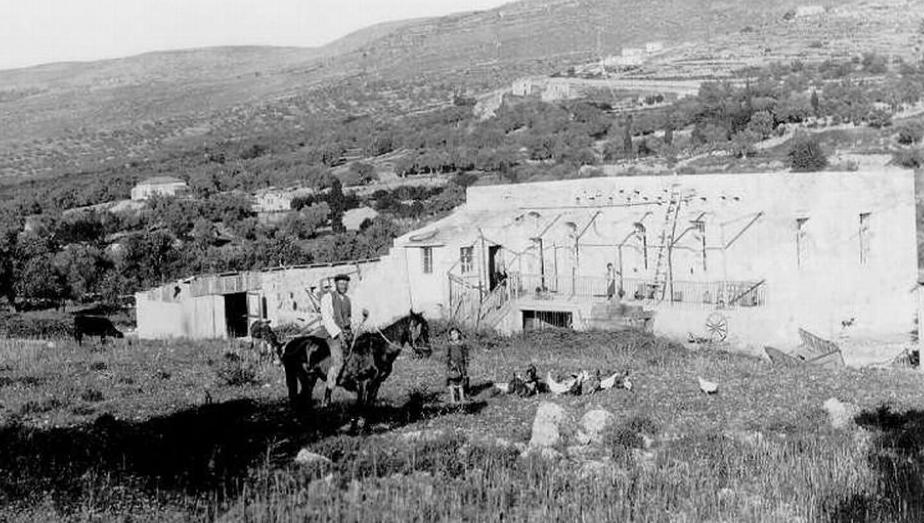
Motza farmstead, 1912

In 1854, farmland was purchased from the nearby Arab village of Qalunya (Colonia) by a Baghdadi Jew, Shaul Yehuda, with the aid of British consul James Finn. A B'nai B'rith official signed a contract with the residents of Motza residents that enabled them to pay for the land in long-term payments. Four Jewish families settled there.

In 1871, while plowing his fields, one of the residents, Yehoshua Yellin, discovered a large subterranean hall from the Byzantine period that he turned into a travellers' inn, which provided overnight shelter for pilgrims on their way to Jerusalem.

Additional land purchased by Yellin from Qalunya and 'Ain Karim in 1891 was concentrated by the Bnai Brith Society as an agricultural settlement. The first four families arrived in 1894. Conditions were harsh until 1898, when the first wine was produced and by 1900 there were 22 residents.

=== British Mandate ===
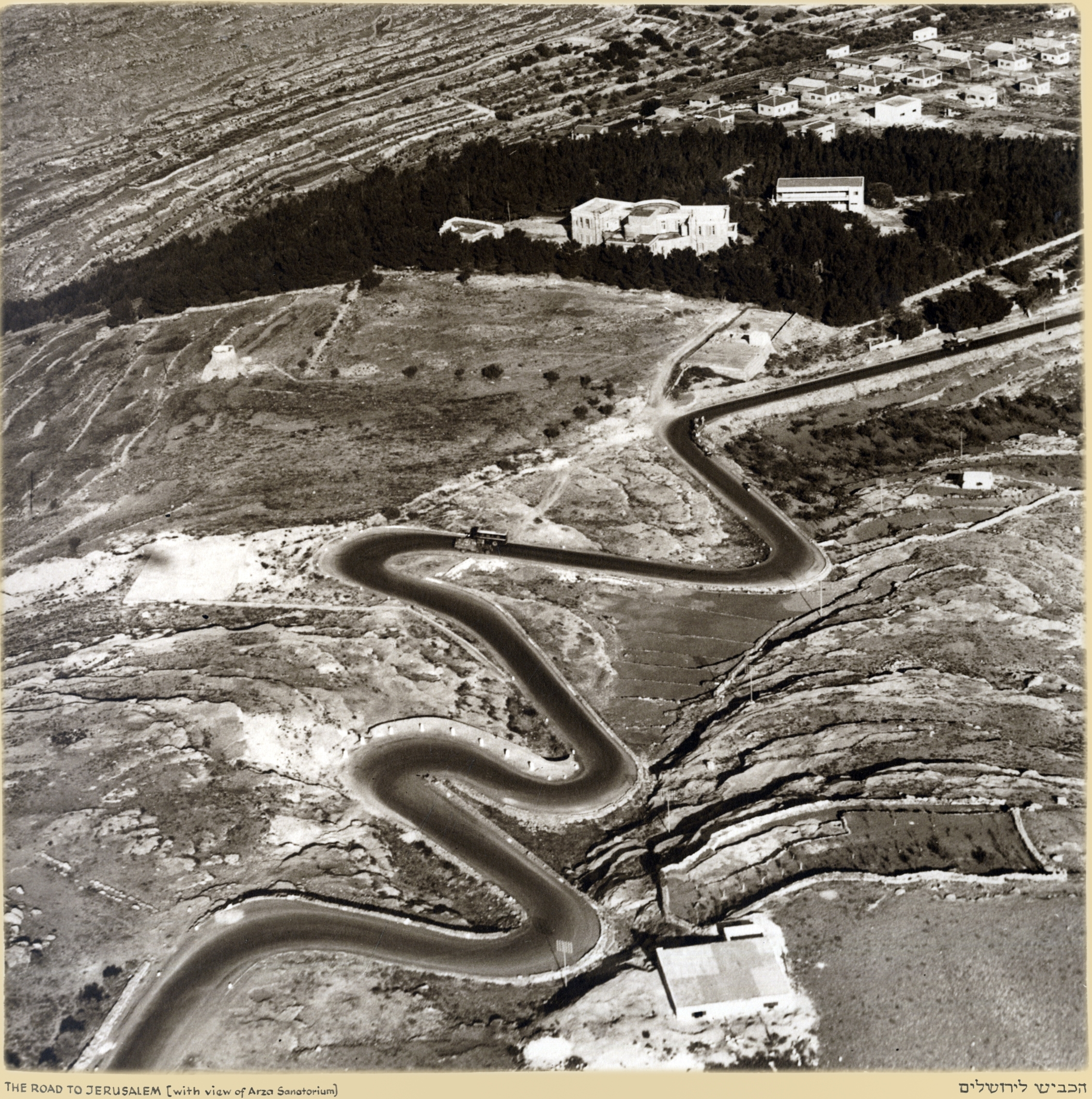
Azra sanatorium. Zoltan Kluger, 1937

David Remez named the sanatorium opened in the village of Arza, 'cedar', in reference to Herzl's tree. Arza, established in the 1920s, was the first Jewish "health resort" in the country.

A tile factory originally established by Yechiel Michel Steinberg in 1880, operated in Motza from 1923 to 1949.

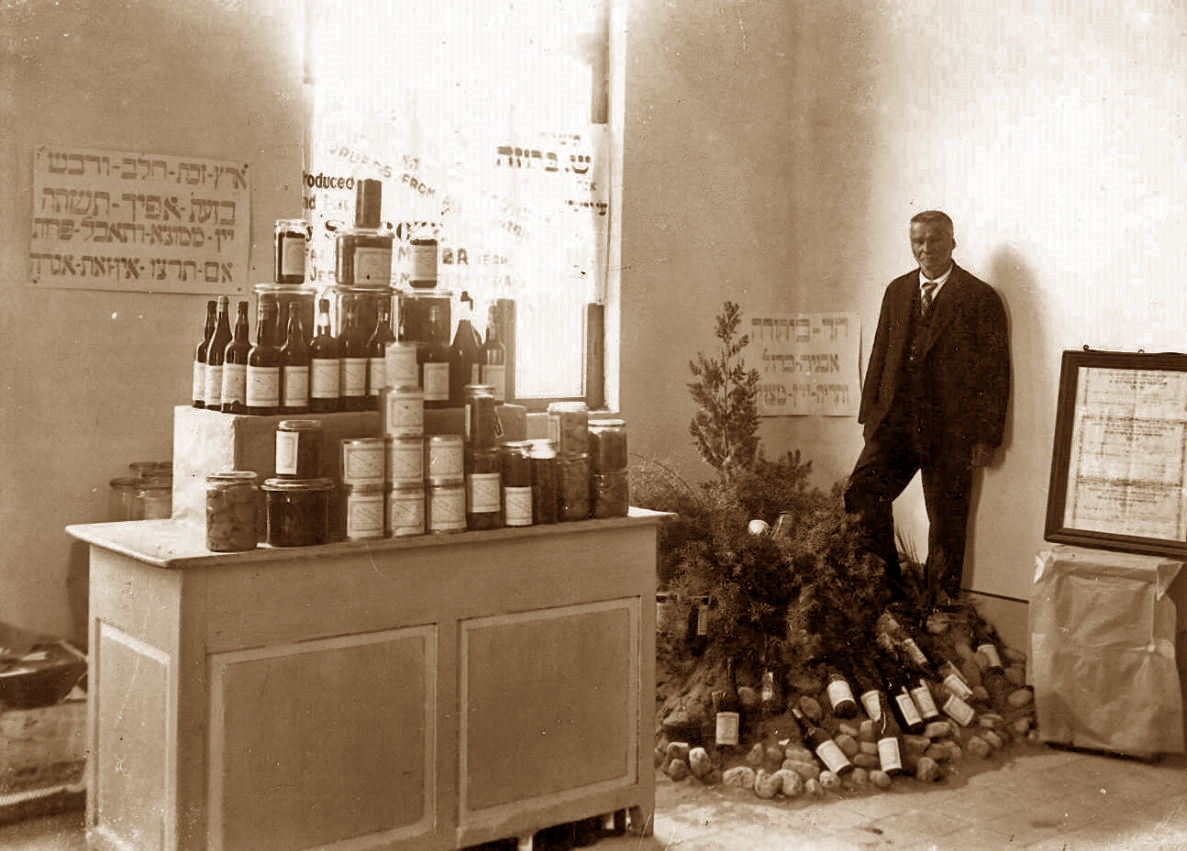
Farmer Shmuel Broza in Motza, 1930

The flourishing orchard of the Broza family is mentioned in the Hope Simpson Report in 1930. The children of Motza attended school in one of the rooms built above the vaulted hall. Their teacher was Moshe David Gaon, later the father of singer and actor Yehoram Gaon. Motza was the only Jewish presence in the area. Kfar Uria and Hartuv were further west in the Judean foothills.

According to a census conducted in 1931 by the British Mandate authorities, Motza had a population of 151 inhabitants, in 20 houses.

In 1933, the villagers founded the neighbouring Upper Motza (Motza Illit).

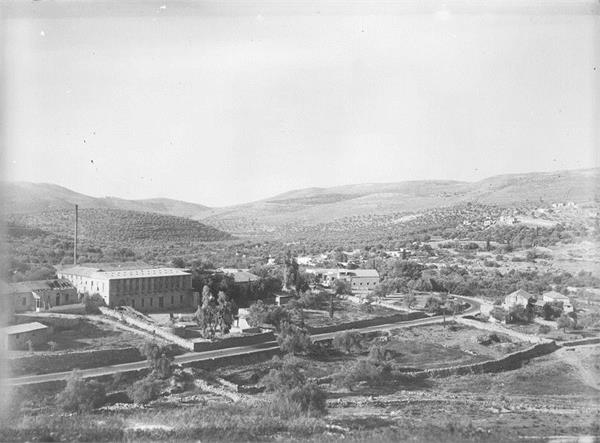
Motza tile factory 1934

In December 1948, United Nations General Assembly Resolution 194 recommended that "the built-up area of Motsa" be included in the Jerusalem "Corpus separatum", which was to be detached from "the rest of Palestine" and "placed under effective United Nations control". However, like other provisions of Resolution 194, this was never carried out in practice, and Motza became part of the State of Israel.

==== 1929 murders ====
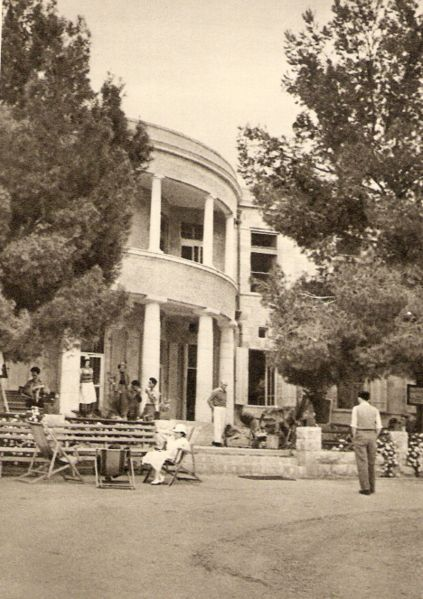
The Arza sanatorium, 1934

The village was attacked during the 1929 Palestine riots; residents had turned down offers from the Haganah to protect the community, as the residents of Motsa had longstanding positive relations with the people of Qalunya. An outlying house belonging to the Makleff family was attacked, and the father, mother, son, two daughters, and their two guests were killed. Twelve residents of Qalunya were charged with the murders, but the judge found them not guilty on account of contradictions in the Jewish evidence. The defence claimed that the murders were done by Bedouin, which the judge called "pure invention". The village was subsequently abandoned by Jews for a year.

Refugees from Motza sent a letter to the Refugee Aid Committee in Jerusalem describing their plight and asking for help: "Our houses were burned and robbed...we have nothing left. And now we are naked and without food. We need your immediate assistance and ask for nothing more than bread to eat and clothes to wear."

=== State of Israel ===
Qalunya was depopulated and mostly destroyed in 1948.

In 2006, the Yellin and Yehuda families helped restore Joshua Yellin's original home, among the oldest and most derelict buildings at the site.

From a municipal perspective, Motza, now called Ramat Motza, is affiliated with the Jerusalem Municipality. The nearby Motza Illit is under the jurisdiction of the Mateh Yehuda Regional Council.

== See also ==
- En Esur, Chalcolithic fortified proto-city in the Sharon Plain
