= Eliyahu Sasson =

Israeli politician, diplomat and minister (1902–1978)

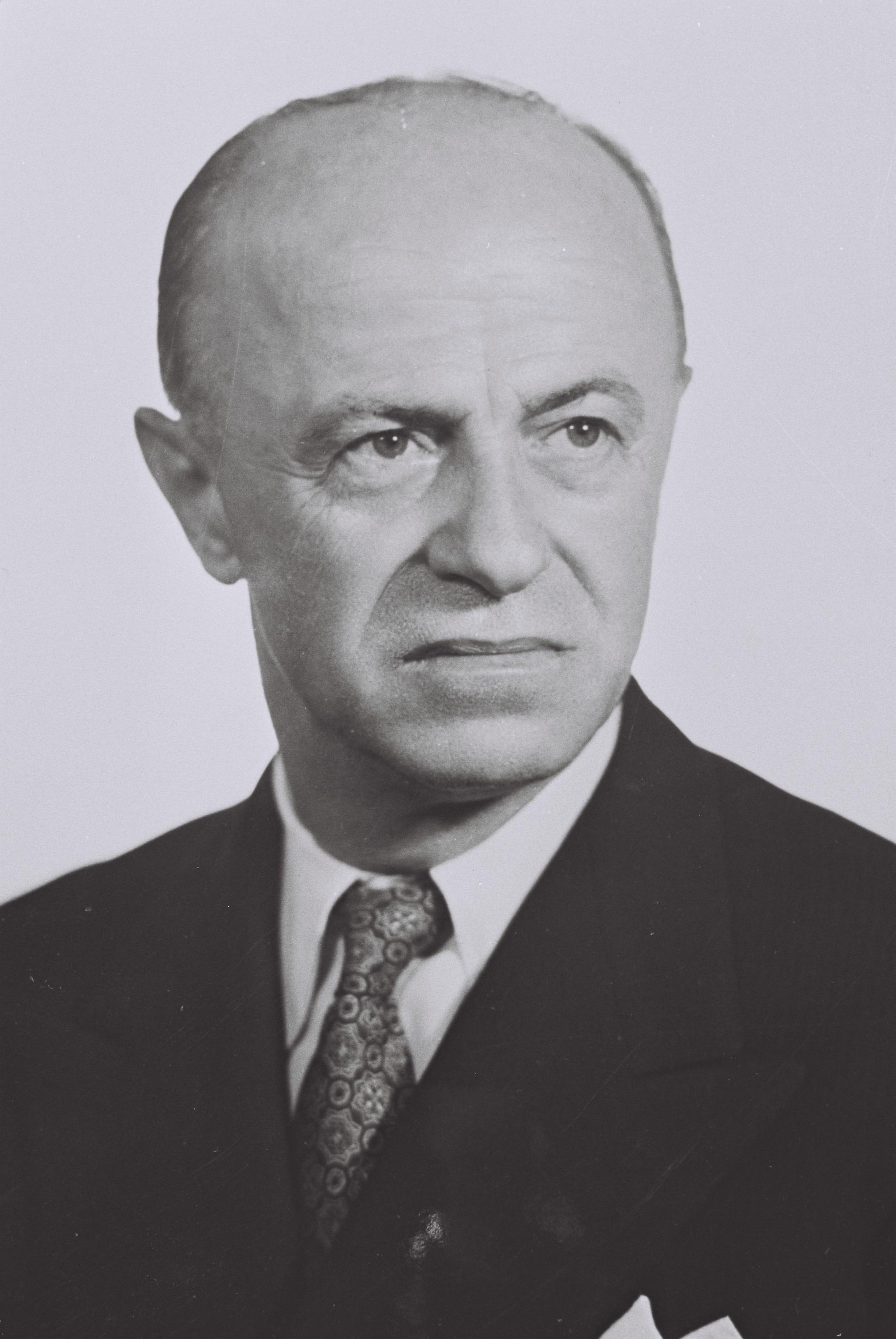
- Sasson in 1969

Ministerial roles
- 1961–1967: Minister of Postal Services
- 1967–1969: Minister of Police

Faction represented in the Knesset
- 1965–1968: Alignment
- 1968–1969: Labor Party
- 1969–1974: Alignment

Diplomatic roles
- 1953–1960: Ambassador to Italy
- 1960–1961: Ambassador to Switzerland

Personal details
- Born: 2 February 1902 Damascus, Ottoman Empire
- Died: 8 October 1978 (aged 76)

Eliyahu Sasson (Hebrew: אליהו ששון; Arabic: إلياهو ساسون; 2 February 1902 – 8 October 1978) was a diplomat, member of the Knesset and minister in the government of Israel.

== Biography ==
=== Education ===
Sasson was born in Damascus in Ottoman Syria. He studied at an Alliance School in his hometown, went to high school at the prestigious "Alezaria" Christian high school in Damascus alongside Christians and Muslims of the upper class and graduated from the Université Saint-Joseph in Beirut.

=== Zionist activity within the framework of the Syrian National Movement ===
In his youth, starting in 1918, he worked as part of the Syrian National Movement and under the patronage and funding of King Faisal, he published an Arabic newspaper called "Al Hayat" and edited it to promote "understanding and cooperation in the Middle East between Jews and Arabs". At the same time he engaged in Zionist activity, and led struggles of the younger generation in Damascus to give a Hebrew-Zionist tone to the Jewish Community Committee and its schools. He wrote many articles on this topic for Hebrew newspapers published in Israel such as Do'ar HaYom. In the years 1919-1920 he was involved in establishing and editing a newspaper called "Al-Sharq" (The East), a Zionist newspaper in Arabic that was published in Damascus for a short period. In the years 1922–1927, he fled from the French Mandate authorities and lived in the city of Mersin in Turkey. Through journalistic writing, he maintained contact with Faisal's camp "which tried to preserve the embers of Arab nationalism and called for the elimination of the imperialist factor and the establishment of an Arab state".

=== Intelligence and political activity until the end of the War of Liberation ===
In 1927 Sasson immigrated to Mandatory Palestine, where he worked as a laborer, and at the same time engaged in public activity as a lecturer on Middle Eastern affairs. After years of independent activity while criticizing the Yishuv establishment regarding the treatment of Arabs and deprivation of the Jews of Arab countries, he became a member of the Jewish Agency. Between 1934 and 1948 he headed the agency's Arab department, issuing a daily report on the Palestinian Arab press and background papers based on analysis of the Middle East press and meetings with Arab leaders. He was also engaged in intelligence gathering, and among other things recruited in Egypt Yolande Harmer, a Jewish journalist born in Alexandria, who carried out espionage missions for the agency and worked for French intelligence and the interests of the Yishuv and the State of Israel on the eve of the War of Independence, during which the Prime Minister of Syria, Jamil Mardam. With the establishment of the state, he was appointed director of the Middle East Department at the Ministry of Foreign Affairs. Before that he was a member of the delegation to the United Nations (1947–1948). In 1948 and 1949 he was a member of the Israeli delegations to the armistice talks at the end of the War of Independence with Egypt and Lebanon. He was then a member of the delegation to the Lausanne Conference, and later headed the delegation (1949).

=== Ministry of Foreign Affairs and Israeli Governments ===
While in the Ministry of Foreign Affairs, Sasson served as the head of the special office in Paris for relations with the Arabs, Israel's chargé d'affaires to Turkey (1950–1952), Israel's chargé d'affaires and Ambassador in Rome (1953–1960) and Israel's Ambassador to Switzerland (1960–1961).

In 1961 he returned to Israel in order to join David Ben-Gurion's government as Post Office Minister. He also held this position under the Levy Eshkol government until the beginning of January 1967, when he was appointed Minister of Police in place of Bachor-Shalom Sheetrit who retired for health reasons. As the post minister, he opposed the recommendations of a committee headed by Zvi Dinstein that recommended transferring the telephone services in Israel to a company whose shares would initially be in the hands of the government, because of concern for the employees, and therefore the recommendations were not implemented.

He served as Police Minister until the end of 1969, under Levi Eshkol and Golda Meir. Upon Sasson's entry into the position, he was given a position lacking authority and led a struggle to transfer authority from the police to the Ministry of National Security. In addition, Sasson pushed for the transfer of the Police National Headquarters to Jerusalem.

In 1965 Sasson was elected to the Sixth Knesset on behalf of the Alignment Party and in 1969 was re-elected to the Seventh Knesset. During his years of office, he was a member of the Foreign Affairs and Security Committee, the Interior Committee, and the Labor Committee.

=== Views on Israel after the Six day War ===
A few days after the end of the Six-Day War, as a minister in the first unity government led by Levi Eshkol, he took on the role of "Rebuker at the gate" (Note: A phrase that has biblical and traditional Jewish connotations, often referring to a person who offers moral guidance or criticism to the community) and in a series of comprehensive background memos for the government meetings (June 1967-July 1968), alongside his public appearances in the Knesset plenum, in party forums and lectures, he preached to launch an Israeli initiative whose main purpose was to take advantage of the results of the war - the occupied territories, the West Bank and the Gaza Strip, to solve the problem of Palestinian refugees from among the Arabs of the Land of Israel. He believed that direct negotiations with the representatives of the Arab population in the Land of Israel would at the very least lead to peace with them, if within the framework of Transjordan with an agreement and cooperation with Jordan, or if within the framework of the West Bank only - an independent Palestinian state or an autonomous Palestinian unit that will be bound by agreements with Israel, and would be likely to neutralize the root of the Arab–Israeli conflict and the main weapon of confrontation in the hands of the Arab world against the State of Israel.

In 1970 he warned that the annexation of the West Bank, with the demographics at that time, would turn Israel into a bi-national state.

Sasson died in October 1978 at the end of a serious illness that had confined him to bed for several years and had forced him to retire from his position as Minister of Police. He was buried in Har HaMenuchot in a funeral attended by thousands.

=== Family ===
From 1921 until his death he was married to Julia (Yael) née Zagol-Levi. The two were parents of three daughters and a son.

His daughter Rina married Raphael Levy, who served as the head of the Jerusalem district in the Ministry of the Interior, his son Moshe Sasson was a diplomat, who served among other things as ambassador to Italy and the Vatican and as ambassador to Egypt, his daughter Ora married Aviad Yaffeh, a diplomat and member of the Knesset.
