= Frank Barat =

French activist, author and film producer

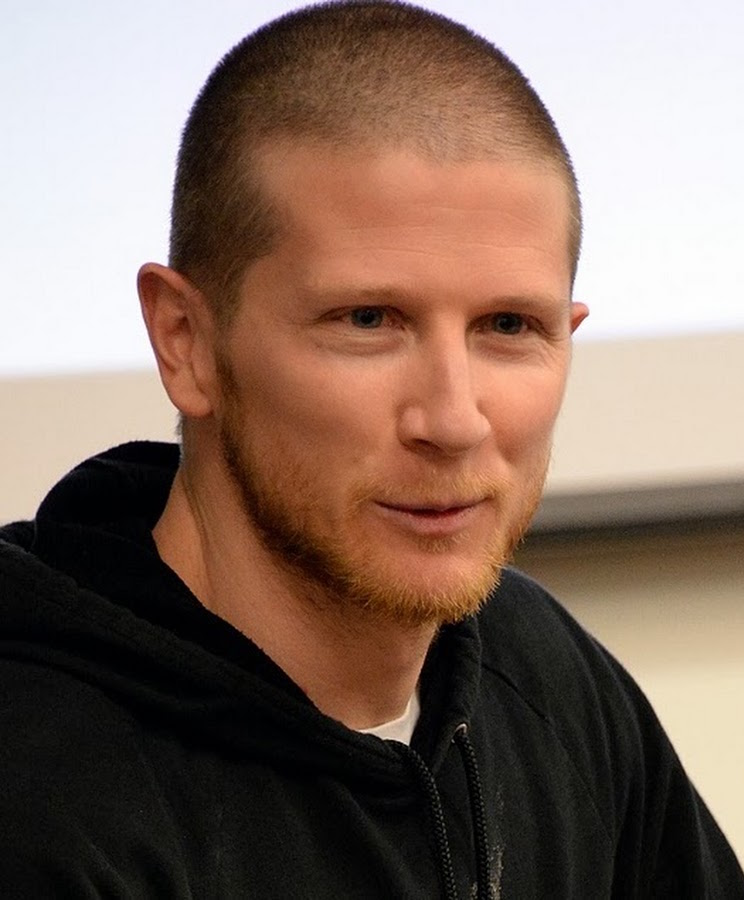
- Frank Barat at SOAS 2014
- Born: France
- Occupations: Activist, author, film producer
- Writing career
- Notable works: As editor: Gaza in Crisis by Noam Chomsky; On Palestine by Noam Chomsky; Freedom Is A Constant Struggle by Angela Davis; As contributor: Défier le récit des puissants by Ken Loach

Frank Barat is a French activist, author and film producer. He was the coordinator of the Russell Tribunal on Palestine from 2008 until 2014. He is the co-founder of BARC Productions, a film production company, created in Brussels in February 2019. He has edited books with Noam Chomsky, Ilan Pappé, Ken Loach and Angela Davis. He was part of the founding team of the Festival Ciné-Palestine in Paris and the Palestine with Love festival in Brussels.

== Books ==
- Editor: Gaza in Crisis: Reflections on Israel's War Against the Palestinians by Noam Chomsky (Haymarket Books, 2010)
- Editor: On Palestine (Haymarket Books, 2015)
- Contributor: Défier le récit des puissants (Defying The Mighty) by Ken Loach (Indigène Editions, 2014)
- Editor: Freedom Is A Constant Struggle, Palestine, and the Foundations of a Movement By Angela Davis Haymarket Books 2016
- Co-author (with Asa Winstanley): Corporate Complicity in Israel's Occupation Evidence from the London Session of the Russell Tribunal on Palestine.
- Co-author (with Asa Winstanley): Russell Tribunal Palästina. Die Sitzungen in Barcelona im März 2010 und in London im November 2010. Laika-Verlag, Hamburg 2011, ISBN 978-3-942281-07-2.

== Documentaries ==
- Director/producer: Nine days In Palestine, 2008. During the winter of 2007 a group of 18 people took part in a study tour with the Israeli Committee Against House Demolitions. The aim was to gain a better understanding of the situation by witnessing the facts on the ground.
- Director/producer: Life Under Occupation, 2008. A documentary about life in Palestine and more especially in Nablus, the biggest city of the West Bank.
- London Recruits, 2020. Co-producer, London Recruits, 2020. A Barefoot Rascals production in association with BARC Productions. During the 60s and 70s young revolutionaries, recruited in London, undertook daring missions inside Apartheid South Africa for the ANC. Director & producer: Gordon Main.
