= Forever Pure =

2016 British-Israeli documentary film

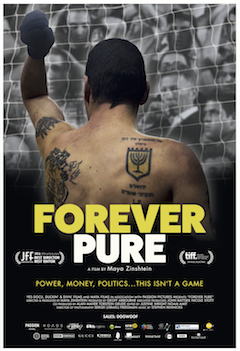
- Theatrical release poster
- טהורה לעד
- Directed by: Maya Zinshtein
- Produced by: Geoff Arbourne
- Starring: Eli Cohen; Arcadi Gaydamak; Ariel Harush; Ramzan Kadyrov; Dzhabrail Kadiyev; Itzik Korenfine; Ofir Kriaf; Reuven (Ruvi) Rivlin; Zaur Sadayev
- Cinematography: Sergei (Israel) Freedman
- Edited by: Justine Wright and Noam Amit
- Music by: Stephen Rennicks
- Production companies: Inside Out Films; Maya Films
- Distributed by: Yes Docu
- Release date: 12 July 2016 (Jerusalem Film Festival)
- Running time: 85 minutes
- Country: Israel
- Language: Hebrew

Forever Pure (Hebrew: טהורה לעד, romanized: Tahorah La'ad) is a 2016 British-Israeli documentary film directed by Maya Zinshtein.

The film was released on Netflix on 6 July 2017 and went on to win a News & Documentary Emmy Award in 2018.

== Production ==
Production for the film began in 2012 when Zinshtein, who was working as a journalist, made short segments for the investigative program Uvda ("Fact").

Zinshtein, who was freelancing for the Israeli show, was assigned to follow two Chechen players for a few hours on their first day in Israel. After four days of filming, she realised that the story would not end there. After the short TV segment had been shown, she decided to do it by herself and started a four-year journey of making the feature documentary.

== Synopsis ==
Beitar Jerusalem F.C. is the most popular and controversial football team in Israel, the only club in the Premier League never to sign an Arab player. Midway through the 2012–13 season, a secretive transfer deal by the owner, Russian-Israeli oligarch Arcadi Gaydamak, brought two Muslim players from Chechnya (Zaur Sadayev and Dzhabrail Kadiyev).

The deal brought intense opposition and protests from fans, politicians and even other players, in particular led by the La Familia Beitar supporters group.

The story is reflective of Israeli society, and highlights problematic issues regarding racism, personal identity, politics, and money.

== Release ==
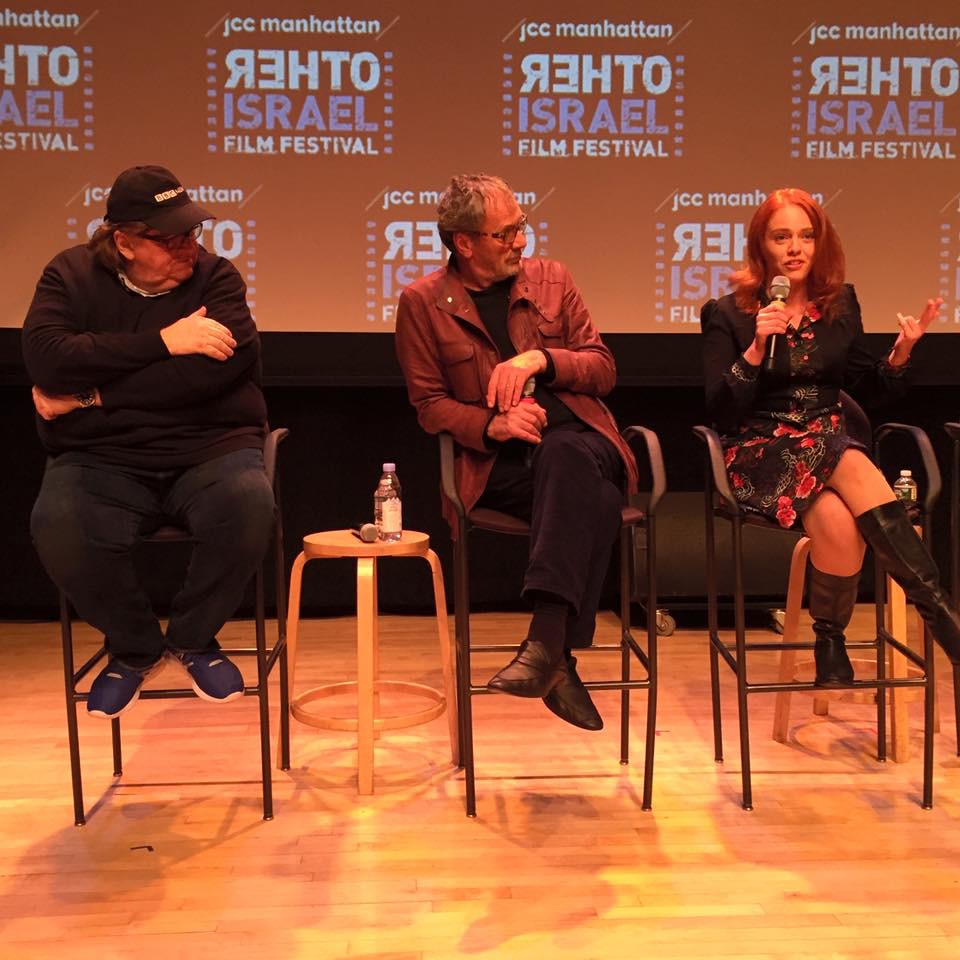
Maya Zinshtein speaking at an event panel discussion about the power of filmmaking for social change at the 10th Anniversary Other Israel Film Festival, with: Michael Moore, Mohammad Bakri, Tony Copti, Udi Aloni, and Chelsey Berlin

Forever Pure premiered at the Jerusalem Film Festival on July 08, 2016. The film competed in the documentary section, and it won The Van Leer Award for Best Director of a Documentary, The Haggiag Award for Best Editing and The Jewish Experience Awards – Honorable Mention. The film then went on to have its International première at the Toronto International Film Festival.

== Reception ==
=== Critical reception ===
Forever Pure received critical acclaim. Review aggregation website Rotten Tomatoes certified the film as "fresh" with a score of 94%.

Wendy Ide found the film to be an "eye-opening documentary that traces the tumultuous 2012-13 season, during which the political affiliations of a vocal group of the team's loyal fans threatened to tear the club to pieces... [a] high quality-piece of factual filmmaking."

=== Accolades ===
After airing in the United States on the PBS series Independent Lens, Forever Pure won a News & Documentary Emmy Award in 2018 for Outstanding Politics and Government Documentary.

== See also ==
- 'Til Kingdom Come
