= The Idea of Israel =

2014 non-fiction book by Ilan Pappé

- Author: Ilan Pappé
- Publisher: Verso Books
- Publication date: 2014
- ISBN: 978-1844678563

The Idea of Israel: A History of Power and Knowledge is a non-fiction book written by professor and historian Ilan Pappé about the Zionist ideology's role in Israeli education, media, and film. It was published in 2014 by Verso Books. The book discusses three periods in the effort to define Zionism: the classic Zionist account of the history of Israel; the emergence of the post-Zionism movement in the 1990s; and the rise of neo-Zionism, which Pappé argues is a highly nationalistic and racist ideology.

The Guardian praised Pappé's expertise in the subject matter of the Israeli–Palestinian conflict, observing the author as "one of the few Israeli students of the conflict who write about the Palestinian side with real knowledge and empathy". A review in The Independent said The Idea of Israel is an academic book at its core which offers a thought-provoking experience for its readers. In the academic journal, Journal of Palestine Studies, the work, while providing a coherent narrative, is noted for diverging from the writing style of the author's earlier books.

== Summary ==
The book examines mainstream Zionism's representation—the academic and cinematic historiography—‌of the 1948 Palestine war and founding of the State of Israel. Pappé asserts that the Zionist narrative was necessary to market the newly formed Israel as the only democracy in the Middle East, to explain the expulsion of Palestinian Arabs, and condemn their resistance to the establishment of a Jewish state. He notes that this narrative attributes resistance to Israel to Islamist fanaticism and a culture of violence in the Arab world.

Pappé discusses the lives and works of early dissenters to Zionism—‌the anti-Zionists. Israeli academia leading up to the Yom Kippur War in 1973 was obediently patriotic and Zionist. He recounts the emergence of the post-Zionist movement in the 1990s, particularly how the decade lead to divergences and challenges to truisms of Zionism in academia by New Historians and the public domain. Pappé also analyzes works which compare Israel's teachings of The Holocaust—‌particularly its causes and impact—‌to its justification of harsh policies toward the Palestinians.

In the final two chapters of The Idea of Israel, Pappé describes the rise to prominence of neo-Zionism, which he characterizes as a highly nationalistic and racist version of Zionism that views any criticism of Israel as treasonous. The impact of the ideology on an ethnocentric Israeli education system and anti-Palestinian legislation is documented.

== Release and reception ==
The Idea of Israel was published by Verso Books in 2014.

The Guardian published a book review by Avi Shlaim. Shlaim wrote that The Idea of Israel observes Zionism under an "uncompromising lens", and thought highly of the author's expertise in the subject matter, for "he is one of the few Israeli students of the conflict who write about the Palestinian side with real knowledge and empathy". Nolan Ramby of the International Socialist Review said The Idea of Israel is "an excellent and timely work that should be read by anyone interested in the history of Zionist ideology". In The Independent, Alistair Dawber called the work an academic book at its core which challenges readers with original, thought-provoking ideas.

Professor Gilbert Achcar, writing for the Institute for Palestine Studies, considered the book's chapters on post-Zionism as "the most comprehensive account of the post-Zionist phenomenon to this date"; he was, however, critical of it not providing a chapter dedicated to the historical contextualization of post-Zionism. The academic journal, Journal of Palestine Studies, published a review by University of California professor Gil Hochberg, who noted that the author's writing style differs from his earlier works like The Ethnic Cleansing of Palestine. Hochberg concluded The Idea of Israel is "more like a textbook, in bringing together many examples, names, and anecdotes to form a coherent picture of the evolution of the main Israeli schools of thought and the leading cultural trends from 1948 to the present".
