= African Apocalypse =

2020 documentary by Rob Lemkin

- Directed by: Rob Lemkin
- Written by: Femi Nylander; Rob Lemkin
- Produced by: Geoff Arbourne; Rob Lemkin; David Upshal
- Starring: Femi Nylander; Toby Stephens; Stéphane Cornicard; Pierre Mignard; Christophe Hespel; Philippe Smolikowski; Amina Weira; Boubacar Assan Midal
- Cinematography: Claude Garnier
- Edited by: David Charap
- Music by: Tunde Jegede; Sunara Begum
- Production companies: Inside Out Films and LemKino Pictures
- Release date: 16 October 2020 (LFF)
- Running time: 88 minutes
- Countries: Niger; United Kingdom
- Languages: English; French; Hausa

African Apocalypse is a 2020 documentary film directed and produced by Rob Lemkin. It features Femi Nylander and was produced by Geoff Arbourne and David Upshal. The film portrays a journey from Oxford, England, to Niger on the trail of a colonial killer called Captain Paul Voulet. Voulet’s descent into barbarity mirrors that of Kurtz in Joseph Conrad's Heart of Darkness. Nylander discovers that Voulet’s massacres happened at exactly the same time when Conrad wrote his book in 1899. In Niger, Nylander meets Nigerien communities along the route of Voulet’s trail who have lived with the legacy of his destruction.

The film was broadcast by the BBC in May 2021 as an episode of the Arena documentary series.

Among other critical attention it received, African Apocalypse was described by Phil Hoad in The Guardian as a "fascinating historical documentary-cum-personal journey. ...[Nylander] is doing invaluable work here, disinterring another collectively obscured tragedy and presenting it back to Europe as part of a long-overdue revision of colonialism."

== Cast Member ==
- Toby Stephens (Readings from 'Heart of Darkness'(voices)
- Stephane Cornicard (Colonel Klobb(voice)
- Pierre Mignard (Paul Voulet(voice)
- Christophe Hespel (Officer(voice)
- Philippe Smolikowski (Foreign Minister(voice)
- Femi Nylander
- Amina Weira
- Boubacar Assan Midal (Assan Ag Midal Boubacar
- Lucien Ntabona (Tirailleur(voice).

== Film festivals ==
African Apocalypse premiered at the 64th BFI London Film Festival on 16 October 16, 2020. The film competed in the Debate strand.
