= Geoff Arbourne =

British film producer

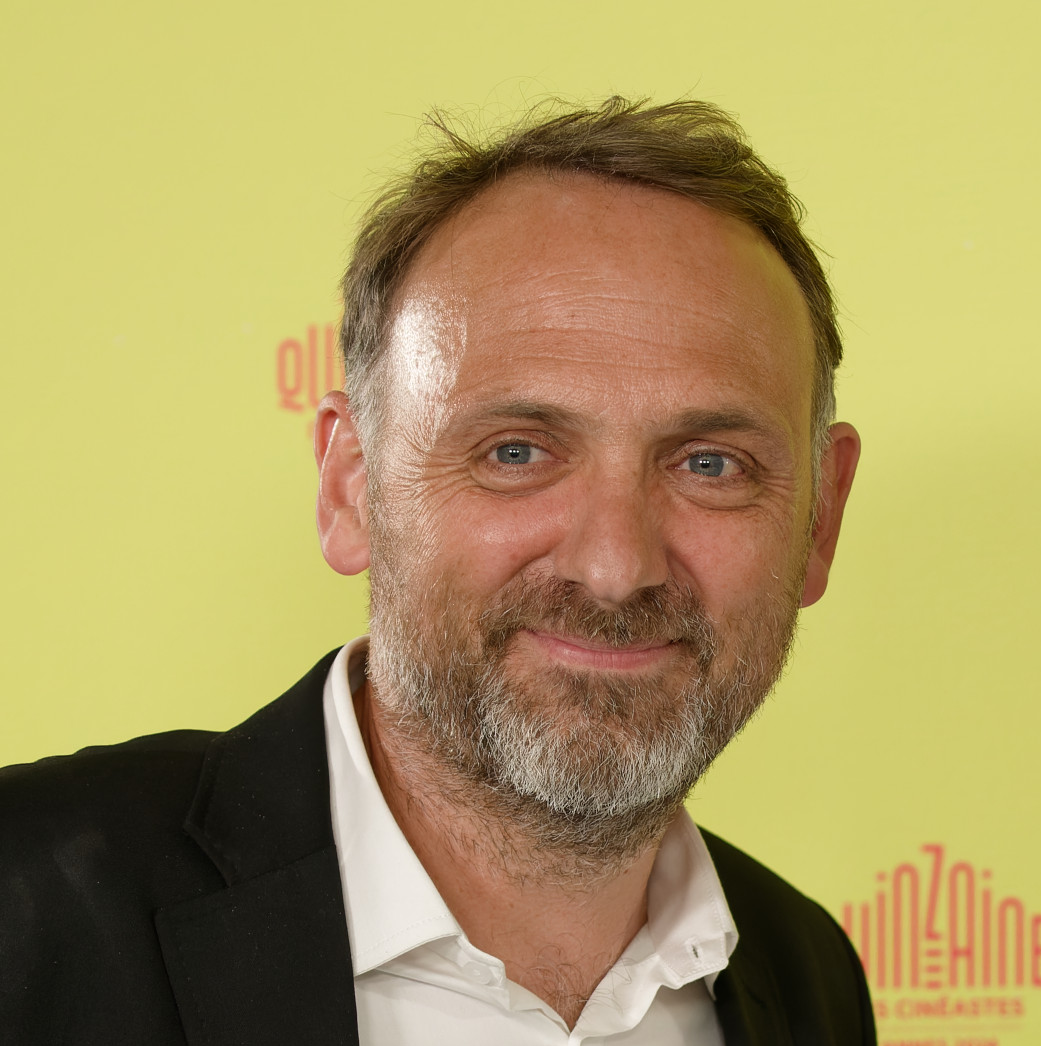
- Arbourne at the 2024 Cannes Film Festival
- Occupation: British film producer
- Notable work: Forever Pure
- Awards: News & Documentary Emmy Award

Geoff Arbourne is a British film producer and founder of Inside Out Films, an independent company that specialises in film production and television production.

His films have been shown in film festivals worldwide, broadcast on the BBC (Storyville (TV series), Independent Lens and Canal+ and available on demand on iTunes, Amazon Prime and Netflix. His awards include; a News & Documentary Emmy Award in 2018 for Outstanding Politics and Government Documentary, and Tromsø International Faith in Film Award.

In 2015, he produced one of the first short documentaries, Beitar Jerusalem, for The Guardian online platform. It attracted over a million views within the first 24 hours. He then went on to produce the Emmy Award-winning feature documentary Forever Pure, supported by the Tribeca Institute and Sundance Institute. Forever Pure had its international premiere at Toronto Film Festival in 2016, played over 100 festivals, winning numerous awards, and was broadcast or on demand on BBC Storyville, iTunes and Netflix. Releasing the film caused a significant backlash from many of the Beitar fans, putting the director Maya Zinshtein's life at risk.

In 2024, Arbourne produced To a Land Unknown, a feature film directed by Mahdi Fleifel. The film follows two Palestinian cousins stranded in Athens as they attempt to reach northern Europe. A UK–French–German–Greek–Qatari–Dutch–Palestinian co-production, To a Land Unknown premiered in the Directors' Fortnight section at the 77th Cannes Film Festival, where it was the only Palestinian feature film selected that year. The film was widely praised for its powerful portrayal of exile and resilience, and went on to screen at more than 120 international festivals, winning multiple awards, including Best Feature at the Festival international du film indépendant de Bordeaux.

Arbourne is an affiliate member of Producers Alliance for Cinema and Television (Pact).

== Filmography ==
=== As production company ===
Year	Film title	Notes
2011	Blikkiesdorp	Short film
2012	Seeds of Discontent	Short film in association with the Transnational Institute
2015	Beitar Jerusalem	Short international documentary commissioned by The Guardian
2016	Forever Pure	In association with Passion Pictures; distributed by Dogwoof
2016	Forbidden Games: The Justin Fashanu Story	Available on Amazon Prime
2020	African Apocalypse	World Premiere at the BFI London Film Festival on 16 October 2020. The film was supported by the BBC and Doc Society
2024	London Recruits	Official Opening Film at the Joburg Film Festival on 28 February 2024. It went on to win Best Documentary. The film was supported by the Ffilm Cymru Wales and KwaZulu-Natal Film Commission
2024	To a Land Unknown	World Premiere at the Cannes Film Festival within Directors' Fortnight; International Sales by Salaud Morisset
