= The Ethnic Cleansing of Palestine =

2006 book by Ilan Pappé

- Author: Ilan Pappé
- Language: English
- Genre: History
- Published: 2006 (Oneworld Publications)
- Publication place: Israel
- Media type: Print
- Pages: 313 pp
- ISBN: 978-1-85168-555-4

The Ethnic Cleansing of Palestine is a book authored by New Historian Ilan Pappé and published in 2006 by Oneworld Publications. The book is about the 1948 Palestinian expulsion and flight, which Pappe argues was an ethnic cleansing.

The thesis of the book is that the displacement of the Palestinians during the 1948 Palestine war was an objective of the Zionist movement and a must for the establishment of Israel as a Jewish state. (Note: Pappé (2006), Preface xvii "I want to make the case for the paradigm of ethnic cleansing and use it to replace the paradigm of war as the basis for the scholarly research of, and the public debate about, 1948.") According to Pappé, the 1948 Palestinian expulsion and flight resulted from a planned ethnic cleansing of Palestine that was implemented by David Ben-Gurion and a group of advisors referred to by Pappé as "the Consultancy". (Note: Laila Parsons, McGill University "One of the new elements in Pappe’s narrative is his use of the label “The Consultancy” to name the group of men (Ezra Danin, Yehoshua Palmon, and Eliahu Sasson, among others) who regularly consulted with David Ben-Gurion before and throughout the war.") (Note: Pappé 2006 "The list begins with the indisputable leader of the Zionist movement, David Ben-Gurion, in whose private home all early and later chapters in the ethnic cleansing story were discussed and finalised. He was aided by a small group of people I refer to in this book as the ‘Consultancy’, an ad-hoc cabal assembled solely for the purpose of plotting and designing the dispossession of the Palestinians.") The book argues that the ethnic cleansing was put into effect through systematic expulsions of about 500 Arab villages, as well as terrorist attacks executed mainly by members of the Irgun and Haganah troops against the civilian population. Ilan Pappé also refers to Plan Dalet and to the village files as a proof of the planned expulsions.

== Background ==
The idea that the 1948 events were the results of a planned expulsion had already been suggested by historians Walid Khalidi in Plan Dalet: The Zionist Master Plan for the Conquest of Palestine (1961) and Nur Masalha in Expulsion of the Palestinians: The Concept of "Transfer" in Zionist Political Thought (1991). Yoav Gelber published an answer criticizing the interpretation of Plan D made by Walid Khalidi and Ilan Pappé: History and Invention. Was Plan D a Blueprint for Ethnic Cleansing? (2006).

Benny Morris proposed several interpretations. The conclusion of his main work on the topic The Birth of the Palestinian Refugee Problem (1989) is that the exodus was the "result of war, not intent". Nevertheless, he stated later that "[i]n retrospect, it is clear that what occurred in 1948 in Palestine was a variety of ethnic cleansing of Arab areas by Jews. It is impossible to say how many of the 700,000 or so Palestinians who became refugees in 1948 were physically expelled, as distinct from simply fleeing a combat zone." In an interview with Ha'aretz in 2004, he also defended the idea that having performed an ethnic cleansing in 1948 had been a better choice for the Jews than living a genocide. In his last book about the 1948 War: 1948: A History the First Arab-Israeli War (2006), he nuanced all this and stated that:

[d]uring the 1948 War, (...) although there were expulsions and although an atmosphere of what would later be called ethnic cleansing prevailed during critical months, transfer never became a general or declared Zionist policy. Thus, by war's end, even though much of the country had been "cleansed" of Arabs, other parts of the country—notably central Galilee—were left with substantial Muslim Arab populations (...).

== Critical reception ==
=== Analysis in peer-reviewed journals ===
Ben Gurion University professor Uri Ram's review in the Middle East Journal concluded that "Pappe provides here a most important and daring book that challenges head-on Israeli historiography" as well as "collective memory and even more importantly Israeli conscience".

Jørgen Jensehaugen, in the Journal of Peace Research, while calling the book "a good read", faults Pappé for claiming that the preplanned expulsion of Palestinians was "the reason for the war", rather than merely "one aspect of the various war plans".

Ephraim Nimni, in the Journal of Palestine Studies, commends Pappé on the book's "polemical character", but claims that the Zionist leaders were not solely responsible for the ethnic cleansing:

Consequently, even if Pappé’s chronology is correct, and there is no reason to doubt this, the book does not provide a sufficient explanation for the ethnic cleansing of Palestine. No matter how meticulous the planning by the leaders of the Yishuv (settlers) was, it would have been to no avail without an unusual concatenation of international events (the genocide of European Jewry, the onset of the cold war, the closing of liberal democratic gates to Jewish refugees, the emancipation of colonies in North Africa, and last but not least the hegemony of the model of the ethnic nation-state as the only available avenue for national emancipation).

Laila Parsons of McGill University wrote of the book that "Ilan Pappe has added another work to the many that have already been written in English on the 1948 Arab–Israeli War and the expulsion of more than 750,000 Palestinians from their homes. These include works by Walid Khalidi, Simha Flapan, Nafez Nazzal, Benny Morris, Nur Masalha, and Norman Finkelstein, among others. All but one of these authors (Morris) would probably agree with Pappe’s position that what happened to the Palestinians in 1948 fits the definition of ethnic cleansing, and it certainly is not news to Palestinians themselves, who have always known what happened to them."

Ahmad H. Sa'di, in International Affairs, "highly recommended" the book.

=== Mainstream media responses ===
Critical analysis appeared in The New Republic. In his review of The Ethnic Cleansing of Palestine, fellow new historian Benny Morris wrote, "At best, Ilan Pappe must be one of the world's sloppiest historians; at worst, one of the most dishonest. In truth, he probably merits a place somewhere between the two." Morris argued, "Such distortions, large and small, characterize almost every page of The Ethnic Cleansing of Palestine."

Ian Black, The Guardian's Middle East editor, reviewed it, calling it a "catalogue of intimidation, expulsion and atrocity". He also pointed out that Pappé "does historical understanding a disservice by all but ignoring the mood and motives of the Jews, so soon after the end of a war in which six million had been exterminated by the Nazis." Summarising:

Emphasis apart, it is hard to say what is new in his account. The scheme discussed at the Tel Aviv meeting, Plan Dalet, has been known about for years. It has long been clear that the Palestinians were not, as used to be claimed, encouraged to leave their homes "temporarily" by Arab leaders. The fledgling Israeli state was not invaded, as the old David and Goliath narrative goes, by five Arab armies. Egypt attacked in the south and Jordanian and Iraqi troops entered the territory allotted to the Palestinians by the UN. Ethnic cleansing in Palestine is Israel's "original sin" laid bare—but without any mitigating circumstances.

David Pryce-Jones, writing in the Literary Review, calls Pappé "an Israeli academic who has made his name by hating Israel and everything it stands for".

To him, Israeli politicians and soldiers, one and all, are so many murderers. Forests have been planted only to cover up the past. Houses are "monstrous villas and palaces for rich American Jews". Everything Israeli is ugly, everything Palestinian is beautiful. For evidence of Israeli monstrosity, he relies on quotations from his own previous works or from Palestinian polemicists, and above all on the oral testimonies of Palestinian refugees. Over half a century of military and ideological conflict has passed since their exodus, but Pappe declares his faith that whatever they now say is true.

Stephen Howe, professor of the history of colonialism at Bristol University, said that Pappé's book was an often compelling mixture of historical argument and politico-moral tract. According to Howe, while the book will not be the final word on the events of 1948, it is "a major intervention in an argument that will, and must, continue".

== See also ==
- Causes of the 1948 Palestinian exodus
- History of Israel
- Depopulated Palestinian locations in Israel
- Palestinian genocide accusations

== Footnotes ==
- Pappé, Ilan (2006). The Ethnic Cleansing of Palestine. Oneworld. ISBN 978-1-85168-555-4.
