= Village files =

Military intelligence documents on every Arab village in Mandatory Palestine

Village files were military intelligence documents based on a card index system, with detailed data on every Arab village in Mandatory Palestine. Gathered by the Shai, they were the basis of Haganah and Palmah operations during the 1940s. The files answered the need of combat intelligence for the number of men in the village, the number of weapons, the topography and so on, dealt with the research of traces of ancient Jews in the villages, and with the possibility of buying land from the villagers and settling it.

== Origins ==
The suggestion for these files came from Ben-Zion Luria, an historian from the Hebrew University of Jerusalem, who wrote in 1940 to the Jewish National Fund (JNF) that "This would greatly help the redemption of the land". Yossef Weitz, the head of the JNF settlement department immediately suggested that they be turned into a "national project". Yitzhak Ben-Zvi suggested that, apart from topographically recording the layout of the villages, the project should also include exposing the "Hebraic origins" of each village.

According to Ilan Pappé, in the early 1940s, topographers, (aerial) photographers and Orientalists worked on the files. Moshe Pasternak, who joined a data collection operation in 1940 said:

"We had to study the basic structure of the Arab village. This means the structure and how best to attack it. In the military schools, I had been taught how to attack a modern European city, not a primitive village in the Near East. We could not compare it [an Arab village] to a Polish, or an Austrian one. The Arab village, unlike the European ones, was built topographically on hills. That meant we had to find out how best to approach the village from above or enter it from below. We had to train our 'Arabists' [the Orientalists who operated a network of collaborators] how best to work with informants."

According to Gil Eyal, the information was rather gathered between 1945 and 1947 when between 600 and 1000 villages were "surveyed by scouts and informers as well as aerial reconnaissance".

== Purposes ==
According to Pappé, later the files were updated and much more details of the inhabitants were added. Towards the end of the Mandatory period more military information was added, like the number of guards and the number and quality of arms in a village, next to the already present information on how best to attack a village. The final update in 1947 focused on creating lists of ‘wanted’ persons in each village. The main criteria for inclusion were participation in actions against the British and the Zionists, and affiliation with a Palestinian political party or leader. Typically 20 to 30 out of 1500 inhabitants were on the lists.

According to Pappé in the late 1940s these files contained 'precise details [...] about the topographic location of each village, its access roads, quality of land, water springs, main sources of income, its sociopolitical composition, religious affiliations, names of its mukhtars, its relationship with other villages, the age of individual men (sixteen to fifty),' an index of hostility based on the level of the village's participation in the revolt of 1936, and a list of everyone who had been involved in the revolt with particular attention for those who had allegedly killed Jews.

According to Eyal the 'village files' gathered three types of information:

- They "answered the need of combat intelligence [reporting] the number of men in the village, the number of weapons, the topography and so on";
- Other items had to do with the needs of hasbara, the research of traces of ancient Jews in the villages;
- "Another interest was buying land from the villagers and settling it".

Eyal emphasizes that "the bulk of information in the files reflected the needs and point of view of the emerging Arabist expertise. (...) The Arabists could use this information to interpret the events in the village, but more importantly they could use it to act against the village and use this when needed". He points out it was used after 1948, e.g. during retaliation operations, but doesn't make any reference to a use during the 1948 Palestine War.

== Uses ==
According to Pappé, during the 1948 war, after the occupation of a village, if possible, the people on the list were identified, usually by an informer wearing a cloth sack over his head, and often shot on the spot.

Eyal refers to the use of the 'village files' by Israeli military governors after the 1948 War. According to him, they used them in the areas conquered by Israel in order to control the mukhtars and the Arab villagers.

According to Ian Black and Benny Morris the 'village files' were also used in the 1950s by Aman, Israel's military intelligence service, as the basis of their "intelligence on potential targets in the West Bank and the Gaza strip.". Eyal also refers to this use.

=== Modern use ===
Meron Benvenisti used the village files as an example showing the level of detail on one Palestinian village: Abu Zurayq.

== See also ==
- Intelligence (information gathering)
- Causes of the 1948 Palestinian exodus
