= 'Til Kingdom Come (film) =

- Directed by: Maya Zinshtein
- Written by: Mark Monroe
- Produced by: Maya Zinshtein; John Battsek; Abraham Troen
- Cinematography: Abraham Troen
- Edited by: Elan Golod
- Music by: Miriam Cutler
- Production companies: Ventureland; Passion Pictures; Israeli Public Broadcasting Corporation
- Release dates: 2020 (Israel); February 26, 2021 (United States)
- Running time: 76 minutes
- Countries: United Kingdom; Israel; Norway
- Languages: Hebrew; Arabic; English

'Til Kingdom Come is a 2020 documentary film directed by Maya Zinshtein. The film explores the alliance between Christian Zionists in the United States and Jewish Israeli settlers in the West Bank. It received generally positive reviews.

== Synopsis ==
'Til Kingdom Come focuses on International Fellowship of Christians and Jews (IFCJ) director Yael Eckstein, a Jewish Israeli, along with William Bingham III and Boyd Bingham IV, father and son pastors in Kentucky. It documents large donations made to the IFCJ by the Binghams' church despite the poverty of many of their congregants, using this phenomenon as a case study for Christian Zionism, a belief within dispensationalist versions of Evangelicalism that the gathering of Jews in Israel will bring about the Rapture or the Second Coming for Christians while sending Jews to Hell. In the film, Zinshtein argues that this "unholy alliance" between evangelicals in the United States and Jewish settlers in the West Bank provides political and material support for the establishment of Israeli settlements, leading right-wing Israelis to ignore the religious beliefs that underlie Christian Zionism.

== Production ==
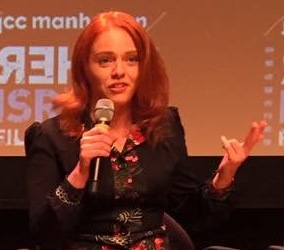
Director Maya Zinshtein at Other Israel Film Festival in 2016

'Til Kingdom Come was directed by Jewish Israeli filmmaker Maya Zinshtein and written by Mark Monroe. Production began in 2017; shooting for the film lasted 100 days. Producers included Zinshtein, John Battsek, and Abraham Troen, who was also director of photography; the executive producer of the film was Maxyne Franklin. The film was edited by Elan Golod and music was composed by Miriam Cutler. Production companies included Ventureland, Passion Pictures, and the Israeli Public Broadcasting Corporation. The North American distributor for the film is Abramorama; in Israel it is distributed by MetFilm.

The documentary film has a runtime of 76 minutes.

== Release ==
'Til Kingdom Come was released in Israel in 2020, and in the United States on February 26, 2021. In 2020 it was shown at Docaviv, the Chicago International Film Festival, Doc NYC, and the International Documentary Film Festival Amsterdam. It was additionally shown in February 2021 at the Atlanta Jewish Film Festival.

The documentary was scheduled to make its United States broadcast debut on PBS's prime-time Independent Lens platform in March 2021, but it did not air. A PBS blog post later stated that executives had cancelled the showing due to the film's editing of a speech by Donald Trump unveiling his peace plan for Israel–Palestine; the editing suggested that Trump had described the West Bank as part of Israel when he had not explicitly done so. As a result, PBS stated that they had initiated an independent review of the film to determine whether it was suitable to be shown. The Jewish Telegraphic Agency reported that the editing of the quote was likely reported to PBS by the Zionist Committee for Accuracy in Middle East Reporting in America.

== Reception ==
While controversial, 'Til Kingdom Come received generally positive reviews. Rotten Tomatoes reported an approval rating of 100% from 15 reviews, with an average rating of 7.7/10. On the critical aggregator Metacritic, the film has a score of 77, indicating "generally favorable" reviews.

A review in The New York Times found Zinshtein's approach effective, writing that her "patient, observant approach catches her subjects in moments of damning irony". It concluded that Boyd Bingham's "seeming good will cannot disguise his troubling convictions". Also in The New York Times, an article noted that the film brought about "a wave of guilt and soul-searching" in Israel but predicted that it would also "teach Christian and Jewish audiences in the United States a great deal about subjects they may have thought they already understood – including how American politics really work".

In Screen Daily, a positive review stated that the film provides "not only a disturbing picture of how extremist political and religious agendas are connected, but also a sense of the contradictions involved", concluding that it is "a well-researched, sharply organised exposition of a strange and disturbing set of alliances".

Jonathan Feldstein, who assisted Zinshtein with background information and contacts for 'Til Kingdom Come, wrote a column for Jewish News Syndicate in which he criticized the film. Feldstein described the film as "a one-sided, biased perspective of Christian support" for Israel, accusing Zinshtein of creating a "caricature" of Christian Zionists and characterizing one section of the documentary as having antisemitic undertones. IFCJ director Yael Eckstein stated that she believed the film reflected the political positions of its creators.

== See also ==
- Forever Pure
