= Justine Wright =

New Zealand film editor

- Occupation: Film editor
- Notable work: The Last King of Scotland; State of Play; Locke

Justine Wright is a film editor.

== Early life ==
Wright was born in Wellington, New Zealand.

== Career ==
In 2000, the film One Day in September, which Wright had edited, won an Academy Award for Best Documentary. She also won the Best Newcomer Behind the Camera award at the British Independent Film Awards for the same film.

In 2014, Wright won the European Editor of the Year Award at the European Film Awards. In 2016, she was co-winner (with Noam Amit) at the Jerusalem Film Festival of the Haggiag Award for Best Editing for her work in Forever Pure.

== Filmography ==
- One Day in September (1999) - won Best Documentary at the 72nd Academy Awards
- Late Night Shopping (2001) - won a BAFTA (Scotland) Best Feature Film award
- The Game of Their Lives (2002) - won Best Sports Documentary at the British Television Awards
- The Final Curtain (2002)
- Touching the Void (2003)
- The Last King of Scotland (2006)
- State of Play (2009)
- The Eagle (2011)
- The Iron Lady (2011)
- Locke (2013)
- Black Sea (2014)
- The Pass (2016)
- Forever Pure (2016)
- Denial (2016)
- Yardie (2018)
- The Mauritanian (2021)
- Luther: The Fallen Sun (2023)
- We Live in Time (2024)
- Prima Facie (2026)
