= Gaza in Crisis =

2010 book by Noam Chomsky and Ilan Pappé

- Book cover
- Authors: Noam Chomsky; Ilan Pappé
- Language: English
- Subject: Gaza War (2008–09)
- Publisher: Haymarket Books
- Publication date: November 9, 2010
- Publication place: United States
- Media type: Paperback
- Pages: 240 pages
- ISBN: 978-1-60846-097-7

Gaza in Crisis: Reflections on Israel's War against the Palestinians is a 2010 collection of interviews and essays from Noam Chomsky and Ilan Pappé that examine Israel's Operation Cast Lead and attempts to place it into the context of Israeli–Palestinian conflict. The book was edited by Frank Barat, who had conducted his first e-mail interview on the subject with Chomsky in 2005, as a result of his joint dialogue with Chomsky and Pappé, previously published in French as Le Champ du possible (Éditions Aden (Belgium), November 2008), which forms the heart of the work.

== Contents ==
=== Introduction ===
In his introduction, written in London in July 2010, Barat explains his decision to include a mix of interviews, dialogues and essays to answer to the question, "Why has this conflict lasted so long, who can stop it, and how?"

=== The Fate of Palestine: An Interview with Noam Chomsky ===
In this interview, conducted by Frank Barat in 2007, Chomsky highlights possible outcomes of the Palestine situation, the use of boycott and divestment and the important role that the U.S. plays in supporting Israel. He begins by outlining the punishing measures taken by Israel, with the support of the U.S., against the Palestinians following the democratic election of Hamas in January 2006, which he states might result in the death of the nation. The author contends that the most feasible alternative to this scenario is the two-state solution supported by the international community (except for Israel and the U.S.A.), despite his personal preference for a binational state as proposed by Edward Said. The author concludes that the vast majority of US citizens also support a two-state solution and the end of the unprecedented levels of US aid given to Israel, and could, with the necessary education and organisation, become a powerful force for peace.

=== Clusters of History: US Involvement in the Palestine Question ===
In this 2007 essay, originally published in Race & Class, Pappé focuses on five distinct clusters of history and how they have influenced US policy on Palestine. Evangelical preachers William Eugene Blackstone and Cyrus Scofield popularised Christian Zionism, which influences Republican Party policy in favour of Israel. The King–Crane Commission led by academics Henry Churchill King and Charles R. Crane propagated a briefly influential Arabist movement within the U.S. State Department. Any political opposition to Israel within the U.S. was however undermined by American politician Fiorello H. LaGuardia, pioneer of identity politics, and Canadian journalist Isaiah L. Kenen, founder of lobby group the American Israel Public Affairs Committee. The discovery of oil in the Middle East by five American oil companies, nicknamed the Five Sisters, resulted in a military–industrial nexus influential within the Republican Party with a pro-Arab stance, which has been largely sidelined by the Christian Zionists. American peace negotiations, inspired by the realist school of academics Hans Morgenthau and Kenneth Waltz, have condemned all efforts to failure by not taking Palestinian views into consideration. Pappé concludes that the result of the interaction of these clusters is not inevitable U.S. support for Israel and this could be changed in the future.

=== State of Denial: The Nakbah in Israeli History and Today ===
In this original essay Pappé seeks to examine Israel's erasure of the crimes of 1948, the 1948 Palestinian expulsion and flight (known in Arabic as the Nakba), from the collective memory and the importance of this denial. It was, according to the author, a policy of ethnic cleansing, rather than military engagement, which was in operation from 1947 until 1954, under Plan D issued by the Haganah, and that this had been an integral part of Zionism since its formulation in the late 19th century. While this policy has long been denied by Israeli authorities in their efforts to build a 'heroic' narrative for their fledgling nation state, he concludes, it has recently begun to be exposed to, and even accepted and supported by, the general population of the now established country.

=== "Exterminate All the Brutes": Gaza 2009 ===
In this reworked 2009 essay, based on a talk given at MIT on January 19, 2009, and originally published on ZNet and in The Spokesman, Chomsky examines the US–Israel instigated Gaza War, which he describes as morally depraved and compares to someone walking down the street unconcerned about killing ants as they consider them insignificant. The attack was, according to the author, carefully planned to cause disproportionate terror and maximum civilian casualties, rather than to defend itself against rocket attacks from Gaza as claimed. This aggression, he continues, is conducted with weapons and technology supplied and paid for by the U.S. government, including a shipment announced while the attack was in progress, at an unprecedented level of military aid set to increase under the Obama administration. The aim of the attack, which also included the bombing of Sudan and the sinking of a ship in the Red Sea, remains open to speculation, contends the author, but has resulted in an increase in support for HAMAS and other militant Islamist groups across the region. The author maintains that, as well as specific violations such as deploying US-made white phosphorus shells in attacks on the al-Quds hospital and the UNRWA compounds, the entire operation, aimed at the destruction of all means of life including agriculture, fisheries, industry and universities, was itself a war crime. The Israeli authorities had, according to the author, no right to use force to defend itself against the rocket attacks from Gaza while other more effective solutions were open to them, including the proposed resumption of the ceasefire violated by Israel linked to the lifting of the blockade. The author concludes that the Israeli authorities want peace but, in accordance with longstanding policy that puts expansion over security, want to delay that peace for as long as necessary to ensure they can control the maximum amount of land, and that this attack, designed to derail diplomatic negotiations, which had already greatly reduced the rocket attacks, was a crime against Israeli people as well as against the Palestinians.

=== Blueprint for a One-State Movement: A Troubled History ===
In this original essay Pappé seeks to examine the history and future trajectory of the one-state solution. The idea was first proposed by humanist Jewish settlers such as Yehuda Magnes who were manipulated into betrayal by the Israeli leadership while their partners in the Palestinian Communist Party were overruled by Moscow. The position was put forward by non-aligned nations as a minority report to UNSCOP but lost out due to pressure from Washington and Moscow. The Palestine Liberation Organization later took up the cause with support from the Arab League and Matzpen but eventually succumbed to external pressure. Pragmatic Zionism has long supported the two-state solution, and before that the Jordanian option, as it allows them to take the role of peacemaker on the international stage while continuing a policy of ethnic cleansing. The idealists who kept alive the one-state solution as the only viable option have more recently been joined by those disappointed by the repeated failures of the alternative and aware of the facts on the ground. It is now the task of this unstable alliance to present the true history and current reality of the conflict as well as finding answers to more practical considerations while they await the final collapse of the two-state solution.

=== The Ghettoization of Palestine: A Dialogue with Illan Pappé and Noam Chomsky ===
In this dialogue, originally published as Les Champs du possible (Arden Editions, November 2008) and extended following the 2010 Gaza flotilla raid, Pappé and Chomsky discuss the Israel–Palestine conflict with Frank Barat. The participants begin by noting a recent shift in international attitudes towards Israel due to the aggressive stance and refusal to accept criticism of the country's authorities. The participants concur that the U.S. government's unwavering support for Israel could change in the future despite the pro-Israeli stance of the then incoming Obama administration. Pappé supports the idea of international boycotts to advance this whilst Chomsky is more circumspect about the likelihood of their success. The participants both speak out against a possible third intifada as unlikely to succeed and counter-productive to these aims. The participants conclude by condemning the May 31, 2010, Gaza flotilla raid as a violent criminal act done to protect a criminal blockade and Pappé goes on to point out how this and the subsequent Israeli reaction confirm the previously mentioned aggressive stance and refusal to accept criticism of the country's authorities, which are an enduring barrier to peace.

=== The Killing Fields of Gaza 2004–2009 ===
In this original essay Pappé details how this former gateway community, which covers less than 2% of Palestine, has since 1948 been turned into an overpopulated and completely isolated refugee camp by the restrictive policies of the Israeli and Egyptian governments. Israeli authorities brought an end to the Second Intifada by segregating the West Bank into pacified Bantustans and subsequently turned their attention to Hezbollah in Lebanon and Hamas in Gaza. A 45 million dummy Arabic city built in the Negev desert in 2004 was used as a testing ground for a proposed attack on the Strip. Hamas responded to Israel's economic blockade and other provocations with missile attacks on Sderot and other nearby cities giving the Israeli authority pretext for the use of force in Operation First Rain. Frustration over the failed 2006 Lebanon War, lack of a political strategy for dealing with Gaza and the pretext offered by the Hamas capture of Israeli Defense Force Sergeant Gilad Shalit resulted in an escalation of these attacks with Operation Summer Rains and Operation Autumn Clouds, which as well as bombardment saw ground forces deployed in the Strip. This policy of asymmetric warfare in an urban setting became the Dahiyya Doctrine and resulted in Operation Cast Lead described by some commentators as genocide.

=== A Middle East Peace That Could Happen (But Won't) ===
In this revised excerpt from Hopes & Prospects (Haymarket Books, 2010), first published by TomDispatch, Chomsky gives his latest reflections on the peace process.

== Reception ==
=== Reviews ===
Publishers Weekly describes the book as a, "succinct and eye-opening collection of recent interviews and essays", and although, "much of the material collected here precedes Israel's recent military attack on a Gaza-bound international flotilla of embargo-breaking humanitarian aid," it "gives essential context to the crisis". "Pappé adds vital and unexpected historical background" to "Chomsky's consistent positions on everything from the origins of the Israeli–Palestinian conflict to the issue of a one- versus two-state settlement", although they, "are not perfectly in synch on every point", "the fundamentals of the crisis—and its scale in humanitarian, moral and political terms—are clear, as well as clearly expressed, between them." "This sober and unflinching analysis", the review concludes, "should be read and reckoned with by anyone concerned with practicable change in the long-suffering region".

The Guardian reviewer Steven Poole begins by stating that, "The Obama administration's latest wheeze, to bribe Israel to stop building settlements for three months by giving it warplanes, seems to justify anew the pessimism of Chomsky's essay here on a peace that could happen (but won't) and continues that, "Both authors perform fiercely accurate deconstructions of official rhetoric," although, "Their critiques are themselves performed rhetorically, as is no doubt inevitable." "Chomsky" he states, "appeals to the authority of his chosen sources (prominent, leading), though he also espouses views that may surprise some of his critics – against academic boycotts, and in favour of Hamas recognising Israel", while "Pappé retorts: Peace is made between enemies not lovers." He dismisses Pappé's, "claims that in the wake of 9/11 the US launched a total war against Islam," by concluding that, "Bush may have been a nuisance, but I do not remember him bombing the Maldives."

A brief review in The Independent concluded, "the only flaw is that, owing to the ever developing situation in the Middle East, it is already out of date (Chomsky admonishes Obama for propping up Egypt's now-deposed Mubarak regime)."
