= Dzhabrail Kadiyev =

Russian footballer (born 1994)

Dzhabrail Kadiyev Джабраил Кадиев
Personal information
- Full name: Dzhabrail Aslanbekovich Kadiyev
- Date of birth: 21 January 1994 (age 32)
- Place of birth: Grozny, Russia
- Height: 1.84 m (6 ft 0 in)
- Positions: Forward; defender

Youth career
- Terek Grozny

Senior career*
| Years | Team | Apps | (Gls) |
| 2011–2016 | Terek Grozny | 0 | (0) |
| 2013 | → Beitar Jerusalem (loan) | 1 | (0) |
| 2014–2016 | → Terek-2 Grozny | 46 | (14) |
| 2016 | Belshina Bobruisk | 11 | (1) |
| 2017–2018 | Druzhba Maykop | 16 | (1) |
| 2019–2021 | Legion Dynamo Makhachkala | 40 | (12) |
| 2023 | Druzhba Maykop | 4 | (0) |
| Total | | 118 | (28) |

International career
| 2011 | Russia U-17 | 2 | (0) |
- * Club domestic league appearances and goals

Dzhabrail Aslanbekovich Kadiyev (Russian: Джабраил Асланбекович Кадиев; born 21 January 1994) is a Russian former professional footballer.

== Club career ==
=== 2013: Loan to Beitar Jerusalem ===
On 30 January 2013, Kadiyev joined Israeli Premier League side Beitar Jerusalem along with Zaur Sadayev, who both played for Terek Gronzy.

On 10 February 2013, Kadiyev made his debut for the club in a 2–2 draw against Bnei Sakhnin F.C., when he was substituted in during the 80th minute, where he would receive a standing ovation, as well as every time he touched the ball.

== Personal life ==
Kadiyev is a Muslim.

He was featured in the British-Israeli documentary Forever Pure, about La Familia, Beitar Jerusalem's ultras group, and its anti-Arab and anti-Muslim beliefs.
