= La Familia (Beitar supporters' group) =

Israeli football ultras

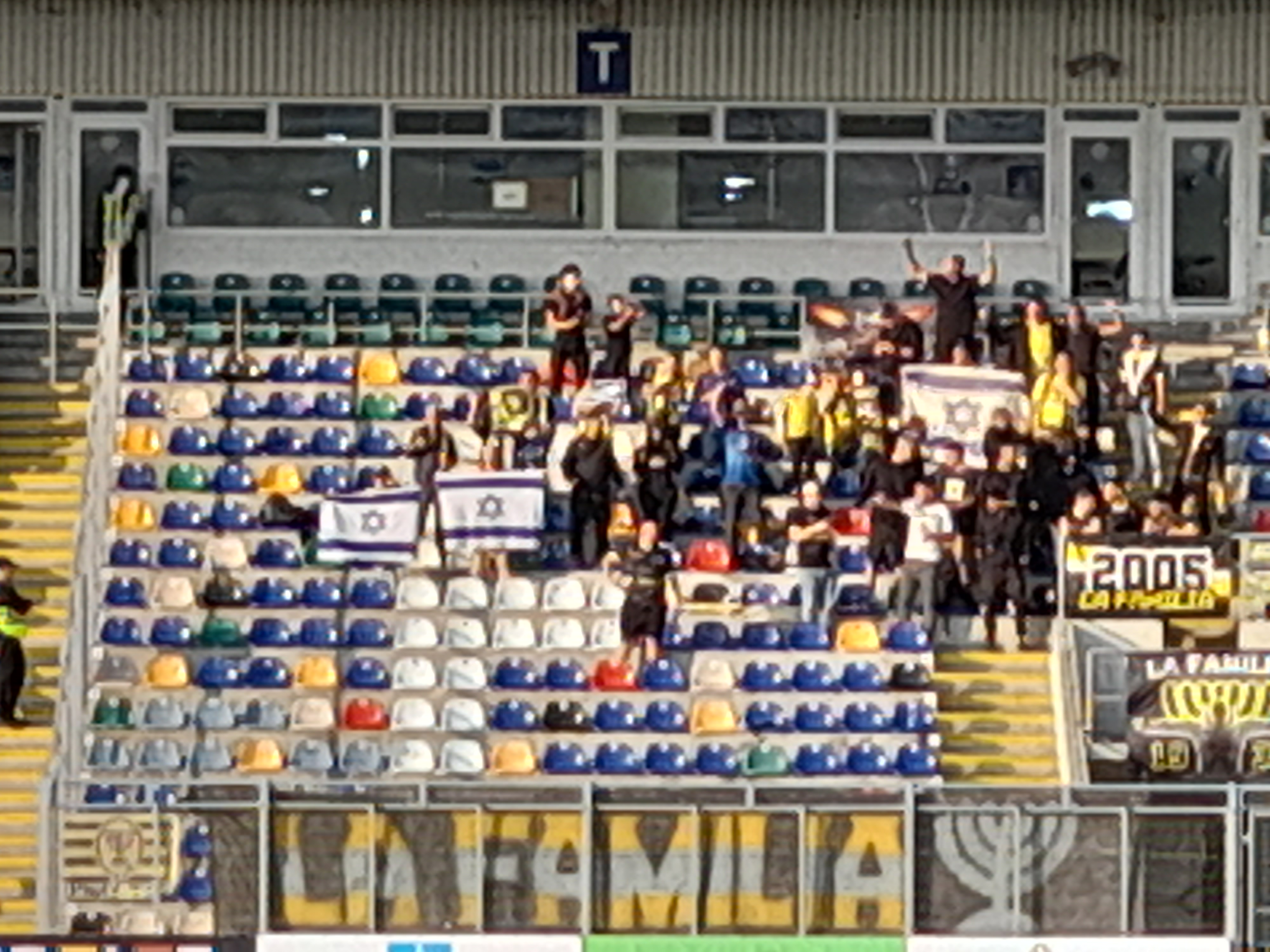
- Beitar Jerusalem fans at a 2025 UEFA Conference League match against FK RFS
- Founded: 2005
- Years active: 2005–present
- Territory: Jerusalem
- Activities: Football hooliganism, riots, vandalism

La Familia is an ultras group which supports the Israeli Premier League football club Beitar Jerusalem. The group is known for its far-right, Zionist extremism and anti-Arab racism.

== Organization ==
La Familia first organized in 2005 and congregated in the eastern sections of Teddy Stadium. Estimates of the group's size varies with a reporter putting the number at a few hundred, while a leader said that it encompassed a network of 3,000 supporters. In 2008, a BBC correspondent said that the group was about 20% of the crowd. They are the most vocal in the stadium, and some local fans follow their gameday chants.

The club's history is intertwined with the Betar Zionist youth movement, and has since been supported by several Israeli politicians on the political right. La Familia has similarly been labeled far-right and is openly against those they view as being on the left. Beitar has publicly condemned the group, going as far as barring its supporters from a match. Some Beitar fans have expressed embarrassment over the organization and openly oppose their ideals.

== Incidents ==
The group is notorious for chants insulting Arab players, and for displaying the flag of the banned Kach party. Chants with lines including "death to the Arabs" and "Muhammad is a homosexual" are common.

During a December 2007 Toto Cup semi-final game between Beitar Jerusalem and the Israeli-Arab team Bnei Sakhnin, La Familia sang provocative chants insulting the Islamic prophet Muhammad. The Israel Football Association (IFA) punished Beitar by forcing them to play their next game against Sakhnin with no fans present. Vandals set fire to the IFA's offices and left graffiti threatening the life of the IFA chairman. The graffiti included the initials "LF" for La Familia, but the group denied involvement. Bnei Sakhnin is the only Arab-Israeli club in the Premier League. Matches between the clubs often result in violence and arrests.

Beitar was disciplined in 2008 after fans disrupted a minute of silence to mark the death of Prime Minister Yitzhak Rabin. Later that year La Familia led a pitch invasion in what would have been a title-clinching win against Maccabi Herzliya. The IFA deducted two points from Beitar and ordered that the next game be played behind closed doors. In December 2011, fans yelled "Give Toto a banana" towards Nigerian-born Toto Tamuz. The IFA again punished Beitar with a two-point deduction and another game in an empty stadium.

Supporters stormed the Malha Mall after a match in March 2012 while chanting "Death to Arabs". It was reported that Arab workers were harassed and beaten. A few months later, a group of Beitar fans attacked a McDonald's where Arabs were among the staff.

The group was adamantly against the signing of Nigerian Muslim Ibrahim Nadallah who lasted half a season in 2005 and discouraged Muslims from joining the team, stating "the extremists won't change". The 2013 transfer of two Chechen Muslims, Dzhabrail Kadiyev and Zaur Sadayev raised anger from the supporters. Members of La Familia set a team office on fire after the announcement. Fans walked out of a match in March that saw Sadayev score his first goal for Beitar. As of December 2020, no Arabs have ever played for Beitar, unlike other top Israeli clubs, which is attributed to the group's protests.

During the second qualifying round of the Europa League, on 16 July 2015 at Sporting Charleroi, the game was delayed for three minutes due to the unruly behavior of the Israeli supporters when they threw flares on to the game's field and the Charleroi goalkeeper, Nicolas Penneteau, was hit by an object. This caused the owner, Eli Tabib, to decide to leave the club.

In 2016, undercover police infiltrated La Familia over a one month period, resulting in 56 arrests including nine soldiers and two minors on suspicion of selling weapons and violence.

On 12 October 2023, dozens of La Familia members attempted to enter the Sheba Medical Center in Tel HaShomer after reports emerged that a Hamas terrorist from the Gaza war had been treated there. Three members were arrested by police.
