= Comrade Tambo's London Recruits =

2024 British film

- Directed by: Gordon Main
- Written by: Gordon Main
- Produced by: Jacintha De Nobrega; Geoff Arbourne; Colin Charles; James Barrett; Felix Gill; Michael Watt
- Starring: Andy Burse; Jack Ayres; Bethany Billy; Isobel Zamek; Ieuan Coombs; Sechaba Ramphele; James Minett; Howy Bratherton; Mitchell Baggott; Tyler Reddington; Roget Ellis; Hannah May Jessop; Tumelo Nkwanca; Sechaba Ramphele; Alex Gwyther; Thami Dlamini; Connor Harris; Alan Cassidy; Tom Evans; Tumelo Nkwanca; Sam Medupe
- Cinematography: Gordon Main; Richard Lynch
- Edited by: Collin Games
- Music by: Sion Trefor
- Release date: 2024
- Country: United Kingdom
- Language: English

Comrade Tambo's London Recruits, also known as simply London Recruits, is a 2024 drama documentary thriller film that was a South African/Welsh co-production, written and directed by Welsh director/producer, Gordon Main. It is inspired by the true story of how the African National Congress (ANC) recruited volunteers in Britain in the 1960s and '70s, at the height of apartheid, to travel to South Africa for undercover missions. The film features interviews with surviving recruits, ANC comrades and South African security forces, interspersed with archive footage and dramatic reenactments.

== Synopsis ==
In 1967, South Africa is under the control of a militant white supremacist government, rigorously enforcing apartheid laws while crushing any organized opposition. Nelson Mandela languishes in prison, and underground resistance networks are systematically dismantled.

In this bleak landscape, ANC leader Oliver Tambo, operating from exile, devises a strategy to rebuild a new underground movement. However, this endeavor will require time. In the meantime, Tambo seeks to instill hope among the oppressed masses within South Africa.

Exploiting apartheid's inherent prejudices, Tambo recruits sympathetic whites people from London to conduct covert missions deep within the racist regime. Ronnie Kasrils, a dynamic young ANC fighter, is appointed to lead the London operation.

Ronnie's team smuggles leaflets into the country via postal channels. Through the perspective of Joyce Sikakane, a black journalist and ANC activist, we witness the distribution of these leaflets to individuals. However, efforts to inspire a broader audience result in torture and imprisonment, failing to deliver a message of hope to the millions suffering under apartheid.

In response to this setback, a clandestine propaganda tool is devised: the leaflet bucket bomb. Despite the risks involved, Sean, Steve, Kathy, and other courageous young Londoners volunteer to deploy these devices in South Africa. The resulting explosions are spectacular, disseminating thousands of leaflets without causing harm, effectively communicating the intended message. This marks a significant success. We witness the impact of these leaflets through the eyes of black journalist and ANC activist Joyce Sikakane.

Under increasing pressure, Ronnie entrusts Sean with another mission, which ultimately proves to be a trap. Sean finds himself condemned to death row as a result.

== Cast ==
- Andy Burse as Eddie Jones
- Jack Ayres as Ron Bell
- Bethany Billy as Diana Ellis
- Isobel Zamek as Katherine Salahi
- Leuan Coombs as Ken Keable
- Sechaba Ramphele as Chris Hani
- James Minett as Danny Schechter
- Howy Bratherton as Young Bob Allen
- Mitchell Baggott as Sean Hosey
- Tyler Reddington as Tom Bell
- Roget Ellis as Vic McPherson
- Hannah May Jessop as Sarah Griffiths
- Tumelo Nkwanca as Joyce Sikakane
- Alex Gwyther as Steve Marsling
- Thami Dlamini as Sandi Sijake
- Connor Harris as Bill McCaig
- Alan Cassidy as Business Traveller

== Development ==
In 2005, Ken Keable, who himself was a London Recruit, decided to write about his experiences going to South Africa for the ANC in the 1960s and '70s. "It took me three days to write my story, and when I had finished, I realised mine could possibly be one among many, so I began tracking down other recruits."

Eventually, 35 men and women, including Ronnie Kasrills, contributed to the book that was entitled London Recruits: The Secret War Against Apartheid.

In 2013, Gordon Main first heard about the story in a boxing pub near the docklands in Cardiff. He was sitting with a friend who was told by an elderly friend: "When I was your age I went to South Africa undercover with leaflets in a suitcase for Oliver Tambo." Main then arranged a meeting with the elderly person and discovered that there were several others with similar stories.

Main said, "Once I realized it was true, I thought this has just got a great movie written all over it." Later, Main obtained a copy Ken Keable's book and in 2014, met Ronnie Kasrills and made a creative pitch to Ken, Ronnie and a couple of other Recruits for the rights to make the story into a documentary. Early on, Main sought funding on Kickstarter.

In November 2017, producer Robyn Slovo – Tinker Tailor Soldier Spy producer, whose father Joe Slovo led the South African Communist Party during the final years of white racist rule – joined Welsh production company Barefoot Rascals as executive producer. She said, "London Recruits is a spellbinding thriller of espionage, death-defying missions and bravery told for the first time,"

In 2018, Main met Durban producer Jacintha de Nobrega at a KwaZulu-Natal Film Commission delegation to the BFI London Film Festival in 2018. "Jacintha made it clear that we should come to Durban and KZN to film," explains Main. "It was the making of our project.

== Production ==
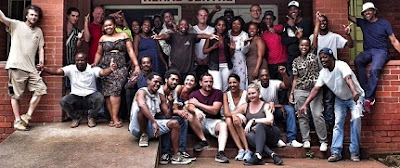
The cast and crew of London Recruits filmed in KwaZulu-Natal.

In March 2019, Haverhub, the old Art Deco post office at Haverfordwest in Wales, was transformed into eleven sets, including a London pub complete with fake cigarette smoke, secret training rooms, and a series of budget South African hotel rooms. Main, who is from Roch near Haverfordwest, stated that it was a great experience to be able to film in his home county. "I believe passionately in Welsh talent and I saw this as an brilliant opportunity to bring the production home," he said. Principal photography took place over six weeks early in 2020 in South Africa at Inanda, KwaZulu-Natal, Durban Central, the Durban High Court, Tinley Manor, Ballito, the Durban shipyard, and Shongweni Nature Reserve.

The film was produced by the Barefoot Rascals company in co-production with Arclight Productions in association with Deerstalker, Curlyman, Sensor Shot, BARC Productions, AfricanFuturist Arts and Inside Out Films.

== Release ==
London Recruits premiered at and opened the Joburg Film Festival on 28 February 2024 at Theatre on The Square, Nelson Mandela Square, Sandton, Johannesburg, South Africa. It went on to win Best Documentary 2024, when the jury stated: "London Recruits brought a fresh and different perspective. The use of humour and brilliant storytelling connects us all in our humanity." Its selection as the opening film speaks to its importance and relevance in African cinema.

== Reception ==
Newspaper critics have given positive reviews. Charles Leonard of South Africa's Mail and Guardian stated: "I prepared with a double espresso. Sometimes political doccies — even ones with a cracking storyline like this one — can be earnest, self-important and boring. But, at the end, I burst into spontaneous applause with the rest of the audience." He went on to say: "There are many reasons why it worked so well — a combination of using the larger-than-life Kasrils; lively interviews with several of the original recruits… ...wide-ranging footage beyond the typical apartheid-era material, including some sourced from private archives; re-enactments with well-cast actors; excellent cinematic storytelling and superb editing. In Hollywood's Variety magazine, Thinus Ferreira called the film "…an edge-of-your-seat documentary thriller set in the early 1970s, blending elements of espionage, courage, sacrifice and jaw-dropping twists."

== Accolades ==
London Recruits won the best Documentary 2024 at Joburg Film Festival.

Winner: Simon Mabhunu Sabela Award for Best Pan African Film 2024.
