= Ilan Pappé =

Israeli-British historian (born 1954)

- אילן פפה
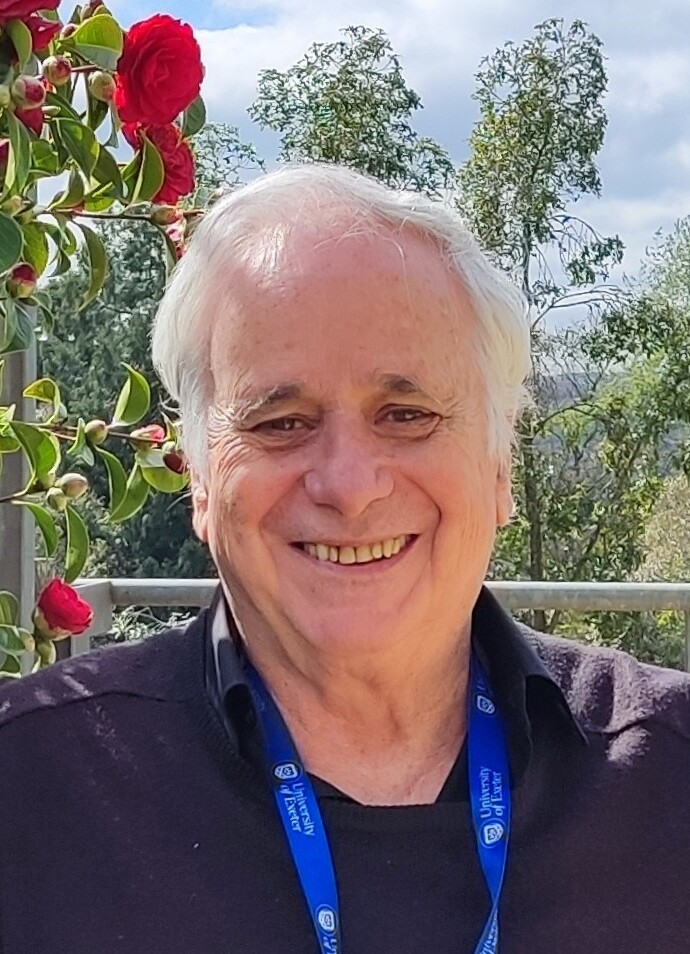
- Pappé in 2023
- Born: 7 November 1954 (age 72); Haifa, Israel

Academic background
- Education: Hebrew University of Jerusalem (BA); University of Oxford (DPhil)
- Thesis: British Foreign Policy Towards the Middle East, 1948–1951: Britain and the Arab–Israeli Conflict (1984)

Academic work
- Discipline: Historian
- School or tradition: Israel's New Historians
- Institutions: University of Haifa; University of Exeter

Ilan Pappé (Hebrew: אילן פפה [iˈlan paˈpe]; born 7 November 1954) is an Israeli historian and political scientist, known for his work on the Israeli–Palestinian conflict and as a leading figure among the New Historians. He is a professor at the University of Exeter's College of Social Sciences and International Studies, where he directs the European Centre for Palestine Studies and co-directs the Exeter Centre for Ethno-Political Studies.

Pappé's research focuses on the 1948 Palestinian expulsion and flight, which he characterizes as a deliberate ethnic cleansing campaign, citing Plan Dalet as a blueprint. His notable works include The Ethnic Cleansing of Palestine (2006), A History of Modern Palestine: One Land, Two Peoples (2003), and Ten Myths About Israel (2017).

Born in Haifa, Israel, Pappé was a senior lecturer at the University of Haifa (1984–2007) and chaired the Emil Touma Institute for Palestinian and Israeli Studies (2000–2008). He left Israel in 2008 after facing criticism in the Knesset and receiving death threats.

Pappé was active in Israeli politics as a member of the Hadash party and ran in the 1996 and 1999 elections. He advocates a single democratic state for Israelis and Palestinians and supports the BDS movement, including an academic boycott of Israel.

== Early life and education ==
Pappé was born in Haifa, Israel, to a family of Ashkenazi Jews. His parents were German Jews who had fled Nazi persecution in the 1930s. At the age of 18, he was drafted into the Israel Defense Forces (IDF) and served in the Golan Heights during the Yom Kippur War in 1973. He graduated from the Hebrew University of Jerusalem in 1978 with a Bachelor of Arts (BA) degree. He then moved to England to study history at the University of Oxford, completing a Doctor of Philosophy (DPhil) degree in 1984 under the supervision of British historians Albert Hourani and Roger Owen. His doctoral thesis was titled "British foreign policy towards the Middle East, 1948-1951: Britain and the Arab-Israeli conflict" and this became his first book, titled Britain and the Arab-Israeli Conflict.

== Academic career ==
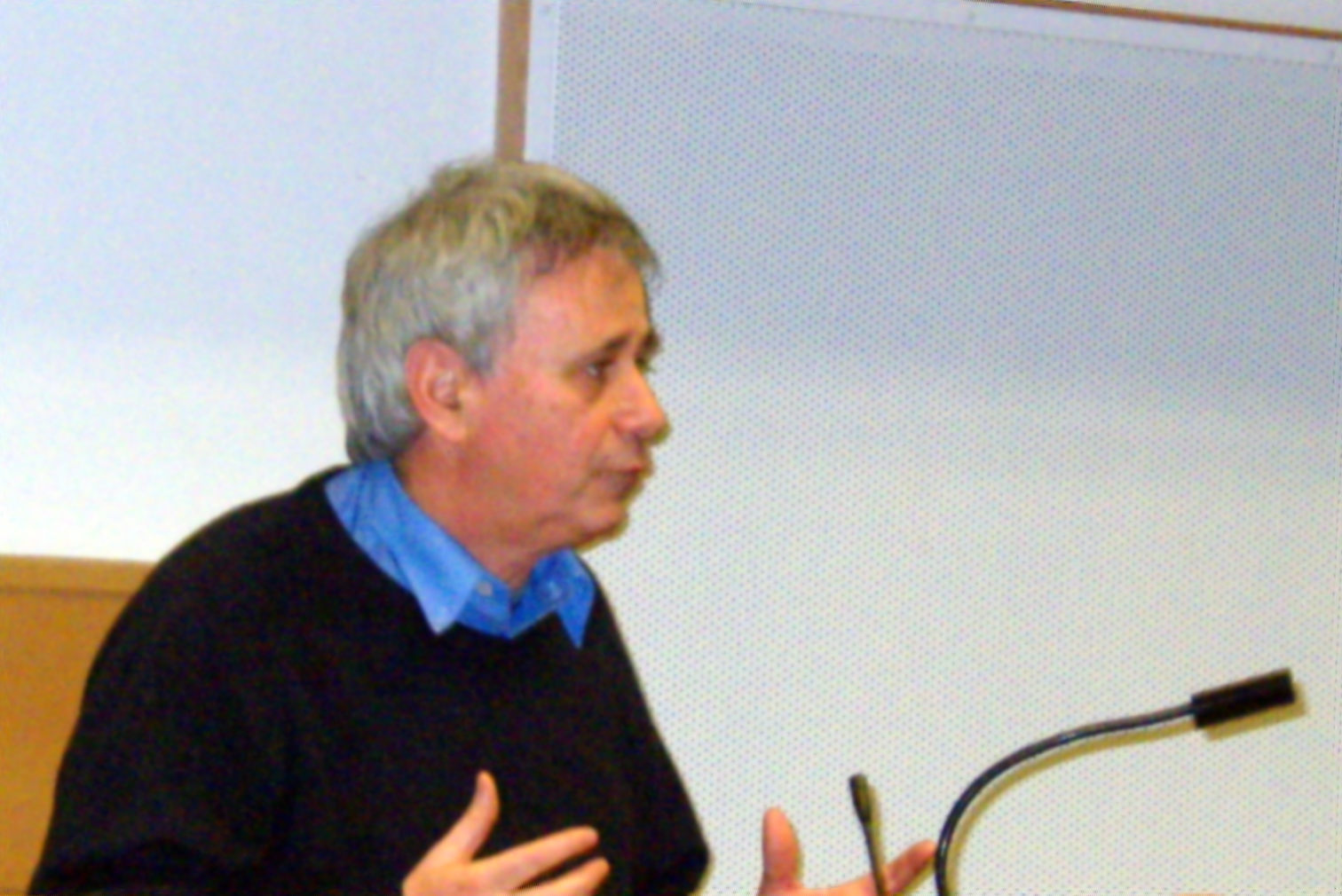
Pappé in a lecture in the Manchester Metropolitan University in 2008

Pappé was a senior lecturer at the Middle Eastern History Department and the Political Science Department of the University of Haifa between 1984 and 2006. He was the Academic Director of the Research Institute for Peace at Givat Haviva from 1993 to 2000, and chair of the Emil Touma Institute for Palestinian Studies.

Pappé left Israel in 2007 to take up his appointment in Exeter, after his endorsement of the boycott of Israeli universities led the president of the University of Haifa to call for his resignation. Pappé said that he found it "increasingly difficult to live in Israel" with his "unwelcome views and convictions." In a Qatari newspaper interview explaining his decision, he said: "I was boycotted in my university and there had been attempts to expel me from my job. I am getting threatening calls from people every day. I am not being viewed as a threat to the Israeli society but my people think that I am either insane or my views are irrelevant. Many Israelis also believe that I am working as a mercenary for the Arabs." He joined Exeter as Professor of History, and has been director of its European Centre for Palestine Studies since 2009.

=== Katz controversy ===
Pappé publicly supported an M.A. thesis by Haifa University student Teddy Katz, which was approved with highest honors, that claimed Israel had committed a massacre in the Palestinian village of Tantura during the war in 1948, based upon interviews with Arab residents of the village and with an Israeli veteran of the operation. Neither Israeli nor Palestinian historians had previously recorded any such incident, which Meyrav Wurmser described as a "made-up massacre". According to Pappé, "the story of Tantura had already been told before, as early as 1950... It appears in the memoirs of a Haifa notable, Muhammad Nimr al-Khatib, who, a few days after the battle, recorded the testimony of a Palestinian." In December 2000, Katz was sued for libel by veterans of the Alexandroni Brigade and after the testimony was heard, he retracted his allegations about the massacre. Twelve hours later, he retracted his retraction. During the trial, lawyers for the veterans pointed to what they said were discrepancies between the taped interviews Katz conducted and descriptions in Katz's thesis.

Katz revised his thesis, and, following the trial, the university appointed a committee to examine it. After reviewing the taped interviews and finding discrepancies between them and what was written in the thesis, Katz was allowed to submit a revised thesis. Pappé continues to defend both Katz and his thesis. Tom Segev and others argued that there is merit or some truth in what Katz described. According to the Israeli New Historian Benny Morris: "There is no unequivocal proof of a large-scale massacre at Tantura, but war crimes were perpetrated there."

In January 2022, Alon Schwarz's film Tantura was shown at the 2022 Sundance Film Festival World Cinema Documentary Competition. In it, former Israeli soldiers admitted that a massacre took place in 1948 at Tantura. One former combat soldier stated: "They silenced it. The victims of the massacre were buried under what is today the Dor Beach parking lot, in an area measuring 35×4 meters." Adam Raz commented in Haaretz that there had been a public debate about the issue, with Yoav Gelber trying to discredit Katz's thesis, while Pappé defended the thesis. Raz said: "With the appearance of the testimony in Schwarz's film, the debate would seem to be decided."

== Political views and activism ==
In 1999, Pappé ran in the Knesset elections as seventh on the Communist Party-led Hadash list.

After years of political activism, Pappé supports economic and political boycotts of Israel, including an academic boycott. He believes boycotts are justified because "the Israeli occupation is a dynamic process and it becomes worse with each passing day. The AUT can choose to stand by and do nothing, or to be part of a historical movement similar to the anti-apartheid campaign against the white supremacist regime in South Africa. By choosing the latter, it can move us forward along the only remaining viable and non-violent road to saving both Palestinians and Israelis from an impending catastrophe."

If it is possible Israel's conduct in 1948 would be brought onto the stage of international tribunals; this may deliver a message even to the peace camp in Israel that reconciliation entails recognition of war crimes and collective atrocities. This cannot be done from within, as any reference in the Israeli press to expulsion, massacre or destruction in 1948 is usually denied and attributed to self hate and service to the enemy in times of war. This reaction encompasses academia, the media and educational system, as well as political circles.

As a result, then University of Haifa President Aaron Ben-Ze'ev called on Pappé to resign, saying: "it is fitting for someone who calls for a boycott of his university to apply the boycott himself." He said that Pappé would not be ostracized, since that would undermine academic freedom, but he should leave voluntarily. In the same year, Pappé initiated the annual Israeli Right of Return Conferences, which called for the unconditional right of return of the Palestinian refugees who were expelled in 1948. According to Pappé, while national movements deserve a state of their own, this principle does not extend to Jews, Muslims, Buddhists or Christians because they constitute a religious group rather than a nation. However, it could possibly apply to Zionists, as a national movement, if that movement did not infringe upon the rights of Palestinians.

In August 2015, Pappé was a signatory to a letter criticising The Jewish Chronicle's reporting of Jeremy Corbyn's association with alleged antisemites. In 2023, he described Israel as committing an "incremental genocide" of the Palestinian people. During the Gaza war, Pappé reaffirmed his opposition to Zionism, writing that "this violence is not a new phenomenon," and called for a "de-zionised, liberated and democratic Palestine from the river to the sea." He called for the Israeli government to conduct a prisoner exchange in order to release the hostages held by Hamas. Pappé's comments following the October 7 attacks in 2023 drew criticism from The Telegraph and parts of the student body at the University of Exeter, namely in stating he had admiration for Hamas militants' courage and ability to take over military bases in Israel and rejected the claim that Hamas is a terrorist organisation, although he condemned the attack. In May 2024, Pappé said he was questioned at Detroit airport for two hours by the Department of Homeland Security, and that his phone was copied.

In an op-ed to Al-Jazeera on 7 October 2024, Pappé argued that terms like "Iran-backed terrorist group Hamas" or "peace process", commonly used by Western and U.S. media, are misleading. He suggested that it is more accurate to speak of "Palestinian resistance" and the "decolonization of Palestine from the river to the sea." He mentioned that "mainstream academia and media still refuse to define the Zionist project as a colonial, or as it is referred to more accurately a settler-colonial project", and further contended that the original Zionist vision "of planting a European Jewish state at the heart of the Arab world through the dispossession of the Palestinians was illogical, immoral and impractical from the onset."

== Critical assessment ==
Israeli scholar Emmanuel Sivan, reviewing Pappé's 2003 political biography of the al-Husayni family, praised the book's treatment of the development of Palestinian nationalism and that of Haj Amin's exile in Germany, but criticised the view taken on the mufti's visit to the German consul and the scant attention given to Faisal Husseini.

In a review for Arab Studies Quarterly, Seif Da'Na described Pappé's 2006 book The Ethnic Cleansing of Palestine as a "highly documented narrative of the events" surrounding the Nakba and an example of "serious scholarship that only a virtuoso historiographer could produce". Arab Studies Quarterly also praised Pappé's 2017 book Ten Myths About Israel, describing it as "well-documented" and an "invaluable and courageous contribution" from an "insightful" historian. In a review for the journal Global Governance, Rashmi Singh praised Pappé's 2014 book The Idea of Israel as a "courageous and unflinching study of the role of Zionism in the creation of [...] the state of Israel". However, Singh did feel that the book assumes the reader has prior knowledge of the Arab-Israeli conflict and thus may be difficult to follow for "those who are not conversant with the facts".

Uri Ram, a professor of Ben-Gurion University, reviewed The Ethnic Cleansing of Palestine for the Middle East Journal and described the book as "a most important and daring book that challenges head-on Israeli historiography and collective memory and even more importantly Israeli conscience". The same book was reviewed by Hugh Steadman for the New Zealand International Review, in which he called Pappé's book the "definitive record of the caesarean operation by which the state of Israel was born" and "essential reading" for those who wish to see a "peaceful and internationally acceptable Middle Eastern home for Jewish people".

Those critical of his work include Benny Morris, Efraim Karsh, and activist Herbert London as well as professors Daniel Gutwein and Yossi Ben-Artzi from Haifa University. Morris, in particular, described some of Pappé's writing as "complete fabrication" due to alleged factual errors, and called him "at best...one of the world's sloppiest historians; at worst, one of the most dishonest". Pappé has replied to this criticism, writing, "Benny Morris tells his readers [...] that he and I walked a stretch of road together as ‘revisionist historians’. This is how an article begins with a factual mistake; an article which is meant to show that my works are a fabrication. This is a falsification of history as I could not be a partner to a person who had already in 1988 held views I found morally unacceptable." Such views included "abominable racist views about the Arabs in general and the Palestinians in particular".

According to Morris, "Pappé is a proud postmodernist. He believes that there is no such thing as historical truth, only a collection of narratives as numerous as the participants in any given event or process; and each narrative, each perspective, is as valid and legitimate, as true, as the next. Moreover, every narrative is inherently political and, consciously or not, serves political ends. Each historian is justified in shaping his narrative to promote particular political purposes." In response, Pappé stated that all historians are necessarily "subjective human beings striving to tell their own version of the past". After raising doubts on Morris' factual claims, Pappé asserted his own emphasis on "moral issues", "not the natural human follies of professional historians" such as the possible factual follies by Morris.

In August 2021, following the translation of his book The Ethnic Cleansing of Palestine into Hebrew, the historian Adam Raz published a review in Haaretz criticizing Pappé as a historian.

== Books ==
- Pappé, Ilan (18 September 2025). Israel on the Brink: Eight Steps for a Better Future. London: Oneworld Publications. ISBN 9781836430636.
- Pappé, Ilan (3 October 2024). A Very Short History of the Israel-Palestine Conflict. London: Oneworld Publications. ISBN 9780861549719.
- Pappé, Ilan (2024). Lobbying for Zionism on Both Sides of the Atlantic. London: Oneworld Publications. ISBN 9780861544028. See also The Israel Lobby Is Real. This Is How It Works | Aaron Bastani meets Ilan Pappé, Youtube, 2024 Jun 16, and The Israel Lobby with John Mearsheimer and Stephen Walt | Outside the Box Podcast, Youtube, 2024 Apr 17.
- The Biggest Prison on Earth: A History of the Occupied Territories. London: Oneworld Publications. 2017. ISBN 978-1-85168-587-5. Archived from the original on 14 October 2023.
- Ten Myths About Israel. New York: Verso. 2017. ISBN 9781786630193
- (with Noam Chomsky) On Palestine. Chicago: Haymarket Books. 2015. ISBN 978-1-60846-470-8.
- The Idea of Israel: A History of Power and Knowledge. New York: Verso. 2014.
- "The Boycott Will Work: An Israeli Perspective" in Audrea Lim (ed.) The Case for Sanctions Against Israel. London & Brooklyn, NY: Verso. 2012.
- The Forgotten Palestinians: A History of the Palestinians in Israel. New Haven: Yale University Press. 2011.
- (with Noam Chomsky) Gaza in Crisis: Reflections on Israel's War Against the Palestinians (Hamish Hamilton, 2010). ISBN 978-0-241-14506-7
- Out of the Frame: The Struggle for Academic Freedom in Israel. London: Pluto Press. 2010.
- The Rise and Fall of a Palestinian Dynasty: The Husaynis, 1700–1948. London: Saqi Books. 2010.
- The Ethnic Cleansing of Palestine (London and New York: Oneworld, 2006). ISBN 1-85168-467-0
- The Modern Middle East (London and New York: Routledge, 2005). ISBN 0-415-21409-2
- A History of Modern Palestine: One Land, Two Peoples (Cambridge University Press, 2004), ISBN 0-521-55632-5
- (With Jamil Hilal). Parlare Con il Nemico, Narrazioni palestinesi e israeliane a confronto (Milano: Bollati Boringhieri, 2004).
- The Aristocracy: The Husaynis; A Political Biography (Jerusalem: Mossad Byalik, (Hebrew), 2003).
- The Israel-Palestine Question (London and New York: Routledge, 1999; 2006). ISBN 0-415-16948-8
- (with M. Maoz). History From Within: Politics and Ideas in Middle East (London and New York: Tauris, 1997). ISBN 1-86064-012-5
- (with J. Nevo). Jordan in the Middle East 1948–1988: The Making of a Pivotal State (London: Frank Cass, 1994). ISBN 0-7146-3454-9
- The Making of the Arab-Israeli Conflict, 1947–1951 (London and New York: I.B. Tauris, 1992; 1994). ISBN 1-85043-819-6
- Britain and the Arab-Israeli Conflict, 1948–1951 (London: St. Antony's College Series, Macmillan Press; New York: St. Martin's Press, 1988). ISBN 0-312-01573-9

== See also ==
- Avi Shlaim
