= Christian Zionism =

Political and religious ideology

Christian Zionism is a religious and political movement that supports a Jewish return to, or continued national presence in, the Land of Israel and, in its modern forms, support for the State of Israel. Many Christian Zionists understand the return of Jews to the land and the establishment of Israel as fulfilments of biblical prophecy or of God's continuing covenant with the Jewish people. In some traditions this restoration forms part of an eschatological scheme involving the Second Coming and the eventual conversion of Jews to Christianity. Christian Zionism is not, however, confined to that theology: Christian support for Zionism has also come from non-dispensationalist Protestants and, before 1948, from liberal and mainline Protestants whose support was often based on concern for persecuted Jews and Christian–Jewish reconciliation rather than biblical prophecy.

Ideas about a future Jewish restoration to Palestine developed among Protestants well before modern political Zionism. They appeared among English Puritans and other Reformed Christians from the late 16th and 17th centuries and became part of a wider Protestant restorationist tradition. By the 19th century such ideas had entered British and American public life. Lord Shaftesbury promoted Jewish restoration in British political circles, while American advocates included the theologian George Bush and, later, William Eugene Blackstone, whose 1891 Blackstone Memorial urged President Benjamin Harrison to support a Jewish homeland in Palestine. William Hechler subsequently became an early Christian supporter and associate of Theodor Herzl. Evangelical restorationism also influenced British discussion of Palestine; historian Anita Shapira writes that English evangelical Protestants helped transmit the idea of Jewish return to Jewish circles in the 19th century. The 19th-century rise of dispensationalism, associated with John Nelson Darby, gave restorationism an influential new theological framework, but Christian advocacy for Jewish restoration preceded dispensationalism and was never limited to it.

In the decades before the establishment of Israel, liberal and mainline Protestants were among the most active American Christian supporters of Zionism. During and after the Holocaust, organizations that eventually formed the American Christian Palestine Committee lobbied for the creation of a Jewish state. After 1948, and particularly after the Six-Day War of 1967, the center of American Christian Zionism shifted increasingly toward evangelical Protestantism. Political figures of the Christian right such as Jerry Falwell and Pat Robertson also made support for Israel a prominent part of their activism. The movement now includes large organizations such as Christians United for Israel and has adherents both inside and outside the United States. Christian Zionist gatherings in Israel have likewise presented the modern return of Jews and the establishment of Israel as fulfilments of biblical prophecy.

Christian Zionism has also drawn sustained criticism from other Christians. Eastern Orthodox, Catholic, and Protestant critics have rejected its interpretation of biblical promises to Israel or argued that those promises should not be applied directly to the modern State of Israel. The Catholic Church historically opposed a theological endorsement of Zionism and was particularly concerned with the status of Christian holy places, although some modern Catholic theologians have argued for forms of Christian Zionism. Protestant churches and organizations have criticized the movement on theological and political grounds, including its effects on Palestinians, Middle Eastern Christians, interfaith relations, and efforts toward peace in the Israeli–Palestinian conflict. Christian Zionists, in turn, argue that biblical references to Israel continue to concern the Jewish people rather than having been wholly transferred to the Christian Church.

== History before the 20th century ==
=== Origins in Calvinistic millennialism ===
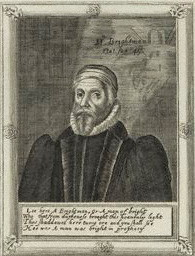
Thomas Brightman, an English Puritan, published Shall They Return to Jerusalem Again? in 1615. This was one of the earliest Restorationist works.

The first wave of Protestant leaders, including Martin Luther and John Calvin, did not mention any special eschatological views which included a return of the Jews to Palestine (converted to Christianity or otherwise). More generally, Luther had hoped that the Jews would convert to his brand of Christianity once he had broken with the Catholic Church, but later he harshly denounced Jews. Like the Catholic Church and the Eastern Orthodox Church, the Lutheran Church and the Reformed Church saw the Christian Church as being the "spiritual Israel" and considered faithful Christians the exclusive "people of God"—those with whom God had entered into a covenant through Jesus Christ—assigning no special privileges or role to persons of Jewish descent. (In later times this has been called supersessionism.)

The Protestant focus on sola scriptura and the wider distribution of the Bible across Europe in the vernacular languages, however, allowed various radical protestants to interpret the scriptures in their own ways, in a manner which was not entirely reflective of either medieval Catholic tradition or the views of the Magisterial Protestant leaders themselves. Coupled with this was a general cultural Hebraising among more radical Protestants, as they saw the veneration of saints as idolatry and placed more focus on the biblical patriarchs and prophets of the Old Testament, often naming their children Abraham, Cain, Jeremiah, Zachary, Daniel, Sampson, and the like.

The anticipation of Jews returning to Palestine and making it their national homeland was first heard among self-identified Christian groups in the 1580s, particularly those aligned with Puritanism, a Reformed branch of Christianity that gave rise to the Congregationalist denomination. While Edward VI was the Tudor child-monarch of England, a Calvinist-leaning Regency de facto ruled. This allowed Continental Protestants such as Martin Bucer and Peter Martyr Vermigli to teach at the prestigious universities of Cambridge and Oxford. These two men forwarded a biblical exegesis which included an important role for the Jews, converted to Christianity, in the end times. (Note: According to Dick Wursten, a Doctor of Theology from Belgium, in his Clément Marot and Religion (2010), Bucer, a prominent Reformation Christian Hebraist, has been categorised as a Judaizer due to his reliance on later rabbinical Jewish commentators, external to Christian tradition, for his Commentary on the Psalter (1529). In particular, for his millennialism and views for a future Messianic Age, he drew from Abraham ibn Ezra and David Kimhi, from whom he shared their sense of "derek ha peshat" (an exegesis which prefers a literalist historicalism above allegorical or moral speculation) but syncretised this with Christian elements which would include a Jewish conversion in the end times. In addition to this he referenced the medieval Talmudic commentator Shlomo Yitzchai, also known as Rashi, though drew from him to a lesser extent than the others. Bucer owned a copy of the Mikraot Gedolot—a version of the Hebrew Bible preferred by medieval Rabbinic Judaism—and drew from it freely.) Early versions of the Bible endorsed by the English monarchy and the Anglican Church included the Great Bible and the Bishops' Bible. However, a number of English Puritans and Lowland Scots Presbyterians viewed these (along with Episcopalianism and the establishment "Protestantism of the princes"), in general, as too "Romanist." In response, a number of these Puritans and Presbyterians spent some time in Geneva in the 1560s under Calvin's successor Theodore Beza and developed a translation of the Bible called the Geneva Bible, which contained footnotes in reference to the Book of Romans, specifically claiming that the Jews would be converted to Christianity in the end times and reorientating attention to Palestine as a central theatre. This view came to be taken up strongly by English Puritans (such as Francis Kett, Edmund Bunny, Thomas Draxe, Thomas Brightman, Joseph Mede, William Perkins, Richard Sibbes, Thomas Goodwin, William Strong, William Bridge, Henry Finch, John Owen and Giles Fletcher), Lowland Scots Presbyterians (such as George Gillespie, Robert Baillie and Samuel Rutherford), and even some Continental Protestants (such as Oliger Paulli, Isaac Vossius, Hugo Grotius, Gerhard Vossius and David Blondel).

The Puritans, once a "fringe" faction, came to power under Oliver Cromwell during the Commonwealth. Several of his closest advisors held Philo-Semitic millennialist religious views.

During the late Tudor and early Stuart period, these Puritans remained outsiders in England and bitterly opposed the Laudian-dominated Anglican Church (though the Presbyterians, who held very similar views, had established the Church of Scotland as the largest "Kirk" in Scotland). With the English Civil War, the Puritans filled the ranks of the Parliamentarians and the New Model Army. Under the leadership of Oliver Cromwell they were victorious, executed Charles I of England and gained complete state power, establishing the Commonwealth of England between 1649 and 1660. The Philo-Semitic millennialist undercurrent came to have a direct influence on politics. A number of Cromwell's close advisors, such as John Dury, John Sadler and Hugh Peter, came into contact with Dutch-based Jews such as Menasseh ben Israel and advocated Jewish resettlement in England (they had been banned from the country since the 13th century). Sadler, Cromwell's secretary, even argued that the British were one of the Lost Tribes of Israel in his pamphlet The Rights of the Kingdom (1649) and thus kindred to the Jews, initiating British Israelism. Other Puritans such as Jeremiah Burroughs, Peter Bulkley, John Fenwicke and John Cotton, some of whom lived in the Massachusetts Bay Colony, saw Jewish re-entry to England as a step on the path to their eventual return to Palestine (all tied up within a millennialist eschatology, which would hasten the Second Coming of Jesus Christ and thus the final judgement). Johanna and Ebenezer Cartwright, two Baptists who had spent time in Amsterdam, held the same view and issued the original petition to Thomas Fairfax's Council of War in January 1649 for Jewish readmission: the petition hoped, "That this Nation of England, with the inhabitants of the Netherlands, shall be the first and the readiest to transport Israel's sons and daughters on their ships to the land promised to their forefathers, Abraham, Isaac, and Jacob for an everlasting inheritance." Their de facto toleration in England was informally achieved by 1655 to 1656 and was not rolled back after the Restoration.

A prominent French-born figure Isaac La Peyrère, who was nominally a Huguenot, but may have came from a Portuguese New Christian (converted Sephardic Jewish) family was also a significant 17th century progenitor, with influence on both sides of the English Channel. La Peyrère in his millennialist work Du rappel des juifs (1643) wrote about a Jewish return to Palestine, predicted the building of the Third Temple and Jerusalem playing the most powerful role in world governance: all working towards the Second Coming. La Peyrère closely followed the developments of Oliver Cromwell's Dissenter regime and dreamed of overthrowing Louis XIV of France and replacing him with the Prince of Condé (who he worked for as a secretary) as part of a millennialist proto-Zionist messianic project. After the publication of La Peyrère's book the Amsterdam-based Menasseh Ben Israel informed his friend, Petrus Serrarius (a close associate of John Dury), about the importance of the theories, showing an early interplay between 17th century Jewish and Protestant proto-Zionism. Other Continental Protestant millennialists enthused by La Peyrère's theories were the Germans Abraham von Franckenberg (a student of the Kabbalah) and Paul Felgenhauer. Menasseh Ben Israel himself would author The Hope of Israel in 1652. Serrarius ended up being the main supporter among Protestants in Amsterdam of the message that Sabbatai Zevi was the Messiah, as proclaimed by Nathan of Gaza (his followers, the Sabbateans, were based in the Ottoman Empire but he had significant support throughout the Jewish diaspora).

Although removed from power in England itself, the millennialist Puritans who had moved to New England continued to have a deeper cultural legacy in society. As well as John Cotton, Increase Mather, one of the early Presidents of Harvard College was a strong proponent of the restoration of the Jews to Palestine. An author of numerous works, his most notable in this regard was The Mystery of Israel's Salvation (1669). Roger Williams, the Puritan proponent of religious liberty (including for Jews) in the Colony of Rhode Island that he founded has been citied as a proto-Zionist in speeches by later Jewish Zionist leaders such as Stephen S. Wise, due to his comment that "I have longed after some trading with the Jews themselves, for whose hard measure I fear the nations and England have yet a score to pay." Some important 17th-century philosophers who acted a bridge between the millennialist sectarians of their day and the approaching Age of the Enlightenment with its Scientific Revolution either held views associated with premillennial restorationists, or moved closely in their circles: this applies particularly to Sir Isaac Newton and Baruch Spinoza. Newton especially, who held Radical Reformation views in terms of religion and also dabbled in the occult (including the Kabbalah) predicted a Jewish return to Palestine, with the rebuilding of Jerusalem in the late 19th century and the erection of the Third Temple in the 20th or 21st century, leading to the end of the world no later than 2060. Much of these private writings were embarrassing to his supporters who sought to uphold him as a man of reason and science against Leibniz and while the University of Cambridge inherited his scientific papers, they refused to take these private ones. Many of these, collected by Abraham Yahuda, now rest in the National Library of Israel since 1967. Spinoza for his part, although Jewish himself, moved in circles in the Netherlands which included Petrus Serrarius, Henry Oldenburg and was even directly influenced by La Peyrère.

=== Pietism, Evangelicalism, and British foreign policy ===
With the rise of the Hanoverians to power in Britain and the ascent of the Enlightenment, much of the 18th century mainstream elite adopted Philhellenism, looking back to the culture and philosophies of the classical world for inspiration for the Georgian age, rather than adopting millennialist interpretations based on the Hebrew Old Testament (though Jews themselves enjoyed significant toleration in the British Empire). Although marginal at first, a religious underground was slowly growing from the 1730s which would eventually spout a second wave of Protestant Zionism and with it the birth of Evangelical Protestantism. This was precipitated in Germany by Philipp Spener's Pietism, a mystical and often millennialist take on Lutheranism, which prophesied the "conversion of the Jews and the fall of the Papacy as the prelude of the triumph of the Church." One of Spener's followers, Nicolaus Zinzendorf, spread this into the Moravian Church, linking the theory to Palestine, changing the Moravian liturgy to include a prayer "to restore the tribe of Judah in its time and bless its first fruits among us." John and Charles Wesley, early leaders in Methodism, inspired by the Pietists and Zinzendorf's Moravians, also promoted a Jewish return to Palestine with Charles Wesley even authoring a hymn dedicated to it. The Baptist, John Gill, who moved in similar circles to the Wesleys, authored works expressing similar views. By 1771, the Evangelical minister, John Eyre, founder of the Evangelical Magazine and among the original members of the London Missionary Society was promoting a more developed version of these views with his Observations upon Prophecies Relating to the Restoration of the Jews.

By the end of the 18th century, in the aftermath of the French Revolution and the National Assembly decreeing in December 1789 that non-Catholics were eligible for all civil and military positions, the Revolutionary government in France made a play for the allegiance of Jews, in competition with Britain. During the Egypt–Syria campaign of the French Revolutionary Wars, Bonaparte invited "all the Jews of Asia and Africa to gather under his flag in order to re-establish the ancient Jerusalem." Although Bonaparte himself was secular and the idea an early example of pragmatic Political Zionism, the Jacobin idea itself may have originated from Thomas Corbet (1773–1804), an Anglo-Irish Protestant émigrée who, as a member of the liberal-republican Society of United Irishmen, was an ally of the Jacobin-government, engaged in revolutionary activities against the British and served in the French Army. In February 1799, he authored a letter to the French Directory, then under the leadership of Napoleon's patron Paul Barras. In the letter he stated "I recommend you, Napoleon, to call on the Jewish people to join your conquest in the East, to your mission to conquer the land of Israel" saying, "Their riches do not console them for their hardships. They await with impatience the epoch of their re-establishment as a nation." Milka Levy-Rubin, a curator at the National Library of Israel, has attributed Corbet's motivation to a Protestant Zionism based on premillennialist themes.

In New England during the 18th century, Ezra Stiles, president of Yale College was a supporter of Jewish restoration and befriended Rabbi Raphael Chaim Yitzchak Karigal of Hebron in 1773 during his visit. Jonathan Edwards also anticipated a future return of Jews to their homeland. In 1808, Asa McFarland, a Presbyterian, voiced the opinion of many that the fall of the Ottoman Empire was imminent and would bring about Jewish restoration. One David Austin of New Haven spent his fortune building docks and inns from which the Jews could embark to the Holy Land. In 1825, Mordecai Manuel Noah, a Jew who wanted to found a national home for the Jews on Grand Island in New York as a way station on the way to the Holy Land, won widespread Christian backing for his project. Likewise, restorationist theology was among the inspirations for the first American missionary activity in the Middle East and for mapping the Holy Land.

Most early-19th-century British Restorationists, like Charles Simeon, were postmillennial in eschatology. With the rise of James Frere, James Haldane Stewart and Edward Irving a major shift in the 1820s towards premillennialism occurred, with a similar focus on advocacy for the restoration of the Jews to Israel. As the demise of the Ottoman Empire appeared to be approaching, the advocacy of restorationism increased.

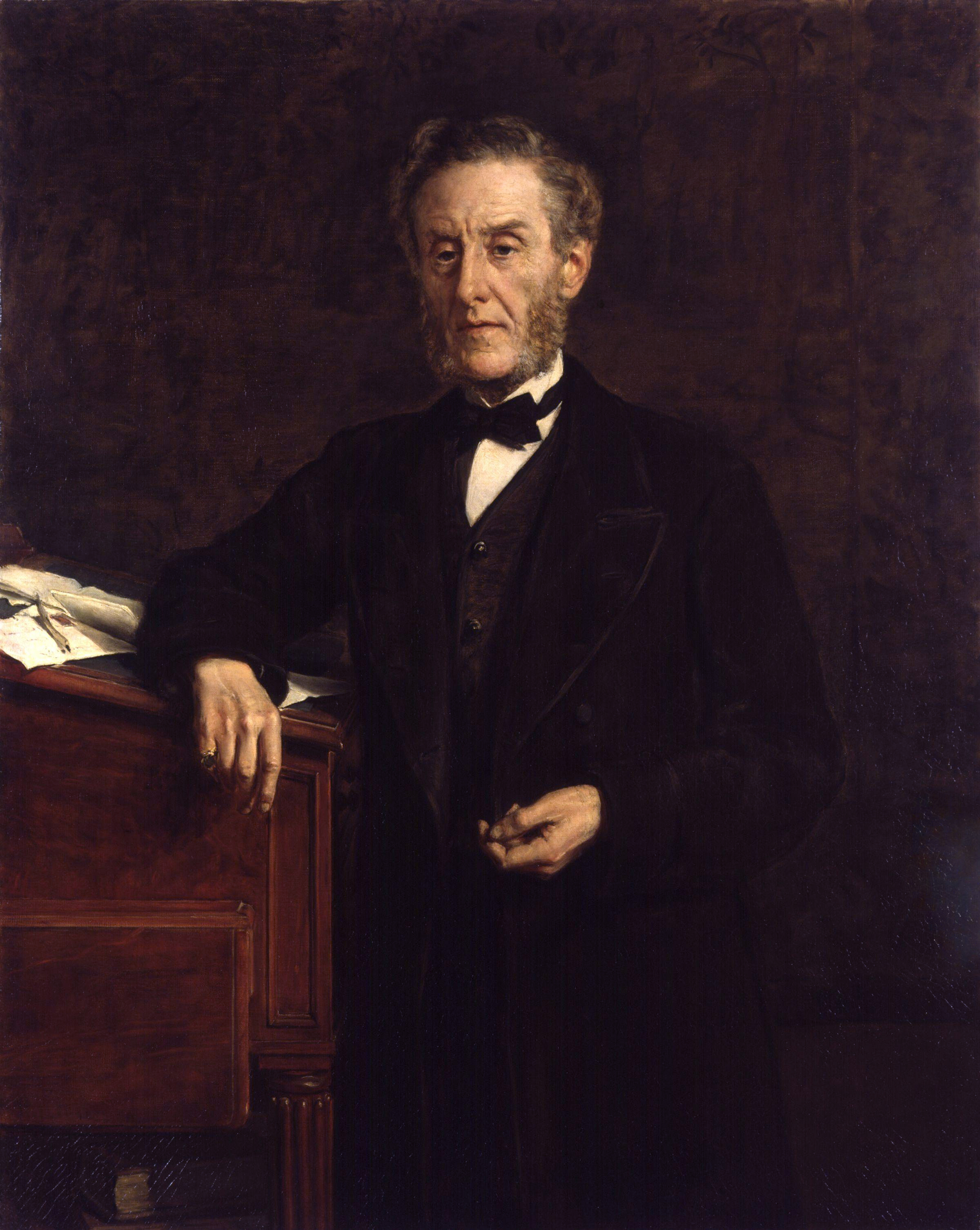
The Earl of Shaftesbury, influenced by Evangelical Anglicanism and the views of Edward Bickersteth was one of the first British politicians to seriously endorse a Jewish return to Ottoman Palestine as official policy.

The crumbling of the Ottoman Empire threatened the British route to India via the Suez Canal as well as sundry French, German and American economic interests. In 1831 the Ottomans were driven from the region of Syria (including Palestine) by an expansionist Egypt, in the First Turko-Egyptian War. Although Britain forced Muhammad Ali to withdraw to Egypt, the Levant was left for a brief time without a government. The ongoing weakness of the Ottoman Empire made some in the west consider the potential of a Jewish state in the Holy Land. A number of important figures within the British government advocated such a plan, including Charles Henry Churchill. Again during the lead-up to the Crimean War (1854), there was an opportunity for political rearrangements in the Near East. In July 1853, Anthony Ashley-Cooper, 7th Earl of Shaftesbury, who was President of the London Society for Promoting Christianity Amongst the Jews, wrote to Prime Minister Aberdeen urging Jewish restoration as a means of stabilizing the region.

At the same time, the visit of John Nelson Darby to the United States catalyzed a new movement. Darby was the founder of a theological framework known as dispensationalism. Darby’s dispensationalist theology is often claimed to be a significant awakener of American Christian Zionism. He first distinguished the hopes of the Jews and that of the church and gentiles in a series of 11 evening lectures in Geneva in 1840. His lectures were immediately published in French (L'Attente Actuelle de l'Eglise), English (1841), German and Dutch (1847) and so his teachings began their global journey. Some dispensationalists, like Arno Gabelein, whilst philo-semitic, opposed Zionism as a movement born in self-confidence and unbelief. While dispensationalism had considerable influence through the Scofield Reference Bible (first published by OUP, 1909), Christian lobbying for the restoration of the Jews preceded its publication by over a century, and many Christian Zionists and Christian Zionist organizations such as the International Christian Embassy Jerusalem do not subscribe to dispensationalism. Many non-dispensationalist Protestants were also strong advocates of a Jewish return to their homeland, Charles Spurgeon, both Horatius and Andrew Bonar, Robert Murray M'Chyene, and J. C. Ryle were among a number of proponents of both the importance and significance of a Jewish return to Israel. However, Spurgeon averred of dispensationalism: "It is a mercy that these absurdities are revealed one at a time, in order that we may be able to endure their stupidity without dying of amazement". In 1864, Spurgeon wrote:

We look forward, then, for these two things. I am not going to theorize upon which of them will come first — whether they shall be restored first, and converted afterwards — or converted first and then restored. They are to be restored and they are to be converted, too.

Darby’s dispensationalism was expressed at the Niagara Bible Conference in 1878, which issued a 14-point proclamation (relying on Luke 12:35–40, 17:26–30, 18:8 Acts 15:14–17, 2 Thessalonians 2:3–8, 2 Timothy 3:1–5, and Titus 1:11–15), including:

that the Lord Jesus will come in person to introduce the millennial age, when Israel shall be restored to their own land, and the earth shall be full of the knowledge of the Lord; and that this personal and premillennial advent is the blessed hope set before us in the Gospel for which we should be constantly looking.

Late-19th-century non-messianic restorationism was largely driven by concern over the fate of the Jews of the Russian Empire, beset by poverty and by deadly, government-inspired pogroms. It was widely accepted that western nations did not wish to receive Jewish immigrants. Restorationism was a way for charitable individuals to assist oppressed Jews without actually accepting them as neighbors and fellow-citizens. In this, Restorationism was not unlike the efforts of the American Colonization Society to send blacks to Liberia and the efforts of British abolitionists to create Sierra Leone. Winston Churchill endorsed Restoration because he recognized that Jews fleeing Russian pogroms required a refuge, and preferred Palestine for sentimental reasons.

=== In the United States ===
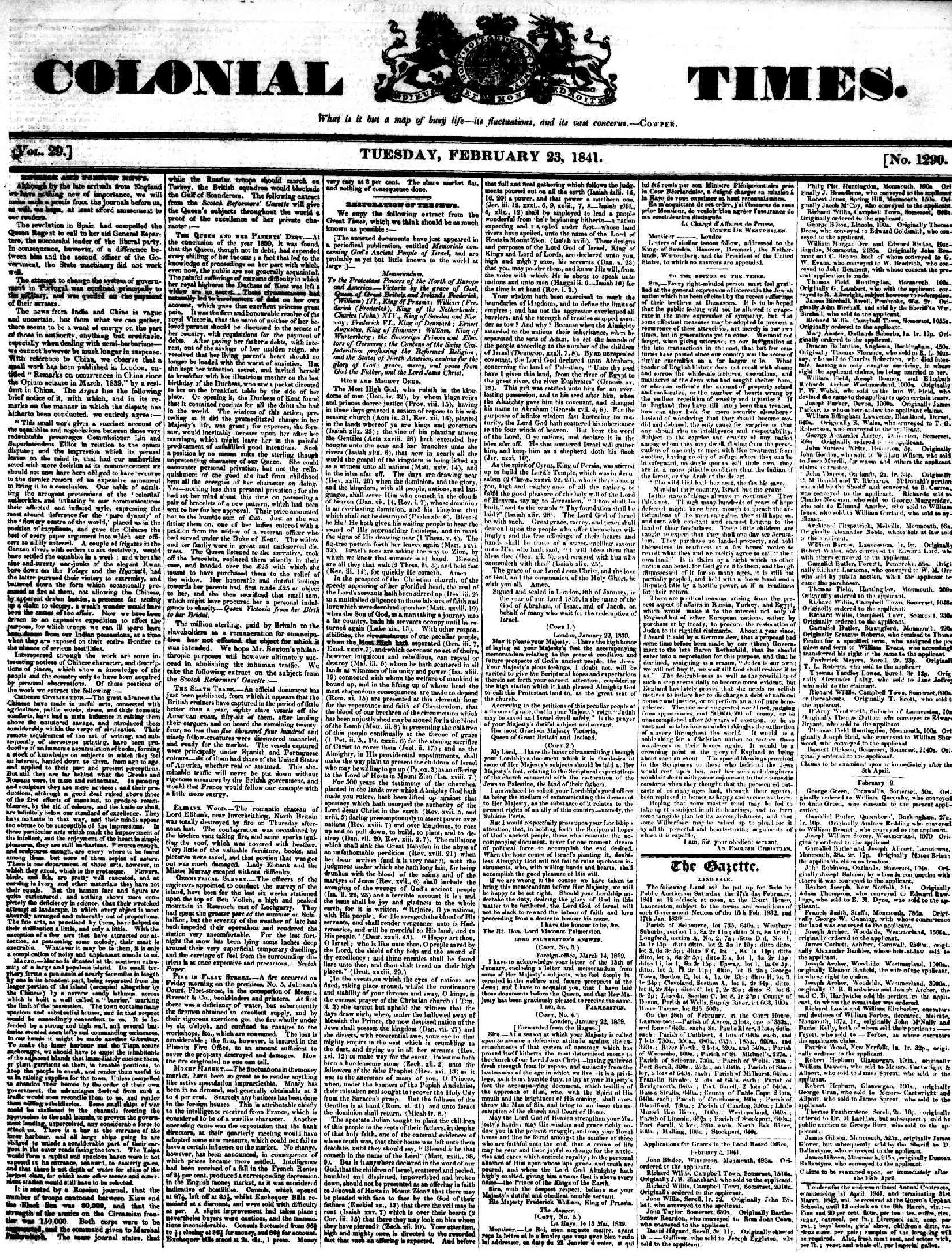
"Memorandum to the Protestant Powers of the North of Europe and America", Colonial Times, Hobart, Australia, 1841

In 1818, President John Adams wrote, "I really wish the Jews again in Judea an independent nation", and believed that they would gradually become Unitarian Christians.

In 1844, George Bush, a professor of Hebrew at New York University and the cousin of an ancestor of the Presidents Bush, published a book titled The Valley of Vision; or, The Dry Bones of Israel Revived. In it he denounced "the thralldom and oppression which has so long ground them (the Jews) to the dust," and called for "elevating" the Jews "to a rank of honorable repute among the nations of the earth" by allowing restoring the Jews to the land of Israel where the bulk would be converted to Christianity. This, according to Bush, would benefit not only the Jews, but all of mankind, forming a "link of communication" between humanity and God. "It will blaze in notoriety ...". "It will flash a splendid demonstration upon all kindreds and tongues of the truth."

Herman Melville expressed the idea in a poem, "Clarel; A Poem and Pilgrimage in the Holy Land":

the Hebrew seers announce in time
the return of Judah to her prime;
Some Christians deemed it then at hand
Here was an object. Up and On.
With seed and tillage help renew –
Help reinstate the Holy Land

The tycoon William Eugene Blackstone was inspired by the conference to publish the book Jesus is Coming, which took up the restorationist cause. His book was translated and published in Yiddish. On November 24–25, 1890, Blackstone organized the Conference on the Past, Present and Future of Israel at the First Methodist Episcopal Church in Chicago where participants included leaders of many Christian communities. Resolutions of sympathy for the oppressed Jews living in Russia were passed, but Blackstone was convinced that such resolutions—even though passed by prominent men—were insufficient. He advocated strongly for the resettlement of Jewish people in Palestine. In 1891 he lobbied President Benjamin Harrison for the restoration of the Jews, in a petition signed by 413 prominent Americans, that became known as the Blackstone Memorial. The names included the US Chief Justice, Speaker of the House of Representatives, the Chair of the House Foreign Relations Committee, and several other congressmen, Rockefeller, Morgan and famous industrialists. It read, in part: "Why shall not the powers which under the treaty of Berlin, in 1878, gave Bulgaria to the Bulgarians and Servia to the Servians now give Palestine back to the Jews? ... These provinces, as well as Romania, Montenegro, and Greece, were wrested from the Turks and given to their natural owners. Does not Palestine as rightfully belong to the Jews?"

=== In Great Britain ===
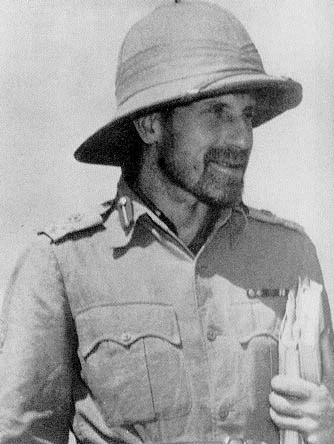
By the time of Mandate Palestine, the British struggled to balance sympathies for Jews and Arabs. Some, such as Orde Wingate, fought alongside the Haganah as part of the Special Night Squads.

British Reformationists had written about the restoration of the Jews as early as the 16th century, and the idea had strong support among Puritans. While Jewish nationalism in the early 19th century was largely met with hostility from British Jews, ideas favoring the restoration of the Jews in Palestine or the Land of Israel entered the British public discourse in the 1830s. Not all such attitudes were favorable towards the Jews; they were shaped in part by a variety of Protestant beliefs, or by a streak of philo-Semitism among the classically educated British elite.

At the urging of Lord Shaftesbury, Britain established a consulate in Jerusalem in 1838, the first diplomatic appointment to Palestine.

In 1839, the Church of Scotland sent Andrew Bonar, Robert Murray M'Cheyne, Alexander Black and Alexander Keith on a mission to report on the condition of the Jews in Palestine. Their report was widely published. They traveled through France, Greece, and Egypt, and from Egypt, overland to Gaza. On the way home they visited Syria, the Austrian Empire and some of the German states. They sought out Jewish communities and inquired about their readiness to accept Christ, and separately, their preparedness to return to Israel as prophesied in the Bible. Alexander Keith recounted the journey in his 1844 book The Land of Israel According to the Covenant with Abraham, with Isaac, and with Jacob. It was also in that book that Keith used the slogan that became popular with other Christian Restorationists, a land without a people for a people without a land. In 1844 he revisited Palestine with his son, George Skene Keith (1819–1910), who was the first person to photograph the land.

An important, though often neglected, figure in British support of the restoration of the Jews was William Hechler (1845–1931), an English clergyman of German descent who was Chaplain of the British Embassy in Vienna and became a close friend of Theodor Herzl. Hechler was instrumental in aiding Herzl through his diplomatic activities, and may, in that sense, be called the founder of modern Christian Zionism. When it came to mark the twenty-fifth anniversary of Herzl's death, the editors of the English-language memorial volume said that William Hechler was "not only the first, but the most constant and the most indefatigable of Herzl's followers".

==== Balfour Declaration ====
On 2 November 1917, UK Home Secretary Arthur Balfour sent a letter to Lord Walter Rothschild. This letter, known as the Balfour Declaration, famously stated that "His Majesty's Government view with favour the establishment in Palestine of a national home for the Jewish people." As noted by Philip Alexander, "A crucial ingredient in Balfour's Zionism [may have been] his Christian belief or, to put it a little more subtly, his Christian formation. The most persuasive advocate of this thesis is the Canadian historian Donald Lewis in his 2010 monograph, The Origins of Christian Zionism, but it has been espoused by a number of other scholars as well." Both Lord Balfour and then British Prime Minister David Lloyd George were influenced by Christian Zionism. (Note: Donald E. Wagner, Walter T. Davis (2014). Zionism and the Quest for Justice in the Holy Land', Chapter Six: The Mainline Protestant Churches and the Holy Land by Donald E. Wagner. Quotation: "both Balfour and his prime minister David Lloyd-George were predisposed to the Zionists' arguments for at least two reasons. First and foremost was their political goal, which was essentially the expansion of British rule from the Levant to the “Jewel in the Crown” of the empire—India. However, another motivation was in play, and it is one rarely discussed by historians and political analysts. Both Balfour and Lloyd-George were products of fundamentalist Christian Zionism and as such were predisposed to support Zionism based on their premillennial dispensationalist reading of the Holy Scriptures. Both politicians are examples of how Christian Zionism can orient one to embrace the Zionist narrative for both political and theological reasons. His references to the “age-long traditions” and “future hopes of far profounder import” in the above quotation are evidence of Balfour’s blend of evangelical Christian Zionism with his colonialist political vision.")

== Between World War I and the 1948 Palestine War ==
=== In the United States ===
In the decades leading up to the 1948 Palestine war and establishment of the State of Israel in 1948, the most prominent and politically active American Christian supporters of Zionism were liberal and mainline Protestants whose support for the movement was often unrelated to their interpretation of the Bible. These Christian supporters of Zionism viewed Palestine as a needed safe haven for Jews who were fleeing from intensifying persecution in Europe and they frequently believed that their support of the movement was part of a broader effort at interfaith rapprochement. The Pro-Palestine Federation, a Christian pro-Zionist organization which was founded in 1930, called for the promotion of "goodwill and esteem between Jews and non-Jews" and it also called for the British government to adhere to the terms of its Mandate for Palestine, which pledged support for the establishment of a Jewish national home.

Amidst World War II and their growing awareness of the Holocaust, American Jewish Zionists helped coordinate the establishment of two non-Jewish Zionist organizations, the American Palestine Committee and the Christian Council on Palestine, which were later merged into the American Christian Palestine Committee (ACPC). The ACPC, which was composed largely of liberal and mainline Protestants, became the leading American Christian lobby in support of the creation of a Jewish state in Palestine. After the establishment of Israel in 1948, the ACPC continued its lobbying efforts. For instance, it coordinated opposition to the United Nations' efforts to internationalize the city of Jerusalem, which was divided between Israel and Transjordan in the 1948 War.

During these years, dispensational premillennialism grew in popularity among conservative American Protestants. Many dispensationalists viewed the Zionist movement as at least a partial fulfillment of biblical prophecy or they viewed it as a modern fulfillment of God's covenantal promises to the Jewish people. In the 1930s, Southern Baptist missionary Jacob Gartenhaus, himself a convert from Judaism, argued that "Zionism is going to win whether anybody likes it or not...To oppose it is to oppose God's plan." But for the most part, such beliefs did not translate into political action on behalf of the movement in this era. One slight exception was J. Frank Norris, a fundamentalist Baptist who split time between pulpits in Fort Worth, Texas, and Detroit, Michigan. While Norris did not organize lobbying efforts in the way that the ACPC did, he did preach to his followers that it was their Christian duty to support the Zionist cause and wrote President Truman in support of Zionist claims to Palestine in 1947 and 1948. Norris also loosely coordinated with the ACPC, at times publishing their materials in his periodical, The Fundamentalist.

== After the founding of the State of Israel ==
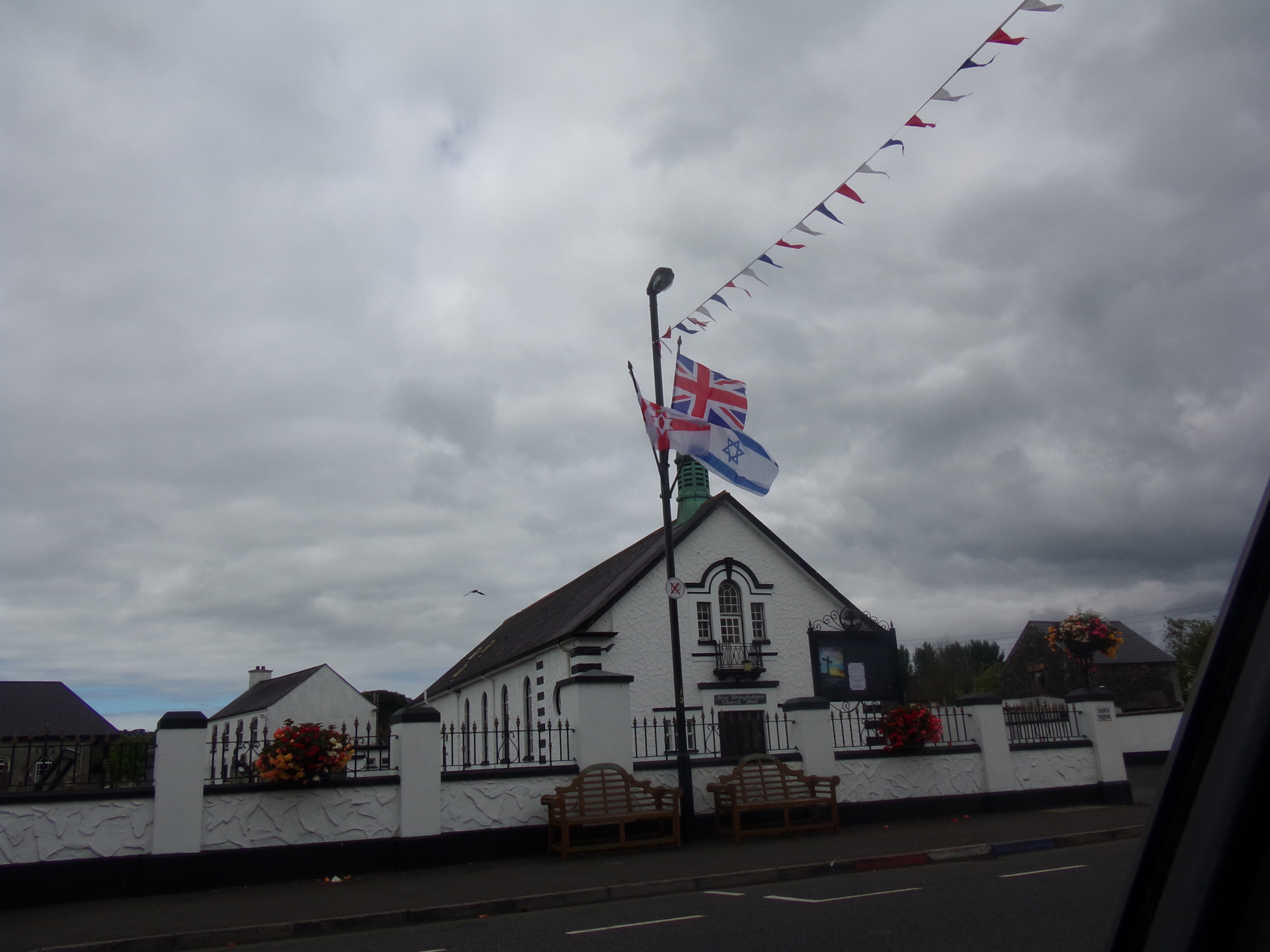
The Flag of Israel, flying alongside the Union Flag and the Ulster Banner. In the Protestant Unionist community of Northern Ireland, sympathy for Israel is frequently expressed by communal flag-flying.

=== In the United States ===
In the decades since the establishment of Israel, and especially since the 1967 Six-Day War, the most prominent American Christian supporters of Israel have come from the evangelical wing of American Protestantism. American evangelicalism itself underwent significant changes in the years surrounding Israel's birth, as a "new" evangelicalism led by figures like Billy Graham emerged from Protestantism and came to cultural prominence. It was among these new evangelicals that the contemporary movement that most commonly associated with the term "Christian Zionism" originated.

Many new evangelicals adhered to dispensationalism or at least, they adhered to beliefs which were inspired by it—most especially, they adhered to the dispensationalist understanding that Jews remained in a special covenantal relationship with God. Most important to the development of Christian Zionism as a movement, though, was the fact that American evangelical leaders began to build relationships with American and Israeli Jews and they also began to build institutional connections with Jewish organizations and the Israeli government itself. Crucial to the building of these relationships was a motivated coterie of American evangelicals who resided in Israel, most notably, the founder of the American Institute of Holy Land Studies, G. Douglas Young. Through his institute, Young worked to convince American Christians that it was their biblical duty to support the Jewish people and the Jewish state. He also worked as a go-between for Jewish organizations and Israeli government agencies which were seeking to build relationships with American evangelicals. Such activism provided the basis for the development of Christian Zionism as a movement.

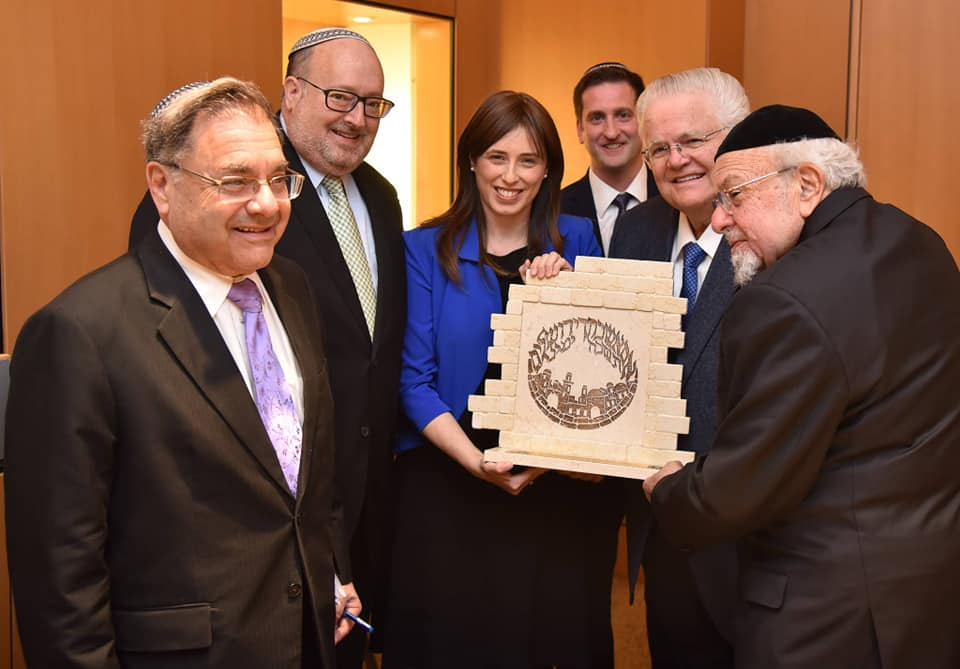
Christian Zionist Pastor John Hagee with Rabbi Shlomo Riskin and Israel's Deputy Foreign Minister Tzipi Hotovely in November 2018

Such activism, it should be noted, was in many ways distinct from the prophetic speculation about the State of Israel that exploded after the 1967 Six-Day War (even as it had somewhat common theological and hermeneutical antecedents). This activism includes the wildly popular writings of the American dispensationalist evangelical writer Hal Lindsey, which sought to fit Israel into a dispensationalist end-time narrative. In The Late Great Planet Earth, for example, Lindsey anticipated that, per Ezekiel 39:6–8, Jews would fight off a "Russian" invasion before realizing their miraculous deliverance and converting to Christianity. Their lives would be spared the great fire that God will put upon Russia and people of the "coastlands." And, per Zechariah 13:8–9, one third of Jews alive who have converted will be spared. Lindsay has been critiqued for highly specific, failed predictions even by those who share his eschatology, like John MacArthur.

Examples of Protestant leaders who combined political conservatism with Christian Zionism are Jerry Falwell and Pat Robertson, leading figures on the Christian Right in the 1980s and 1990s. In 1981, Falwell said: "To stand against Israel is to stand against God. We believe that history and scripture prove that God deals with nations in relation to how they deal with Israel." They cite part of the blessing of Isaac at Genesis 27:29, "Those who curse you will be cursed, and those who bless you will be blessed."

Martin Luther King Jr. has also been cited as a Christian supporter of Israel and Zionism.

Tens of millions of Americans belong to Evangelical churches that strongly support Israel for religious reasons, and there are tens of millions more Christians who identify as Christian Zionists outside the United States.

The largest Zionist organization is Christians United for Israel, which has 10 million members and is led by John Hagee.

According to a Pew Research survey in 2003, in the US more than 60% of the Evangelical Christians and about 50% of Blacks agreed that the existence of Israel fulfilled biblical prophecy. About 55% of poll respondents said that the Bible was the biggest influence for supporting Israel, 11 times the number of people who said church was the biggest influence.

A 2017 LifeWay poll conducted in United States found that 80% of evangelical Christians believed that the creation of Israel in 1948 was a fulfillment of biblical prophecy that would bring about Christ's return and more than 50% of Evangelical Christians believed that they support Israel because it is important for fulfilling the prophecy.

=== In Israel ===
The government of Israel has given official encouragement to Christian Zionism, allowing the establishment of the International Christian Embassy Jerusalem in 1980. The embassy has raised funds to help finance Jewish immigration to Israel from the former Soviet Union, and has assisted Zionist groups in establishing Jewish settlements in the West Bank.

The Third International Christian Zionist Congress, held in Jerusalem in February 1996, issued a proclamation which said:

God the Father, Almighty, chose the ancient nation and people of Israel, the descendants of Abraham, Isaac and Jacob, to reveal His plan of redemption for the world. They remain elect of God, and without the Jewish nation His redemptive purposes for the world will not be completed.

Jesus of Nazareth is the Messiah and has promised to return to Jerusalem, to Israel and to the world.

It is reprehensible that generations of Jewish peoples have been killed and persecuted in the name of our Lord, and we challenge the Church to repent of any sins of commission or omission against them.

The modern Ingathering of the Jewish People to Eretz Israel and the rebirth of the nation of Israel are in fulfilment of biblical prophecies, as written in both Old and New Testaments.

Christian believers are instructed by Scripture to acknowledge the Hebraic roots of their faith and to actively assist and participate in the plan of God for the Ingathering of the Jewish People and the Restoration of the nation of Israel in our day.

Popular interest in Christian Zionism was given a boost around the year 2000 in the form of the Left Behind series of novels by Tim LaHaye and Jerry B. Jenkins. The novels are built around the prophetic role of Israel in the apocalyptic end times.

== Critical views within Christianity ==
=== General ===
For most Christians, the City of God (Psalm 46:4 (Septuagint: ΜΕ:5): "ἡ πόλις τοῦ Θεοῦ", romanized: "hē pólis toũ theoũ", lit. 'the city of God') has nothing to do with Jewish immigration to Israel and the ongoing Israeli–Palestinian conflict; instead, it predicts the sack of Rome (410) and it is cited in the teaching of Saint Augustine of Hippo. Eastern Orthodox Christians did not consider Zionism in any political form: "[The Eastern Orthodox Church [...] upheld a historic lack of emphasis on pilgrimage, insisting that the land of promise was not Palestine but the Kingdom of God. Thus, Patriarch Ignatius IV, head of the church in the Middle East, reiterated that the people were his concern in Jerusalem, not the stones." Not a worldly kingdom, not an earthly Jerusalem is sought after, but the focus is on the heavenly Jerusalem, the kingdom of the triune God:

At first you will see prayer as a ladder, then as a book which you read, and finally, as you advance further and further, you will see it as the heavenly Jerusalem, the city of the King of Hosts, Who is together with His Father — with Whom He is of one Essence — and with the venerable Holy Spirit.

— Hesychius of Jerusalem

Nor did traditional Catholic Christians support Christian Zionism.

Following the Gaza genocide, some Christians critical of Christian Zionism published a book in which they decried the arguments of those who justified Israel's assault or remained silent. For example in 2025, Tucker Carlson, an Episcopalian, criticized Christian Zionism, describing it as a "brain virus" and "Christian heresy".

=== Catholic Church ===
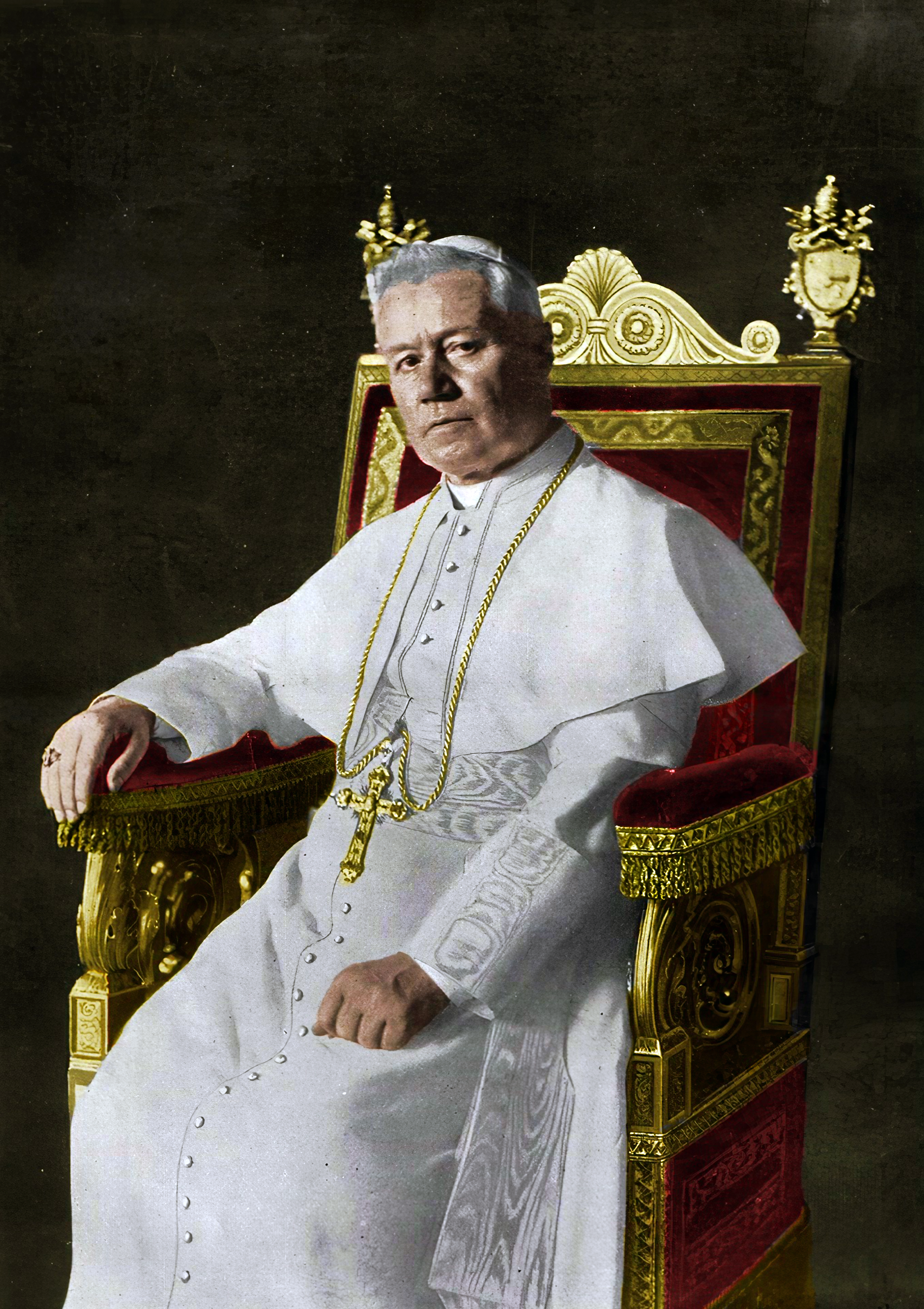
Pope Pius X: Theodor Herzl had an audience with Pope Pius X in 1904. The Pope explained that the Catholic Church could not theologically endorse Zionism and control of Holy Places in Jerusalem.

The Catholic Church—the largest branch of Christians in the world—does not endorse the theological premises underlying millennialist Restorationism as propounded by dispensationalists and it has generally inveighed against the prospect of Jewish governance over Holy Places in Palestine which it deems of importance to Christianity. Theodor Herzl, the secular Jewish founder of modern political Zionism, had an audience in the Vatican with Pope Pius X in 1904, arranged by the Austrian Count Berthold Dominik Lippay, seeking out the position of the Catholic Church on Herzl's prospective project for the establishment of a Jewish state in Palestine. Pope Pius X stated "We cannot prevent the Jews from going to Jerusalem—but we could never sanction it. The soil of Jerusalem, if it was not always sacred, has been sanctified by the life of Jesus Christ. As the head of the Church I cannot tell you anything different. The Jews have not recognized our Lord, therefore we cannot recognize the Jewish people." After Herzl explained that his reasoning behind the project for the creation of a Jewish state was not a religious statement, but interest in secular land for national independence, Pope Pius X replied "Does it have to be Gerusalemme?"

While it rejected a theological basis for Zionism outright, a major concern for the Holy See was the fate of the Holy Places which were associated with Jesus Christ if they should ever fall under the governance of such a state. By the mid-19th century, relations between the Vatican and Istanbul were fairly collegial; by that time, the Muslim Ottomans permitted the Vatican to work among the Arab Catholics in Palestine and they also permitted the Vatican to access the Holy Places quite freely so the status quo was already workable for them. Following the United Nations Partition Plan for Palestine, the Vatican advocated the position that Jerusalem should be treated as a separate "international city", as laid out in the encyclical Redemptoris nostri cruciatus. Until the Second Vatican Council, the Catholic Church was forthright in its international lobbying against Zionism (including the Catholic Church in the United States, because the United States had become Zionism's most powerful endorser). The State of Israel and the Holy See only established full diplomatic relations in 1993 and this was a recognition of political and civic reality, not a theological statement. In the 20th and 21st centuries, certain Catholic theologians such as André Villeneuve, Gary Anderson and Gavin D'Costa, have written in support of Christian Zionism, holding it to be a sign of God's fidelity.

=== Protestantism ===
Political Zionism has also been criticised by some Protestants:

[I]t is the conviction of most biblical scholars that the Old Testament contains no description of the restoration of Israel to its ancient homeland which can apply to the Jewish people of the present age.

— The Christian Century: 144–145. December 1929

Political Zionism and Christian Zionism are biblically anathema to the Christian faith. [...] [T]rue Israel today is neither Jews nor Israelis, but believers in the Messiah, even if they are gentiles.

— John Stott

The La Grange Declarations of 1979 and 1981 were issued by a broad array of (mostly Protestant) Christian leaders critical of Christian Zionism who advocated for a change in church and governmental positions on Israel and Palestine. The 1979 statement, drafted at a conference in LaGrange, Illinois, criticized Israel’s territorial actions, recognized the right of Palestinians to self-determination, and called for the U.S. to end its unconditional backing of Israel, though it stopped short of denying Israel's legitimacy. The 1981 declaration took a more assertive stance, challenging the religious justification for Israel’s claims to the land, demanding a full cessation of U.S. military aid to Israel, and denouncing American policies that restricted the Palestine Liberation Organization (PLO). Both declarations represented a growing Christian movement that sought to oppose pro-Israel evangelical perspectives and bring attention to Palestinian political and humanitarian concerns.

In the United States, the General Assembly of the National Council of Churches in November 2007 approved a resolution for further study which stated that the "theological stance of Christian Zionism adversely affects:

- justice and peace in the Middle East, delaying the day when Israelis and Palestinians can live within secure borders
- relationships with Middle Eastern Christians (see the Jerusalem Declaration on Christian Zionism)
- relationships with Jews, since Jews are seen as mere pawns in an eschatological scheme
- relationships with Muslims, since it treats the rights of Muslims as subordinate to the rights of Jews
- interfaith dialogue, since it views the world in starkly dichotomous terms"

The Reformed Church in America at its 2004 General Synod found "the ideology of Christian Zionism and the extreme form of dispensationalism that undergirds it to be a distortion of the biblical message noting the impediment it represents to achieving a just peace in Israel/Palestine." The Mennonite Central Committee has criticized Christian Zionism, noting that in some churches under its influence the "congregations 'adopt' illegal Israeli settlements, sending funds to bolster the defense of these armed colonies." As of September 2007, churches in the US that have criticized Christian Zionism include the United Methodist Church, the Presbyterian Church (USA), and the United Church of Christ.

The 2009 film With God On Our Side, by Porter Speakman Jr. and Kevin Miller (the latter of whom also co-created the film Expelled: No Intelligence Allowed), criticizes both the underlying theology behind Christian Zionism as well as its negative influence on the church, from a Christian perspective.

In the United Kingdom, the Church of Scotland, despite its Restorationist history, has recently been critical of Zionism in general, and in turn has received strong criticism over the perceived injustice of its 2013 report, "The Inheritance of Abraham: A Report on the Promised Land", which resulted in its republication in a briefer form. On 9 July 2012, the Anglican General Synod passed a motion affirming support for the Ecumenical Accompaniment Programme in Palestine and Israel (EAPPI). This was criticised by the Board of Deputies claiming the Synod 'has chosen to promote an inflammatory and partisan programme'. The advocated group was simultaneously criticised for its publication of a call for sit-ins at Israeli Embassies, the hacking of government websites to promote its message, and support for the Boycott, Divestment and Sanctions campaign against Israel.

== Biblical interpretations ==
Some Christian Zionists interpret the prophetic texts as describing inevitable future events, and these events primarily involve Israel (taken to mean the descendants of the Biblical patriarch Jacob) or Judah (taken to mean the remaining faithful adherents of Judaism). These prophecies are seen as requiring the presence of a Jewish state in the Holy Land, the central part of the lands promised to the Biblical patriarch Abraham in the Covenant of the pieces. This requirement is sometimes interpreted as being fulfilled by the contemporary state of Israel.

=== Other doctrines ===
Christian schools of doctrine which consider other teachings to counterbalance these doctrines, or which interpret them in terms of distinct eschatological theories, are less conducive to Christian Zionism. Among the many texts which address this subject in counterbalance are the words of Jesus, as for example in Matthew 21:43, "the kingdom of God will be taken away from you and given to a nation producing the fruits of it".

In Defending Christian Zionism, David Pawson, a Christian Zionist in the United Kingdom, puts forward the case that the return of the Jews to the Holy Land is a fulfilment of scriptural prophecy, and that Christians should support the existence of the Jewish State (although not unconditionally its actions) on theological grounds. He also argues that prophecies spoken about Israel relate specifically to Israel (not to the church, as in "replacement theology"). However, he criticises Dispensationalism, which he says is a largely American movement holding similar views. Pawson was spurred to write this book by the work of Stephen Sizer, an evangelical Christian who rejects Christian Zionism.

== See also ==
- Center for Jewish–Christian Understanding and Cooperation
- Christian views on the Old Covenant
- Christianity in Israel
- Groups claiming affiliation with Israelites
- History of Zionism
- International Fellowship of Christians and Jews
- Jewish views on religious pluralism
- Jews as the chosen people
- Judaizers
- Muslim Zionism
- Philosemitism
- Sacred Name Movement
