= William Blaxton =

English settler (1595–1675)

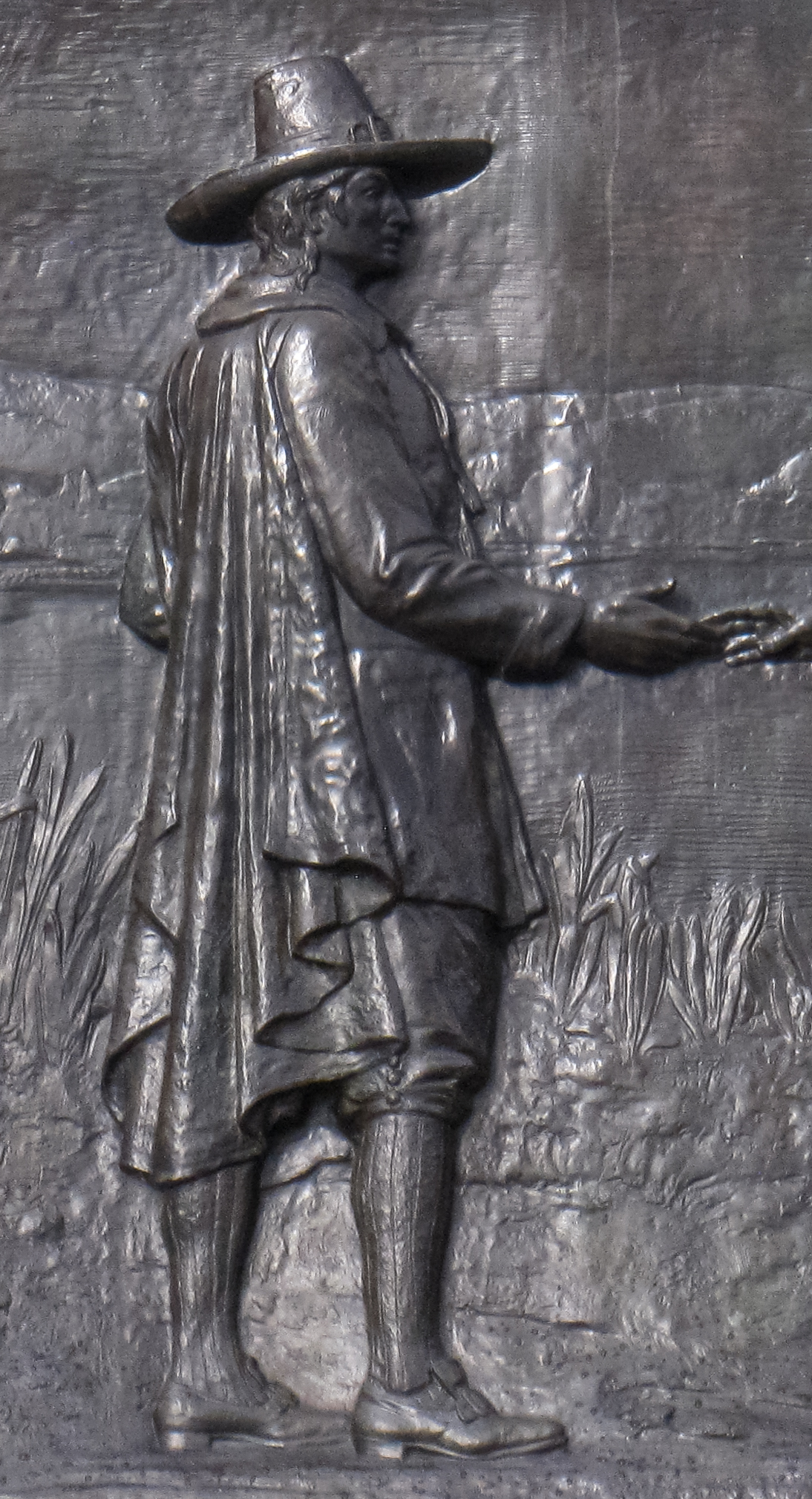
- Conjectural representation of Blaxton on The Founders Memorial (1930) in Boston
- Born: 1595; Horncastle, Lincolnshire, England
- Died: 26 May 1675 (aged 79–80); Lonsdale, Rhode Island, British America

William Blaxton (also spelled William Blackstone; 1595 – 26 May 1675) was an early English settler in New England and the first European settler of Boston and Rhode Island.

== Early life and education ==
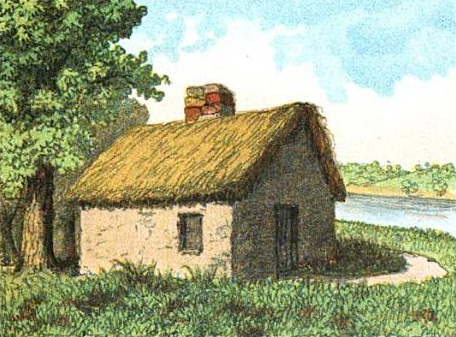
An 1889 conjectural drawing of Blaxton's house in Boston, built between 1630 and 1635

William Blaxton was born in Horncastle, Lincolnshire, England. He was admitted to Emmanuel College, Cambridge as a sizar in 1614 and received an MA in 1621. He was ordained as a priest of the Church of England in May 1619 by Thomas Dove, Bishop of Peterborough.

== Biography ==
Blaxton joined the failed Ferdinando Gorges expedition to America in 1623. He eventually arrived in Weymouth, Massachusetts later in 1623 on the ship Katherine, as a chaplain in the subsequent expedition of Robert Gorges. By 1625 all of his fellow travelers had returned to England and Blaxton moved five miles north to a 1 mi^{2} rocky bulge at the end of a swampy isthmus, surrounded on all sides by mudflats. Blaxton became the first colonist to settle in what would become Boston, living on the Western end of the Shawmut Peninsula by himself for more than five years.

In 1629, Isaac Johnson landed with the Puritans in nearby Charlestown but the rockier highlands lacked easily tappable wells. Blaxton and Johnson were university contemporaries from Emmanuel College, Cambridge.

In 1630 Blaxton wrote a historic letter to Johnson and his group that advertised Boston's excellent natural spring, and invited them to settle on his land, which they did on 7 September 1630. One of Johnson's last official acts as the leader of the Charlestown community before dying on 30 September 1630 was to name the new settlement across the river "Boston," after his hometown in Lincolnshire, from which he, his wife (namesake of the Arbella) and John Cotton had emigrated to New England.

Blaxton negotiated a grant of 50 acres (200,000 m^{2}) for himself in the final paperwork, around 10% of the peninsula's total area. However by 1633 the new town's 4,000 citizens made retention of such a large parcel untenable and Blaxton sold all but six acres back to the Puritans in 1634 for £30 ($5,455 in adjusted USD). Governor Winthrop purchased the land through a one-time tax on Boston residents amounting to 6 shillings (around $50 adjusted) a head. This land became a town commons open to public grazing and now forms the bulk of Boston Common, the major park in present-day downtown Boston.

The Anglican Blaxton did not get along with the Puritan leaders of the Boston church and in 1635 he moved about 35 miles (56 km) south of Boston to what the Indians called the Pawtucket River and is today known as the Blackstone River in Cumberland, Rhode Island. He was the region's first European settler, one year before Roger Williams established Providence Plantations.

The area that Blaxton settled was part of the Plymouth Colony until 1691, when it came under the jurisdiction of Massachusetts Bay Colony until 1741; it finally became part of the Colony of Rhode Island and Providence Plantations. He tended cattle, planted gardens, and cultivated an apple orchard, and he cultivated the first variety of American apples, the Yellow Sweeting. He called his home "Study Hill" and was said to have the largest library in the colonies at the time, but his library and house were burned during King Philip's War around 1675.

Blaxton's friends among the Indians included Narragansetts, Miantonomi, Canonchet, Wampanoag, sachems, Massasoit, and Metacomet. Metacomet was known to the colonists as King Philip, and it was his followers who later burned Blaxton's home to the ground during that sachem's eponymous war in the 1670s.

Roger Williams and Blaxton disagreed on many theological matters, but they remained lifelong friends. Williams frequently invited him to preach in Providence, among other churches throughout Rhode Island. According to one modern journalist Blaxton "is considered to be the pioneer clergyman of the Protestant Episcopal Church in the United States."

== Personal life ==
At age 64, Blaxton married a widow named Sarah Fisher Stevenson in Boston on 4 July 1659. They had a son, John (1660–1743). Sarah died in June 1673 at the age of 48.

== Death and legacy ==
Blaxton died on 26 May 1675 in Lonsdale, Rhode Island at the age of 80, leaving substantial holdings in real estate.

=== Places and things named after William Blackstone in New England ===
- Blackstone, Massachusetts
- Blackstone River
- Blackstone Canal
- Blackstone Street in Boston
- Blackstone Boulevard, Providence
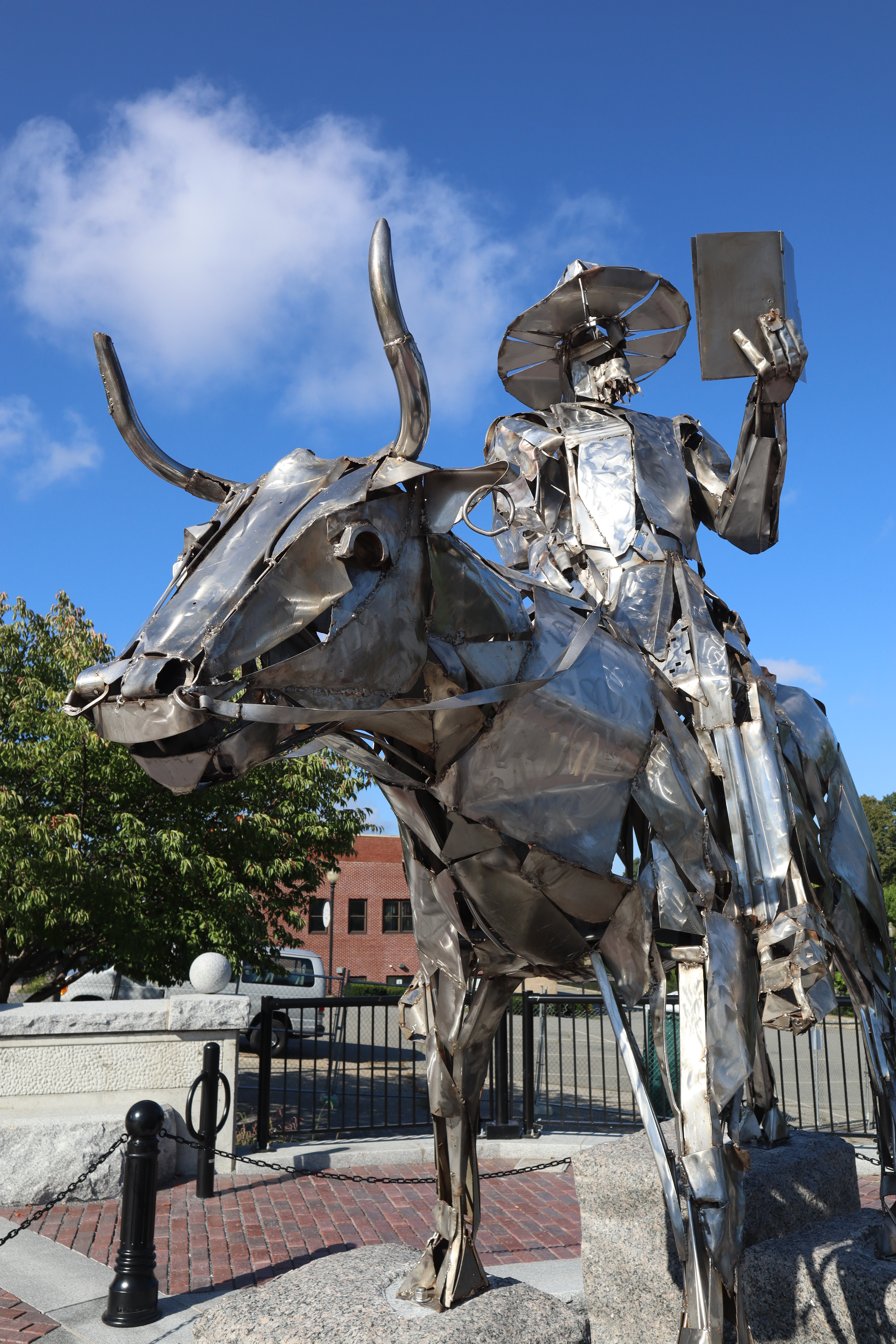
  Stainless steel statue in Pawtucket

=== Memorials ===
- In 2021, a stainless steel statue was erected in Pawtucket, Rhode Island at the corner of Exchange Street and Roosevelt Avenue. Inspired by an historical account of Blaxton's unpretentious manner, the statue is portrayed holding a book while riding a bull. The statue attracted criticism for commemorating a colonial settler as well as the defense that this criticism was misguided (the sculptor selected for the commission was Peruko Ccopacatty, an Aymara indian originally from Peru).
- William Blackstone Memorial Park in Cumberland, Rhode Island
- Plaque on Beacon Street in Boston marking the site of his house
- Boston Common Tablet
- The Founders Memorial, Boston Common

=== Notable descendants ===
- Harriet Blackstone (1864–1939), painter
- Timothy Blackstone (1829–1900), industrialist
- William Eugene Blackstone (1841–1935), evangelist and Zionist; author of the proto-Zionist Blackstone Memorial of 1891
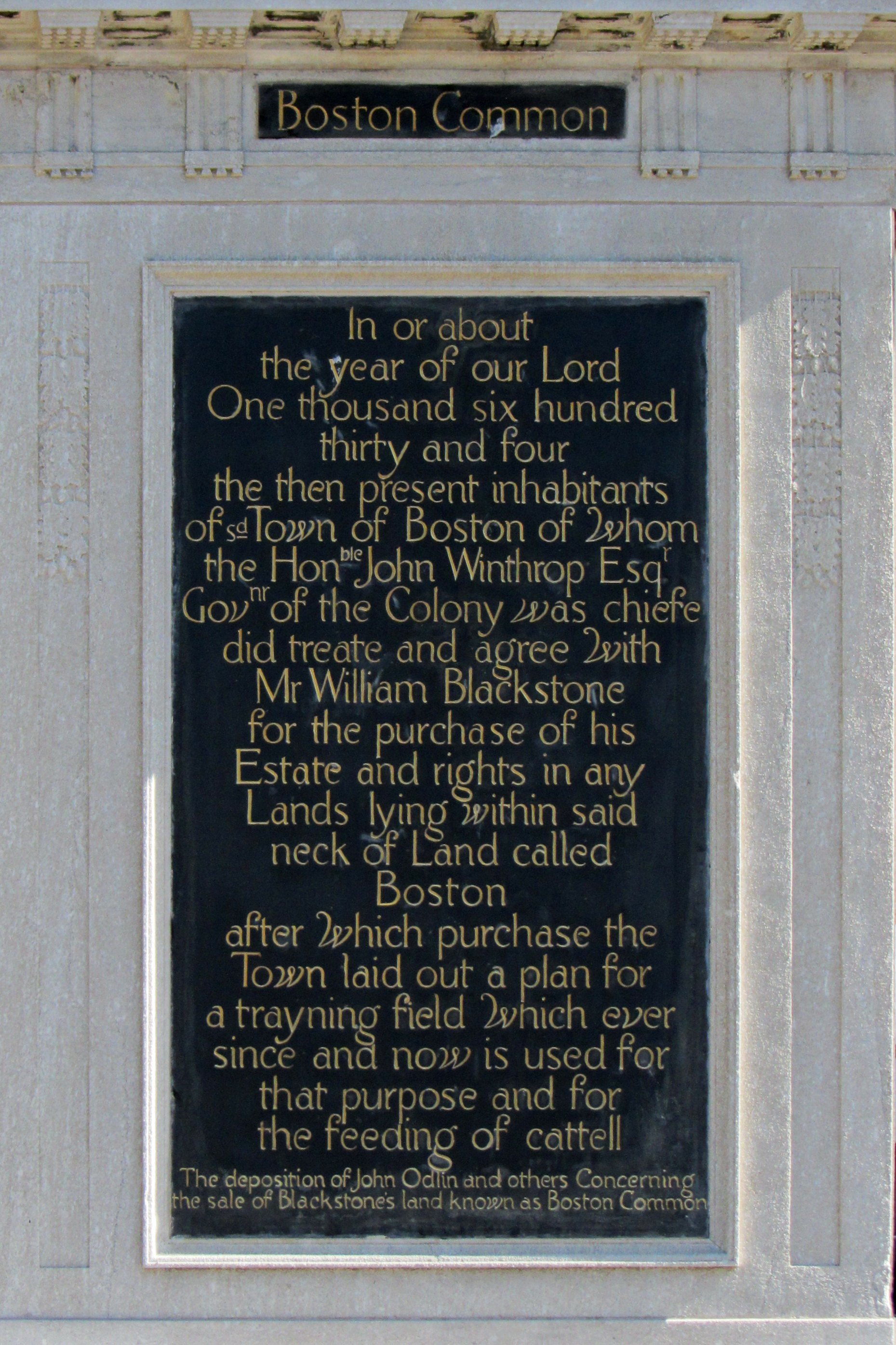
  Plaque at Boston Common

== See also ==
- List of early settlers of Rhode Island
