= Thomas Keith (surgeon) =

Scottish surgeon and photographer

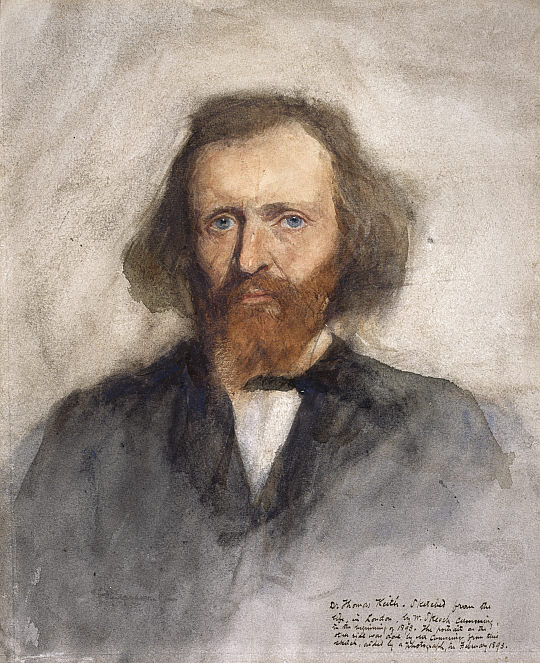
- Thomas Keith by William Skeoch Cumming
- Born: 27 May 1827; St Cyrus, Aberdeenshire, Scotland, United Kingdom
- Died: 9 October 1895 (aged 68); London, England, United Kingdom
- Occupation: Surgeon

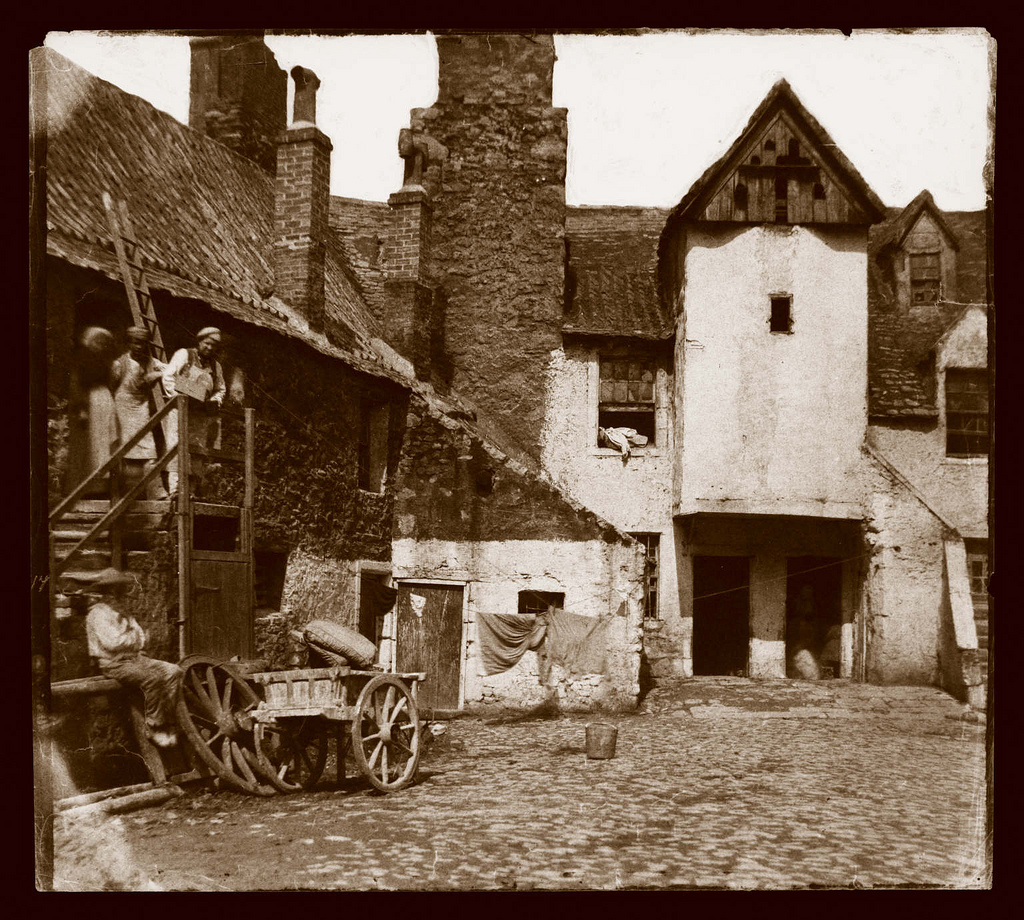
Whitehorse Close in Edinburgh, calotype by Thomas Keith

Thomas Keith FRCSEd (27 May 1827 – 9 October 1895 ) was a Victorian surgeon and amateur photographer from Scotland. He developed and improved the wax paper process and his photographs are recognised for their composition and use of shade. He was an early practitioner of the operation of ovariotomy (ovarian cystectomy) where his published results were amongst the best in the world.

== Early life and education ==
Thomas Keith was born in St Cyrus, Kincardineshire in 1827, one of seven sons of Rev. Dr. Alexander Keith, a Church of Scotland minister, one of the 450 who broke away to form the Free Church of Scotland, an event known as the Disruption of 1843. Rev Keith took an early interest in photography travelling with his elder son George Skene Keith (1819–1910) to the Holy Land in 1844 where he took daguerreotype views of notable places in Syria. This early family interest in photography when it was still in its infancy was undoubtedly a major stimulus to the photographic career of Thomas Keith which began some eight years after the expedition of his father and brother to the Holy Land. Keith's mother, Jane Blaikie (1793–1837), was the sister of Sir Thomas Blaikie, the Scottish magistrate. Three of Thomas Keith's brothers entered the medical profession.

Thomas Keith was educated at Aberdeen Grammar School and the Royal High School, Edinburgh then studied at Marischal College, Aberdeen where he qualified MA. His medical training took place entirely in Edinburgh.

== Early Surgical career ==
In 1848, at the age of 21 he graduated MD from the University of Edinburgh and was appointed house surgeon in the Royal Infirmary of Edinburgh to James Syme (1799–1870), the Professor of Surgery. This appointment was to last for fifteen months and it was during this time that he learned from Syme the principles of surgery which were to form the basis of his future success. It was from Syme that he came to appreciate the importance of absolute cleanliness in the surgical wound and meticulous attention to detail, particularly with haemostasis. Their respect was mutual. When Syme's wife became ill, Syme, who could have chosen any surgeon in the land to attend her, chose Keith. Keith was succeeded as house surgeon by the young Joseph Lister, and the two remained friends for life.

Before starting in practice in Edinburgh, Keith spent two years in Turin as a surgeon to a family friend, the Hon Ralph Abercromby, British resident minister (ambassador) at the Court of Victor Emmanuel II, the King of Sardinia (and later first King of a united Italy).

On return to Edinburgh, Keith passed the necessary examination and was elected a Fellow of the Royal College of Surgeons of Edinburgh. (FRCSEd) He then went into medical practice with his brother George Skene Keith (1819–1910) in Great Stuart Street. George had studied medicine in Aberdeen and Edinburgh, qualified MD in 1841 and become FRCPE in 1845. In that year he became assistant to Professor James Young Simpson, Professor of Midwifery at the University of Edinburgh. On 4 November 1847, Simpson with George Keith and his other assistant James Mathews Duncan (1826–1890), (another photographic enthusiast), conducted the famous experiment at 52 Queen Street, Edinburgh during which the trio discovered the anaesthetic effects of chloroform. In 1875 he was elected a member of the Harveian Society of Edinburgh.

Thomas Keith came to specialise in gynaecology and in 1862 performed his first ovariotomy (excision of ovarian cyst) but in the years 1853–56 he devoted much of his time to photography.

== Photographic career ==
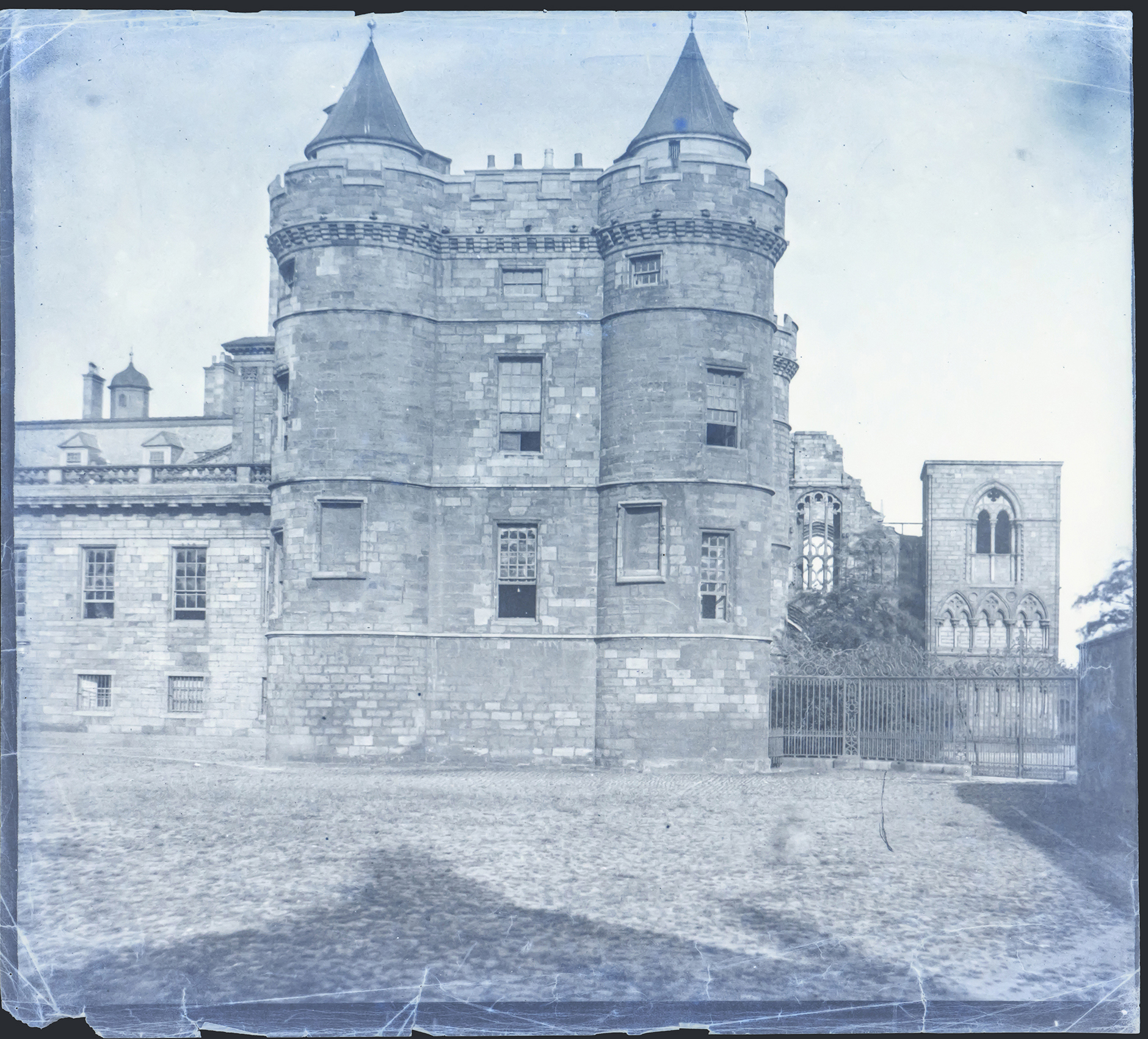
Holyrood Palace, waxed-paper negative by Thomas Keith, c. 1856.

The leading pioneers of photography in Scotland included David Octavius Hill and Robert Adamson whose many calotypes included a portrait of Thomas Keith's father, Rev. Alexander Keith. This early contact with them, and with the other photographic pioneers Sir David Brewster and Dr James Brewster, had stimulated Rev. Keith and his son George to learn how to produce daguerreotypes. This in turn initiated Thomas Keith's interest.

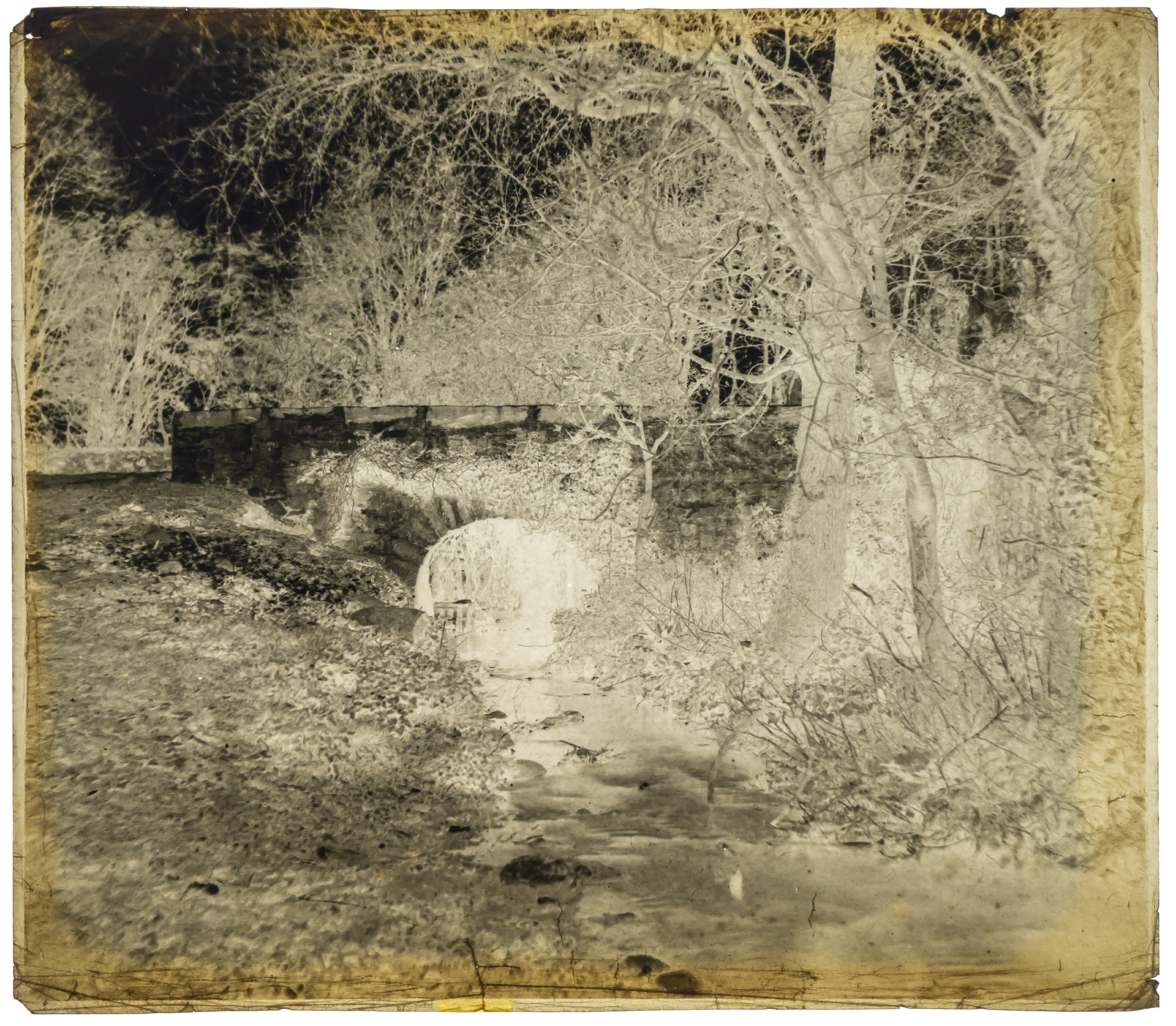
Bridge over Stream (possibly Brunstan near Musselburgh) wax-paper negative by Thomas Keith, c. 1856.

He was a founding member of the Photographic Society of Scotland.

In his photography Thomas Keith used the waxed paper process developed by Gustave Le Gray (1820–1884), which he simplified and improved. His work showed great artistic skill and a mastery of the chemistry involved. These included a series of intricate chemical processes including waxing the paper before iodising it with a solution of potassium iodide and other chemicals, then sensitising it to light with a solution of silver nitrate and acetic acid. Keith published the details of his modification of le Gray's technique in Photographic Notes in 1856, noting that the original technique was ‘not suitable for our climate’. He describes various changes he tried in the chemical solutions, in timing and in temperature, all carefully recorded along with their effects on the final image. This account shows his meticulous attention to detail and his willingness to innovate and experiment. He often shared his photographic excursions around Edinburgh with his brother-in-law John Forbes White. Because of the pressures inflicted by his medical practice, Keith did not continue with photography after 1856, but by this time he had created a priceless photographic record of nineteenth-century Edinburgh and images of Dysart in Fife and Iona.

== Photographic collections ==
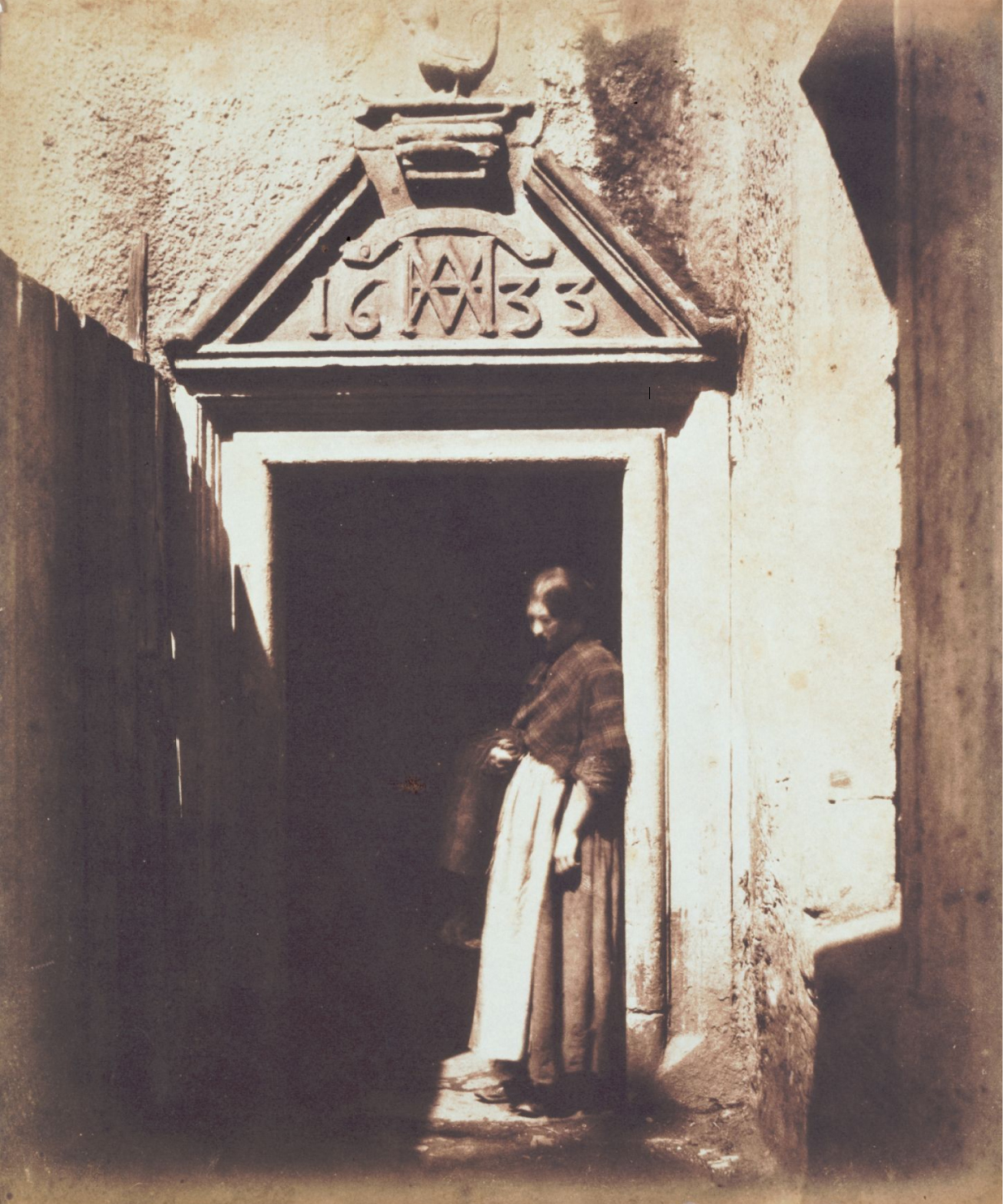
Woman in Doorway, calotype by Thomas Keith

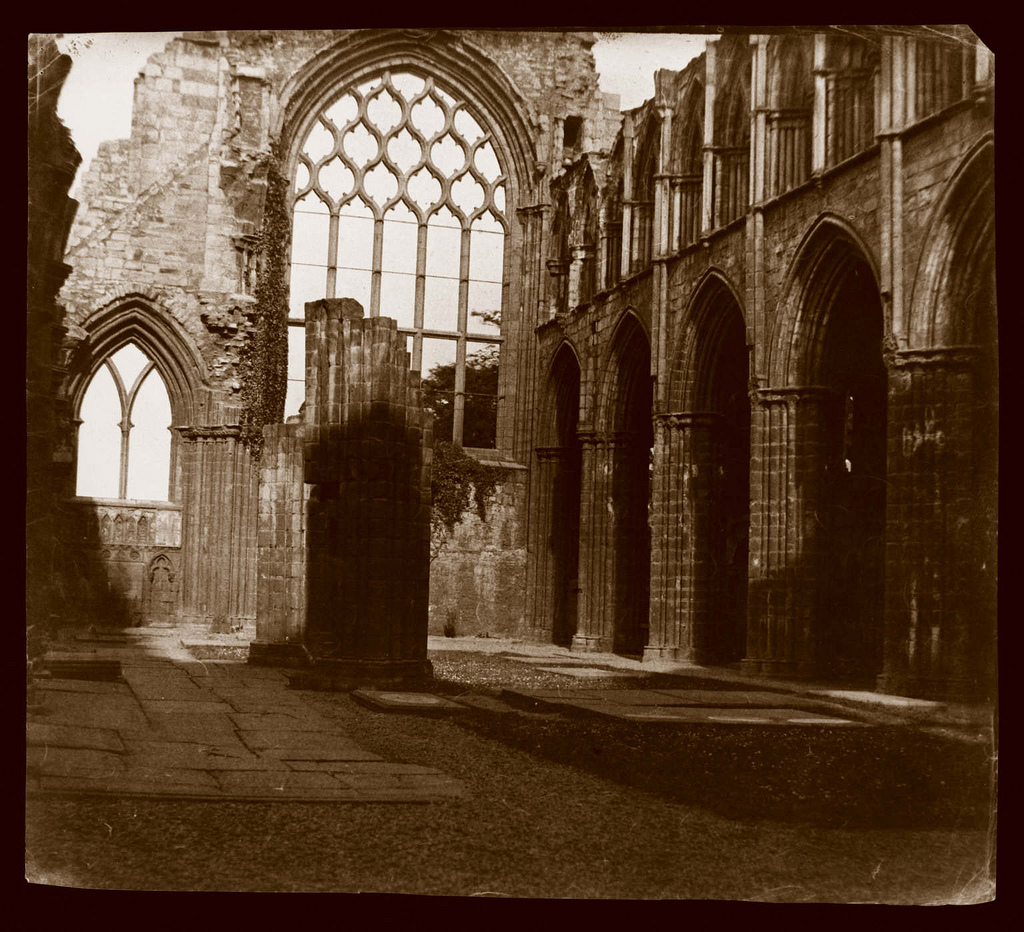
Holyrood Abbey, east gable, Edinburgh, by Thomas Keith

Keith's prints and negatives are held by a number of institutions, including the Edinburgh Central Library, the Scottish National Portrait Gallery, the Royal Scottish Academy, the National Museum of Photography, Film and Television, the Canadian Centre for Architecture, George Eastman House, Harry Ransom Center and the National Gallery of Art, Department of Image Collections.

== Later surgical career ==
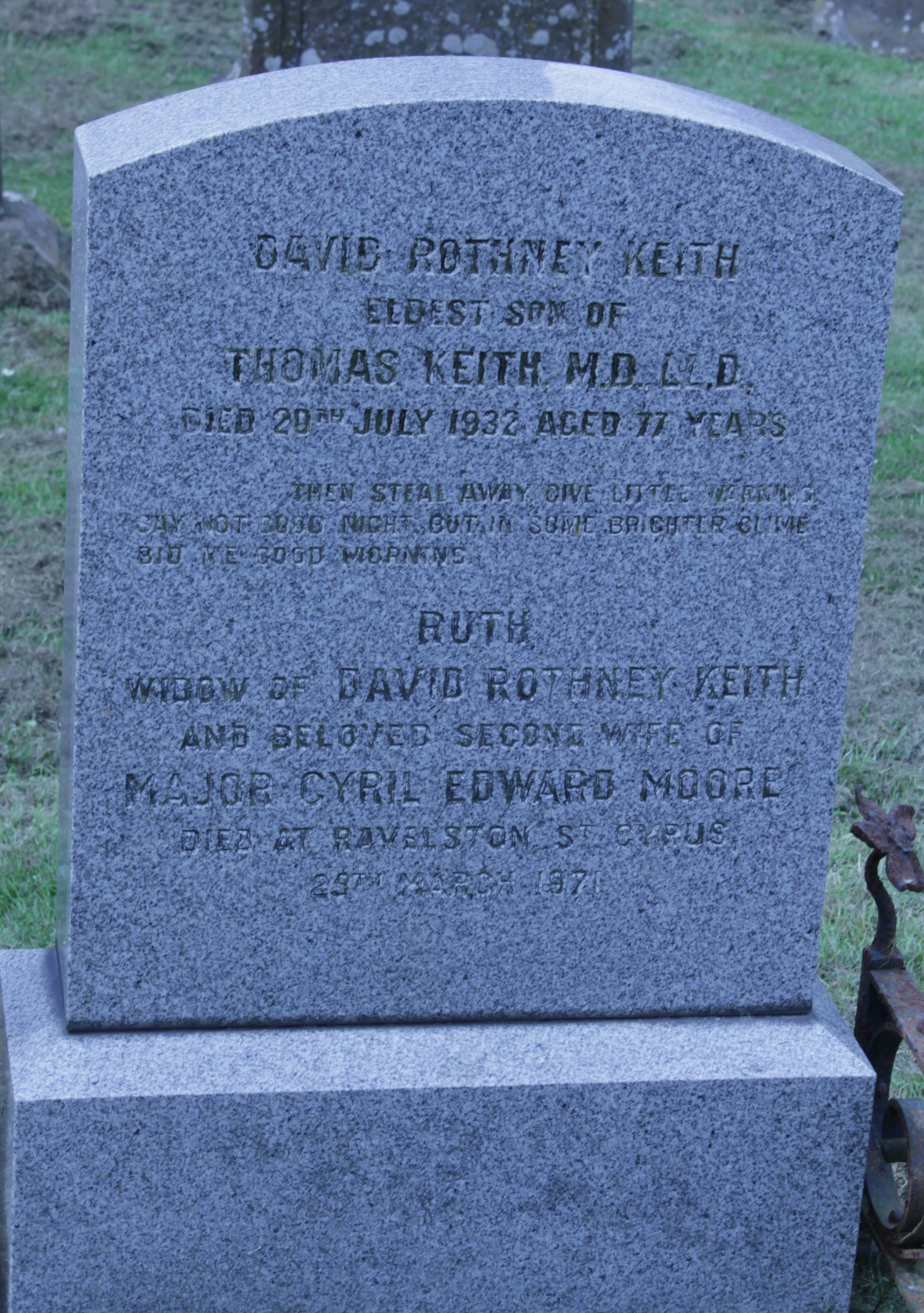
Memorial to Dr Thomas Keith in St Cyrus churchyard

After 1856 Keith devoted himself to surgery and in particular to the then new and controversial procedure of ovariotomy. The first documented successful performance of this procedure was by Ephraim McDowell (1771–1830) in Kentucky in 1809. McDowell had studied surgery in Edinburgh under John Bell (1763–1820) who described the operation but never performed it. Bell's successor in Edinburgh John Lizars (1787–1860), was sent McDowell's account and he performed the first successful ovariotomy in Britain, publishing the results in 1825. Surgeons like Charles Clay (1801–1893) in Manchester and Thomas Spencer Wells (1818–1897) in London began to perform the procedure regularly, but the mortality rate was so high that mainstream medical opinion felt that it was too dangerous to perform. Keith performed his first ovariotomy in 1862, having learned the technique from Spencer Wells. From the outset he recorded his results in detail. His early mortality rate was consistently lower than that of other published series like Spencer Wells. Keith further reduced the mortality rate to 4% when he began to use antiseptic technique, taught to him by his lifelong friend Joseph Lister.

The leading American gynaecologist J. Marion Sims (1813–1883) visited Keith to find the ‘secret’ of these remarkable results and concluded that Keith's meticulous attention to detail was largely responsible for his ‘success which so outstripped that of all other operators, that it became a wonder and admiration of surgeons all over the world.’ Keith gained a worldwide reputation. He began to perform the hysterectomy procedure, again with low mortality compared to other published series. In 1888 Keith moved to London, living at Charles Street, Berkeley Square. His reputation was such that he was consulted by eminent people such as Lady Randolph Churchill (1854–1921), but his years here were dogged by ill health. The congenital cystinuria, which had caused him to pass urinary calculi from childhood and had required operations, now caused a renal abscess which drained by his son and surgical partner Skene Keith (1858–1919. He attributed some of his health problems to the large quantities of bicarbonate which he took to combat the condition and his repeated exposure to antiseptic agents may also have been a factor in his death at the age of 67.

He died early on the morning of Wednesday, 9 October 1895 and was buried in Kensal Green Cemetery.

A memorial to Keith also lies in his home at St Cyrus churchyard.

== Family ==
On 4 June 1854 he had married Elizabeth Johnston, first cousin to Jessie (née Grindlay) wife of Sir James Young Simpson, and they had had six children, all of whom survived him.
