= John Fenwick =

John Fenwick may refer to:

- John Fenwick (14th century MP) for Northumberland (UK Parliament constituency)
- Sir John Fenwick, 1st Baronet (c. 1570–1658), English landowner
- John Fenwick (MP for Morpeth) (d. 1644), English politician and soldier who was killed at the Battle of Marston Moor
- John Fenwick (Quaker) (1618–1683), English founder of a Quaker colony in Salem, New Jersey
- John Fenwick (Jesuit) (c. 1628–1679), English Jesuit
- Sir John Fenwick, 3rd Baronet (c. 1645–1697), English Jacobite conspirator
- John Ralph Fenwick (1761–1855), English physician and radical
- John Fenwick Burgoyne Blackett (c. 1821–1856), British politician
- John Fenwick (bishop), Free Church of England bishop

Also

- John Fenwicke (c. 1593–1670), supported the parliamentary cause during the English Civil War.
- John Fenwick Service Area, a service area for travelers using the New Jersey Turnpike
