= La Grange Declarations =

1979 and 1981 documents critical of Zionism

The 1979 and 1981 La Grange Declarations were statements issued by Christian activists advocating for a shift in U.S. church and government policy regarding Israel and Palestine. The 1979 declaration, formulated at a conference in LaGrange, Illinois, criticized Israel's territorial policies, acknowledged Palestinian rights to self-determination, and called for an end to unconditional U.S. support for Israel while stopping short of questioning Israel's right to exist. The 1981 declaration went further, explicitly challenging the theological basis for Israel's claims to the land, advocating for an end to all U.S. military aid to Israel, and condemning U.S. restrictions on the Palestine Liberation Organization (PLO). Both declarations called for changes in Christian and U.S. policy toward Israel and the Palestinians and criticized evangelical support for Israeli territorial claims.

== La Grange Declaration I ==
The first La Grange Declaration was issued in 1979 by Christian clergy and activists who criticized Christian Zionism and supported Palestinian political rights while affirming Israel’s statehood. The declaration emerged from a Conference on the Middle East called Human Rights and the Palestinian-Israeli Conflict: Responsibilities for the Christian Church, held May 18–20, 1979 in La Grange, Illinois. It was signed by an initial group of 60 participants, later growing to 5,000 signatories, and was published in Sojourners Magazine and the Reformed Journal.

The declaration criticized Israel's military occupation of the West Bank, Gaza, and East Jerusalem following the 1967 Six-Day War, stating that these regions and their people had suffered under foreign military rule. It expressed repentance for Christian silence and inaction regarding these issues and called for a peace process that recognized the rights of both Israelis and Palestinians. It asserted that Palestinians have the right to a sovereign state of their choosing and emphasized that biblical teachings do not grant Israel a religious right to the West Bank.

The declaration stated in part:

We are anguished by the fact that countless Christians believe that the Bible gives to the modern State of Israel a divine right to lands inhabited by Palestinian people, and divine sanction to the State of Israel’s policy of territorial acquisition.

The statement was co-sponsored by the Middle East Task Force of the Presbytery of Chicago (PCUSA) and the Palestine Human Rights Campaign. The declaration was endorsed by a group of evangelical, mainline Protestant, Catholic, and Christian Orthodox leaders, including Ralph Abernathy, Thomas Gumbleton, Lewis Smedes, Mark Hatfield, Stephen Mott, Syngman Rhee, Richard Shaull, and Jim Wallis.

Rev. Don Wagner, a Presbyterian minister who was one of the sponsors of the conference, identified the declaration as an important development in Christian opposition to Zionism in the United States. Dan Simmons, an Evangelical Covenant Church minister who was formerly the director of World Vision for Palestine and Israel, said that the La Grange Declaration was a turning point for him in his views on the Middle East.

The statement drew criticism from some Jewish organizations and Christian observers. The Anti-Defamation League (ADL) expressed concern that the declaration ignored Israeli security and Jewish human rights, while the National Christian Leadership Conference for Israel criticized the lack of Israeli or Jewish voices in the discussion. Catholic priest George Higgins criticized the conference and declaration as biased toward the Palestinian position and insufficiently balanced in their treatment of the conflict.

== La Grange Declaration II ==
The La Grange Declaration II was issued in 1981 following a conference held from May 7–9, 1981 in La Grange Park, Illinois, organized by the Palestine Human Rights Campaign and co-sponsored by Christian groups Pax Christi and Sojourners. The conference sought to increase support among U.S. Christians for Palestinian political rights and to challenge evangelical support for Israeli policies. The text of the statement was published in Sojourners Magazine.

The declaration called for ending all U.S. military aid to Israel and restricting humanitarian aid unless equal support was provided to Palestinians. It questioned Israel's right to statehood, criticized biblical justifications for Israeli sovereignty, and urged U.S. engagement with the Palestine Liberation Organization (PLO).

The 1981 document stated in part:

We question Biblically the vision of nationalism and statehood limited to any particular people as the means for building a durable and just peace in the Holy Land.

Attendees and signatories included Christian leaders such as John Howard Yoder, Vernon Grounds, and Joseph Lowery. Arab speakers included former West Bank mayors Muhammed Milhem and Fahd Kawasmeh, as well as Northwestern University’s Ibrahim Abu-Lughod, who likened Israel to apartheid-era South Africa. Arab American activist James Zogby also spoke at the conference.

Unlike the original La Grange Declaration (1979), which criticized Israeli policies but acknowledged its statehood, the 1981 statement took a stronger stance, calling for a complete reevaluation of U.S.-Israel relations and advocating more insistently for Palestinian self-determination and leadership.

The 1981 conference also included discussions on mobilizing U.S. churches to support Palestinian rights, with some participants proposing the deployment of church-funded fieldworkers in Israel and the West Bank to monitor Israeli actions.

Some Jewish participants, including Rabbi Arnold Jacob Wolf, engaged in the discussions, while others, such as Rabbi Arnold Kaimin, withdrew upon learning of the Palestine Human Rights Campaign's involvement. The conference also featured debates over the role of evangelicals, with some speakers urging churches to challenge pro-Israel narratives within Christian communities.
