= American Palestine Committee =

American pro-Israel political lobby group

The American Palestine Committee was a political lobby group in the United States founded in 1932 to influence American policy towards the establishment of a Jewish national home in Palestine, an aim achieved in 1948 with U.S. support for the Partition of Palestine and subsequent recognition of the new state of Israel.

== History ==
Conceived by Emanuel Neumann, a member of the Executive of the Zionist Organization, late in 1931, following the 1930 publication of the Passfield White Paper by the British government, which was seen as a retreat from the commitments of the Balfour Declaration and the Mandate for Palestine. The idea of the American Palestine Committee was to organize a group of prominent (mainly non-Jewish) Americans in political support of the Zionist project of creating a Jewish Homeland in Palestine. The Committee was launched at a public dinner in Washington on January 17, 1932, and attended by members of both houses of Congress, and government dignitaries, including Vice President Charles Curtis. A letter of greeting from President Herbert Hoover was read to the audience. The principal speeches at the inaugural meeting were delivered by Felix Frankfurter, Emanuel Neumann, and Elwood Mead.

By the 1940s, the membership of the committee had grown to 15,000 and included two-thirds of the United States Senate, as well as many members of the United States House of Representatives, state legislatures, mayors and other influential political figures. The main event in its calendar was an annual dinner. In 1944 the committee sponsored a National Conference on Palestine which passed resolutions calling for maximum Jewish immigration to Palestine and the conversion of Palestine into a Jewish Commonwealth.

The American Palestine Committee worked jointly with other bodies including the Christian Council on Palestine and the American Zionist Emergency Council and succeeded in 1945 in having the U.S. Congress adopt a resolution supporting the creation of a Jewish Commonwealth in Palestine.

In 1946 the organization merged with the Christian Council on Palestine to become the American Christian Palestine Committee. At that point its membership numbered over 15,000 Christians. On August 22, 1946, Bartley Crum spoke at a committee lunch, during which he "tore into British and U.S. Officialdom and the handling of the Palestinian question."

In 1947 it advocated quick implementation of the United Nations Special Committee on Palestine's plan. A few years following the successful creation of Israel in 1948, the American Christian Palestine Committee felt its work done and disbanded.

The ZOA helped mobilized political support in the United States for Israel, with large scale funding and pressure on Washington and on public opinion. Emanuel Neumann and Hillel Silver were two leaders of the ZOA. They felt its massive funding legitimized taking a major role in shaping Israeli government policy . They opposed the social and economic policies of Prime Minister David Ben-Gurion and his Mapai (Labor) Party, according to historian Zohar Segev. Their interventions were rejected and Israeli politicians agreed that American Zionists had a major role in funding but not in policy guidance.

== See also ==
- Christian Zionism
- Israel lobby in the United States
