= Conversion of the Jews =

Conversion of the Jews may refer to the:

- Conversions of Jews to Christianity
- Conversion of the Jews (future event)

== See also ==
- "The Conversion of the Jews", 1958 short story by Phillip Roth, included in the collection Goodbye, Columbus
