= The Founders Memorial =

Sculpture in Boston, Massachusetts, U.S.

- Founding of Boston
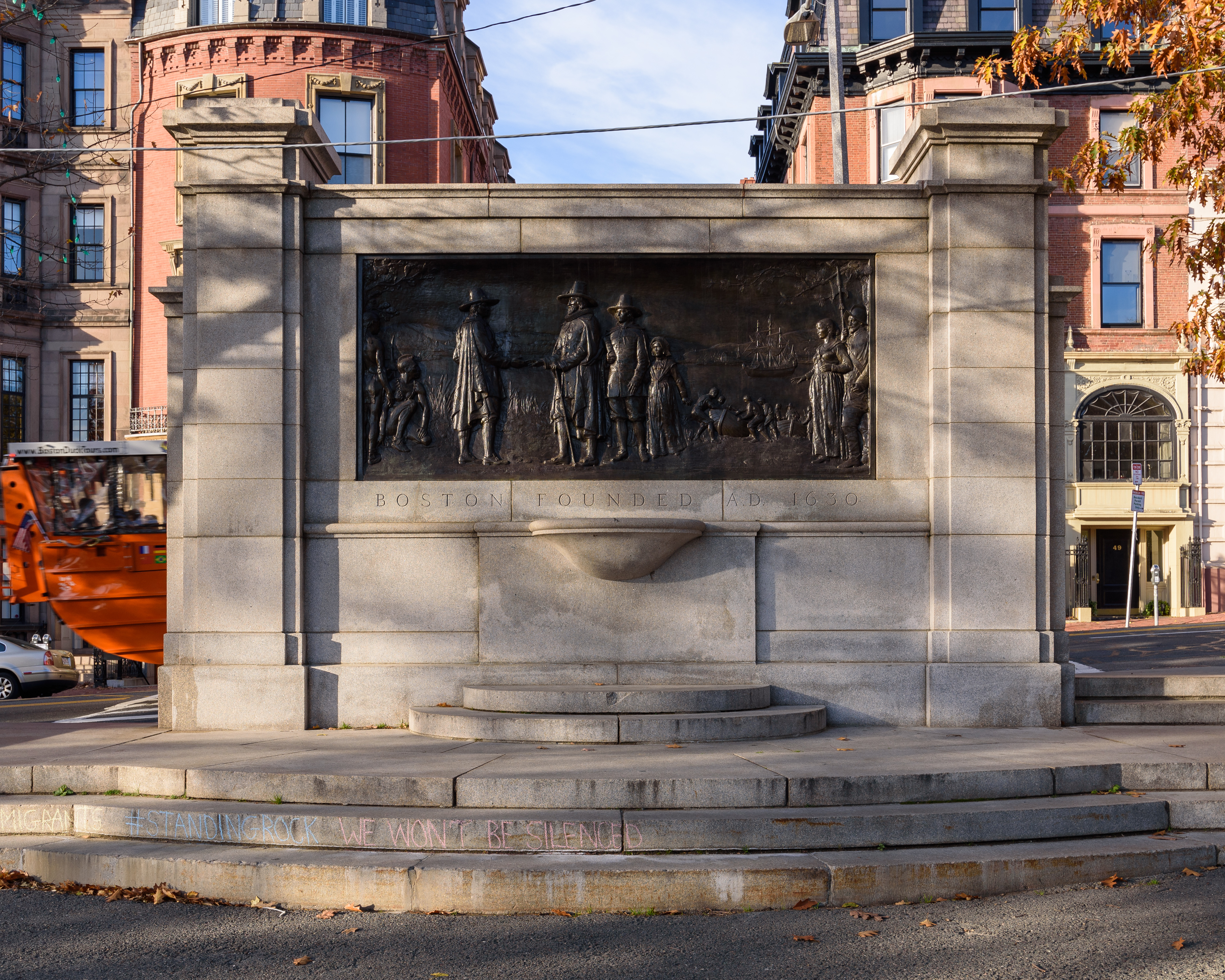
- The memorial in 2016
- Artist: John Francis Paramino
- Year: 1930
- Medium: Bronze relief, granite, slate
- Location: Boston, Massachusetts, U.S.; 42.356502°N 71.067581°W

The Founders Memorial, also known as Founding of Boston, is a 1930 sculpture by John Francis Paramino in Boston Common, in Boston, Massachusetts.

== Description ==
The memorial features a bronze relief set in granite. The relief is approximately 5.5 ft. tall and 11 ft. wide. It depicts William Blaxton (left) greeting John Winthrop (right) and others, including Ann Pollard, two Native Americans, and an allegorical female representing Boston. The slate and cast iron base measures approximately 15x 45 x 20 ft.

== History ==
The memorial was commissioned by the city to commemorate Boston's 300th anniversary. It was installed in 1930 and dedicated on September 17 of that year. The work was surveyed by the Smithsonian Institution's "Save Outdoor Sculpture!" program in 1993.
