= Blackstone Memorial =

1891 Christian Restorationist petition

The Blackstone Memorial of 1891 was a petition written by William Eugene Blackstone, a Christian Restorationist, in favor of the delivery of Palestine to the Jews. It was signed by many leading American citizens and presented to President Benjamin Harrison.

== History ==
The Memorial was motivated by concern over the plight of the Jews in Russia where they were being murdered in government-incited pogroms. It argued that it would be politically unwise to ask the Russian government to desist, "What shall be done for the Russian Jews? It is both unwise and useless to undertake to dictate to Russia concerning her internal affairs." But assumed that they would not be welcome in western countries, "Where shall 2,000,000 of such poor people go? Europe is crowded and has no room for more peasant population. Shall they come to America? This will be a tremendous expense, and require years." There was a solution:

"Why not give Palestine back to them again? According to God's distribution of nations it is their home, an inalienable possession from which they were expelled by force."

"Why shall not the powers which under the treaty of Berlin, in 1878, gave Bulgaria to the Bulgarians and Servia to the Servians now give Palestine back to the Jews? These provinces, as well as Roumania, Montenegro, and Greece, were wrested from the Turks and given to their natural owners. Does not Palestine as rightfully belong to the Jews?"

The Memorial petition was circulated in five major cities: Boston, Baltimore, Philadelphia, New York City, and Chicago. It was signed by 431 prominent citizens from those cities: financiers John D. Rockefeller and J. P. Morgan, future President William McKinley, and Chief Justice Melville Fuller; many members of Congress; the editors of all major newspapers in those five cities, including the still-extant The Boston Globe, The New York Times, Chicago Tribune, The Philadelphia Inquirer, and The Washington Post; and a long list of university and seminary presidents, mayors, and leading businessmen. The Memorial was presented to President Harrison with little result.

The Blackstone Memorial was turned over to the State Department archives for safe keeping. It has been lost since. All knowledge of the Blackstone Memorial are derived from newspaper reports of the period and biographies of the major people involved. A copy of the Memorial can be found in the Blackstone archives at the Billy Graham Center on the campus of Wheaton College.

May 16, 1916, Nathan Straus, at the behest of (later Supreme Court Justice) Louis Brandeis wrote Rev. Blackstone. “Mr. Brandeis is perfectly infatuated with the work that you have done along the lines of Zionism. It would have done your heart good to have heard him assert what a valuable contribution to the cause your document is. In fact he agrees with me that you are the Father of Zionism, as your work antedates Herzl".

== Second Memorial ==
After the initial contact, Brandeis asked Rev. Blackstone to prepare for presentation to President Woodrow Wilson a second Blackstone Memorial. The purpose of the second Memorial was to influence President Wilson to support the developing Balfour Declaration. Rev. Blackstone, though 75 years of age, energetically undertook the mission. Of central importance to the second Memorial was the securing by Rev. Blackstone of the endorsements of the Presbyterian Church and most of the mainstream American Protestant movement. President Wilson was a deeply religious Presbyterian. The second Memorial was presented privately to President Wilson May, 1917. The Memorial strongly influenced President Wilson to let the British government of Lloyd George know of American sympathy in favor of the Balfour Declaration. The second Blackstone Memorial was never publicly presented.
