= William E. Blackstone =

American evangelist and Christian Zionist (1841–1935)

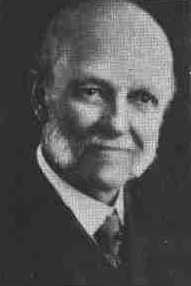
- Born: William Eugene Blackstone; 6 October 1841; Adams, New York
- Died: 7 November 1935 (aged 94)

Philosophical work
- Main interests: Evangelism, Christian Zionism

William Eugene Blackstone (6 October 1841 – 7 November 1935) was an American evangelist and Christian Zionist. He was the author of the Blackstone Memorial (1891), a petition which called upon the United States to actively return the Holy Land to the Jewish people. Blackstone was influenced by Dwight Lyman Moody, James H. Brookes, and John Nelson Darby.

== Life and work ==
Blackstone was born in Adams, New York and became an Evangelical Christian when he was 11 during revival meetings at a local Methodist church. He enlisted for military service during the American Civil War but was not accepted due to "frailness of body". Instead he joined the United States Christian Commission (similar to the modern Red Cross) and was stationed much of the time at General Ulysses S. Grant's headquarters as coordinator of medical services for injured combatants.

On June 5, 1866, Blackstone married Sarah Lee Smith, daughter of Philander Smith, and settled in Oak Park, Illinois in 1870, where he very successfully engaged in the "business of building and property investments". Blackstone, in a single night of personal spiritual struggle, decided to dedicate his life to God. Renouncing material pursuits, he proclaimed for the balance of his long life, in his preaching as well as in his writing, the premillennial return and rapture of the Christian Church. As he ministered across the United States, Blackstone spoke with increasing fervor in support of Jewish restorationism.

In 1878, Blackstone published his work titled Jesus is Coming under his initials W.E.B., which was widely received and remains a classic premillennial work. Translated into over 40 languages at the time, Blackstone's writing helped to give momentum to the resurgence in Rapture theology.

He initially focused on the restoration of the Jews to the Holy Land as a prelude to their conversion to Christianity, out of a pious wish to hasten the return of Jesus Christ; but he increasingly became concerned with the Russian government-instigated pogroms in Eastern Europe and believed that it was necessary to create a Jewish homeland in Palestine. He was, furthermore, persuaded that neither the European nations nor the United States would accept as many Jews as needed to escape from Europe.

Sparked by the rise in Jewish immigration to Chicago from Eastern Europe, Blackstone met with a group of men at the offices of Mr. Benjamin Douglass on November 4, 1887, to discuss the possibility of beginning an evangelistic work among Jewish people in the city. As a result of that meeting, a committee was appointed to find both a missionary and quarters. Representing a cross section of evangelical churches and seminaries in Chicago, the organization's interdenominational character was a core aspect of the ministry. Because of Blackstone's passion for Israel and the Jewish people, he would serve as the first Superintendent and come to be known as the "founder" of The Chicago Committee for Hebrew Christian Work, which was renamed two years later as The Chicago Hebrew Mission, which is still in operation today as Life in Messiah.

Blackstone and his daughter traveled to the Holy Land in 1888. He returned convinced that a return of the Jewish people to their historic homeland was the only possible solution to the persecution that the Jews suffered elsewhere. On November 24–25, 1890, Blackstone organized the Conference on the Past, Present, and Future of Israel at the First Methodist Episcopal Church in Chicago, where participants included leaders of both Orthodox Jewish and Protestant Christian communities, albeit not leaders of the Jewish Reform movement.

The conference issued a call urging the great powers, including the Ottoman Empire, to give Palestine to the Zionists. Resolutions of sympathy for the oppressed Jews living in the Russian Empire were passed, but Blackstone was convinced that such resolutions – even though passed by prominent men – were insufficient. He advocated strongly for the voluntary resettlement of the Jewish people, suffering under virulent anti-Semitism, in Palestine.

A year later in 1891, Blackstone led a petition drive that was approved by the conference. It was later known as the Blackstone Memorial, which was signed by 413 prominent Protestant Christian and a few Orthodox Jewish leaders in the United States. Blackstone personally gathered the signatures of men such as John D. Rockefeller, J.P. Morgan, Cyrus McCormick, senators, congressmen, religious leaders of all denominations, newspaper editors, the Chief Justice of the U.S. Supreme Court, and others for the Blackstone Memorial. He presented the Memorial to U.S. President Benjamin Harrison in March 1891, calling for the American support of a Jewish state in Palestine, at the time an area controlled by the Ottoman Empire. His petition presaged and paralleled the later ideas of Theodor Herzl, founder of the modern Zionist movement, whose establishment of a Jewish state was outlined in his pamphlet Der Judenstaat (1896).

The Blackstone Memorial read, in part:

Why shall not the powers which under the treaty of Berlin, in 1878, gave Bulgaria to the Bulgarians and Servia to the Servians, now give Palestine back to the Jews? [...] These provinces, as well as Romania, Montenegro, and Greece, were wrested from the Turks and given to their natural owners. Does not Israel as rightfully belong to the Jews?

Also in 1891, Blackstone stated that, the general "law of dereliction" did not apply to the Jews in regard to Palestine:

for they never abandoned the land. They made no treaty; they did not even surrender. They simply succumbed, after the most desperate conflict, to the overwhelming power of the Romans.

Learning of the rise of the modern Zionist movement, led by Theodor Herzl, Blackstone became an outspoken and ardent Christian supporter of Zionism. When Herzlian Zionists considered the offer by the British government of an interim Jewish state in "Uganda" (actually parts of British East Africa), he campaigned against it. He sent to Herzl a personal Bible outlined with the specific biblical prophecies transmitted through the Old Testament referring to the restoration of Jews to the Holy Land. In 1904, Blackstone began preaching that the world has already been evangelized, citing Acts 8:4, Mark 16:20, and Colossians 1:23. As one of the most popular evangelists in the United States, he traveled extensively continuing to spread the gospel until his death 31 years later.

Supreme Court Justice Louis D. Brandeis rediscovered the Blackstone Memorial in 1916 during the period of his raucous, at times antisemitic, Congressional appointment hearings. Brandeis, as head of the American Zionist movement, using the intercession of Nathan Straus who first brought Brandeis's attention to the potential significance of the Blackstone Memorial of 1891, sought out and formed an alliance with Blackstone. Nathan Straus wrote to Blackstone on May 16, 1916, on behalf of Brandeis: "Mr. Brandeis is perfectly infatuated with the work that you have done along the lines of Zionism. It would have done your heart good to have heard him assert what a valuable contribution to the cause your document is. In fact he agrees with me that you are the Father of Zionism, as your work antedates Herzl".

Brandeis requested that Blackstone reissue a modern Blackstone Memorial to U.S. President Woodrow Wilson. Brandeis understood the fundamentals of power politics and grassroots American Christian and American political support. Brandeis understood the support that Blackstone would raise for the Memorial would enable President Wilson to accept and endorse American Zionism and the later British Balfour Declaration, which set the course for the establishment of the State of Israel. Though 75 years of age, Reverend Blackstone energetically undertook the strenuous project. Of particular note, Blackstone secured the endorsement of his Memorial to President Wilson from the Presbyterian Church in the United States, since the latter was a religiously observant Presbyterian. The Memorial, though presented to President Wilson only privately, was very effective in garnering his support and in turn reassuring the British of American support for the Balfour Declaration. The Blackstone Memorial of 1916, unlike the Memorial of 1891, was never publicly presented.

Blackstone remained committed to Jewish restorationism and Christian Zionism for the balance of his long life. As a believing Evangelical Christian, he witnessed the seeming fulfillment of biblical prophecy as the Jewish state came back to life after 1,900 years. Blackstone died on 7 November 1935, thirteen years before Israel was founded in 1948. He was buried in a modest grave at the Forest Lawn Cemetery in Glendale, California.
