= George Bush (biblical scholar) =

American biblical scholar and pastor (1796–1869)

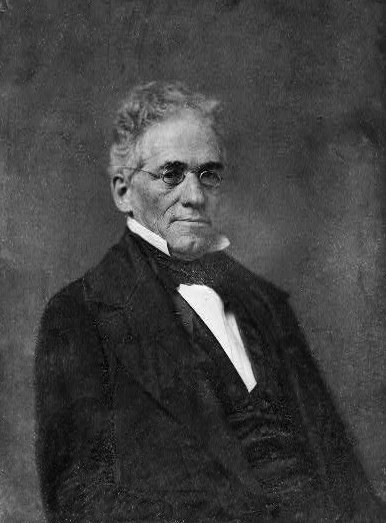
- Born: June 12, 1796; Norwich, Vermont, U.S.
- Died: September 19, 1859 (aged 63); Rochester, New York, U.S.
- Education: Dartmouth College; Princeton University
- Occupations: Biblical scholar, pastor, abolitionist
- Relatives: Bush family

George Bush (June 12, 1796 – September 19, 1859) was an American biblical scholar, pastor, abolitionist, and academic. A member of the Bush family, he is a distant relative of both President George H. W. Bush and President George W. Bush; his cousin was Obadiah Newcomb Bush, the great-great-grandfather of George H. W. Bush.

== Career ==
Born in Norwich, Vermont, Bush graduated from Dartmouth College in 1818, and then studied theology at Princeton Theological Seminary, where he was a tutor 1823–1824. He was ordained in the Presbyterian ministry, spent four years as a Christian missionary in Indiana, and in 1831 became professor of Hebrew and oriental literature at New York University.

His first book, The Life of Mohammed, was the first American biography of the religious leader. It refers to Muhammad as "remarkable" and "irresistibly attractive", but is a largely negative assessment of him, depicting him as a fraud. It also takes a dim view of the state of Christianity of Muhammad's age. The book fell out of print, but became briefly controversial in Egypt in 2004.

In 1844 Bush published a book entitled The Valley of Vision; or, The Dry Bones of Israel Revived. In it he denounced "the thralldom and oppression which has so long ground them (the Jews) to the dust," and called for "elevating" the Jews "to a rank of honorable repute among the nations of the earth" by restoring the Jews to the land of Israel where the bulk would be converted to Christianity. His prediction that the State of Israel would be restored came true; however, his prediction that the bulk of Jews would be converted did not. This, according to Bush, would benefit not only the Jews, but all of mankind, forming a "link of communication" between humanity and God. "It will blaze in notoriety....It will flash a splendid demonstration upon all kindreds and tongues of the truth."

Also in 1844, he published a monthly magazine called Hierophant, devoted to the elucidation of scriptural prophecies, and he issued, in New York, a work entitled Anastasis, in which he opposed the doctrine of the literal resurrection of the body. Attacks upon this latter work, which attracted much attention, he answered in The Resurrection of Christ.

In 1845 he embraced Swedenborgianism and went on to write many defenses of his new faith. He translated and published the diary of Emanuel Swedenborg in 1845, and became editor of the New Church Repository. In 1947 he published "Mesmer and Swedenborg" where he argued that Franz Mesmer's work supported his belief in Swedenborgianism. While working on this book he was also a witness to Andrew Jackson Davis's trances where he dictated "The Principles of Nature, Her Divine Revelations, and a Voice to Mankind" while allegedly being mesmerized by Dr. Silas S. Lyon to his scribe, William Fishbough. Professor Bush believed that Davis was in contact with the spiritual world and praised him in the beginning of "Mesmer and Swedenborg" and included an Appendix with additional praise. However after he read "The Principles of Nature," which came out about the same time as his book about Swedenbirg and Mesmer, he had second thoughts and wrote "'Davis' Revelations' Revealed" a short pamphlet refuting many of the claims in "The Principles of Nature," however he didn't doubt Davis's sincerity, or the legitimacy of his trances or alleged communication with the spiritual world, instead he came to the conclusion that Davis was deceived by the spirits he allegedly came into contact with, which was supported by some of the teachings Emanuel Swedenborg, which were also quoted in "Mesmer and Swedenborg" where Swedenborg claims that some of the alleged spirits lie.

== Published works ==
- The Life of Mohammed: Founder of the Religion of Islam, and of the Empire of the Saracens New-York: Printed by J. & J. Harper 1831
- Treatise on the Millennium (1833)
- A Grammar of the Hebrew Language (1st edition: New York, 1835; 2nd edition: New York, 1839)
- The Valley of Vision; or, The Dry Bones of Israel Revived (New York, 1844)
- The Resurrection of Christ; in Answer to the Question, Whether He Rose in a Spiritual and Celestial, or in a Material and Earthly Body (New York, 1845)
- Illustrations of the Holy Scriptures (Philadelphia, 1845)
- The Soul; or an Inquiry into Scriptural Psychology, as developed by the use of the terms, Soul, Spirit, Life, etc., viewed in its bearings on The Doctrine of the Resurrection (New York, J.S. Redfield, 1845)
- Mesmer and Swedenborg (1847). Here Bush argued that the doctrines of Swedenborg were corroborated by the developments of mesmerism.
- New Church Miscellanies (1855)
- Priesthood and Clergy Unknown to Christianity (1857)
- Notes Critical and Practical on the Book of Genesis, 2 volumes, New York
- Notes Critical and Practical on the Book of Exodus (Boston, 1871)
- Notes Critical and Practical on the Book of Leviticus (1833)
- Notes Critical and Practical on the Book of Numbers
- Notes Critical and Practical on the Book of Joshua
- Notes Critical and Practical on the Book of Judges (New York, 1862)
- Bible Atlas
- Hebrew Grammar

== See also ==
- Bush family
