= George Skene Keith (physician) =

Scottish physician (1819–1910)

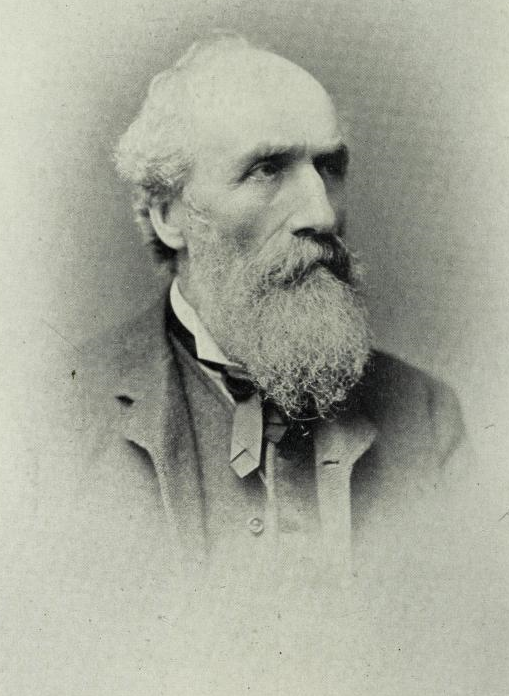
George Skene Keith

George Skene Keith (11 March 1819 – 12 January 1910) M.D., F.R.C.P., LL.D was a Scottish physician, photographer and author.

== Biography ==
Keith was born in St Cyrus. He took his M.D. degree in 1841 and was admitted a licentiate of the Royal College of Surgeons of Edinburgh (RCSEd). He became a Fellow of the RCSEd in 1845. Keith was a Gold Medallist in Professor James Young Simpson's class at University of Edinburgh.

His father was minister Alexander Keith. In 1844, he visited Palestine with his father for five months and took some of the earliest photographs of the region. He took 30 daguerreotypes, eighteen of which were published as engravings in his father's book Evidences of the Truth of the Christian Religion in 1848.

In 1847, Keith took part in an experiment with James Young Simpson and colleagues which demonstrated the use of chloroform upon humans as an anaesthetic. Keith practiced medicine successfully in Edinburgh until 1880 but later became disillusioned with the medical community and embraced simple living. He was not fond of drugs, instead he prescribed little food, fresh air, plenty of hot water and rest to his patients.

== Publications ==
- Plea for a Simpler Faith (1897)
- Plea for a Simpler Life (1897)
- Fads of an Old Physician (1897)
- On Sanitary and Other Matters (1900)
- Plea for a Simpler Life: And, Fads of an Old Physician (1900)
