= John Fenwicke =

English Civil War Soldier

- Born: c. 1593; Stamfordham, Northumberland
- Died: 1670

Lt.-Col. John Fenwicke (c.1593–1670) was an English soldier who supported the parliamentary cause during the English Civil War.

== Biography ==
Fenwicke was a younger son of Roger Fenwick (c.1566–1618), gentleman, of Bitchfield, in the parish of Stamfordham, Northumberland, and his wife, Mabel. He served an apprenticeship in Newcastle upon Tyne under a boothman (corn merchant) called Robert Bewick, and then became a merchant of the same city.

Fenwicke was successful in trading textiles and by 1633 had an income of £4000 per annum, making him one of Newcastle's wealthiest merchants. His business took him to Scotland and he sympathised with the Presbyterians in Scotland, going so far as to sign the Covenant. On his return to England, the Secretary of State Sir Francis Windebank ordered his arrest for treason. Fenwicke went back to Scotland and accompanied the Covenanter Army when it advanced into England and occupied his home town of Newcastle.

In 1641 Fenwicke wrote a pamphlet called The Downfall of the Pretended Divine Authoritie of the Hierarchy into the Sea of Rome. in which he denounced the Arminian clergy of Durham as giving succour and encouragement to the Roman Catholics in the North East of England. His wife Jane sparked a riot when she interrupted the inaugural sermon of vicar of Newcastle on his return to Newcastle after the departure of the Scots, in which the mayor had to intervene to save her life.

The majority of the merchants of the city of Newcastle, like their local magnate, William Cavendish, Marquess of Newcastle, supported the Royalist cause during the English Civil War, and they had little sympathy for Fenwicke. On 8 September 1643, he was disenfranchised from Newcastle's corporation. His remaining property was confiscated by Royalist, but he was not cowed and continued to campaign for the Presbyterian and Parliamentary cause publishing a pamphlet that same year called Christ Ruling in the Midst of his Enemies..

Fenwicke fortunes rose with the rise of the Parliamentary victories in the North East. At the start of 1644 a Scottish army crossed the border and laid siege to Newcastle. After the Battle of Marston Moor 2 July 1644, the Marquis Newcastle left the country and went into exile, the Scots stormed and captured Newcastle on 19 October 1644.

On 30 September 1644 (shortly before the fall of Newcastle and after the battle of Marston Moor), on the recommendation of William Armyne, Fenwicke as "a person well affected to the parliament" Fenwicke was appointed master of Sherburn Hospital in county Durham. He subsequently held a command in the parliamentarian army, and rose to the rank of lieutenant-colonel, was sent to Ireland in 1646, and on 24 May 1647, gained a signal victory over the rebels in the neighbourhood of Trim, County Meath.

On 6 May 1650, the council of state recommended to the Rump Parliament that his son John should succeed Fenwicke as master of Sherburn Hospital for life. On 2 July 1650, the mastership of Sherburn Hospital was, by vote of the House of Commons and settled on his son John for life, but at the Restoration of 1660 he was ejected from the mastership.

In 1655 and 1658 (before the Restoration), Fenwicke enrolled his sons John and Joshua as merchant adventurers of Newcastle. In 1662, he was listed as a non–communicant of All Saints' Church, Newcastle, and died around 1670.

== Bibliography ==
He was the author of:

1. A tract called The Downfall of the Pretended Divine Authoritie of the Hierarchy into the Sea of Rome, 1641.
2. A tract, with the quaint title, Christ ruling in the midst of his Enemies, or some first-fruits of the Church's deliverance budding forth out of the Crosse and Sufferings, and some remarkable Deliverances of a twentie yeares Sufferer, and now a Souldier of Jesus Christ, 1643, reprinted 1846.
3. A great Victorie against the Rebels in Ireland near Trim on 24 May 1647, by Colonel Fenwicke's Forces.

== Family ==
Fenwicke married Jane, daughter of John Hall of Newcastle; they had two sons, John being the elder.
