= Alexander Keith (minister) =

Church of Scotland minister (1791–1880)

The Reverend Alexander Keith
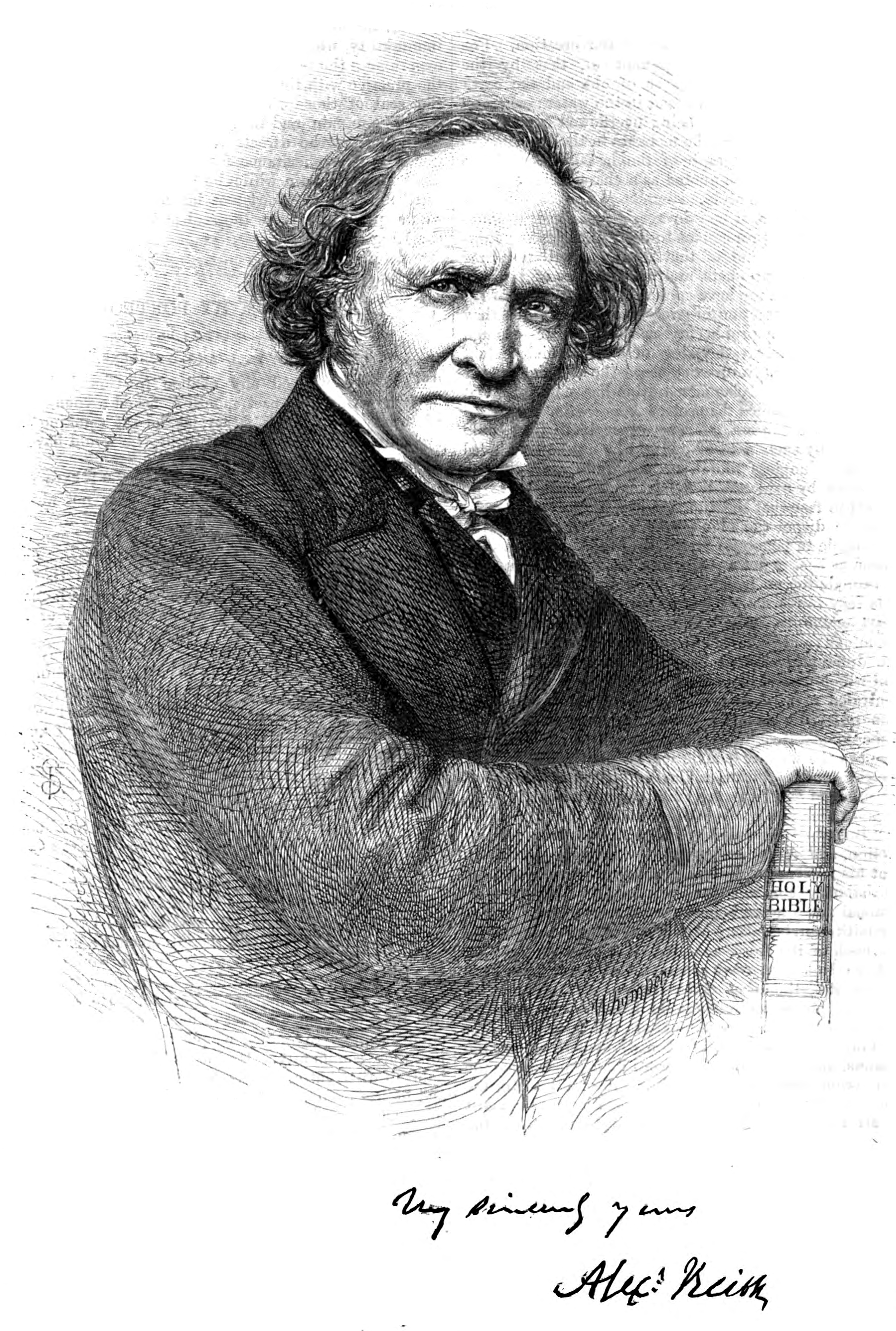
- Alexander Keith from memoir

Personal details
- Born: 13 November 1792
- Died: 8 February 1880 (aged 87)
- Education: Marischal College, Aberdeen

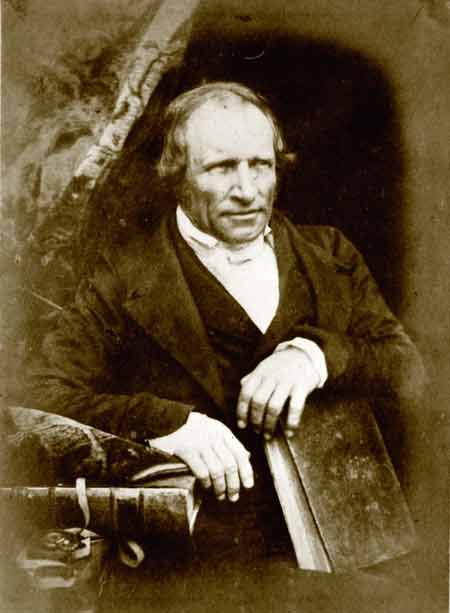
By Hill & Adamson

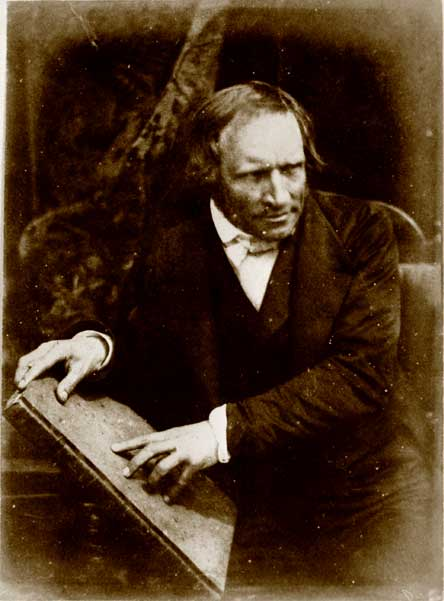
Rev. Alexander Keith

Alexander Keith (13 November 1791 – 8 February 1880) was a Church of Scotland and Free Church minister, known for his writings on biblical prophecy. Keith interpreted the bible as teaching a premillennial view of Jesus' return and many of his books relate to the place of the Jews and how they relate to Jewish and Christian prophecies in the Bible. Keith, along with Robert Murray M'Cheyne, Andrew Bonar, and Alexander Black visited Palestine on a missionary trip. Taking a faster route home than their other companions Black and Keith passed through Budapest. Keith contracted cholera and nearly died but was influential in setting up a mission to the Jews in Hungary. At the Disruption, Keith sided with the Free Church and continued to minister to a congregation at St Cyrus and to publish works on biblical prophecy.

== Life ==
He was the son of George Skene Keith of Keith Hall and Kinkell, where he was born at the manse on 13 November 1791. He graduated M.A. at Marischal College, in 1809. He was ordained by the Church of Scotland as minister of St. Cyrus in 1816, remaining there until 1839.

At the Disruption of 1843, Keith left the established Church of Scotland and joined the Free Church of Scotland.

William Garden Blaikie, the nephew of Keith wrote this about his uncle:

I remember him saying, that what led to his writing his book on The Evidence of Prophecy was a conversation with a gentleman in the country town of Stonehaven, who laid great stress on Hume’s argument against miracles. It occurred to. Dr. Keith that there was still an actual, continuous miracle, to which appeal might be made, patent to the senses, namely, the fulfilment of literal prophecy. There were two topics well fitted to show this: the history of the Jews, and the present condition of Palestine and other Bible lands. He set himself with great diligence to collect facts bearing on these, reading books of travel, and twice paying visits to the Holy Land. His book had an extraordinary popularity, there being some forty editions, besides abridgments. Cases of conversion arising from the reading of it were very numerous. There is reason to believe that the Duke of Wellington was one of those who were impressed by it. An attempt was made in the Quarterly Review to show that it differed little from a similar book by Bishop Newton. The editor refused to insert any reply, but a pamphlet prepared by a friend, the late Rev. Dr. Brewster of Crail, a brother of Principal Sir David Brewster, was inserted as an advertisement, vindicating the originality of Dr. Keith, especially in his two special lines, the statements of modern travellers and the state of the Jews.

Keith is probably best remembered for his book, Evidence of the Truth of the Christian Religion Derived from the Literal Fulfillment of Prophecy, which has gone through numerous revisions and many editions. It is still in print in a 2005 edition from Kessinger Publishing.

In the General Assembly of the Free Church, Keith is recorded as speaking out against the National Covenant:

"Moderator, God never made, and never will make, a National Covenant with any people but one — the children of Abraham; and the day that sees this Church recognising any other National Covenant than that, will see me for the last time a member of it."

== Palestine and Eastern Europe ==
=== Palestine ===
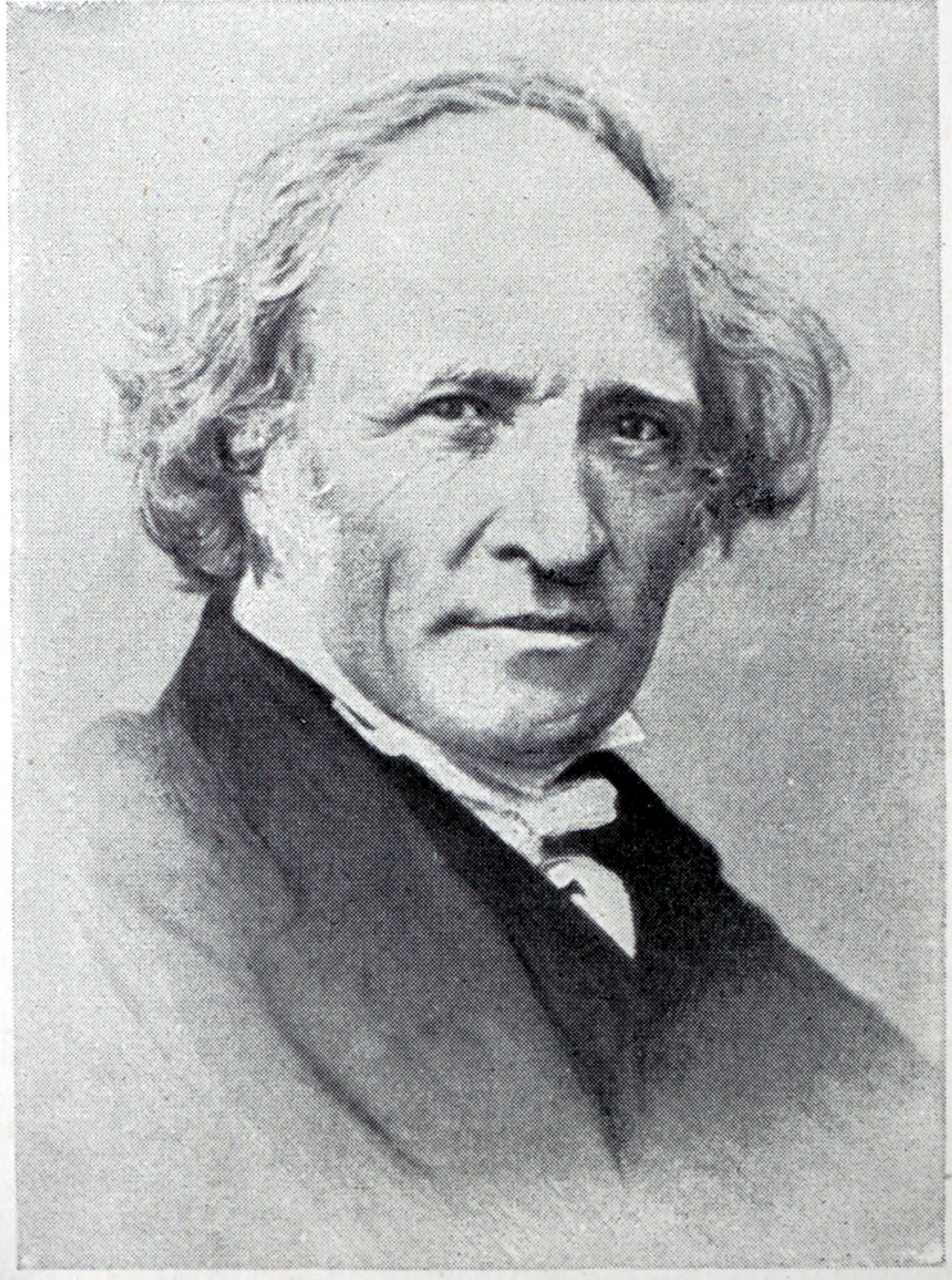
Dr. Alexander Keith the First Convener of the Jewish committee from "The Sea of Galilee Mission of the Free Church of Scotland"

Julia Pardoe who nursed Alexander Keith during his illness.

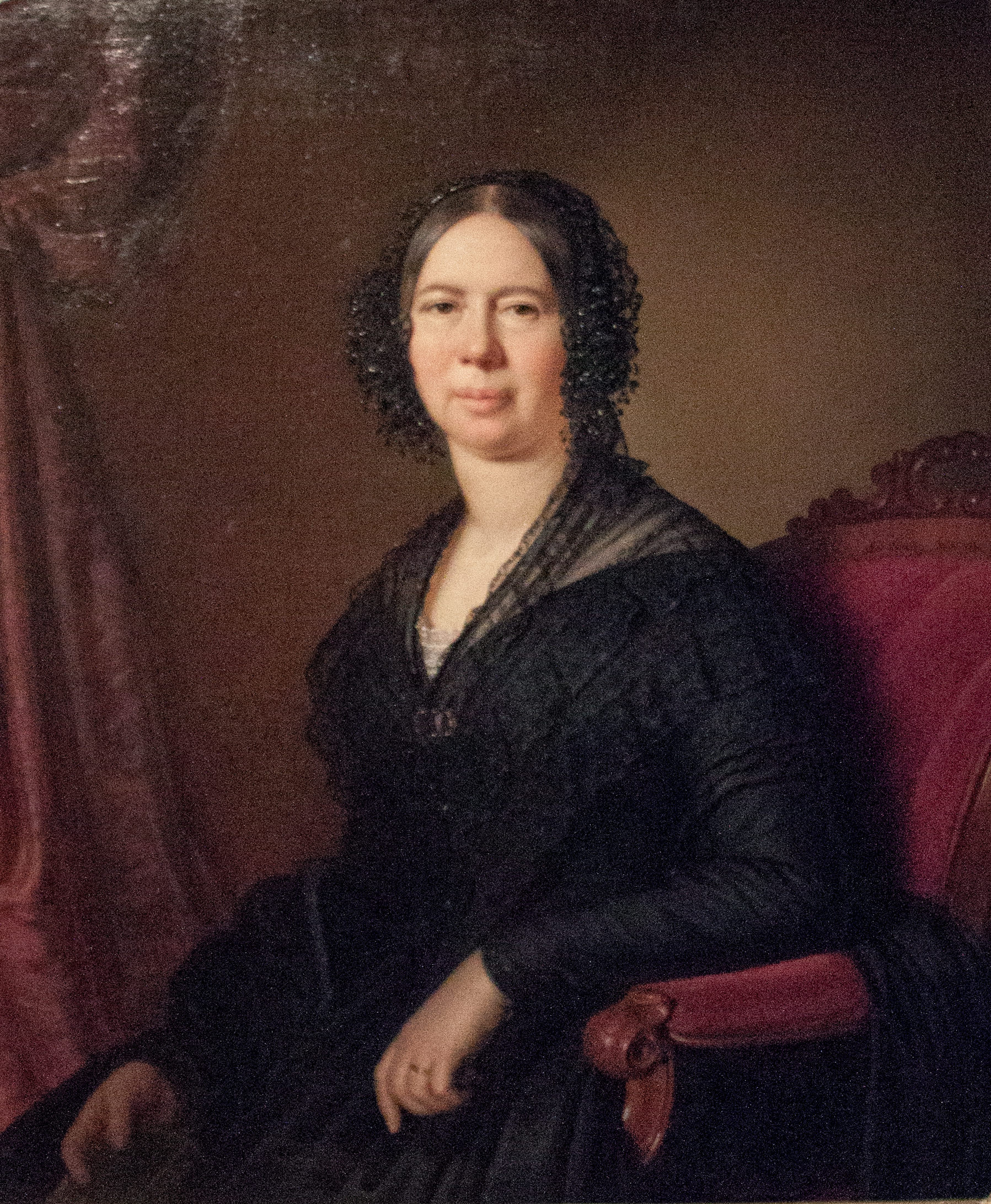
Archduchess Maria Dorothea

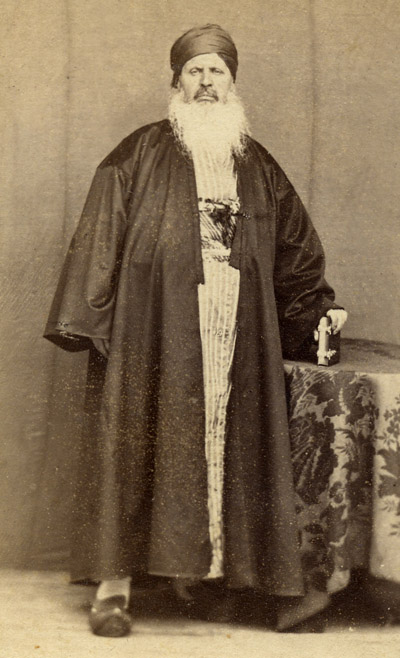
Mikhail Mishaqa who converted from Greek Catholicism to Protestantism after reading a translation of Keith's Evidence.

Keith is also remembered as one of four Church of Scotland ministers who in 1839 undertook a Mission of Inquiry to Palestine. The others were Andrew Bonar, Robert Murray M'Cheyne and Alexander Black. The group travelled through France, Greece, and Egypt then overland to Gaza. The route home led through Syria, the Austrian Empire and some of the German States. The group sought Jewish communities along the route to inquire about the readiness of these communities to accept Christ and, separately, their preparedness to return to Israel as prophesied in the Bible. Keith recounts the journey in his 1843 book The Land of Israel According to the Covenant with Abraham, with Isaac, and with Jacob. It was also in that book that Keith used the slogan that became popular with other Christian Restorationists, A land without a people for a people without a land.

=== Budapest ===
William Garden Blaikie, the nephew of Keith wrote this about his uncle:

I had another reason for being interested in Budapest. It was there that our mission to the Jews was begun, under the remarkable circumstances connected with the illness of my uncle, Dr. Keith of St. Cyrus, in 1839. It was on his return from the mission on behalf of the Jews, on which he had been sent by the Church of Scotland, that he was seized with serious illness in a hotel at Pest, where Miss Pardoe, author of The City of the Sultan, happened to be staying. Miss Pardoe was on friendly terms with the archduchess, Maria Dorothea, a Princess of the Wurtemberg family (Protestant), wife of the Viceroy of Hungary, an Austrian archduke, and mother of the Queen of the Belgians. This good lady had been praying earnestly that God would send some one to direct her how she might be useful to the people of Hungary, and when she heard of Dr. Keith, it occurred to her that he had been sent to Pest in answer to her prayers. She came to his hotel, and like the Good Samaritan, ministered to him with her own hand, and did all that could be done for his recovery. Then followed that splendid mission, of which Dr. John Duncan, the celebrated Christian philosopher, was the animating spirit, with men like Robert Smith, William Wingate, W. O. Allan and others as coadjutors; which bore such fruits as Adolph Saphir and Alfred Edersheim; which, after being suppressed, still flourishes under Dr. Andrew Moody; which in Duncan’s time drew to him rabbis and priests, men of all creeds; and on which there came such a blessing from Heaven as has never been equalled in any of our Jewish missions.

=== Return to Palestine ===
In 1844, accompanied by his son, Dr. George Skene Keith (1819–1910), he revisited Palestine, and was the first to take daguerreotype views of notable places there. They remained in Syria for five months, and travelled in different directions above a thousand miles, and along the coast from Gaza to Suedia, at the mouth of the Orontes. They visited Jerusalem, Hebron, Petra, Samaria, Gerash, Nazareth, Tiberias, Chorazin (the first time it had been visited by British travellers); discovered Zimrin, the ancient capital of the Zemaritis; visited Damascus, Laodicea (Latakia), Antioch, and many other important places. Dr. George Keith was the first to take daguerreotype views of scenes in Syria, from which the illustrations are given in prophecies relating to the restoration of the Jews to edition of the Evidences.

Two of Alexander Keith's sons were surgeons who set up a private hospital in Edinburgh and were members of the Photographic Society of Scotland.

Keith is one of a large number of Christians who campaigned for a restoration of the Jews to their ancient homeland. In 1843 he wrote: "Greece was given to the Greeks, and in seeking any government for Syria, may not a confederacy of kings ... give Judea to the Jews?"

== Death and legacy ==
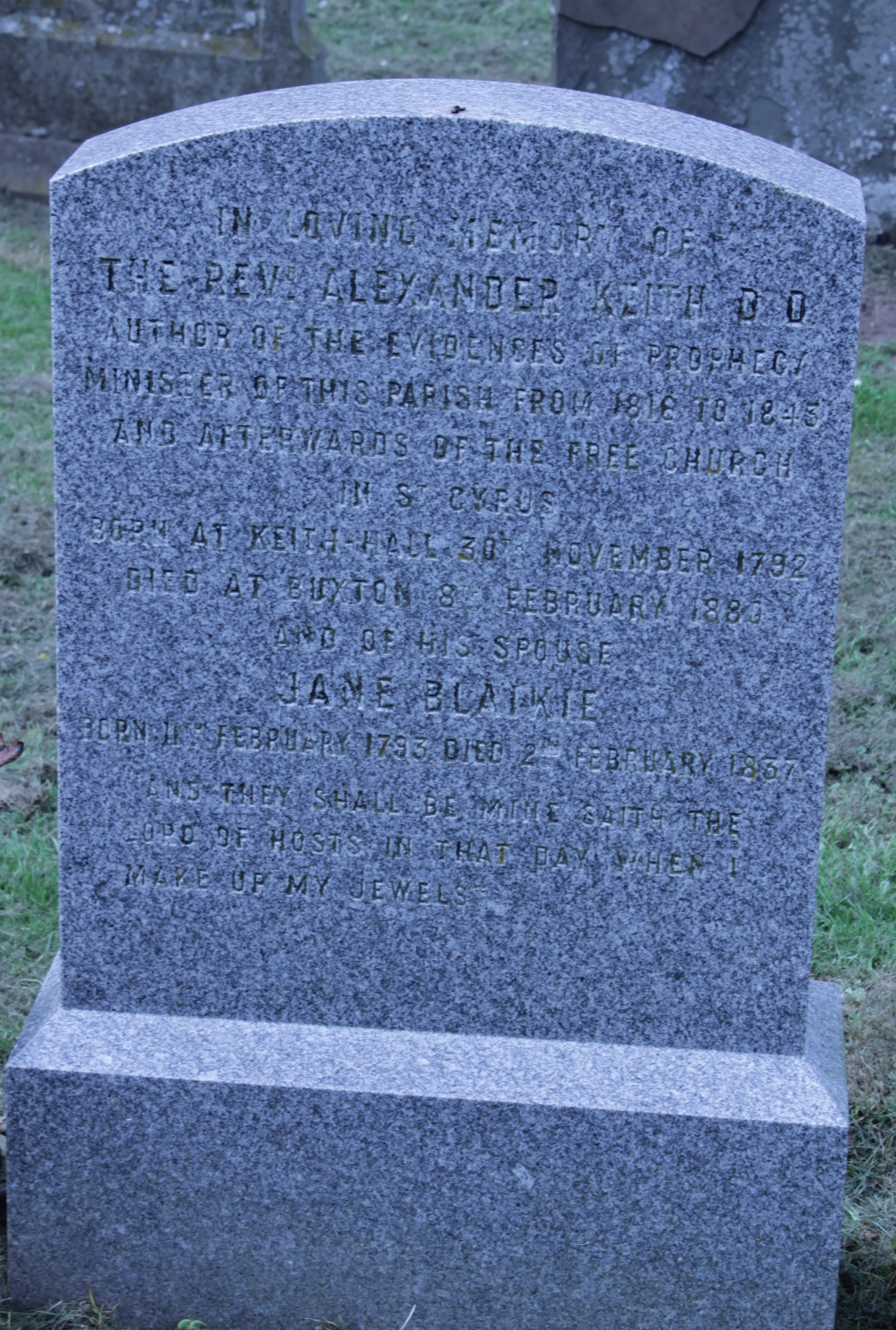
Memorial to Rev Alexander Keith in St Cyrus churchyard

The moderatorship of the Free Church of Scotland was repeatedly offered to Keith, but he declined it on account of his infirm health. He died at Aberdeen House, 56 West Street, Buxton, where he had resided for some years, on 8 February 1880, and was buried at Chinley, Chapel-en-le-Frith, Derbyshire, on 12 February.

Keith's first book on "The Fulfilment of Prophecy " appeared in 1823. It soon took its place as a standard treatise on the "Christian Evidences," and has passed through a vast number of editions. There are many languages into which the book has been translated. At subsequent periods Dr. Keith published various works on prophetical subjects, the most popular of which were "The Signs of the Times, illustrated by the Fulfilment of Historical Predictions," and "The Harmony of Prophecy," being a comparison of the Book of Revelation with other prophecies of Scripture. But none of his works reached the popularity of the "Evidences," of which Thomas Chalmers said that "it is recognised in our halls of theology as holding a high place in sacred literature, and it is found in almost every home, and known as a household word throughout the land."

== Family ==
He married 10 December 1816, Jane (died 2 February 1837), daughter of John Blackie, plumber, Aberdeen, (and sister of James Blaikie and Thomas Blaikie and had issue—

- Alexander, his assistant and successor
- George Skene Keith, M.D. (Edinburgh 1841), LL.D. (Aberdeen 1895), author of Plea for a Simpler Life, Plea for a Simpler Faith, Fads of an Old Physician, etc., born 11 March 1819, died 12 January 1910
- John, in Mercantile Marine, born 5 January 1821
- James, M.D. (Edinburgh 1845), born 22 January 1823
- Patrick, born 29 January 1825
- Thomas Keith, M.D. (Edinburgh 1848), LL.D. (Aberdeen 1894), an eminent surgeon and author, born 27 May 1827, died in London 9 October 1895
- David, M.D. (Edinburgh 1851), assistant surgeon, H.E I.C.S., born 9 March 1829
- Helen, born 18th Sept. 1831.

== Works ==
=== Sermons, articles and letters ===
- Letter to the Right Hon. Lord Bexley on the Collision between the Civil and the Church Courts in Scotland (London, 1841)
- A Sermon Preached at St Cyrus (with another by Dr Davidson) (Aberdeen, 1841)
- Origin of the Mission to the Jews at Pesth (1867)

=== Books ===
See lists

- Sketch of the Evidence from Prophecy; containing an account of those prophecies which were distinctly foretold, and which have been clearly or literally fulfilled. With an appendix, extracted from Sir Isaac Newton's Observations on the Prophecies, Edinburgh, 1823.
- Evidence of the Truth of the Christian Religion derived from the Literal Fulfilment of Prophecy; particularly as illustrated by the History of the Jews, and by the Discoveries of Recent Travellers, Edinburgh: Waugh & Innes, 1826 (2nd ed.) and many later editions. American edition - Philadelphia: Presbyterian Board of Publication, circa 1850 (395 pp).(Edinburgh, 1828, translated into Persian, Edinburgh, 1836) (See also Allibone's notes)
- Signs of the Times, as Denoted by the Fulfilment of Historical Predictions, Traced Down from the Babylonish Captivity to the Present Time, Edinburgh: William Whyte & Co. 1832. (383 pp). 2 vols. Republished 1837, 1842, 1847.....
- Demonstration of the Truth of the Christian Religion (Edinburgh, 1838)
- The Land of Israel According to the Covenant with Abraham, With Isaac, and With Jacob, Edinburgh: William Whyte & Co. 1844.(Edinburgh, 1843)
- An Examination of Mr Elliott's Theory of the First Six Seals (Edinburgh, 1847)
- Isaiah as it is: or, Judah and Jerusalem the subjects of Isaiah's Prophesying, Edinburgh, 1850.
- The Harmony of Prophecy; or Scriptural Illustrations of the Apocalypse, Edinburgh, 1851.
- Coming Events, or, Glimpses of the future; being an explanation of the prophecies relating to the destruction of Turkey and Egypt, the downfall of Rome, the war of Armageddon, and the invasion by Russia, etc., Dublin, 1853
- Scripture versus Stanley (London, 1859)
- The History and Destiny of the World and of the Church according to Scripture, London, 1861.

== See also ==
- Restoration of the Jews to the Holy Land
- Christian Zionism
- Church of Scotland
- A land without a people for a people without a land
- Disruption of 1843
