= Warburton Lectures =

The Warburton Lectures (until the end of the nineteenth century often called the Warburtonian Lectures) are a series of theology lectures held in Lincoln's Inn, London. They were established in 1768 with money given by William Warburton, and were intended to bring young divines to the notice of London audiences. The set topic was the proof of Christianity through prophecies.

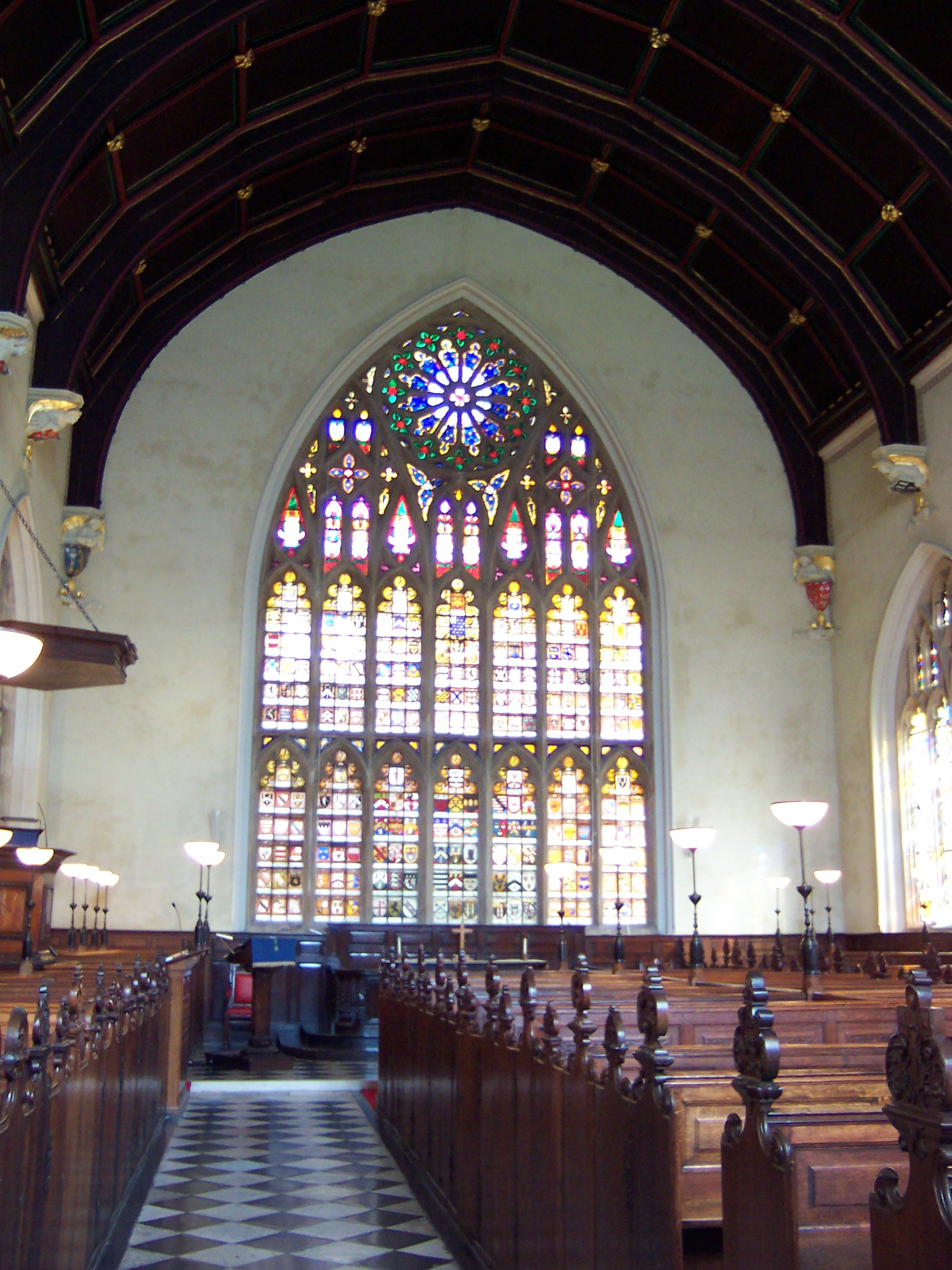
Lincoln's Inn Chapel, traditional venue for the lectures.

== Lecturers ==
- 1768–1772 Richard Hurd
- 1773–1776 Samuel Hallifax
- 1777–1780 Lewis Bagot
- 1781–1785 East Apthorp
- 1800–1804 Robert Nares
- 1807 Edward Pearson
- 1814–1815 Philip Allwood
- 1821–1825 John Davison Discourses on Prophecy, in which are considered its structure, use and inspiration (1824)
- 1829–1832 William Rowe Lyall: his Propædia Prophetica of 1840 returned to the same circle of ideas, though Lyall made a disclaimer that this work was not the text of the lectures
- 1833–1836 Frederick Nolan
- 1837–1840 Alexander McCaul
- 1841–1845 Benjamin Harrison Prophetic Outlines of the Christian Church and the Antichristian Power
- 1845 John Frederick Denison Maurice The Epistle to the Hebrews
- 1849–1853 Edward Bishop Elliott The Destinies and Perils of the Church, as Predicted in Scripture
- 1854–1858 William Goode
- 1866 Benjamin Morgan Cowie
- 1870–1874 Edwin Hamilton Gifford Voices of the Prophets
- 1874 James Woodhouse
- 1876–1880 Stanley Leathes Old Testament Prophecy: its witness as a record of divine foreknowledge
- 1880–1884 Alfred Edersheim Prophecy and History in Relation to the Messiah
- 1884–1885 John Gray Richardson
- 1886–1890 Alexander Francis Kirkpatrick The Doctrine of the Prophets
- 1890–1894 Rev. Francis Henry Woods (1850-1915, Chalfont St Peter 1888-1903) The Hope of Israel
- 1894–1898 Henry Wace Prophecy: Jewish and Christian
- 1898–1901 Herbert Edward Ryle
- 1907–1911 Michael George Glazebrook
- 1911–1915 A. Lukyn Williams, Gospel of Matthew
- 1915–1919 William Oscar Emil Oesterley
- 1919 Robert Henry Charles The Decalogue
- 1927–1931 David Capell Simpson
- 1931 William Ralph Inge God and the Astronomers
