= Islay Burns =

Scottish theologian and writer

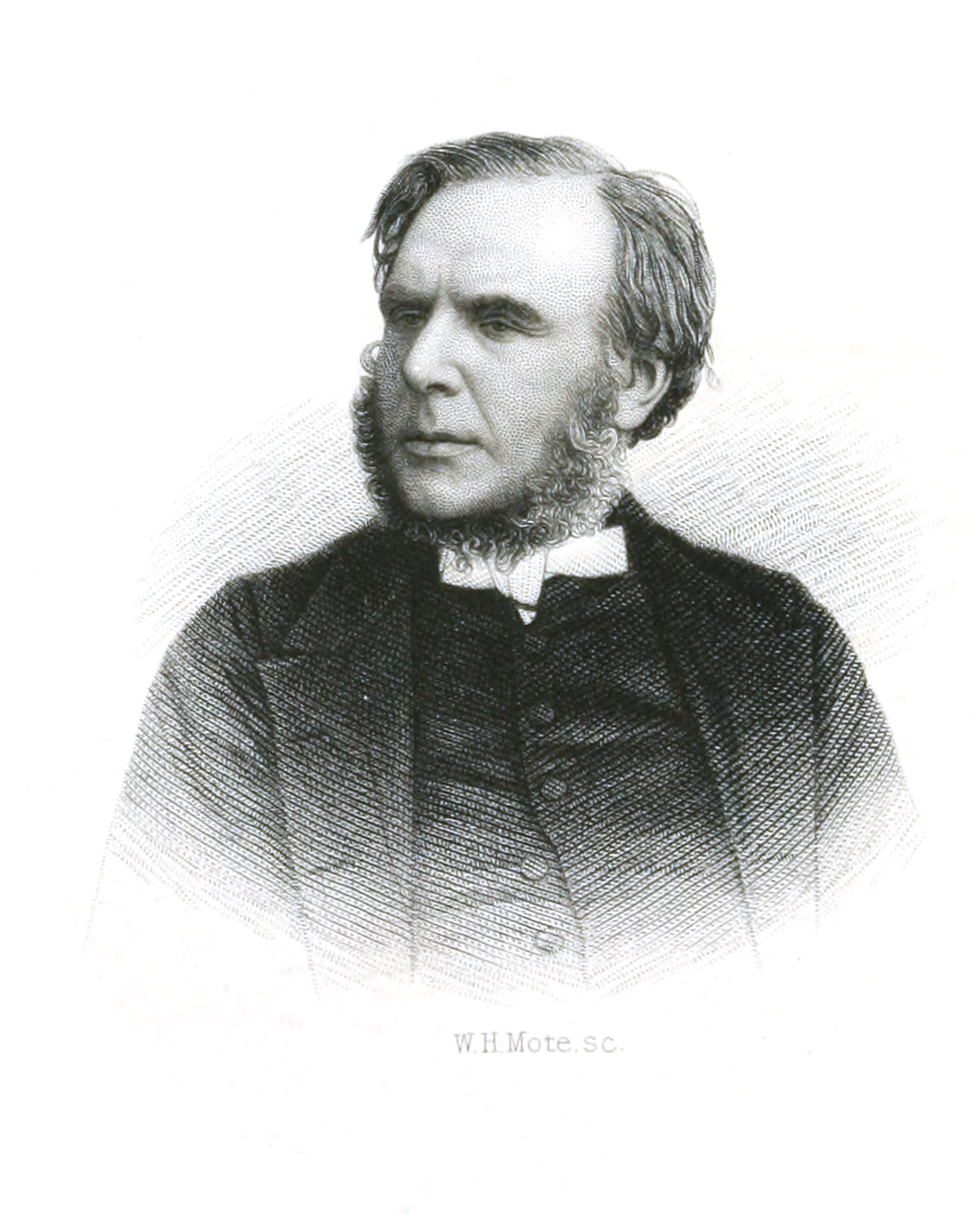
- Prof. of Apologetics and Systematic Theology
- Church: St. Peter's Free church, Dundee

Personal details
- Born: 16 January 1817
- Died: 20 May 1872 (aged 55)

Islay Burns (1817–1872) was a Scottish theologian and writer.

== Life ==
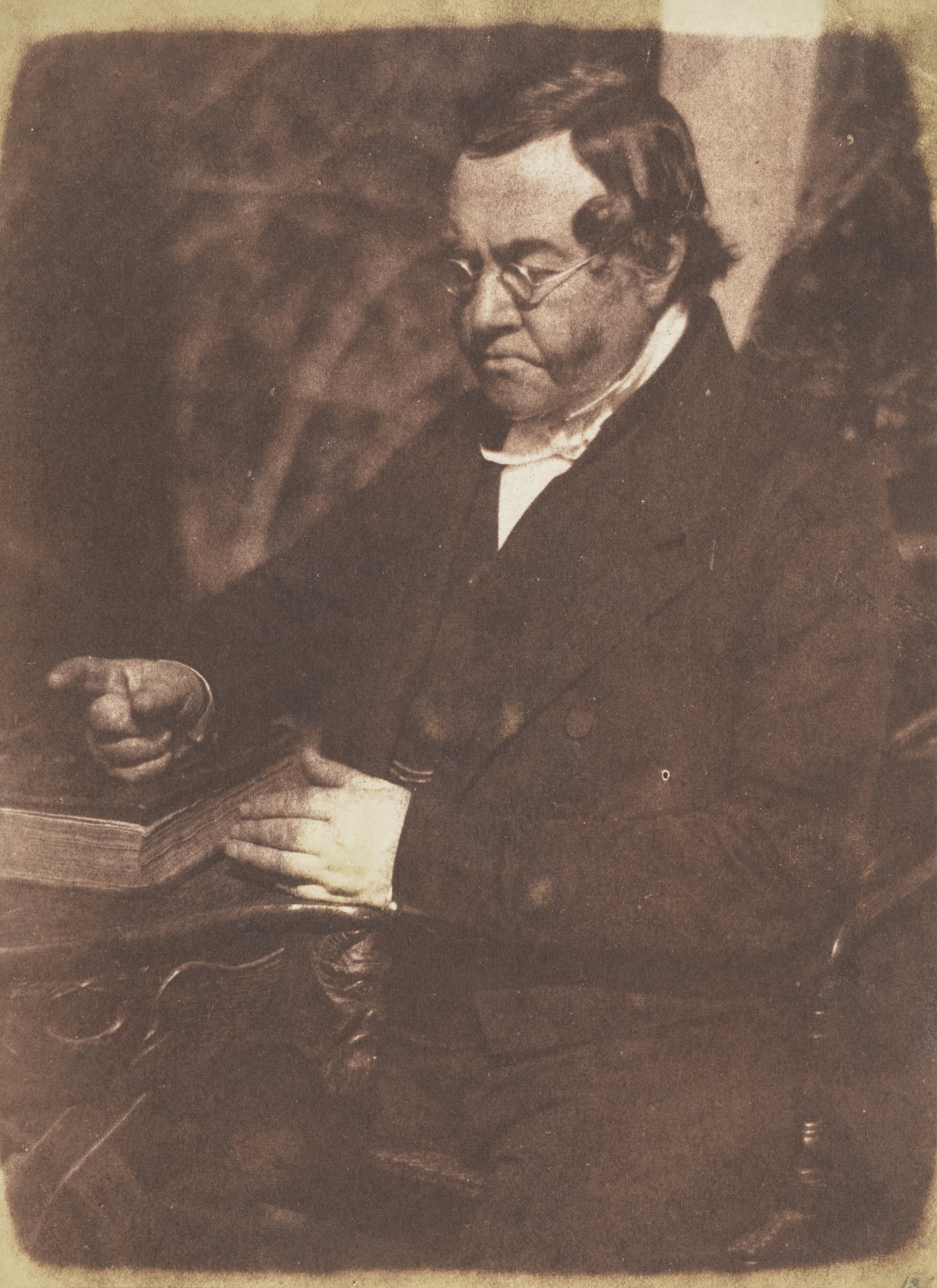
William Hamilton Burns by Hill & Adamson

Burns was born on 16 January 1817 at the manse of Dun in Forfarshire, the son of William Hamilton Burns, parish minister in the Church of Scotland, and his wife Elizabeth Chalmers. The family moved to Kilsyth near Glasgow in his youth.

He received the chief part of his education at the grammar school of Aberdeen, under Dr. James Melvin, a celebrated teacher of Latin, and then studied divinity at Marischal College and University of Aberdeen, and the University of Glasgow.

He was ordained in 1843 to the charge of St. Peter's Free church, Dundee, in succession to Robert Murray M'Cheyne, a man of eminent spirituality and power. In 1863 he received an honorary degree of D.D. from the University of Aberdeen, and in 1864 was chosen as Professor of Apologetics and Systematic Theology in the theological college of the Free Church, at Lynedoch Place in Glasgow. In this office he remained during the rest of his life. Burns was remarkable for a combination of evangelical fervour with width of culture and sympathy, a strong æsthetic faculty and a highly charitable spirit. To the diligent and successful discharge of his duties, first as a minister of the gospel and then as a professor, he added considerable literary activity.

He died at home 4 Sardinia Terrace in Glasgow.

== Publications ==
His chief writings were A Series of Essays on the Tractarian and other Movements in the Church of England, published in the British and Foreign Evangelical Review, History of the Church of Christ, with special reference to the delineation of faith and life, The Pastor of Kilsyth, which is a sketch of the life of his father and a memoir of his brother. A posthumous volume of Select Remains was published in 1874.

== Family ==
He was brother of William Chalmers Burns.

In 1845 he married Catharine Sarah Brown, sister of Prof David Brown; their eight children included Rev Islay Ferrier Burns (1854–1924).
