= George Skene Keith =

Scottish minister and writer (1752–1823)

George Skene Keith (6 November 1752 – 7 March 1823) was a Scottish minister and versatile writer.

== Life ==
The Keiths of Aquhorsk descended from Alexander Keith, third son of William Keith, 2nd Earl Marischal. The eldest son of James Keith, he was born in the Old House of Aquhorsk in Marr, near Aberdeen, on 6 November 1752. He took his degree from Marischal College and the University of Aberdeen in 1770, was licensed by the presbytery of Aberdeen on 14 July 1774.

Keith was presented by the commissioners for George Keith, 10th Earl Marischal, 9 May 1776, to the living of Keith-Hall and Kinkell, Caskieben, Aberdeen. A legal difficulty arose when, the following day, the Earl Marischal himself, then resident in Potsdam, gave a presentation to Thomas Tait, minister of Old Machar. After legal proceedings in the church courts and the court of session, the case was finally decided in Keith's favour by the House of Lords in April 1778 and he was ordained to the living on 14 May 1778. He received the degree of D.D. from Marischal College in May 1803. He was translated from Keith-Hall to Tulliallan, Perthshire, by George Keith Elphinstone, Viscount Keith, and admitted on 18 July 1822.

Keith was an active minister who cultivated his glebe to support his family. He died at Tulliallan House on 7 March 1823, aged 70, and was buried in the churchyard of Keith-Hall, his old parish. A tablet of white marble was erected to his memory by Aberdeenshire gentry.

== Works ==
Keith's major work was General View of the Agriculture of Aberdeenshire, London, 1811, for the Board of Agriculture surveys. In an appendix are Observations on British Grasses, and a Short Account of Two Journeys undertaken with a View to ascertain the Elevation of the principal Mountains in the Division of Marr. Other publications were:

- Sermons and Discourses on several Occasions, London, 1785.
- Tracts on Weights, Measures, and Coins, London, 1791.
- Tracts on the Reform of the British Constitution, Edinburgh, 1793.
- An Impartial and Comprehensive View of the Present State of Great Britain, London, 1797. A humorous appendix gives an allegorical representation of parts of the inquiry, as Sketches of the History of John Bull, Farmer and Manufacturer.
- Observations on the Sale of Corn by Weight, Aberdeen, 1797.
- Address … respecting Chapels of Ease, n.p. 1797 (anon.)
- Dissertation on the Excellence of the British Constitution (Blackwell prize dissertation), Aberdeen, 1800.
- Particular Examination of the new French Constitution, Aberdeen, 1801.
- Embarrassments affecting the Interests of Agriculture, Aberdeen, 1823.

Keith wrote the account of Keith-Hall and Kinkell for Sir John Sinclair's Statistical Account of Scotland (1791). He edited the Lectures on Ecclesiastical History by his friend George Campbell, with a memoir (1800). He published also sermons and addresses.

=== Weights and measures ===
Keith investigated methods for equalising weights and measures, and supported the adoption of the seconds pendulum as a standard. His plan was put before a committee of parliament in January 1790 by Sir John Riggs Miller, who intended to bring in a bill on the subject; but the dissolution of parliament intervened. Sir Joseph Banks praised Keith's pamphlet Synopsis of a System of Equalization of Weights and Measures of Great Britain 1791. In 1817 Keith published Different Methods of establishing an Uniformity of Weights and Measures, London.

=== Malt tax ===
In 1798 Keith gave evidence before the Scottish distillery committee of the House of Commons on the malt tax, an excise duty. In 1799, at the request of the committee and of the Scottish board of excise, he made a series of experiments in distillation; his results were printed in the appendix to the committee's report, 1798–9. He made further experiments in 1802–3 for the commissioners of excise in Scotland.

In 1803 Keith again gave evidence before a committee of the House of Commons on the proportion of the malt tax levied in England and Scotland, and in 1804 he took part in a discussion on distilling experiments which had been made for the Scottish commissioners. The House of Commons voted Keith £500 for his experiments.

In 1800 Keith drew up the heads of a new corn bill, which was passed to the corn committee of the House of Lords by Sir William Pulteney.

== Family ==
Keith married, on 26 August 1783, Helen, daughter of James Simpson, merchant, of Old Meldrum. She died on 8 January 1798. They had four sons and three daughters.

- The eldest son, James, born on 18 January 1788, became colonel in the British army, and died during the retreat from Cabul on 19 October 1839.
- Alexander, born on 13 November 1792, is known as a writer on biblical prophecy.
- John, born on 7 May 1797, was ordained assistant and successor at Keith-Hall on 3 May 1821, and succeeded to the charge on his father's translation. He wrote the account of the parish for the new Statistical Account of Scotland (1845).
