= William Chalmers Burns =

Scottish missionary to China (1815 – 1868)

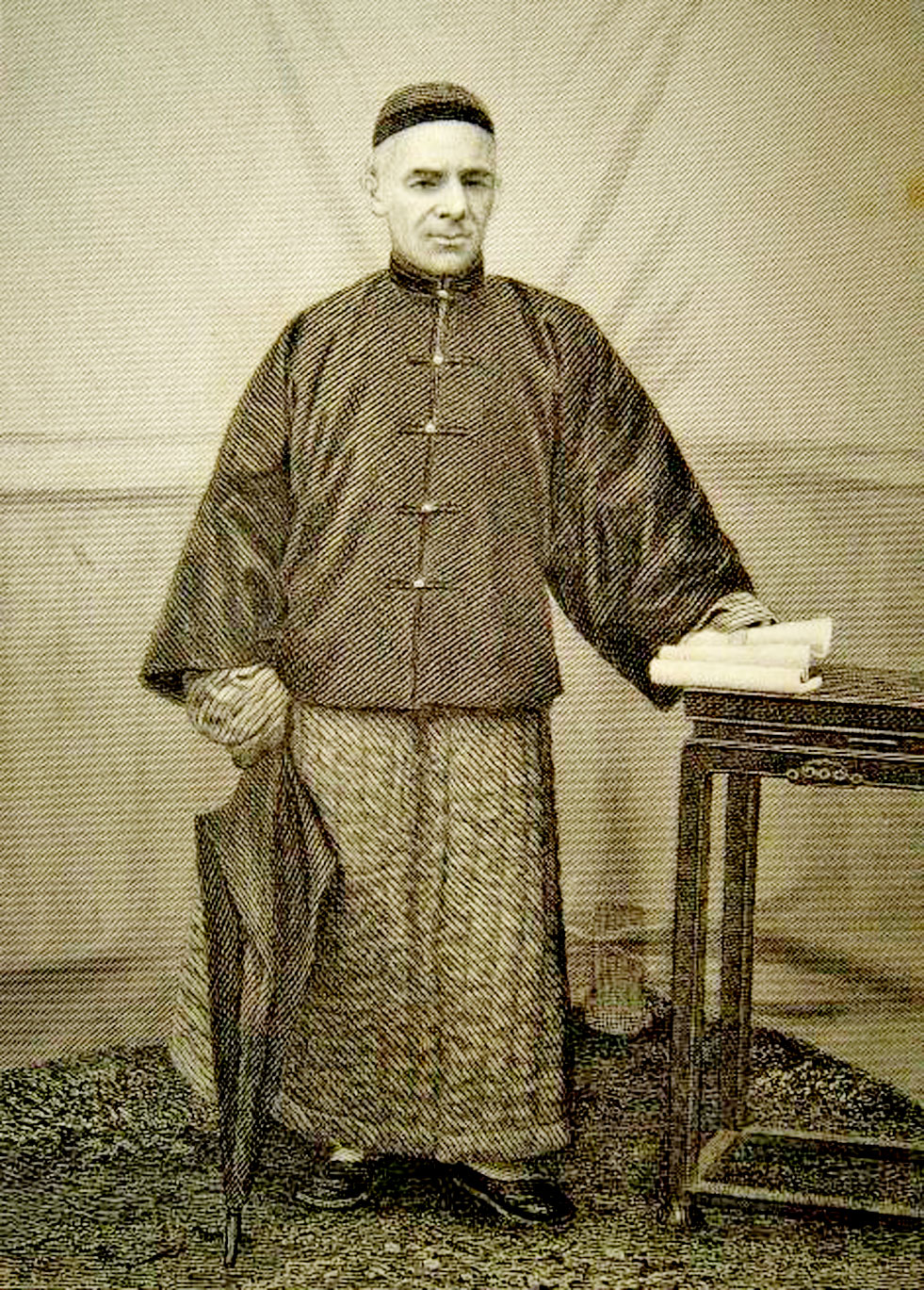
- Missionary to China
- Born: 1815; Dun, Forfarshire, Scotland
- Died: 1868 (aged 52–53); Niú Zhuāng, China

William Chalmers Burns (宾惠廉, 1 April 1815 – 4 April 1868) was a Scottish evangelist and missionary to China with the English Presbyterian Mission who originated from Kilsyth, North Lanarkshire. He was the coordinator of the overseas missions for the English Presbyterian church. He became a well-known evangelist through his participation in two periodic Anglo-American religious revivals.

== Biography ==
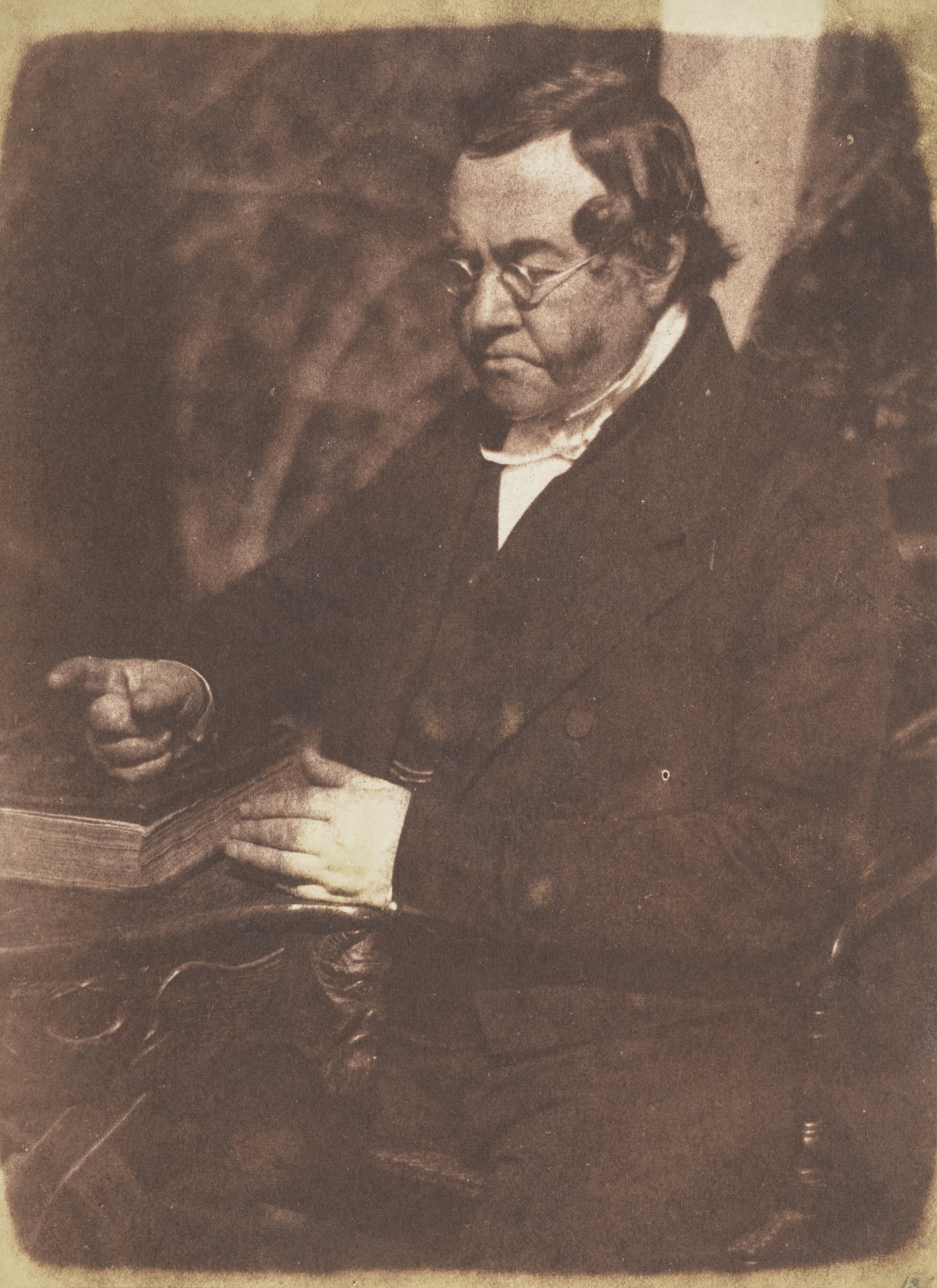
William Hamilton Burns by Hill & Adamson

Burns was brought up in a well-to-do household. He was born in Forfarshire, the third son of a local church minister, William Hamilton Burns (1779–1859) and Elizabeth Chalmers (1784–1879). At age 17, Burns's faith was strengthened through tragedy, and he subsequently commenced theological training at Marischal College in Aberdeen, and at the University of Glasgow's Divinity Hall. (His brother Islay, author of Memoirs, was later a professor there).

During a revival meeting, he encountered an experience in which it became apparent that God had particularly appointed him into His service. By 1839, age 24, Burns had obtained the licence to preach from the Glasgow Presbytery.

While still in his homeland of Scotland, he experienced, together with the preacher Robert Murray M'Cheyne, genuine revival meetings. It was one of the tools from which the great spiritual revivals in his home town of Kilsyth resulted, that took place from July 7, 1839. Burns preached at St. Peter's in Dundee while Robert Murray M'Cheyne was away on a mission to the Jews in Palestine. The days of revival also deeply affected Dundee and continued after M'Cheyne returned to St. Peter's in November 1839.

In 1843 Burns sided with Thomas Chalmers in the disruption within the Church of Scotland. In 1845 he visited Canada with his uncle, Robert Burns, minister from Paisley, and the younger Burns preached for the Free Church cause in many communities, including Montreal, Canada East, and in Glengarry County, where he preached in English, Gaelic and French. He later travelled into Canada West, although there was interest in his ministry in France. His uncle remained in Canada, becoming minister of Knox Church, Toronto, and a professor at Knox College, University of Toronto.

In 1847, Burns went to the Chinese empire via British Hong Kong; during this long ship journey, he spent a lot of time studying the Chinese language. He began his missionary service during the late Qing dynasty in British Hong Kong and went on to preach in such locations as Shantou, Xiamen and Beijing.

In 1855 Burns met Hudson Taylor, and the two worked together for quite some time. Both had the courage to advance into the Chinese interior. Taylor regarded Burns as one of his spiritual mentors and wrote about the depth of Burns's prayer life. Taylor, however, influenced Burns in the way in which he sought to contextualize his ministry by breaking with missionary tradition to wear Chinese clothing while evangelizing in China's interior. During his 20 years of preaching the gospel in China, Burns also spent a short period wrongly imprisoned in Guangzhou. One of William Burns's well-known quotes was: "Always be ready" (1 Peter 3:15). In 1868, Burns died after a short illness in Yingkou (Niuzhuang), Liaoning Province.

== Family ==
He was the son of Rev. William Hamilton Burns and Elizabeth (died 20 June 1879), daughter of James Chalmers, proprietor of the Aberdeen Journal, Aberdeen, and Margaret Douglas of Tilquhillie. Amongst his siblings was James, a Free Church Minister, Islay, a Scottish theologian and writer, and Walter, a music publisher in Belfast.

== Publications ==
- Translation of The Pilgrim’s Progress (classical Chinese)
- Translation of The Pilgrim’s Progress (modern Chinese)
- Memoir (with his brother Islay)
