= Adolph Saphir =

Hungarian Jew and Christian convert

Adolph Sapir
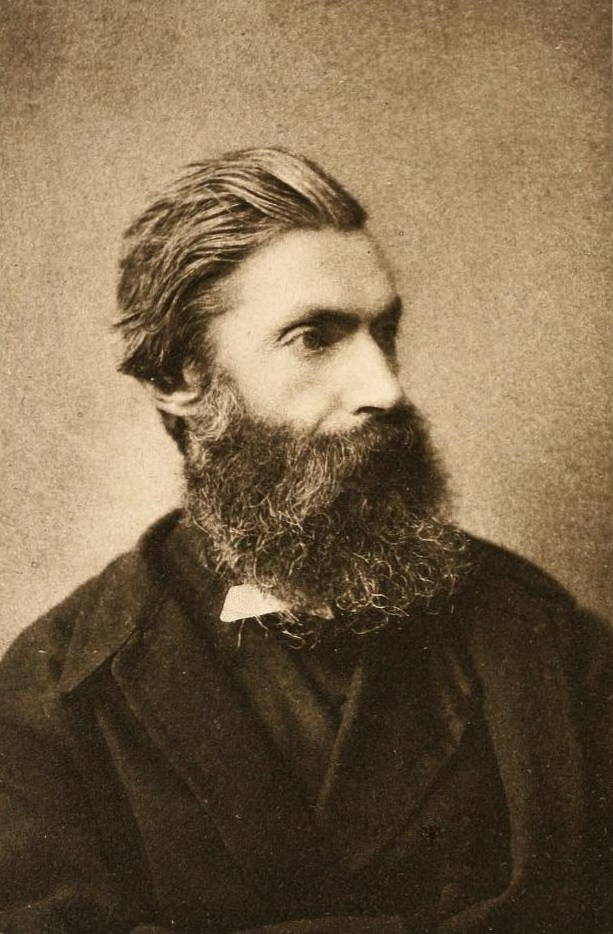

Personal details
- Born: 26 September 1831
- Died: 4 April 1891 (aged 59)

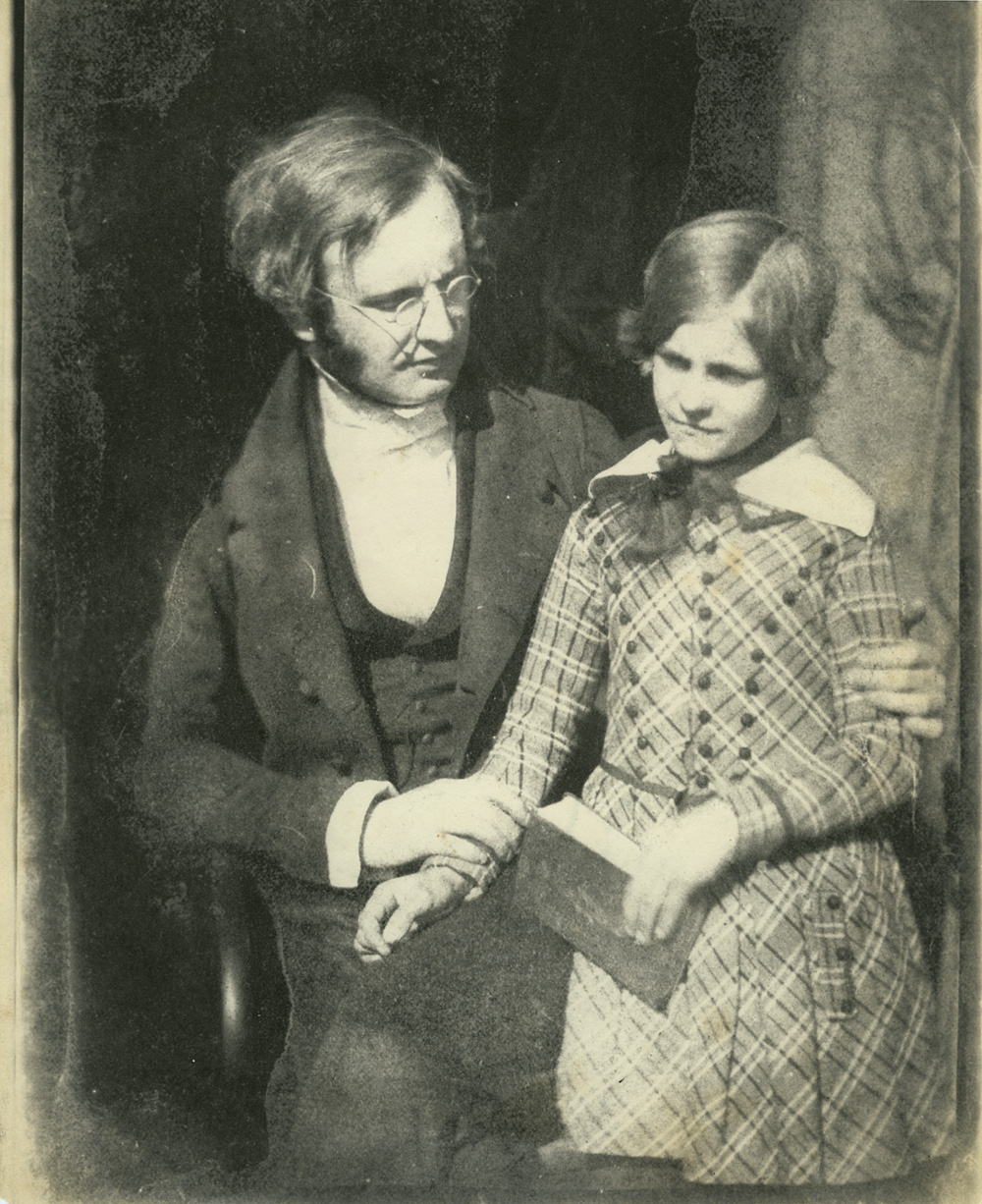
Adolph Saphir and his Teacher, by Hill & Adamson, 1840s.

Aaron Adolph Saphir (26 September 1831 – 4 April 1891) was a Hungarian Jew who converted to Christianity and became a Jewish Presbyterian missionary.

== Life ==
He was born in eastern Budapest (Pest) on 26 September 1831, the son of Israel Saphir, a Jewish merchant and brother of the poet, Moritz Gottlieb Saphir. Adolph's mother was Henrietta Bondij. As a child he was reportedly of a delicate constitution, and there were initially concern that he would not survive infancy.

In 1843, his family converted to Christianity through the Jewish mission of the Free Church of Scotland. In the autumn of 1843 his father sent him to train as a Christian minister for the Free Church of Scotland at New College, Edinburgh. This proved impractical due to his age and lack of English. He attended a Gymnasium in Berlin from 1844 to 1848 much improving his English. From 1848 he studied at Glasgow University graduating MA in 1854.

Saphir travelled to Edinburgh with Rabbi Duncan and Alfred Edersheim. He then studied at the Marischal College, Aberdeen. He took his theology course at New College, Edinburgh. In 1854, Saphir was appointed a missionary to the Jews. He worked briefly in Hamburg before moving to England where he became a minister of the Presbyterian Church of England, and served at Laygate Church in South Shields, at St Mark's in Greenwich, and at Trinity Church South Street, Notting Hill. In 1880 he was forced to resign his pastorate at Notting Hill due to ill health. A measure of recovery followed, so that he was able preach for a while at St. John's Church, Kensington, and to supply the vacant pulpit of Belgrave Presbyterian Church, West Halkin Street, for six months. This was followed by a call to become Pastor there, and he was inducted to the ministry of Belgrave on 28 June 1882. As he was not quite able to undertake all of the duties of the pastorate, a generous donor provided money to pay an assistant minister. He resigned from Belgrave Church in May 1888. Saphir received an honorary Doctor of Divinity from the University of Glasgow in 1878.

Following his retirement, Dr. Saphir continued to preach as his health permitted. He spent the winter of 1890–91 at Bournemouth, where he supplied the pulpit of the Presbyterian Church. Dr. Saphir died of angina pectoris on 3 April 1891, just three days after the death of his wife on 31 March.

== Publications ==
- The Hidden Life
- The Divine Unity of Scripture
- Jesus and the Sinner
- Christ and the Church
- The Jews as Custodians and Witnesses
- Christ and the Scriptures
- Christian Perfection: An Address
- Christ Crucified
- The Epistle to the Hebrews (1874)
- The Sinner and the Saviour
- The Lord's Prayer (1872)
- The Compassion of Jesus
- The Prophecies of Daniel and the Revelation (Edinburgh, 1874), being a translation of Karl August Auberlen (Der Prophet Daniel und die Offenbarung Johannis, (Basel, 1854)

== Family ==
Adolph Saphir's siblings were also involved in the Hebrew Christian movement and missionary activities: Philipp, whose letters and diaries Adolph edited, ran a mission school in Budapest; Johanna taught at the school and later married Charles Andrew Schönberger, co-founder of the Hebrew Christian Testimony to Israel; and Maria Dorothea married the noted Hebrew Christian preacher Carl Schwartz. In 1854 Adolph married Sarah Owen from Dublin. They had one daughter who died young; Sarah died four days before Adolph.
