= Alexander Black (theologian) =

Scottish theologian (1789–1864)

The Reverend Alexander Black
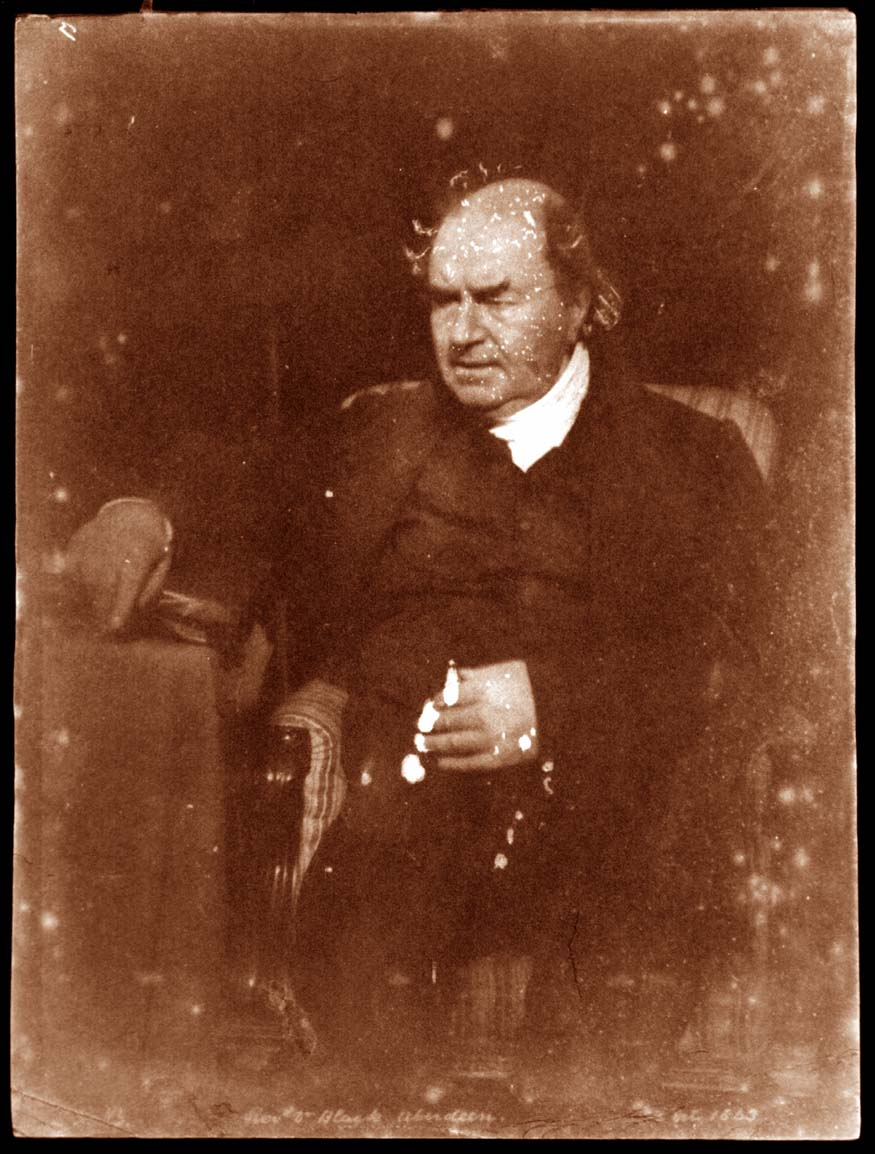
- Alexander Black by Hill & Adamson

Personal details
- Born: 18 January 1789
- Died: 27 January 1864 (aged 75)

Minister of Tarves
- In office 1 April 1818 – 20 October 1831

Divinity Chair, Marischal College, Aberdeen
- In office 20 October 1831 – 14 June 1843

Professor of New Testament Exegesis, New College, Edinburgh
- In office 1844–1856

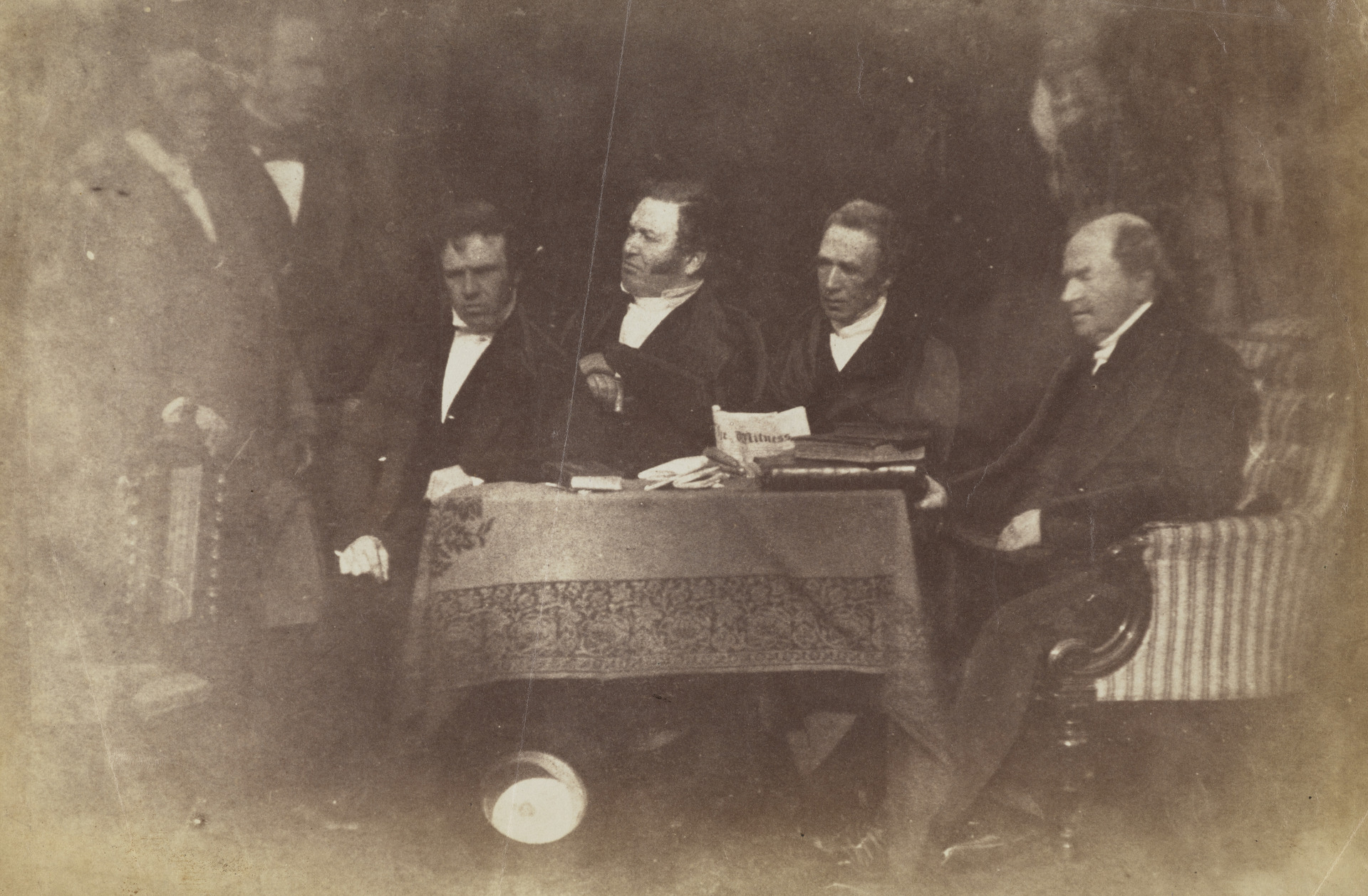
Aberdeen Presbytery by Hill & Adamson. There's a likeness of Black reproduced in Watt.

Alexander Black (18 January 1789 – 27 January 1864) was a Scottish Presbyterian minister and professor of Exegetical Theology in New College, Edinburgh. Black was a native of Aberdeen, where he received his education, first at the Grammar School, and afterwards at Marischal College. After passing through the Divinity Hall, he was appointed assistant to Dr Ross, East Church, Aberdeen, and he was subsequently presented to the Parish Church of Tarves, as successor to Duncan Mearns. Upon the death of David Brown, Black in 1831 became his successor in the Professorship of Divinity in Marischal College. His knowledge of Hebrew and the cognate tongues procured him, in 1839, a place in a deputation sent by the General Assembly to Palestine. At the disruption, Black attached himself to the Free Church, and in 1844 was appointed to the chair of Exegetical Theology in the New College, Edinburgh, from which he retired in 1856. He was a versatile linguist who, it is said, could converse in nineteen languages and correspond in twelve.

== Early life and education ==
Alexander Black was born in Aberdeen on 18 January 1789. His father, John Black, owned a few fields and carried on the business of a gardener. Alexander was educated at Aberdeen Grammar School and Marischal College, and after studying medicine (M.A. 1 April 1807) devoted himself to preparation for the ministry. After completing the requisite course of study in the Divinity Hall, he made his first stated appearance in the pulpit as assistant to Dr Ross of the East Church, Aberdeen, in whose family he lived as tutor to his son, Alexander Ross, with whom he travelled on the continent.

== Early ministry ==
Black's abilities and application to study were so remarkable that, when a vacancy occurred in the chair of divinity in King's College, Aberdeen, he offered himself as a candidate, and went through the examinations prescribed to the applicants. His fellow-candidates were Dr Mearns, then minister of Tarves, who was successful, and Dr Love, of Glasgow. Young Black, though unsuccessful, attracted the attention of the Earl of Aberdeen, who on the promotion of Mearns to the chair presented him to the parish of Tarves, and there Black was ordained on 1 April 1818.

== University professor in Aberdeen ==
From Tarves Black was transferred to Aberdeen on 20 October 1831 as professor of divinity in Marischal College. His great powers as a linguist and his very large and particular acquaintance with rabbinical literature caused him to be selected in 1839 by a committee of the General Assembly of the Church of Scotland, along with the Alexander Keith, St. Cyrus, Robert Murray McCheyne, Dundee, and Andrew Bonar, Collace, to go to the East to make inquiries as to the expediency of beginning a mission to the Jews. After a good many difficulties and trials Black and his brethren returned to Scotland, and an interesting report of their mission was presented to the general assembly.

On Black's return from the Holy Land, he found his most amiable and beloved wife in the last stage of an illness; he arrived only in time to see her expire. This bereavement cast a shadow over the remainder of his life.

== University professor in Edinburgh ==
At the disruption of 1843, joining the Free Church, he gave up his chair at Aberdeen and removed to Edinburgh, where he was connected with the New College. Referring to the linguistic powers of Black and his colleague, John Duncan (Colloquia Peripatetica), Thomas Guthrie used to say that ‘they could speak their way to the wall of China;’ yet no corresponding products of their learning were given to the public. Owing, however, to various causes, he never held the same position, or exercised the same influence for good there as he had done in Aberdeen. The arrangements connected with his class were not to his mind. His advanced years and reserved sensitive disposition hindered him from overcoming the difficulties in which he felt himself placed, as well as from forming new friendships to sustain him under them; and in 1856 he retired from his professorial charge.

== Death and legacy ==
He died at 16 Claremont Crescent in Edinburgh's New Town on 27 June 1864.

== Jewish mission ==
In 1838 the General Assembly appointed a committee to consider the subject of a Mission to the Jews and a deputation was appointed to visit the chief Jewish communities on the Continent and in the East. The deputation comprised: Alexander Keith, D.D., minister of St Cyrus; Alexander Black, D.D., Professor of Divinity, Marischal College; Andrew Bonar, minister of Collace; Robert Murray M'Cheyne, minister of St Peter's, Dundee, and Robert Wodrow, a Glasgow elder. Their Report led the Assembly of 1840 to adopt a Jewish Mission as one of the greater Schemes of the Church. As the members of the Deputation were travelling across the desert from Egypt to Palestine, Black fell from his camel and was rendered unconscious. He recovered sufficiently to accompany his colleagues to Jerusalem and other places in Palestine. But the heat of summer and the roughness of the mode of travel obliged Black and Keith to proceed homewards by the shortest route through Hungary, to the nearest continental port. At Pesth, Keith was seized with an illness so serious that his life was despaired of. Black also was taken ill, and the hapless condition of the two Scottish strangers evoked sympathy in the city. Their situation became known to the Protestant Archduchess Marie Dorothea, whose husband was Viceroy of Hungary. She ministered to them personally, heard the story of their mission, and encouraged them to think of the Jews at Pesth, assuring them that should the Church of Scotland decide to plant a mission there, she would aid them to the utmost of her power. Thus it was that the first Jewish Mission of the Church of Scotland had its origin in Hungary — at Pesth and Jassy, on 21 August 1841.

== Works ==
- On the Progressive Diffusion of Divine Knowledge (Aberdeen, 1824)
- Address at Annual Examination of Merton's English Classes (Aberdeen, 1838)
- The Exegetical Study of the Original Scriptures Considered in Connexion with the Training of Theological Students: In a Letter to the Rev. Thomas M'Crie, D.D., LL. D., Moderator of the Free Church of Scotland (Edinburgh 1856)

== Family ==
He married 9 November 1826, Rachel, daughter of Alexander Booth, merchant, Aberdeen, and had issue —

- Alexander, born 20 November 1827
- George Hamilton Gordon, born 21 November 1829
- Helen Forsyth, born 26 April 1831.
- Rachel Ann, died 5 June 1836.
