= Andrew Bonar =

Minister of the Free Church of Scotland

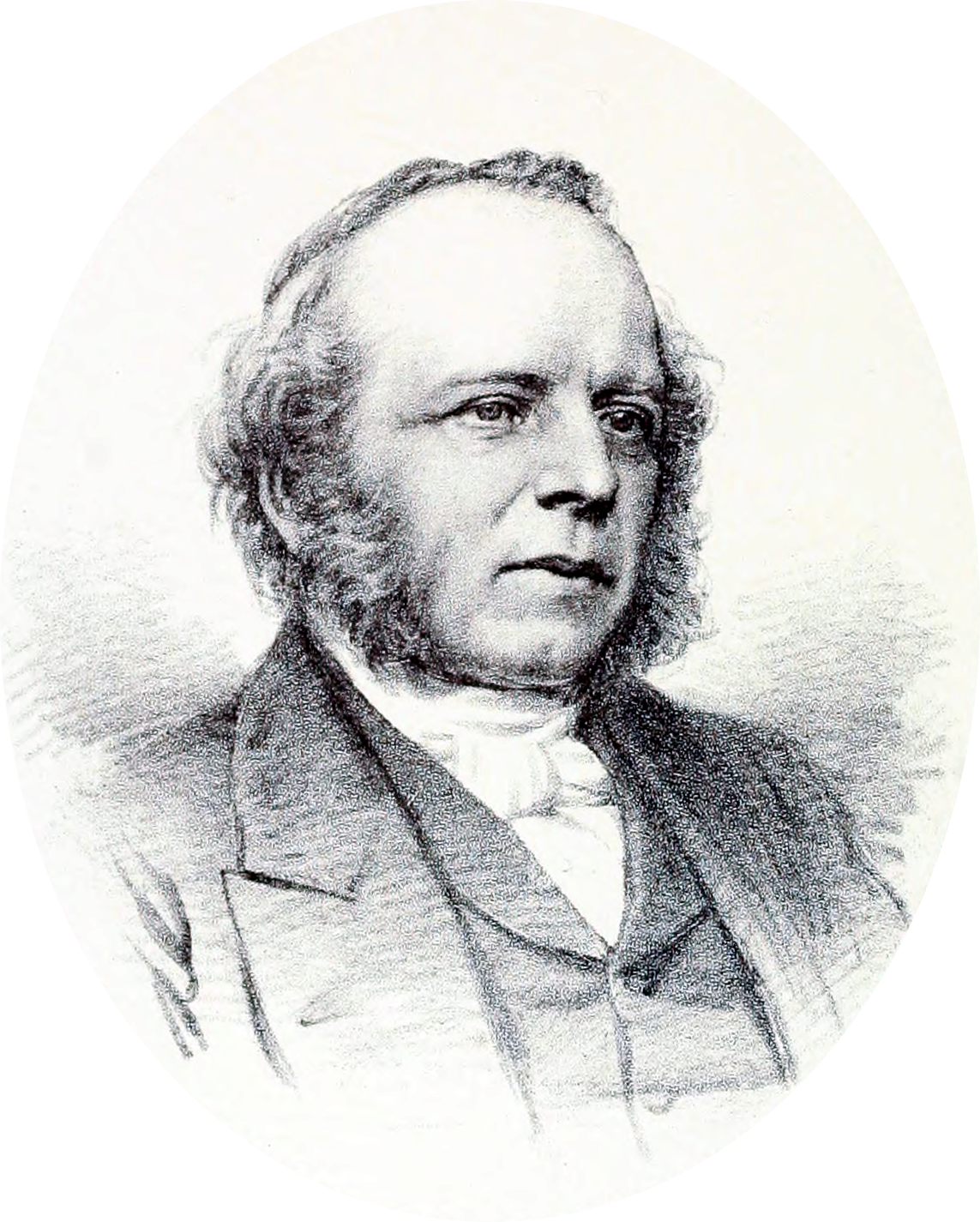
- Andrew Bonar from Disruption Worthies

Personal details
- Born: 29 May 1810
- Died: 30 December 1892 (aged 82)

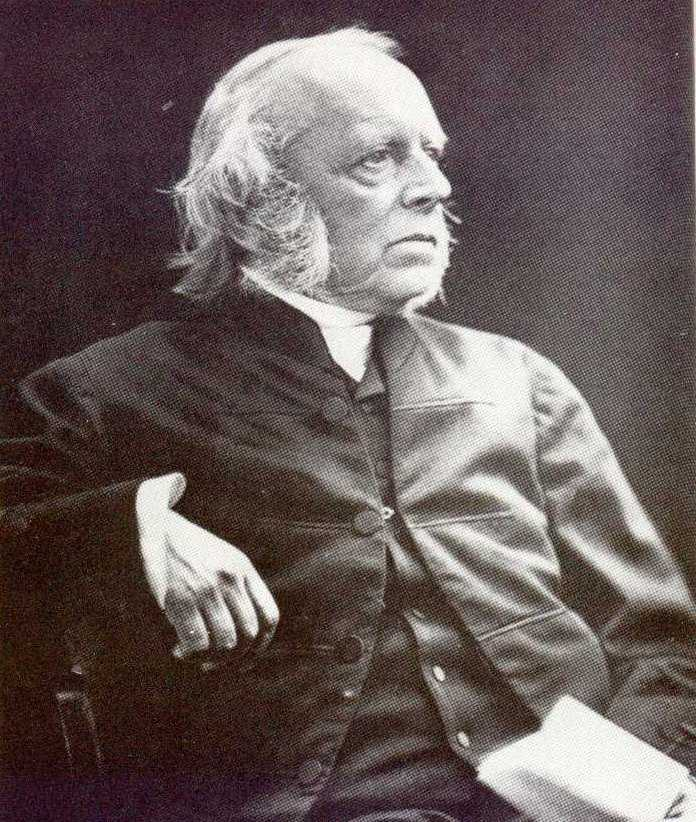
Dr. Andrew A. Bonar also printed in "The Sea of Galilee Mission of the Free Church of Scotland". Bonar and M'Cheyne travelled with two older ministers, Dr. Alexander Black and Dr. Alexander Keith

Andrew Alexander Bonar (29 May 1810 in Edinburgh – 30 December 1892 in Glasgow) was a minister of the Free Church of Scotland, a contemporary and acquaintance of Robert Murray M'Cheyne and youngest brother of Horatius Bonar.

== Life ==
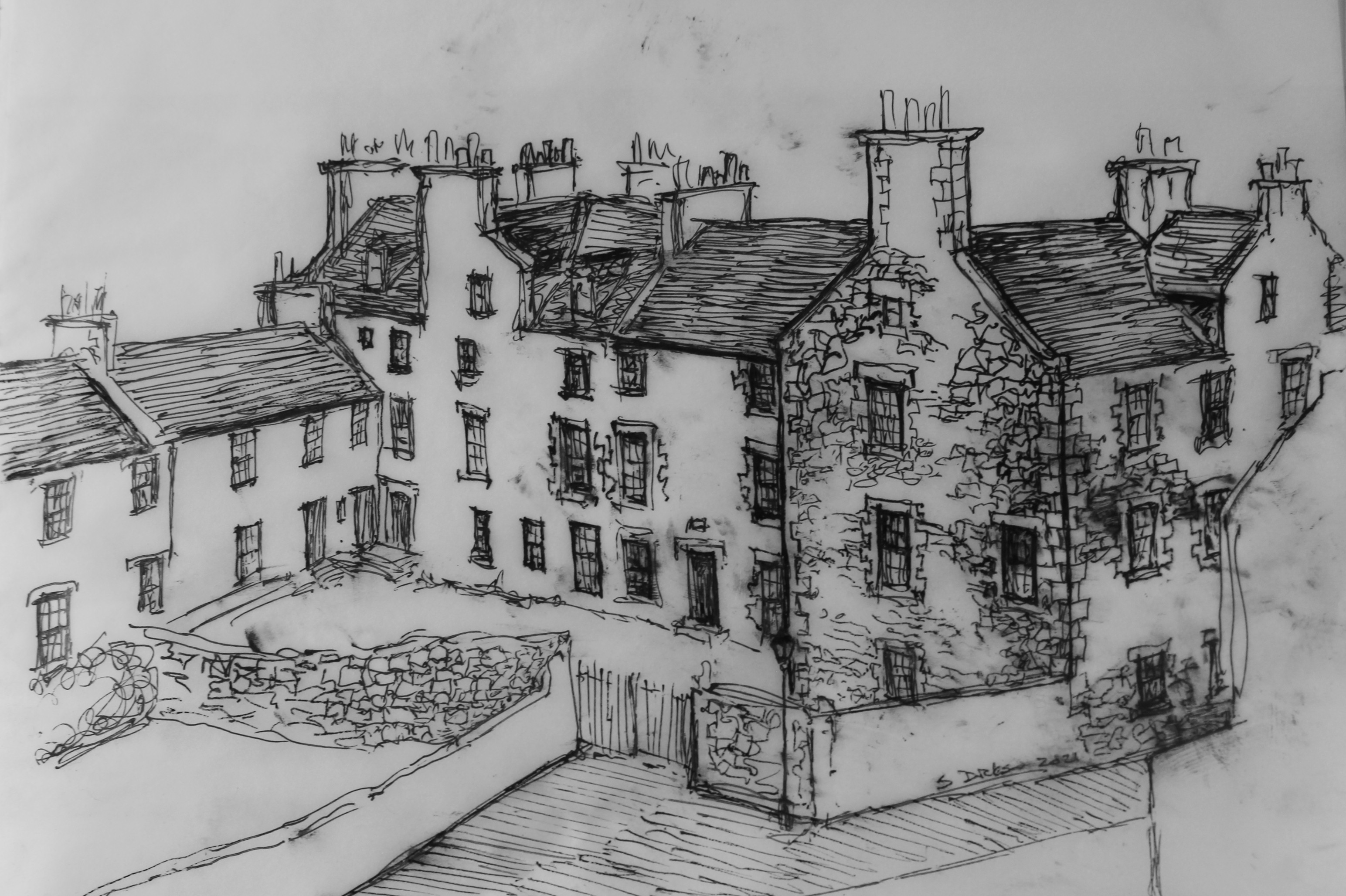
Paterson's Court, Broughton, Edinburgh c. 1850

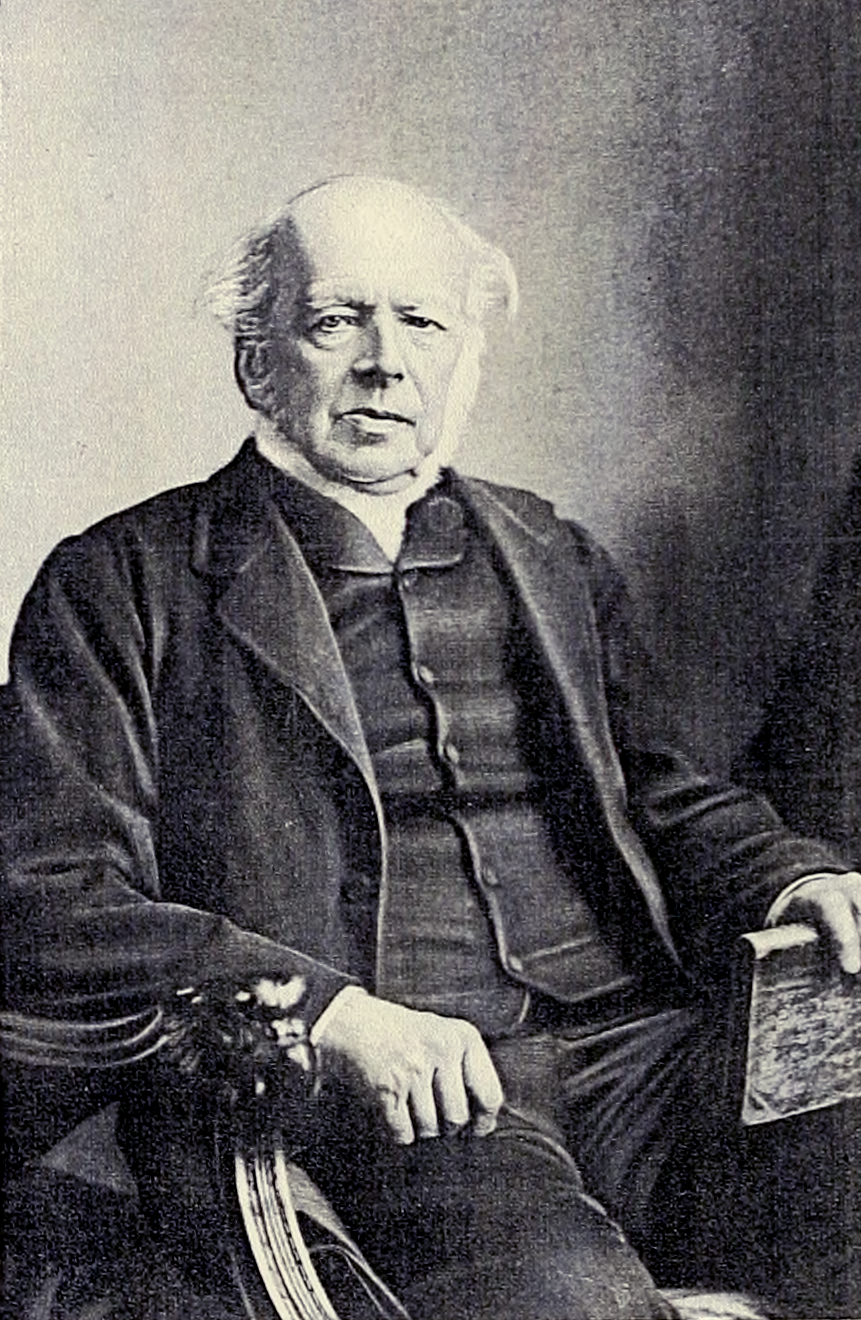
Andrew Bonar from autobiography

He was born at Paterson's Court in the Broughton district of Edinburgh, the son of James Bonar (1758–1821), a solicitor with the Excise, and his wife Marjory Pyott Maitland (1753–1834). He was younger brother to James Bonar and Horatius Bonar.

Andrew Bonar studied divinity at the University of Edinburgh from 1831 and was ordained in 1835. His first position was as minister at Collace in Perthshire, from 1838 to 1856 (both in the Church of Scotland and the Free Church of Scotland). With Robert Murray McCheyne he visited Palestine in 1839 to inquire into the condition of the Jews there. Bonar joined the Free Church of Scotland in 1843. He served as minister of Finnieston Free Church, Glasgow, from 1856 till his death. In 1874, the University of Edinburgh conferred on him the degree of Doctor of Divinity. He was the Moderator of the Free Church's General Assembly for 1878/79.

Bonar was identified with evangelical and revival movements and adhered to the doctrine of premillennialism. During the visit of Dwight L. Moody to Britain in 1874 and 1875, Moody was warmly welcomed by Bonar, despite the latter receiving considerable criticism from other Calvinist ministers in the Free Church.

He died at his home, 20 India Street in Glasgow, on 30 December 1892. He is buried in Sighthill Cemetery in north Glasgow.

Paterson Court was demolished in 1938, and his Glasgow house in the 1960s.

== Family ==
He married on 4 April 1848, Isabella (died 14 October 1864), youngest daughter of James Dickson, stationer, Edinburgh, and had issue —

- Isabella Renwick, born 19 October 1850 (married 26 September 1883, William M. Oatts, Secretary, Y.M.C.A., Glasgow)
- James, born 27 September 1852
- Marjory, born 23 December 1854, died 16 January 1918
- Andrew Alexander, born 23 March 1858, died 1 April 1860
- Jane Christian, born 18 June 1861 (married 2 August 1893, David Martin Maclntyre, minister of Finnieston United Free Church)
- Mary Elizabeth, born 24 September 1864, died 20 March 1897.

== Works ==
- A Narrative of a Mission of Inquiry to the Jews from the Church of Scotland in 1839 (Edinburgh, 1842) ISBN 1-85792-258-1
- Memoir and Remains of Robert Murray McCheyne (1845) ISBN 0-85151-084-1
- "The Biography of Robert Murray M'Cheyne"
- Commentary on Leviticus (1846) ISBN 0-85151-086-8
- Redemption Drawing Nigh, a defence of the premillennial advent (1847)
- The Gospel Pointing to the Person of Christ (1852)
- The Development of the Antichrist (1853) online at The Development of Antichrist
- The Life and Labours of Asahel Nettleton, with Bennet Tyler (1854) ISBN 0-85151-701-3
- The Visitor's Book of Texts or The Word Brought Near the Sick (Edinburgh, 1856) ISBN 978-1-84871-071-9
- Christ and his Church in the Book of Psalms (1859) ISBN 1-899003-65-7
- Bonar also edited Samuel Rutherford's Letters (1863); Letters of Samuel Rutherford, Religious Tract Society, London 1891 and wrote many tracts, pamphlets, and minor biographies.
- His daughter Marjory edited his Diary and Letters, his Reminiscences, Heavenly Springs (ISBN 0-85151-479-0) (Portions selected from his diary, letters, and sermons), and Wayside Wells (Thoughts for Sabbath evenings, selected from his writings and sermons).
- in-print publications include containing the Diary and Letters and the Reminiscences is:
- Bonar, Andrew A (1984). Bonar, Marjory (ed.). Andrew A Bonar: Diary and Life. Edinburgh: Banner of Truth Trust. ISBN 0-85151-432-4.

while the Reminiscences are available separately as:

- Bonar, Marjory (1999). Andrew A Bonar: The Good Pastor. Belfast: Ambassador Productions. ISBN 1-84030-045-0.
