= Robert Murray M'Cheyne =

Minister in the Church of Scotland (1813–1843)

The Reverend Robert Murray McCheyne
- Self-portrait of McCheyne
- Elected: elected in August 1836
- Other posts: assistant at Larbert and Dunipace; licen. by Presbytery of Annan 1 July 1835

Orders
- Ordination: 24 November 1836

Personal details
- Born: 21 May 1813 Edinburgh, Scotland
- Died: 25 March 1843 (aged 29) Dundee, Scotland
- Education: High School of Edinburgh
- Alma mater: University of Edinburgh
- Signature: Robert Murray McCheyne's signature

Robert Murray McCheyne or M'Cheyne (/məkˈʃeɪn/; 21 May 1813 – 25 March 1843) was a minister in the Church of Scotland from 1835 to 1843. He was born at Edinburgh on 21 May 1813, was educated at the university and at the Divinity Hall of his native city, and was assistant at Larbert and Dunipace. A mission of inquiry among the Jews throughout Europe and in Palestine and a religious revival at his church in Dundee made him feel that he was being called to evangelistic rather than to pastoral work, but before he could carry out his plans he died, on 25 March 1843. McCheyne, though wielding remarkable influence in his lifetime, was still more powerful afterwards, through his Memoirs and Remains, edited by Andrew Bonar, which ran into far over a hundred English editions. Some of his hymns became well known and his Bible reading plan is still in common use.

== Early life and ministry ==
Robert Murray McCheyne was born at 14 Dublin Street in Edinburgh on 21 May 1813, the son of Adam McCheyne W.S. (d. 1854), and Lockhart Murray, daughter of David Dickson of Locherwoods, Dumfriesshire. At the age of four he knew the characters of the Greek alphabet, and was able to sing and recite fluently. He entered the high school in his eighth year, and matriculated in November 1827 at University of Edinburgh, where he showed very versatile powers, and distinguished himself especially in poetical exercises, being awarded a special prize by Professor Wilson for a poem on ‘The Covenanters.’ In the winter of 1831 he commenced his studies in the Divinity Hall, under Thomas Chalmers and David Welsh; and he was licensed as a preacher by the Annan presbytery on 1 July 1835.

He first served as an assistant to John Bonar in the parish of Larbert and Dunipace, near Falkirk, from 1835 to 1836. On 24 November 1836 he was ordained to the pastorate of St. Peter's Church, Dundee, which had been erected into a quoad sacra parish in the preceding May. The congregation numbered eleven hundred hearers, and McCheyne addressed himself to the work of the ministry with so much ardour that his health again gave way, and in December 1838 he was compelled to desist from all public duty. He went to Edinburgh to rest and recuperate. During his absence his pulpit was supplied by William Chalmers Burns, afterwards the celebrated missionary to China.

== Mission ==
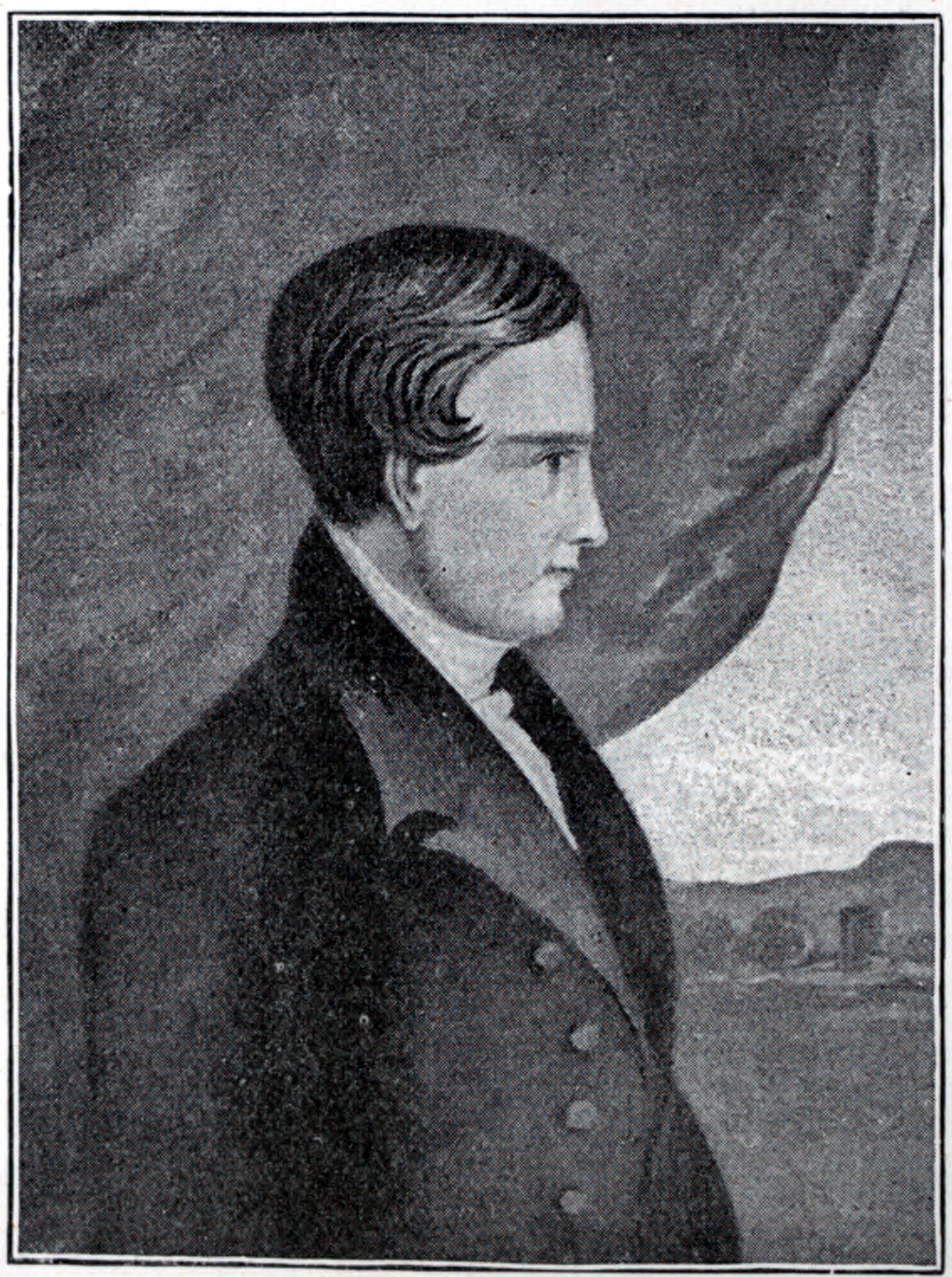
Robert Murray McCheyne from "The Sea of Galilee Mission of the Free Church of Scotland"

In 1839, McCheyne and Bonar, together with two older ministers, Alexander Black and Alexander Keith, were sent to Palestine on a mission of inquiry to the condition of the Jews. Upon their return, their official report for the Board of Mission of the Church of Scotland was published as Narrative of a Visit to the Holy Land and Mission of Inquiry to the Jews. This led subsequently to the establishment of missions to the Jews by the Church of Scotland and by the Free Church of Scotland. Islay Burns, brother and biographer of William Chalmers Burns succeeded McCheyne as minister of St. Peter's.

== Return to Dundee ==
McCheyne was away from 12 April to 6 November 1839. On his return he resumed his work at Dundee with renewed energy. In the autumn of 1842 he visited the north of England on an evangelical mission, and made similar journeys to London and Aberdeenshire. He preached in the morning and afternoon of 12 March to his own people in Dundee, and in the evening preached at Broughty Ferry. Two days afterwards was seized with typhus fever, which he had contracted in the course of visitation, and died 25 March 1843.

== Burial ==
He died of typhus in Dundee following a short illness on 25 March 1843. His parents agreed to the wish of his congregation that McCheyne be buried in the graveyard beside St Peter's Church in Dundee, rather than in the family's own burial-ground in Edinburgh. He was buried on Thursday 30 March 1843, with an estimated 7000 people attending the funeral. An imposing monument marks his grave.

== Legacy ==
McCheyne was a preacher, a pastor, a poet, and wrote many letters. He was also a man of deep piety and a man of prayer.

McCheyne died exactly two months before the Disruption of 1843. This being so, his name was subsequently held in high honour by all the various branches of Scottish Presbyterianism, though he himself held a strong opinion against the Erastianism which led to the Disruption. Bonar records, "And when, on 7 March of the following year (i.e. 1843), the cause of the Church was finally to be pleaded at the bar of the House of Commons, I find him writing: 'Eventful night this in the British Parliament! Once more King Jesus stands at an earthly tribunal, and they know Him not!'" —Memoir (1892), p. 147).

Although widely believed to have been engaged to be married to Jessie Thain at the time of his death (and once, some ten years earlier, to Margaret Maxwell), largely owing to Smellie's popular biography, recent scholarship has disproved both of these claims. Perhaps no minister in the Church of Scotland is better remembered for the saintliness of his character, the anxious devotion which influenced the whole of his short ministry, and the success which everywhere accompanied his efforts as a preacher of the Gospel. He was a diligent Bible student and a good classical scholar. He learned to read Greek when he was but a boy, and he could carry on a conversation in Hebrew. He had fine poetical, artistic, and musical gifts. He trained his congregation in psalmody, and his hymns are the property of all the Churches.

Not long after his death, his friend Andrew Alexander Bonar edited his biography which was published with some of his manuscripts as The Memoir and Remains of the Rev. Robert Murray M'Cheyne. The book went into many editions. It has had a lasting influence on Evangelical Christianity worldwide.

McCheyne designed a widely used system for reading through the Bible in one year. The plan entails reading the New Testament and the Psalms through twice a year, and the Old Testament through once. This program was included (in a slightly modified form) in For the Love of God by D. A. Carson and is recommended by several Bible publishers, such as the English Standard Version and the New English Translation.

The former McCheyne Memorial Church in Dundee is named after him.

== Typography ==
The proper typography for his surname is with a left single quotation mark, i.e. M‘Cheyne. The use of an ordinary apostrophe is so common, that no attempt is made here to standardise how it is written. Likewise, for the alternative common use of McCheyne.

== Works ==
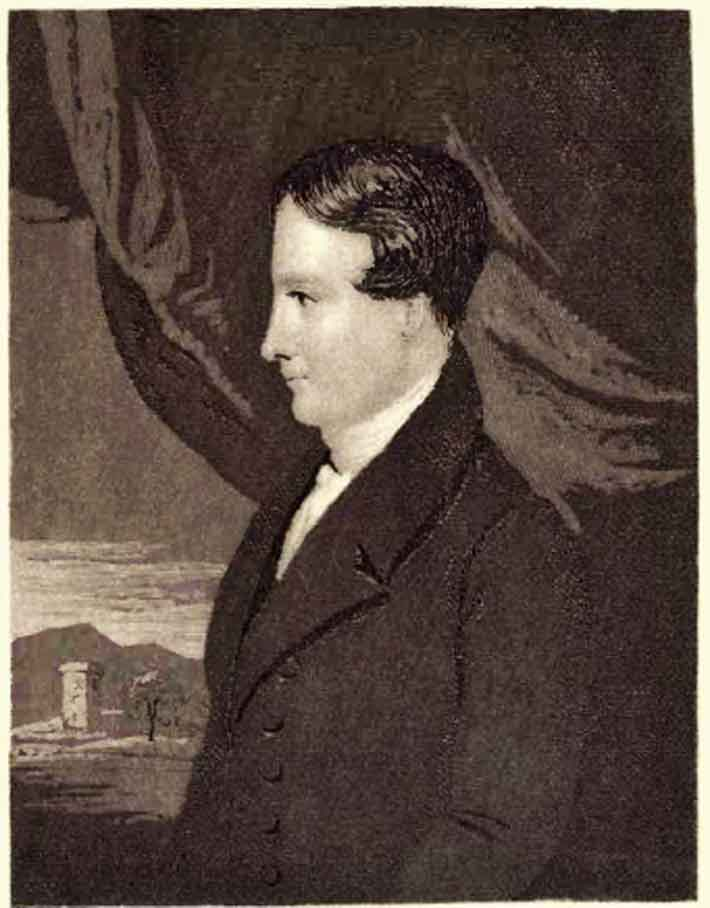
Robert Murray McCheyne

- Why is God a Stranger in the Land? (Edinburgh, 1838)
- Reasons why Children should fly to Christ without Delay (Edinburgh, 1839)
- To the Lambs of the Flock (Edinburgh, 1840)
- Testimony against the running of Railway Trains on Sabbath (Dundee, 1841)
- Love the Lord's Day (Dundee, 1841)
- Daily Bread (Edinburgh, 1842)
- Another Lily Gathered (Edinburgh, 1842)
- Narrative of a Mission of Inquiry to the Jews from the Church of Scotland in 1839 [jointly with Andrew A. Bonar](Edinburgh, 1842)
- The Eternal Inheritance, the Believer's Portion, and The Vessels of Wrath fitted to Destruction, two discourses (Dundee, 1843)
- Expositions of the Epistles to the Seven Churches of Asia (Dundee, 1843)
- Songs of Zion to cheer and guide Pilgrims on their way to the New Jerusalem (Dundee, 1843)
- Memoir and Remains (portrait) by Andrew A. Bonar (Edinburgh, 1844; numerous editions, and Gaelic translation by Allan Sinclair, 1895)
- Additional Remains consisting of various Sermons and Lectures (Edinburgh, 1846)
- Basket of Fragments, the Substance of Sermons (Aberdeen, 1848)
- Revival Truth, being Sermons hitherto unpublished (London, 1860)
- Mission of Discovery Christian Focus Publications, ISBN 978-1-85792-258-5

He wrote these hymns —

- When this Passing World is done
- I once was a Stranger to Grace and to God
- Beneath Moriah's Rocky Side [written at the foot of Carmel, June 1839]
- Like Mist on the Mountains
- Ten Virgins clothed in White
