= Frederick Nolan (theologian) =

Irish Anglican theologian

Frederick Nolan (1784–1864) was an Irish Anglican theologian.

== Life ==
Born at Old Rathmines Castle, County Dublin, the seat of his grandfather, on 9 February 1784, third son of Edward Nolan of St. Peter's, Dublin, by his wife Florinda. In 1796 he entered Trinity College, Dublin, but did not graduate, and on 19 November 1803 matriculated as a gentleman commoner of Exeter College, Oxford, chiefly in order to study at the Bodleian and other libraries. He passed his examination for the degree of B.C.L. in 1805, but he did not take it until 1828, when he proceeded D.C.L. at the same time. He was ordained in August 1806, and after serving curacies at Woodford, Hackney, and St Benet Fink, London, he was presented, on 25 October 1822, to the vicarage of Prittlewell, Essex. In 1814 he was appointed to preach the Boyle lecture, in 1833 the Bampton lecture at Oxford, and during 1833–6 the Warburtonian lecture, being the first clergyman to deliver these three lectures.

Nolan had a considerable reputation as a theologian and linguist. His religious views were evangelical, and he was strongly opposed to the Oxford Movement. He became a Fellow of the Royal Society in 1832.

He died at Geraldstown House, County Meath, on 16 September 1864, and was buried in the ancestral vault in Navan churchyard. He was married, but left no issue, and with him the family became extinct.

== Works ==
Some of his works were printed at a press which he set up at Prittlewell. His major works were:

- 'The Romantick Mythology, in two parts. To which is subjoined a Letter illustrating the origin of the marvellous Imagery, particularly as it appears to be derived from Gothick Mythology,' 4to, London, 1809.
- An Inquiry into the nature and extent of Poetick Licence, 8vo, London 1810; published under the pseudonym of 'N. A. Vigors, jun., Esq.'
- The Operations of the Holy Ghost, illustrated and confirmed by Scriptural Authorities, in a series of sermons evincing the wisdom ... of the Economy of Grace, London, 1813.
- An Inquiry into the Integrity of the Greek Vulgate, or Received Text of the New Testament, etc. London, 1815 (a 'Supplement' followed in 1830).
- Fragments of a civick feast: being a Key to Mr. Volney's "Ruins: or, the Revolutions of Empires; by a Reformer,"' 8vo, London, 1819. In this work the revolutionary and sceptical opinions of the Comte de Volney are refuted.
- A Harmonical Grammar of the principal ancient and modern Languages; viz. the Latin, Greek, Hebrew, Chaldee, Syriac, and Samaritan, the French, Italian, Spanish, Portuguese, German, and Modern Greek, 2 parts, London, 1822 (most of these grammars had been published separately in 1819 and 1821).
- The Expectations formed by the Assyrians that a Great Deliverer would appear about the time of our Lord's Advent demonstrated, London [Prittlewell printed], 1826.
- The Time of the Millennium investigated, and its Nature determined on Scriptural Grounds, London [Prittlewell, privately printed], 1831. The last two works form part of Nolan's 'Boyle Lectures.' After their delivery materials accumulated under his researches for a work of considerable extent, to be entitled A Demonstration of Revelation, from the Sign of the Sabbath, but he did not complete it.
- The Analogy of Revelation and Science established (Bampton Lectures), Oxford, 1833.
- The Chronological Prophecies as constituting a Connected System (Warburton Lectures), London, 1837.
- The Evangelical Character of Christianity ... asserted and vindicated, London, 1838.
- The Catholic Character of Christianity as recognised by the Reformed Church, in opposition to the corrupt traditions of the Church of Rome, asserted, London, 1839; this was the first work published in reply to Tracts for the Times.
- The Egyptian Chronology analysed, its theory developed and practically applied, and confirmed in its dates and details, from its agreement with the Hieroglyphic Monuments and the Scripture Chronology, London, Oxford [printed], 1848.
