= John Duncan (theologian) =

Scottish theologian (1796–1870)

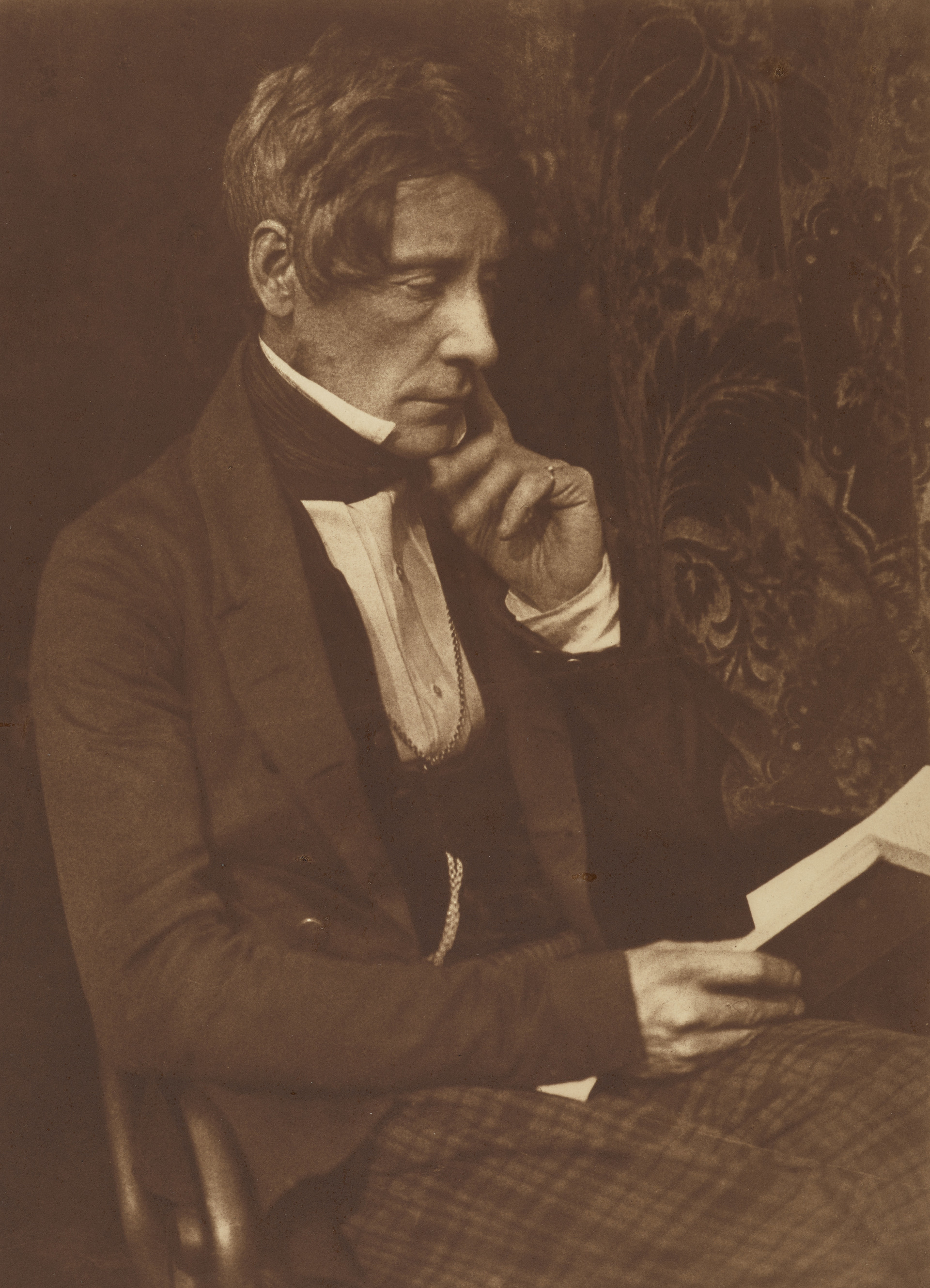
- John Duncan by Hill & Adamson

Personal details
- Born: 1796
- Died: 26 February 1870 (aged 73–74)

John Duncan (1796 – 26 February 1870), also known as "Rabbi" Duncan, was a minister of the Free Church of Scotland, a missionary to the Jews in Hungary, and Professor of Hebrew and Oriental Languages at New College, Edinburgh. He is best remembered for his aphorisms.

== Life ==
Duncan was born in Gilcomston, Aberdeen, the son of a shoemaker. He studied at Marischal College in the University of Aberdeen and obtained an MA in 1814. Duncan embarked upon theological study while still an atheist, first through the Anti-Burgher Secession Church and then the Established Church. He completed his studies in 1821 and subsequently became a theist, but according to his later testimony was not yet converted when he was licensed to preach in 1825. Duncan was converted in 1826 through the ministry of César Malan, and in 1830 commenced ministry at Persie in Perthshire. The following year he moved to Glasgow, and was finally ordained as the minister of Milton parish church on 28 April 1836.

On the occurrence of a vacancy in the chair of oriental languages in the University of Glasgow, he offered himself as a candidate, stating in his application that he knew Hebrew, Syriac, Arabic, Persian, Sanscrit, Bengali, Hindostani, and Mahratti; while in Hebrew literature he professed everything, including grammarians, commentators, law books, controversial books, and books of ecclesiastical scholastics, and of belles-lettres. His application failed, but his college gave him the degree of LL.D. in 1840.

New College, Edinburgh, where Duncan was Professor of Hebrew and Oriental Languages for 27 years

On 7 October 1840, as a consequence of an increased interest in the Church of Scotland concerning the conversion of the Jews, and of his own deep interest in Israel, Duncan was appointed the first Missionary to the Jews from the Church of Scotland. He set out for Pest (part of Budapest) in Hungary in 1841. Macleod writes that "since the days of the Apostles there is hardly on record such a striking work of grace among the Jews as took place in the days of his labours in Buda-Pesth," and that Adolph Saphir and Alfred Edersheim were converted through Duncan's work there. Duchess Maria Dorothea of Württemberg was most friendly, and helped the mission in many ways.

Duncan stayed in Hungary for two years, until the Disruption of 1843 led to an invitation to fill the chair of Hebrew and Oriental Languages at New College, Edinburgh. Duncan occupied this position until his death in 1870.

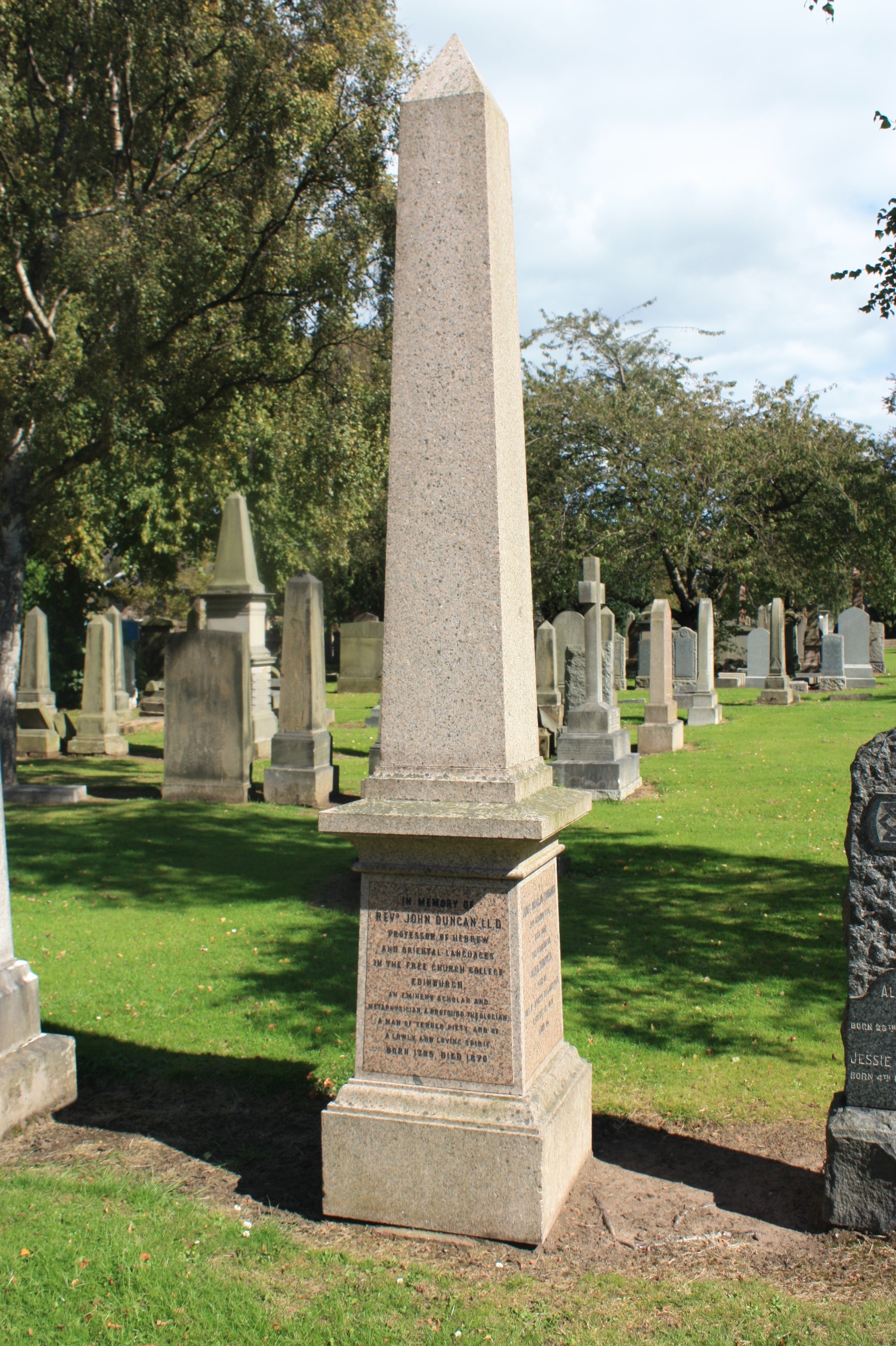
Rev John Duncan's grave, Grange Cemetery

He is buried under a large obelisk in the north-east section of the Grange Cemetery in Edinburgh. His tombstone refers to him as "an eminent scholar and metaphysician, a profound theologian, a man of tender piety and of a lowly loving spirit."

== Legacy ==
Duncan's knowledge of Hebrew and passion for the Jewish people earned him the affectionate epithet "Rabbi". Sinclair describes him as "remarkably absent-minded, in regard to the common things of life," but "intensely exercised about the higher and eternal realities." He did not write any books, although he edited a British edition of Edward Robinson's Lexicon of the Greek New Testament in 1838 and published a few lectures. Rather, Duncan described himself as "just a talker," and had a "genius for epigrammatic wisdom." His aphorisms continue to be quoted. Referring to the linguistic powers of Alexander Black and his colleague, John Duncan, Thomas Guthrie used to say that ‘they could speak their way to the wall of China;’ yet no corresponding products of their learning were given to the public.

William Knight remarked on Duncan's death that "with him has perished a breathing library of wisdom." William Garden Blaikie suggested that "his profound originality, his intellectual honesty, his deep piety, and childlike simplicity, humility, and affectionateness, commanded the respect of every student."

== Aphorisms ==
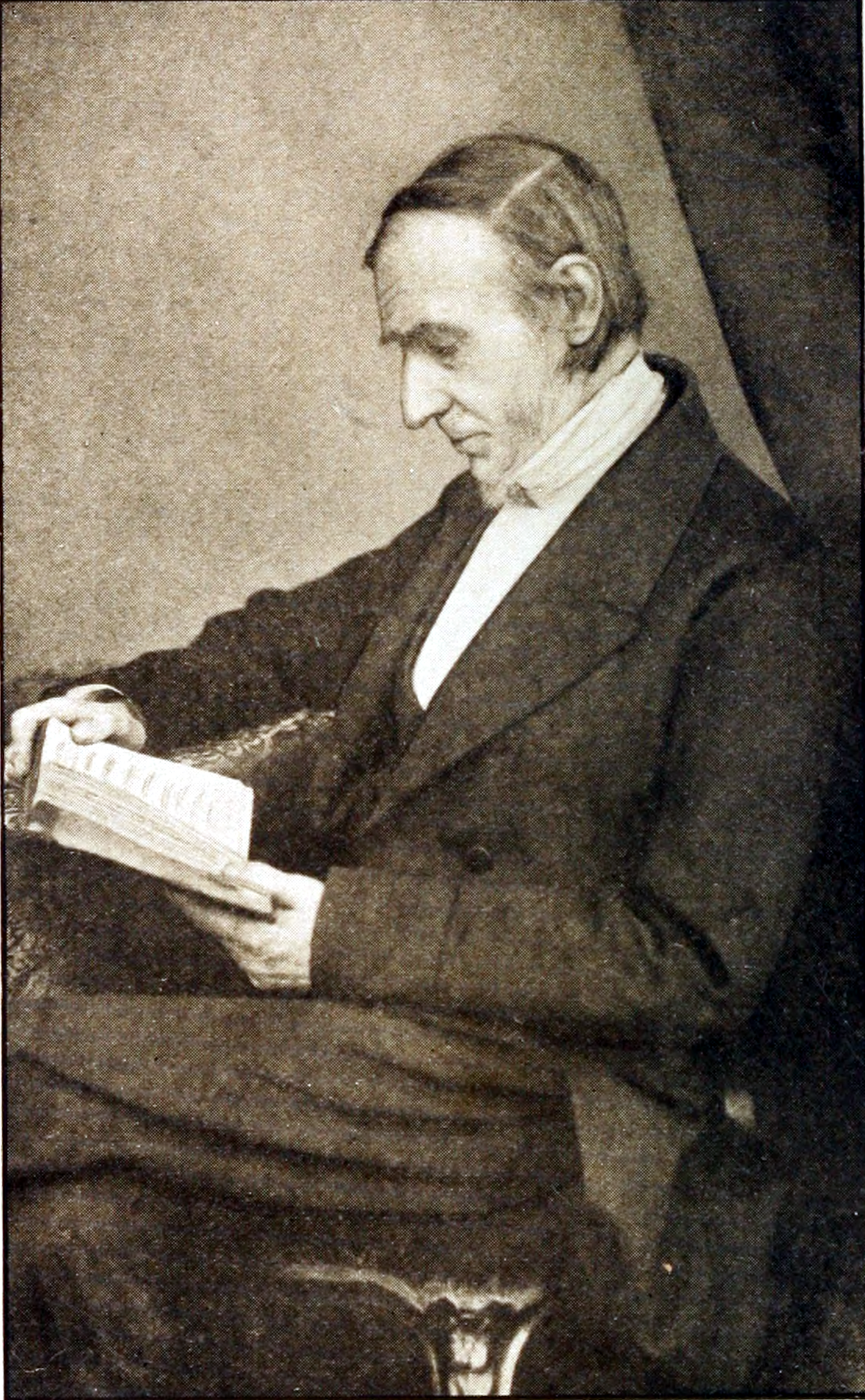
John Duncan from Colloquia peripatetica (6th edn.)

John Duncan was only a moderately successful theological educator. His undisciplined yet highly fertile mind did not give of its best in the classroom. Some considered that the Church would have been better served if he had been permitted to abandon formal lectures in order to conduct walks twice a week with his students in Edinburgh's Princes Street Gardens. Referring to Duncan's peripatetic conversations, one of his students, A. Taylor Innes, said, “It seemed as if Pascal had shuffled into the sandals of Socrates, and walked up and down Edinburgh streets.” (A. Taylor Innes, Studies in Scottish History London: Hodder & Stoughton, 1892, p. 183). The primary source for many of Duncan's striking aphorisms is the volume compiled by another of his students, William Knight, Colloquia Peripatetica: Deep Sea Soundings (Edinburgh: David Douglas, 1889). An edited version, with additions, was compiled in 1997, by John Brentnall: John M. Brentnall, Just a Talker: Sayings of John `Rabbi' Duncan (Edinburgh: Banner of Truth Trust, 1997). The two cited below, both found in Colloquia Peripatetica, are good examples of his style.

"I am first a Christian, next a catholic, then a Calvinist, fourth a paedobaptist, and fifth a Presbyterian. I cannot reverse this order."

"Hyper-Calvinism is all house and no door: Arminianism is all door and no house."

== Family ==
He married:

- (1) 18 January 1837, Janet (died two years later as a consequence of the premature birth of her second child - 24 January 1839), daughter of Dr J. Towers of the island of St Croix and had issue:
  - Annie, born 1838 (married 1861, John Leckie, West Indies)
- (2) Janet (died 28 October 1852), daughter of James Douglas, minister of Stewarton, and widow of John Torrance, surgeon, Kilmarnock. and had issue:
  - Maria, born 1842 (married 1865, Adolph Spaeth, Lutheran minister, Philadelphia, U.S.A.
