= Alfred Edersheim =

Austro-Hungarian born British biblical scholar (1825-1889)

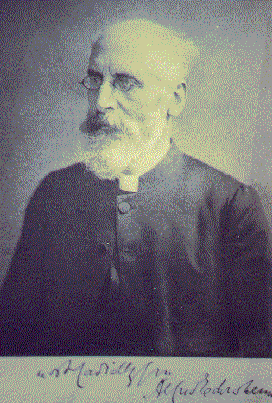
Alfred Edersheim.

Alfred Edersheim (7 March 1825 – 16 March 1889) was an Austrian Jewish convert to Christianity and a Biblical scholar known especially for his book The Life and Times of Jesus the Messiah (1883).

== Early life and education ==
Edersheim was born in Vienna to Jewish parents of culture and wealth. English was spoken in their home, and he became fluent at an early age. He was educated at a local gymnasium and also in the Talmud and Torah at a Hebrew school, and in 1841 he entered the University of Vienna. His father suffered illness and financial reversals before Alfred could complete his university education, and he had to support himself.

== Conversion and Christian ministry ==
Edersheim emigrated to Hungary and became a teacher of languages. He converted to Christianity in Pest when he came under the influence of John Duncan, a Free Church of Scotland chaplain to workmen engaged in constructing a bridge over the Danube. Edersheim accompanied Duncan on his return to Scotland and studied theology at New College, Edinburgh, and at the University of Berlin. In 1846 Alfred was married to Mary Broomfield. They had seven children. In the same year, he was ordained to the ministry in the Free Church of Scotland. He was a missionary to the Jews at Iaşi, Romania, for a year.

On his return to Scotland, after preaching for a few months in a Free Church of Scotland congregation at Woodside, Aberdeen, Edersheim was appointed in 1849 to minister in that denomination in Old Aberdeen. In 1861 health problems forced him to resign and the Church of St. Andrew was built for him at Torquay. In 1867/8 he cared for the Rev Prof Robert Lee in his home, for the final months of Lee's life.

In 1872, Edersheim's health again obliged him to retire, and for four years he lived quietly at Bournemouth. In 1875, he was ordained in the Church of England, and was Curate of the Abbey Church, Christchurch, Hants, for a year, and from 1876 to 1882 Vicar of Loders, Bridport, Dorset. He was appointed to the post of Warburtonian Lecturer at Lincoln's Inn 1880-84. In 1882 he resigned and relocated to Oxford. He was Select Preacher to the University 1884-85 and Grinfield Lecturer on the Septuagint 1886-88 and 1888-89.

Edersheim was an advocate of gap creationism.

He died in Menton, France, on 16 March 1889.

== Works ==
- History of the Jewish Nation after the Destruction of Jerusalem by Titus (Edinburgh, 1856)
- The Jubilee Rhythm of St. Bernard, and other Hymns (1866)
- The Golden Diary of Heart-Converse with Jesus in the Psalms (1874)
- The Temple and Its Ministry and Services at the Time of Jesus Christ (London, 1874)
- Bible History (7 vols., 1876–87)
- The World Before the Flood and the History of the Patriarchs (1875)
- Sketches of Jewish Social Life in the Days of Christ (1876)
- The Life and Times of Jesus the Messiah (2 vols.,1883; condensation in one volume, 1890)
- Prophecy and History in Relation to the Messiah (Warburton Lectures for 1880-1884, 1885)
- Tohu va Bohu, "Without form and Void." A Collection of fragmentary Thoughts and Criticisms. Ed. with a Memoir, by Ella Edersheim (1890)
- Jesus the Messiah (London, 1898)
- Historical Development of Speculative Philosophy, from Kant to Hegel - translation (1854) of a philosophical book by Heinrich Moritz Chalybäus (1796-1862)

== Sources ==
This article borrows heavily from the New Schaff-Herzog Encyclopedia of Religious Knowledge, put forth in the public domain by CCEL.org

- David Mishkin, The Wisdom of Alfred Edersheim, Wipf and Stock Publishers, 2008, ISBN 978-1-55635-939-2
- Richardson, Marianna (2008). Alfred Edersheim: A Jewish Scholar for the Mormon Prophets. CedarFort. ISBN 1599551128
