= A land without a people for a people without a land =

Phrase associated with Zionism

"A land without a people for a people without a land" is a widely cited phrase associated with Zionism, the movement to establish a Jewish homeland in Palestine.

The phrase was first used by Christian Zionists in the early 19th century, and Anita Shapira writes that it "was common among Zionists at the end of the nineteenth, and the beginning of the twentieth century." Israel Zangwill made prominent use of the phrase.

Its historical significance is a matter of contention, with some historians claiming that the phrase never came into widespread use among Jewish Zionists.

== History ==
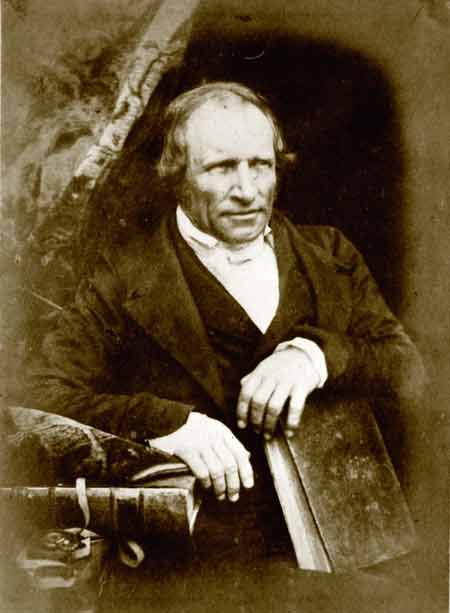
Rev. Dr. Alexander Keith

A sermon of the British Methodist minister Richard Watson, who died in 1833, included:

Though Israel is scattered, yet shall he be gathered. All the Scriptures go to this. And this is supported by two singular facts : One, that the Jews have always been a distinct people ; the other, that their country is unprotected, and waiting for them. There is a people without a country, and a country without a people.

The phrase in the form "It is a country without a people ... They are a people without a country. How wonderful the correspondence!" appeared in a newspaper of the Episcopal Church in Philadelphia in 1936.

Another early use of the phrase was by Christian clergyman and Restorationist Rev. Alexander Keith, D.D. Following an expedition to Ottoman Palestine in 1839, Keith published a retrospective of his journey—The Land of Israel—in 1843. Keith wrote of the Jews:

Therefore, are they wanderers throughout the world, who have nowhere found a place on which the sole of their foot could rest—a people without a country; even as their own land, as subsequently to be shown, is in a great measure a country without a people.

Its most common paraphrase, "A land without a people and a people without a land", appeared soon thereafter in print in an 1844 review of Keith's book in a Scottish Free Church magazine.

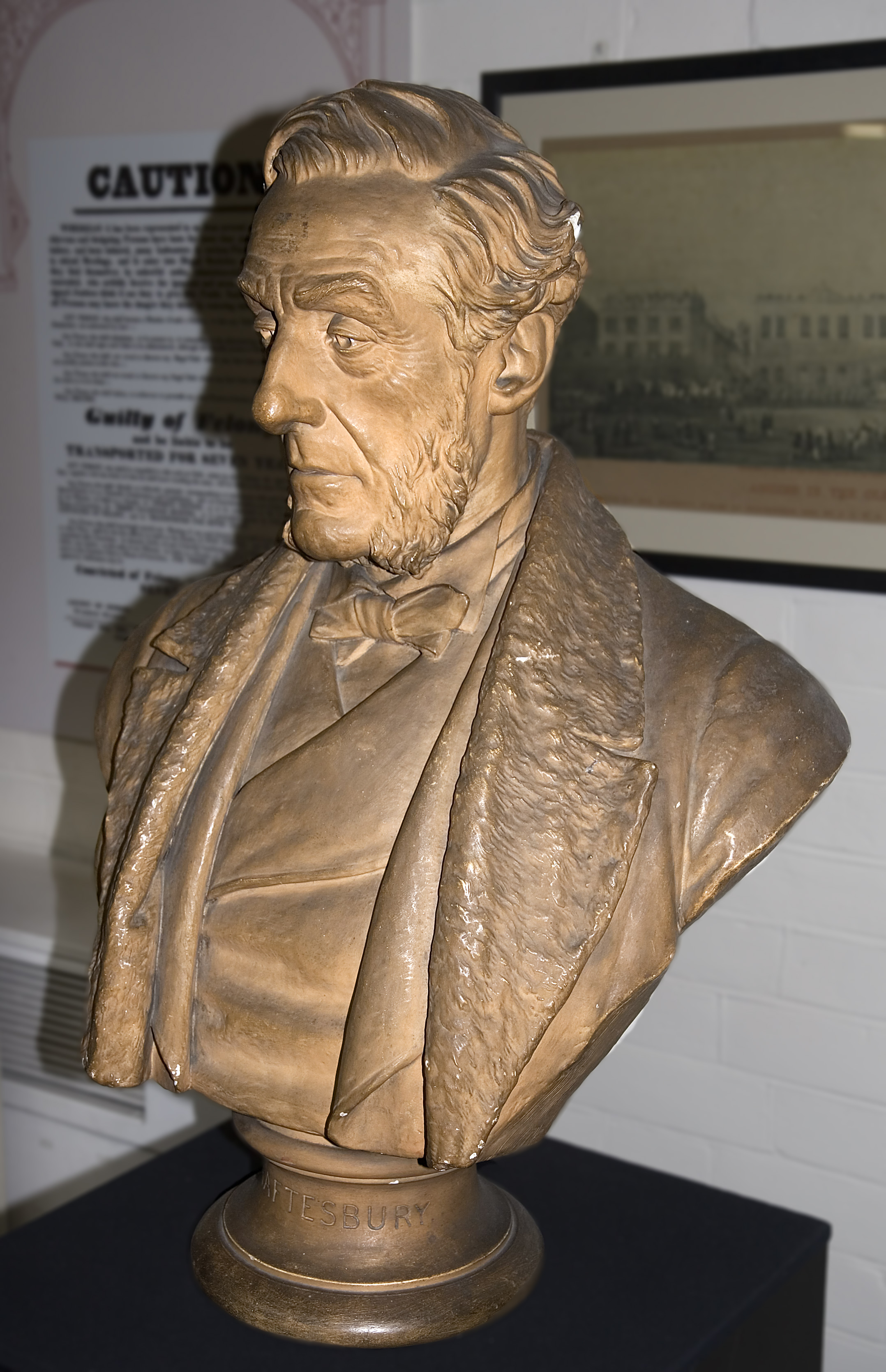
Bust of Anthony Ashley-Cooper, by F. Winter, 1886. In the collection of the Dorset Museum, Dorchester.

Anthony Ashley-Cooper, 7th Earl of Shaftesbury, in July 1853, who was President of the London Society for Promoting Christianity Amongst the Jews wrote to Prime Minister Aberdeen that Greater Syria was "a country without a nation" in need of "a nation without a country... Is there such a thing? To be sure there is, the ancient and rightful lords of the soil, the Jews!" In May of the following year, he wrote in his diary "Syria is 'wasted without an inhabitant'; these vast and fertile regions will soon be without a ruler, without a known and acknowledged power to claim dominion. The territory must be assigned to some one or other... There is a country without a nation; and God now, in His wisdom and mercy, directs us to a nation without a country". In 1875, Shaftesbury told the annual general meeting of the Palestine Exploration Fund that "We have there a land teeming with fertility and rich in history, but almost without an inhabitant – a country without a people, and look! scattered over the world, a people without a country".

Variant phrasings in use in the pre-Zionist and pre-state eras include "a country without a people for a people without a country," "a land without a nation for a nation without a land." According to Edward Said, the phrasing was "a land without people for a people without a land."

== Use of the phrase ==
=== Use of the phrase by Christian Zionists and proponents of a Jewish return to the land ===
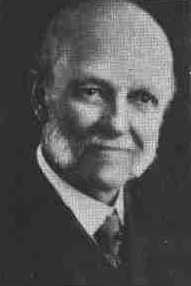
William Eugene Blackstone

The Blackstone Memorial, an 1891 statement of support for making Palestine a Jewish state, was signed by hundreds of prominent Americans and received wide attention. Although the Memorial did not contain the phrase "land without a people", shortly after returning from his trip to Palestine in 1881 Blackstone wrote, in the context of his concern over the fate of the Jews of Russia, "And now, this very day, we stand face to face with the awful dilemma, that these millions cannot remain where they are, and yet have no other place to go... This phase of the question presents an astonishing anomaly – a land without a people, and a people without a land".

John Lawson Stoddard, a popular speaker and author of travel books, published an 1897 travelogue in which he exhorts the Jews, "You are a people without a country; there is a country without a people. Be united. Fulfil the dreams of your old poets and patriarchs. Go back, go back to the land of Abraham".

According to Adam Garfinkle what Keith, Shaftesbury, Blackstone, Stoddard and the other nineteenth century Christians who used this phrase were saying was that the Holy Land was not the seat of a nation in the way that Japan is the land of the Japanese and Denmark is the land of the Danes. The Arabic-speaking Muslim and Christian inhabitants of the "Holy Land" did not, in the view of European and American Christians of that era, appear to constitute a people or nation defined by their attachment to Palestine, they appeared, rather, to be part of the larger Arab, Armenian or Greek peoples.

=== Use of the phrase by Israel Zangwill ===
Israel Zangwill, who was initially a mainstream Zionist but later rejected Palestine as a destination, was one of the most prolific users of the phrase. In 1901 in the New Liberal Review, Zangwill wrote that "Palestine is a country without a people; the Jews are a people without a country". In a debate at the Article Club in November of that year, Zangwill said "Palestine has but a small population of Arabs and fellahin and wandering, lawless, blackmailing Bedouin tribes." "Restore the country without a people to the people without a country. (Hear, hear.) For we have something to give as well as to get. We can sweep away the blackmailer—be he Pasha or Bedouin—we can make the wilderness blossom as the rose, and build up in the heart of the world a civilisation that may be a mediator and interpreter between the East and the West." In 1902, Zangwill wrote that Palestine "remains at this moment an almost uninhabited, forsaken and ruined Turkish territory".

However, within a few years, Zangwill's views changed and his use of the phrase took on a much different tone. Having "become fully aware of the Arab peril," he told an audience in New York, "Palestine proper has already its inhabitants. The pashalik of Jerusalem is already twice as thickly populated as the United States," leaving Zionists the choice of driving the Arabs out or dealing with a "large alien population." He moved his support to the Uganda scheme, leading to a break with the mainstream Zionist movement by 1905. In 1908, Zangwill told a London court that he had been naive when he made his 1901 speech and had since "realized what is the density of the Arab population", namely twice that of the United States. In 1913 he went even further, attacking those who insisted on repeating that Palestine was "empty and derelict" and who called him a traitor for reporting otherwise.

According to Ze'ev Jabotinsky, Zangwill told him in 1916 that, "If you wish to give a country to a people without a country, it is utter foolishness to allow it to be the country of two peoples. This can only cause trouble. The Jews will suffer and so will their neighbours. One of the two: a different place must be found either for the Jews or for their neighbours".

In 1917 he wrote "'Give the country without a people,' magnanimously pleaded Lord Shaftesbury, 'to the people without a country.' Alas, it was a misleading mistake. The country holds 600,000 Arabs."

In 1921 Zangwill wrote "If Lord Shaftesbury was literally inexact in describing Palestine as a country without a people, he was essentially correct, for there is no Arab people living in intimate fusion with the country, utilizing its resources and stamping it with a characteristic impress: there is at best an Arab encampment, the break-up of which would throw upon the Jews the actual manual labor of regeneration and prevent them from exploiting the fellahin, whose numbers and lower wages are moreover a considerable obstacle to the proposed immigration from Poland and other suffering Jewish centers".

=== Use of the phrase by leading Zionists ===
In 1914 Chaim Weizmann, later president of the World Zionist Congress and the first president of the state of Israel said: "In its initial stage Zionism was conceived by its pioneers as a movement wholly depending on mechanical factors: there is a country which happens to be called Palestine, a country without a people, and, on the other hand, there exists the Jewish people, and it has no country. What else is necessary, then, than to fit the gem into the ring, to unite this people with this country? The owners of the country (Note: The identity of the owners is not specified, however, the content of the speech implies that this refers to the Ottoman Turks.) must, therefore, be persuaded and convinced that this marriage is advantageous, not only for the [Jewish] people and for the country, but also for themselves".

In 1916, Herbert Bentwich, one of the founders of the British Zionist Federation, wrote "...'a place in the sun' must be found for the Jewish people; what place so good and so suitable for the people without a land as the land without a people!" In 1924, Vladimir Jabotinsky, the founder of the Revisionist Zionist movement, told an audience in Berlin that "one must go before the nations of the world with a great demand: Give the land without a people to the people without a land! ... The Arabs cannot claim the right of a national majority, because the land is still unpopulated (unbevölkertes)." In 1927, Nahum Sokolov, who was president of the World Zionist Executive, told a meeting in Paris that the Jewish National Fund seeks to give "une terre sans peuple a un peuple sans terre". In 1930, Menachem Ussishkin opened a new building for the Jewish National Fund (which he headed) with the words "From this building calls will come to Jewry to hasten to redeem the land without people for a people without land." Benjamin Netanyahu, prime minister of Israel for several long periods beginning in 1996, wrote in his book A Durable Peace that the phrase represented "a reasonable assessment of the well-known and well-documented situation in Palestine in their day".

=== Use by the Jewish National Fund ===
The Jewish National Fund (JNF) was founded in 1901 to purchase land in Palestine for Jewish settlement, and remains a major participant in that endeavor. For many years, the slogan was used by the JNF in its fund-raising. For example, in 1908 a plea for donations in the Austrian newspaper Jüdische Zeitung said "We Zionists have created an institution in the Jewish National Fund whose goal is 'the acquisition of the land without a people—for the people without a land.'" Later examples include Jüdisches Volksblatt, 1928, Detroit Jewish News, 1954 and 1955 ("It has restored the land without a people to the people without a land."), and The National Jewish Post and Opinion, 1961.

=== Use by the State of Israel ===
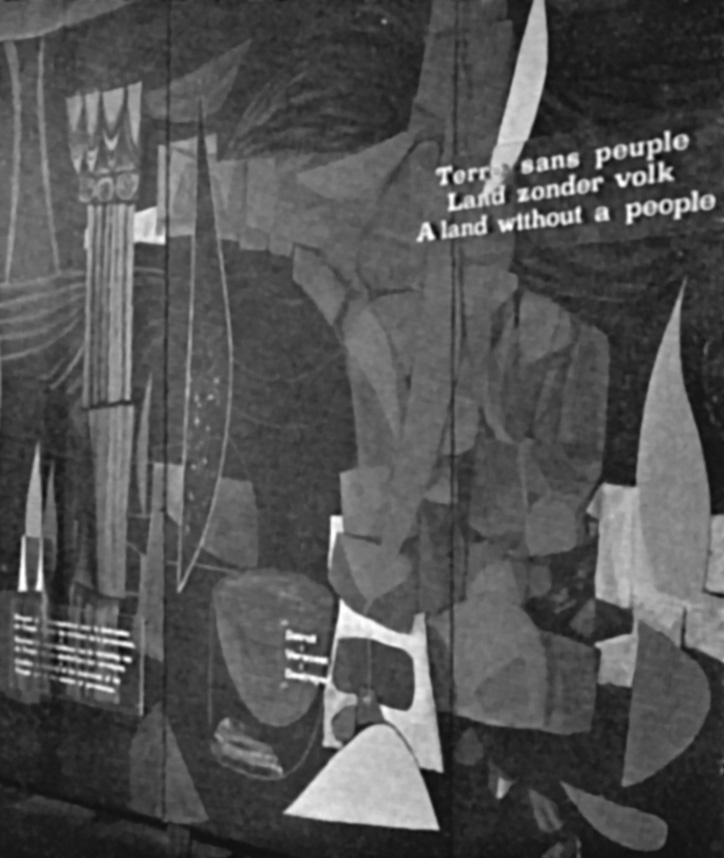
Mural in the Israeli pavilion at Expo 58

On the 10th anniversary of its independence, Israel presented a pavilion at the 1958 Brussels World's Fair. The design of the exhibits was chosen by a committee of prominent Israelis led by David Hacohen and approved by the government. After passing through the entrance way, visitors traversed the "corridor of exile" (Hebrew: פרוזדור הגלות). On the right wall was a mural by Naphtali Bezem with the words "A land without a people" in French, Dutch and English, above an impression of the land as desolate and "destroyed". On the left wall was written "A people without a land", featuring destruction by the Romans, expulsion from Spain, and the Holocaust. No achievements by Jews in the Diaspora were mentioned.

=== Assertions that it was not a Jewish Zionist slogan ===
Adam Garfinkle expressed doubt that the phrase was ever in widespread use among Zionists. After affirming that this was a phrase in use among Christians, he writes "If there were early Zionists who validated that phrase, however, they did not do so easily or for long." Historian Alan Dowty quoted Garfinkle that the phrase was not used by Zionist leaders other than Zangwill.

Diana Muir argued that the phrase was nearly absent from pre-state Zionist literature, writing that, with the exception of Zangwill, "It is not evident that this was ever the slogan of any Zionist organization or that it was employed by any of the movement's leading figures. A mere handful of the outpouring of pre-state Zionist articles and books use it. For a phrase that is so widely ascribed to Zionist leaders, it is remarkably hard to find in the historical record". She proposes that: "Unless or until evidence comes to light of its wide use by Zionist publications and organizations, the assertion that 'a land without a people for a people without a land' was a 'widely propagated Zionist slogan' should be retired".

=== Use of the phrase by opponents of Zionism ===
The phrase has been widely cited by politicians and political activists objecting to Zionist claims, including the Mufti of Jerusalem, Mohammad Amin al-Husayni, who stated that "Palestine is not a land without a people for a people without a land!" On 13 November 1974, PLO leader Yasir Arafat told the United Nations, "It pains our people greatly to witness the propagation of the myth that its homeland was a desert until it was made to bloom by the toil of foreign settlers, that it was a land without a people." In its 14 November 1988 "Declaration of Independence," the Palestinian National Council accused "local and international forces" of "attempts to propagate the lie that 'Palestine is a land without a people.'" Salman Abu Sitta, founder and president of the Palestine Land Society, calls the phrase "a wicked lie in order to make the Palestinian people homeless." Hanan Ashrawi has called this phrase evidence that the Zionists "sought to deny the very existence and humanity of the Palestinians."

According to Diana Muir, the earliest identified use of the phrase by an opponent of Zionism occurred shortly after the British government issued the Balfour Declaration. Muir also cites other pre-statehood uses, including one in 1918 by Ameen Rihani, a Lebanese-American, Christian Arab nationalist, who wrote that "I would even say ... 'Give the land without a people to the people without a land' if Palestine were really without a people and if the Jews were really without a land". Rihani argued that Jews needed no homeland in Palestine because they enjoyed everywhere else "equal rights and equal opportunity, to say the least". And a use by someone Muir describes as an early twentieth-century academic Arabist who wrote that, "Their very slogan, 'The land without a people for the people without a land,' was an insult to Arabs of the country". American journalist William McCrackan said, "We used to read in our papers the slogan of Zionism, 'to give back a people to a Land without a People,' while the truth was that Palestine was already well-peopled with a population which was rapidly increasing from natural causes".

== Interpretation of the phrase by scholars ==
Scholarly opinion on the meaning of the phrase is divided.

=== An expression of the Zionist vision of an empty land ===
A common interpretation of the phrase has been as an expression of the land being empty of inhabitants. Others have argued that in the phrase, "a people" is defined as a nation. Historian Keith Whitelam and Christian activist Mitri Raheb claim that Zionists used this phrase to present Palestine as being "without inhabitants".

Scholar Edward Said, who held it to exemplify a kind of thinking that hopes to "cancel and transcend an actual reality—a group of resident Arabs—by means of a future wish—that the land be empty for development by a more deserving power". In his book The Question of Palestine, Said cites the phrase in this wording, "A land without people for a people without a land". S. Ilan Troen and Jacob Lassner call Said's omission of the indefinite article "a" in "a people" a "distortion" of the meaning and suggest that it was done "perhaps malevolently" for the purpose of making the phrase acquire the meaning that Said and others impute to it, that Zionists thought that the land was or wanted to make it into a land "without people". Historian Adam Garfinkle criticizes Said for writing "without people" instead of "without a people", which he says substantially changes the meaning.

Historian Rashid Khalidi concurs with Said, interpreting the slogan as expressing the Zionist claim that Palestine was empty: "In the early days of the Zionist movement, many of its European supporters—and others—believed that Palestine was empty and sparsely cultivated. This view was widely propagated by some of the movement's leading thinkers and writers, such as Theodor Herzl, Chaim Nachman Bialik, and Max Mandelstamm. It was summed up in the widely propagated Zionist slogan, 'A land without a people for a people without a land'". Muir criticized Khalidi for failing to acknowledge the distinction between "a people" and people. Citing two examples of Khalidi's understanding of "a people" as a phrase referring to an ethnically identified population, she charges Khalidi with "misunderstand(ing) the phrase 'a people' only when discussing the phrase 'land without a people.'"

Norman Finkelstein interprets the phrase as an attempt by Zionists to deny a Palestinian nation. Historian Avi Shlaim states that the slogan employed by Zangwill was used for propaganda purposes, but that from the outset Zionist leaders were aware that "their aim of establishing a Jewish state in a territory inhabited by an Arab community could not be achieved without inducing, by one means or another, a large number of Arabs to leave Palestine."

Anita Shapira wrote that the phrase was common among Zionists of the late 19th and early 20th centuries and "contained a legitimation of the Jewish claim to the land and did away with any sense of uneasiness that a competitor to this claim might appear". Boaz Neumann also wrote that the early Zionist pioneers used the phrase, citing a book of David Ben-Gurion and Yitzhak Ben-Zvi. The writings of Zionist pioneers (Halutzim) were full of expressions of Palestine as an empty and desolate land.

=== An expression of the non-existence of a Palestinian nation ===
Another group of scholars interprets the phrase as an expression of the contentious assertion that, in the nineteenth century and the twentieth century up to WWI, the Arabs living in Palestine did not constitute a self-conscious national group, "a people". Historian Gertrude Himmelfarb wrote that "Shaftesbury, like the later Zionists, clearly meant by 'people' a recognizable people, a nation."

Historian Gudrun Krämer writes that the phrase was a political argument that many mistakenly took to be a demographic argument. "What it meant was not that there were no people in Palestine... Rather, it meant that the people living in Palestine were not a people with a history, culture, and legitimate claim to national self-determination... Palestine contained people, but not a people".

Steven Poole, in a book about the use of language as a weapon in politics, explains the phrase this way, "The specific claim was not the blatantly false one that the territory was unpopulated, nor that those living there were not human, but that they did not constitute 'a people', in other words, it was argued that they had no conception of nationhood in the modern western sense". According to historian Adam M. Garfinkle, the plain meaning of the phrase was that the Jews were a nation without a state while their ancestral homeland, Israel, was at that time (the nineteenth century) not the seat of any nation.

Columbia University professor Gil Eyal writes "In fact, the inverse is true. Zionists never stopped debating Palestinian nationalism, arguing with it and about it, judging it, affirming or negating its existence, pointing to its virtues or vices... The accusation of 'denial' is simplistic and disregards the historical phenomenon of a polemical discourse revolving around the central axis provided by Arab or Palestinian nationalism..."

=== An expression of the intention of ethnic cleansing ===
Historian Nur Masalha regards the phrase as evidence of a Zionist intention of carrying out a program of ethnic cleansing of the Palestinian Arab population – a program euphemistically called "transfer". According to Masalha, Zionist demographic "racism" and Zionist obsession with the Palestinian "demographic threat" have "informed the thinking of Israeli officials since the creation of the state of Israel". Masalha also writes that "Neither Zangwill nor Weizmann intended these demographic assessments in a literal fashion. They did not mean that there were no people in Palestine, but that there were no people worth considering within the framework of the notions of European supremacy that then held sway."

=== An expression of the wish that the Arabs would go away ===
Ghada Karmi and Eugene Cotran interpret the phrase as part of a deliberate ignoring, not expressing a lack of awareness of the existence of Palestinian Arabs on the part of Zionists and, later, Israelis, but, rather, the fact that Zionists and Israelis preferred to pretend that Palestinian Arabs did not exist and the fact that Jews wished they would go away. Nur Masalha, contributing to an edited collection by Ghada Karmi and Eugene Cotran, cites Israel's leading satirist Dan Ben-Amotz, who observed that "the Arabs do not exist in our textbooks [for children]. This is apparently in accordance with the Jewish-Zionist-socialist principles we have received. "A-people-without-a-land-returns-to-a-land-without-people".

=== As an efficiency-based territorial claim ===
Political theorist Tamar Meisels regards the argument made by the slogan as falling into a category of Lockean efficiency-based territorial claims in which nation states including Australia, Argentina, and the United States argue their right to territory on the grounds that the fact that these lands can support many more people under their government than were supported by the methods of the aboriginal peoples confers a right of possession.

== See also ==
Phrases and quotations

- There was no such thing as Palestinians
- The bride is beautiful, but she is married to another man

Related articles

- Demographic history of Palestine (region)
- Media coverage of the Arab-Israeli conflict
