= Nebi Akasha Mosque =

Mosque in Jerusalem

- مسجد عُكَّاشة
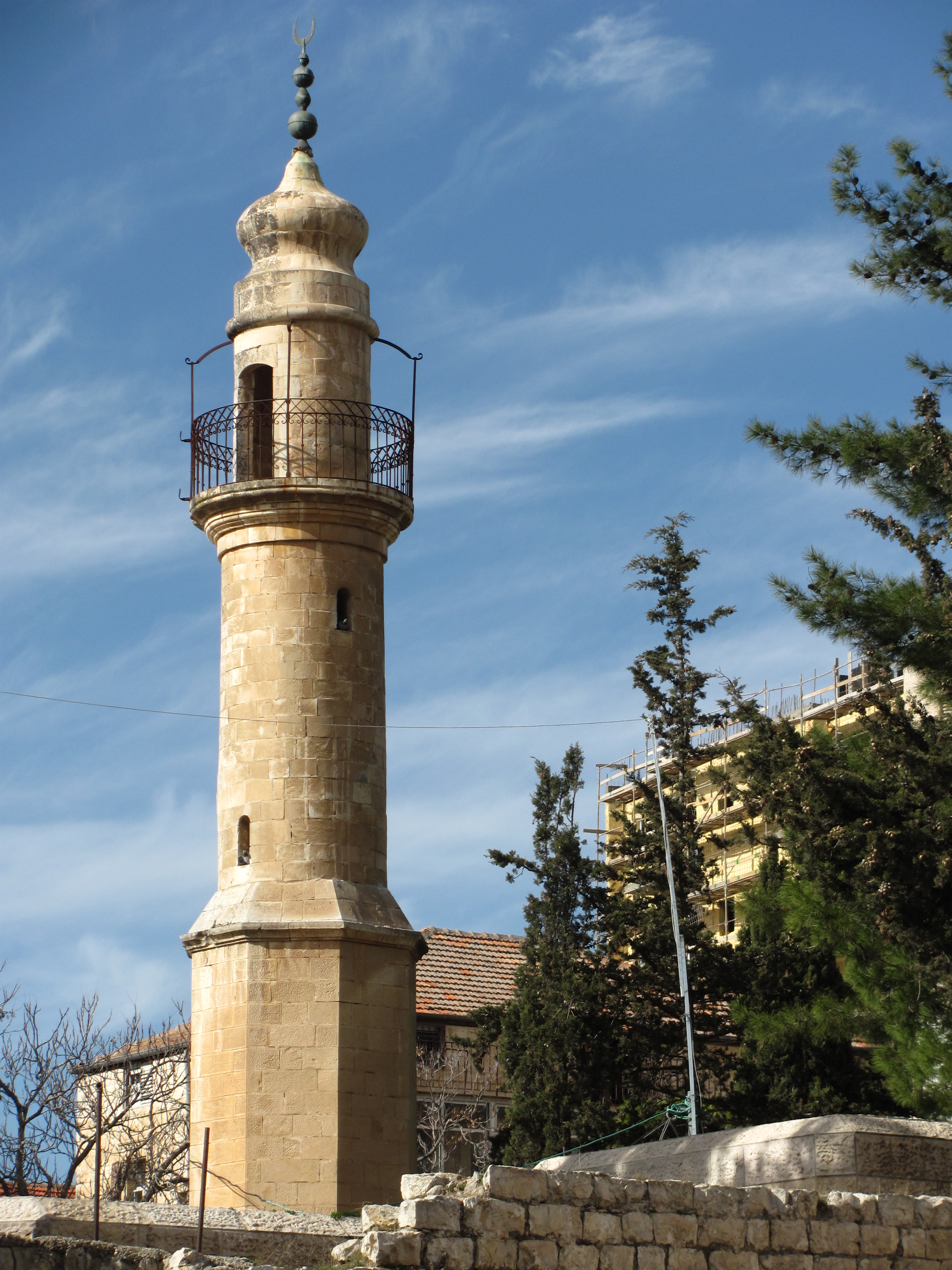
- The mosque minaret in 2012

- Location of the mosque in Jerusalem

Religion
- Affiliation: Islam
- Branch/tradition: Sunni
- Ecclesiastical or organizational status: Mosque; Maqam
- Status: Active

Location
- Location: Straus Street, West Jerusalem
- Country: Israel
- Interactive map of Nebi Akasha Mosque
- Coordinates: 31°47′07.50″N 35°13′05.40″E

Architecture
- Style: Ayyubid
- Completed: 12th century (tomb); 19th century (mosque)

Specifications
- Minaret: One
- Shrine: One: Ukasha ibn al-Mihsan

The Nebi Akasha Mosque (Arabic: مسجد عُكَّاشة), also known as the Okasha mosque or the Ukasha mosque, is a mosque and maqam on Straus Street, north of the Old City, in western Jerusalem, Israel.

== History ==
The tomb of Ukasha ibn al-Mihsan, a companion of the Islamic prophet Muhammad who settled in Jerusalem following the siege of Jerusalem in 637/38, was built in the 12th century CE. According to Islamic tradition, Saladin's soldiers were buried at the site; it became known as the “Tomb of the Martyrs”. Additions were made to the tomb by the Mamluks in the 13th century. There is also a tradition that Moses, Jesus and Muhammad were buried here, leading the British High Commissioner John Chancellor to name the nearby street Street of the Prophets.

Over a 70-year period in the 1800s, the hill on which the tomb stands was used as a meeting place by students of the Vilna Gaon. These Jews rented the hill from its Arab owners and gathered for study and Friday-night prayers in a tent, joined by local Ashkenazi and Sephardi kabbalists. In the late 19th century, an almost entirely Jewish neighborhood called Ukasha in the Ottoman census lists developed around the tomb with the Jewish housing estates of Sha'arey Moshe or the Wittenberg Houses (called the Waytenberk neighborhood in the Ottoman census) founded in 1885, Even Yehoshua founded in 1891, and Kolel Varsha (called the Rabi Daud neighborhood in the Ottoman census) founded in 1897.

A mosque was built beside the tomb in the 19th century.

=== 20th-21st centuries ===
On 26 August 1929, during the 1929 Palestine riots, the mosque was attacked by a group of Jews. The mosque was badly damaged and the tombs were desecrated. As a result of the Palestinian Arab exodus from western Jerusalem during the 1948 Arab–Israeli War, the mosque was abandoned. Today it is located in the middle of a park in a Haredi Jewish neighborhood. It is situated near the junction of Straus Street and the Street of the Prophets.

In December 2011 the mosque was defaced with graffiti by right-wing extremists who tried to set fire to it in a price tag attack. The mosque is inactive and the Jerusalem Municipality uses it as a storage room.

As of 2025, a Hebrew sign on the tomb declares it to be the burial place of the biblical figure Benjamin son of Jacob. This identification is based on the medieval work Sefer haYashar, which claims that Benjamin's bones were buried "in Jerusalem, opposite the Jebusite [city], which was given to the descendants of Benjamin". While this description could apply to a number of sites in the Jerusalem area, the Akasha tomb is perhaps the most notable tomb structure that could meet the description (though it was built many centuries after Benjamin's alleged burial). Other traditions place Benjamin's tomb elsewhere, for example at the Tomb of Benjamin near Kfar Saba.

Another Jewish tradition asserts that the site is the pitcha dekarta ("city entrance") where, according to the Talmud, the messiah is said to sit and from where Jewish prayers go up to heaven. This tradition is attributed to the students of the Vilna Gaon, even though the Vilna Gaon himself wrote that the "city" in question was Rome, not Jerusalem.

== Inscription ==
The tomb includes the following inscription: Arabic: لا اله الا الله ومحمد رسول الله، هذا ضريح سيدنا عكاشة صحابي رسول الله، (translation: There is no God but Allah ِand Muhammad is the Messenger of Allah, this is the shrine of our master Akasha, the companion of the Messenger of Allah).

The tomb includes a date: Arabic: ١٢٨٠, 1280 AH (1863/1864 CE), which was the date of the reconstruction of the tomb.

== Gallery ==
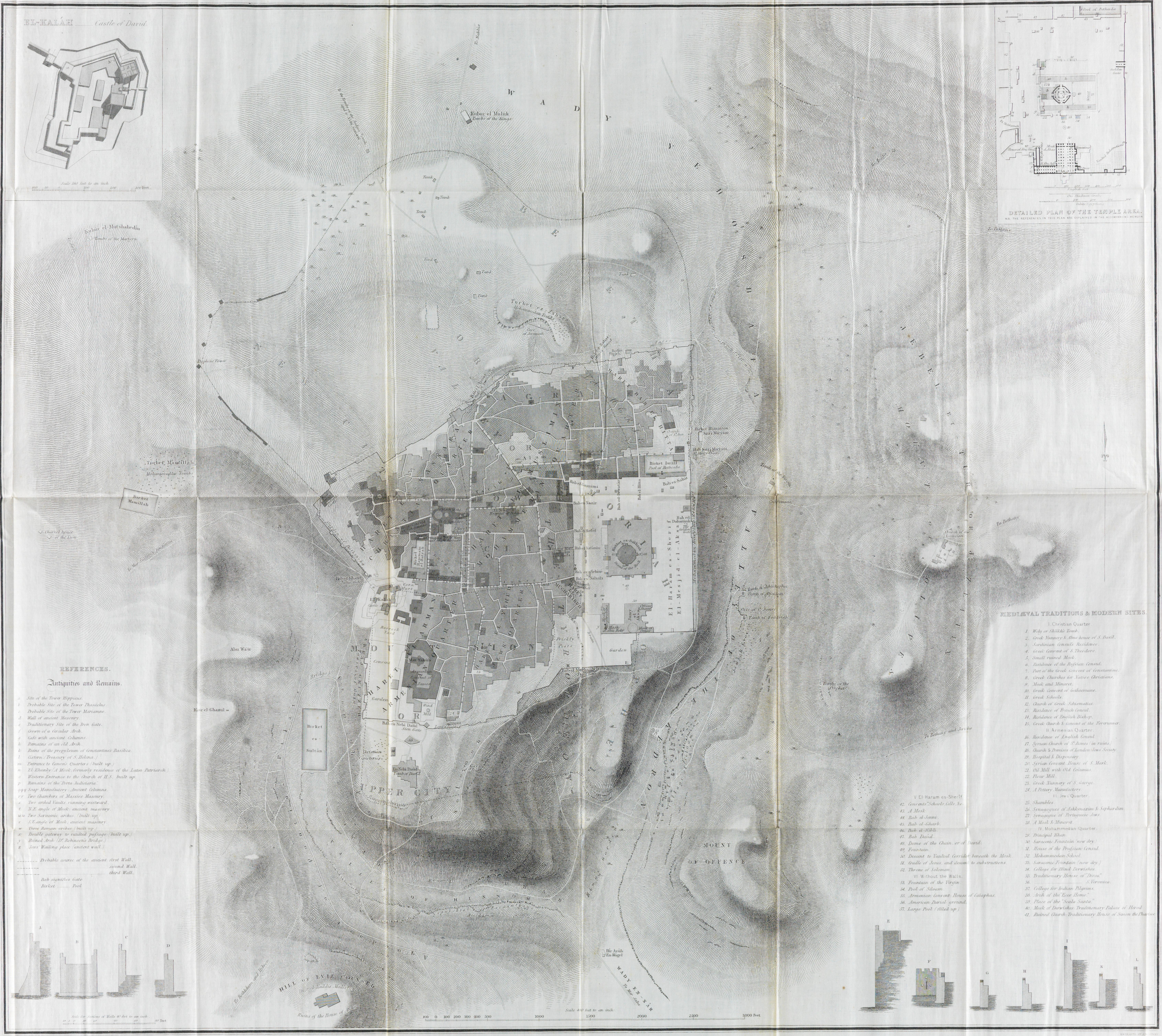
”Tombs of the Martyrs” (top left) shown at the site of the mosque in the 1841 Aldrich and Symonds map of Jerusalem

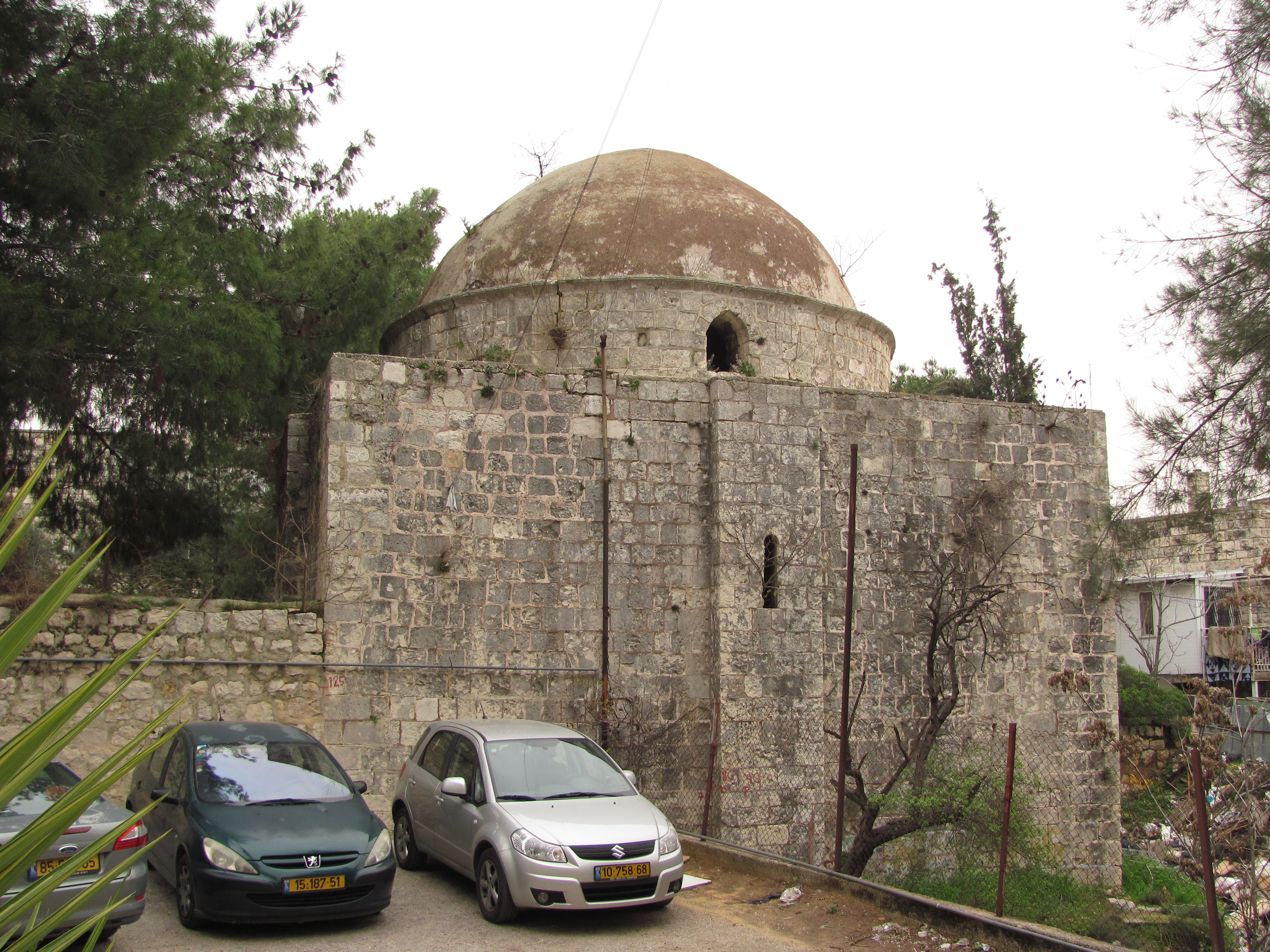
Tomb of Nebi Akasha (Turbat Qameria)

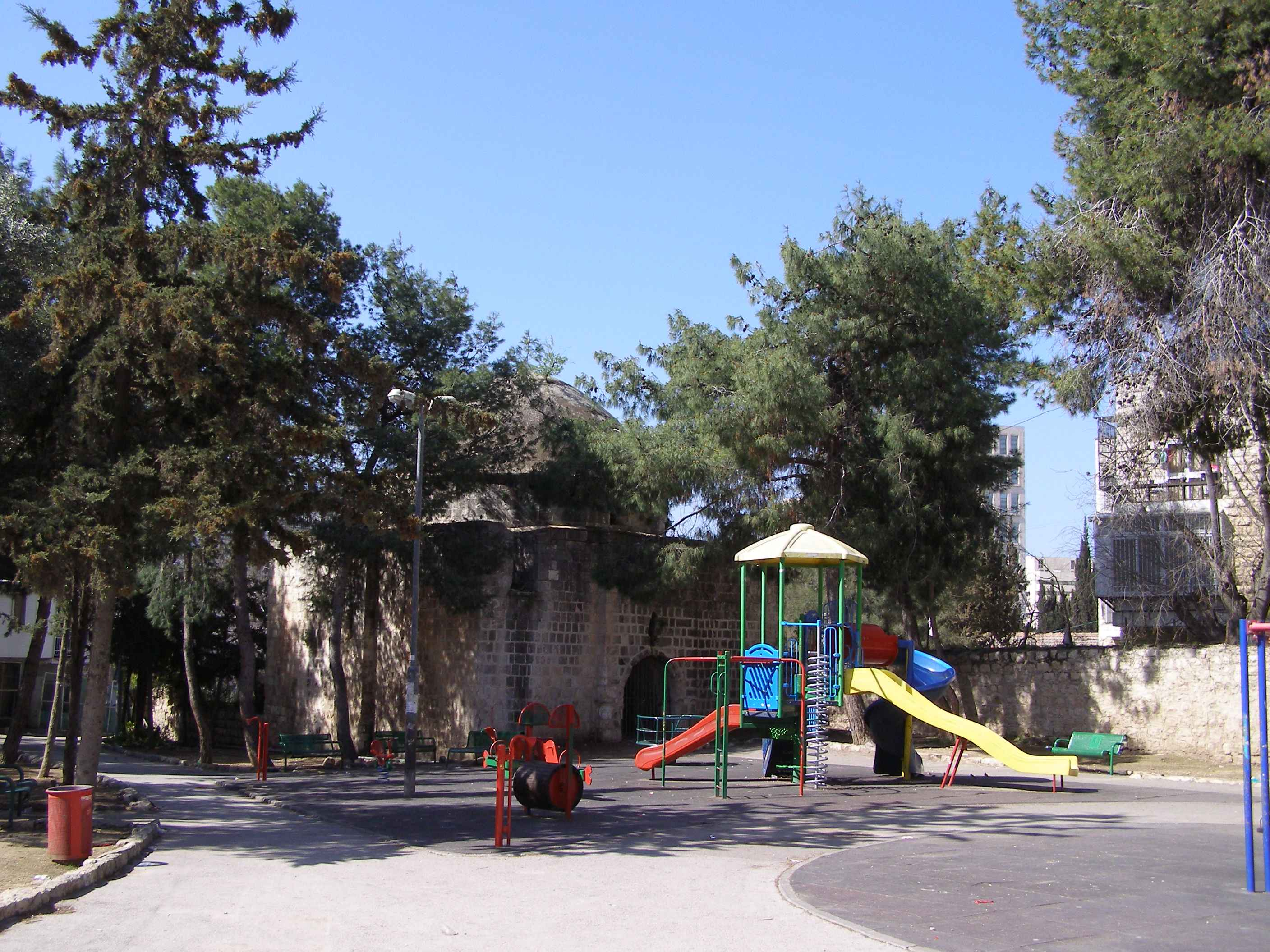
Park between the mosque and tomb

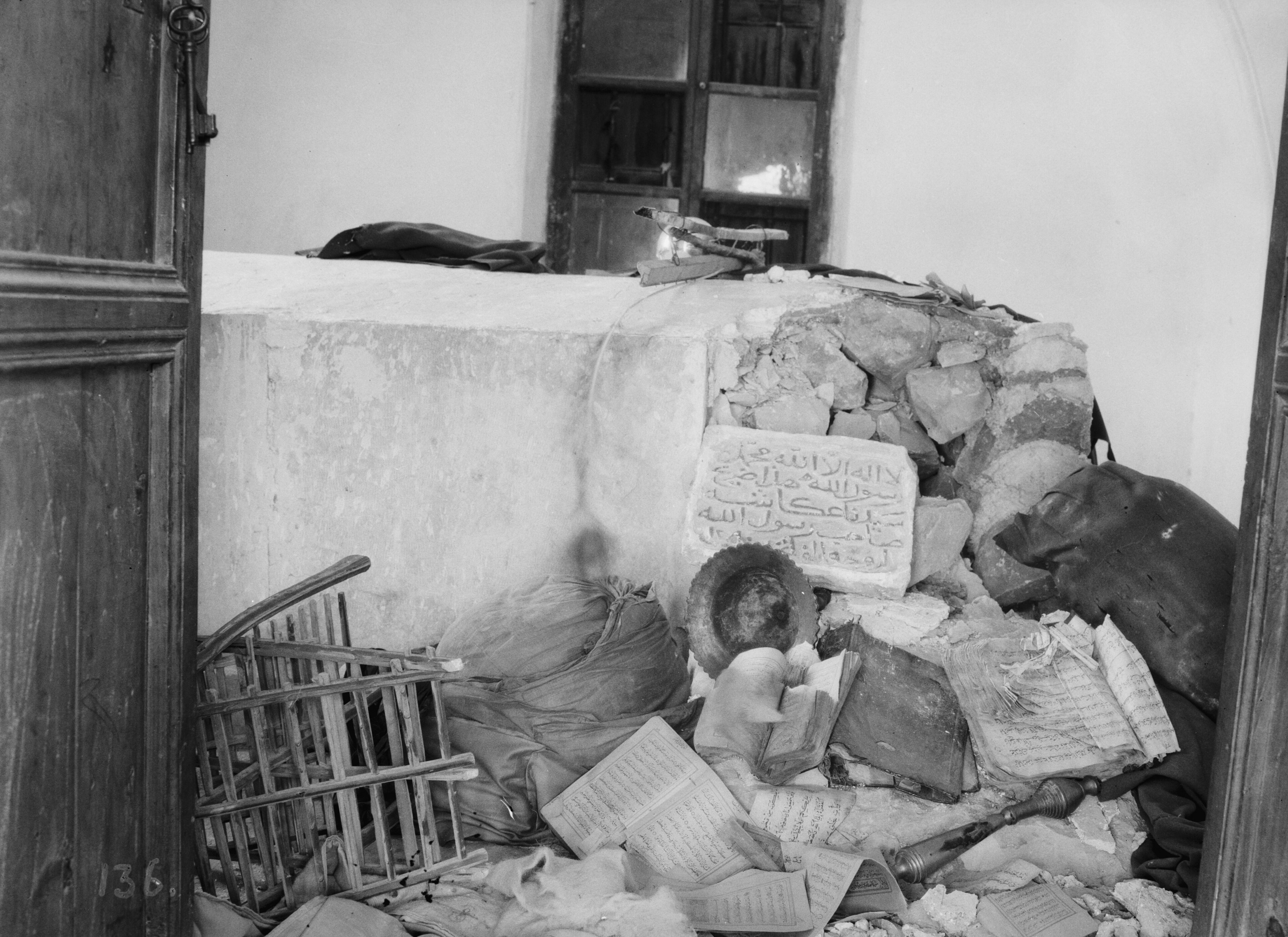
Desecrated graves in the mosque during the 1929 Palestine riots

== See also ==
- List of mosques in Jerusalem
- Islam in Israel
- Expedition of Ukasha bin Al-Mihsan
  - Expedition of Ukasha bin Al-Mihsan (Udhrah and Baliy)
