= Ghamrah =

Ghamrah may refer to:

- Ghamrah, Saudi Arabia
- Ghamra, Egypt, also spelled Ghamrah, a district of Cairo and a station on the Cairo Metro
