= Kafr Saba =

Kafr Saba كفر سابا
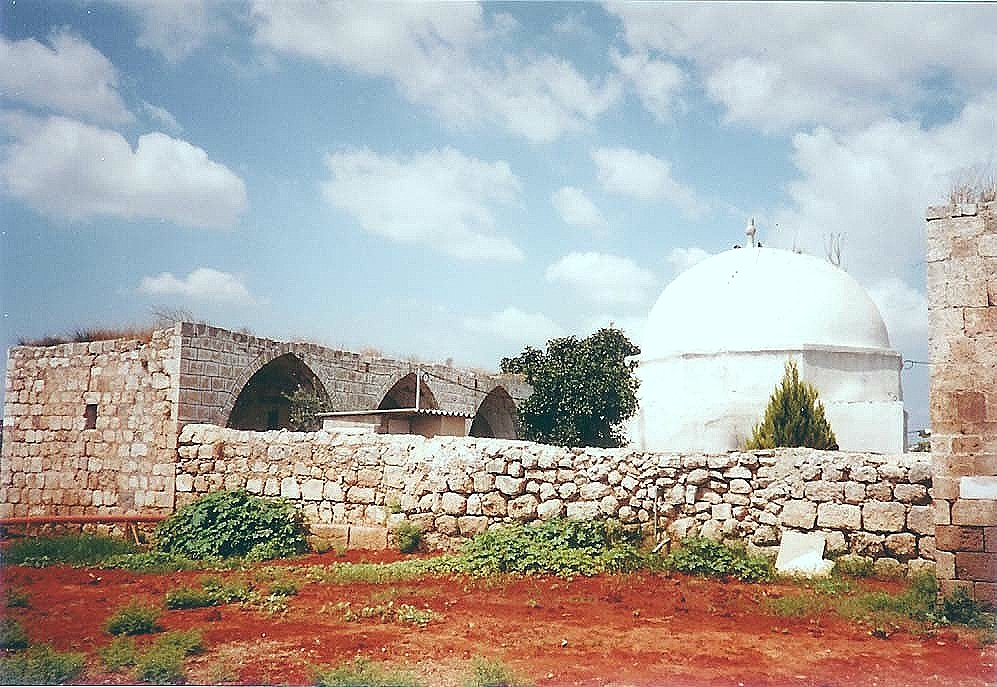
- Mausoleum of Nabi Yamin, with riwaq (prayer hall) to the left.
- Etymology: the village of Sâba (from Aramaic )
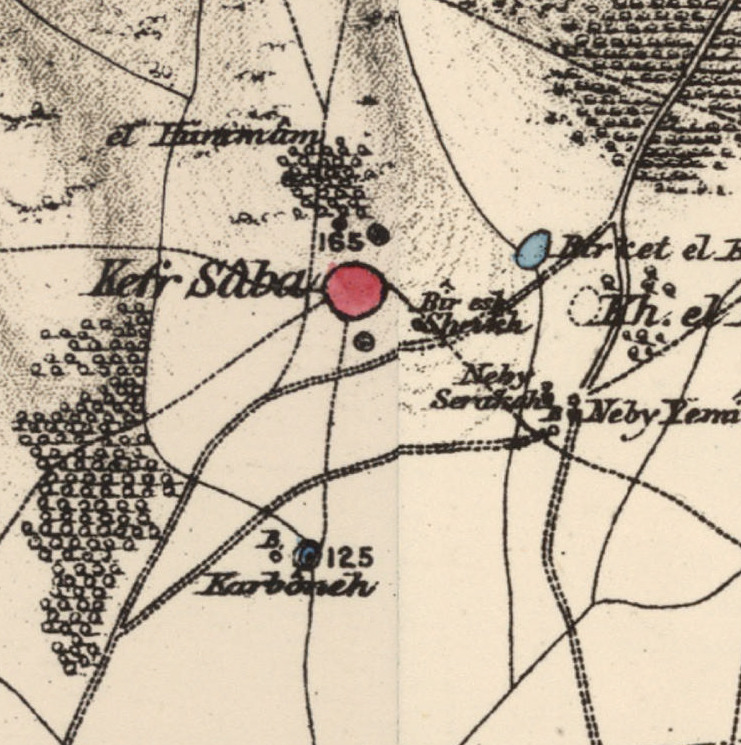
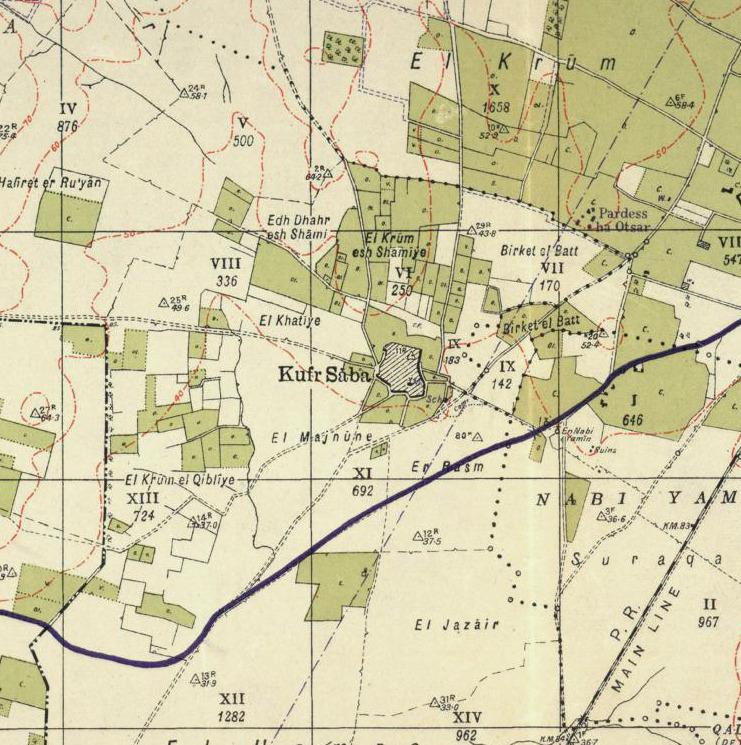
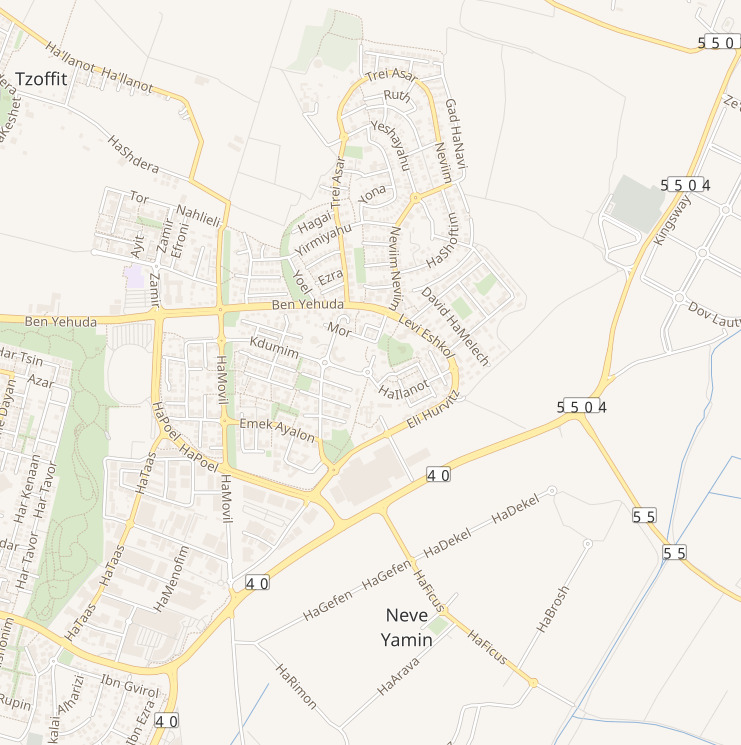
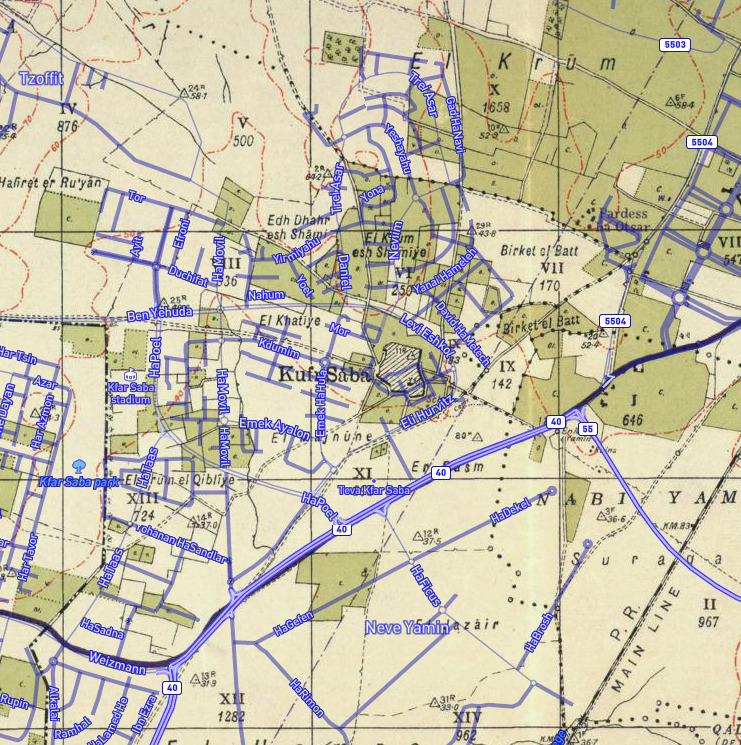
- 1870s map 1940s map modern map 1940s with modern overlay map A series of historical maps of the area around Kafr Saba (click the buttons)

- Location within Mandatory Palestine
- Coordinates: 32°10′52″N 34°56′14″E
- Palestine grid: 144/176
- Geopolitical entity: Mandatory Palestine
- Subdistrict: Tulkarm
- Date of depopulation: 15 May 1948

Area
  - Total: 9,688 dunams (9.688 km^{2}; 3.741 sq mi)

Population (1945)
  - Total: 1,270
- Cause(s) of depopulation: Military assault by Yishuv forces
- Current Localities: Hak'ramim, Beit Berl, Kfar Saba, Neve Yamin

Kafr Saba (Arabic: كفر سابا, romanized: Kafr Sābā) was a Palestinian village famous for its shrine dating to the Mamluk period and for a history stretching back for two millennia. In Roman times, it was called Capharsaba and was an important town in Palestine. By around 1000, it was noted as a village with a mosque. The people of Kafr Saba were said to have come from Hebron because of crop failures.

The village was depopulated of its Palestinian residents

Much of the village's ruins were built over as the neighboring Israeli town of Kfar Saba expanded in the late 20th century; the location of the built-up area of the village is now the Shikun Kaplan area of Kfar Saba, and part of it is known as the "Kfar Saba Archaeological Garden" or "Tel Kfar Saba".

Two domed maqams remain, located on either side of Route 55 between Kfar Saba and Qalqilya. The larger of the two is called the Tomb of Benjamin and is situated on the east side. About 40 meters (44 yd) away, on the west side of the road, is a much smaller shrine named Nabi Serakha. The Tomb of Benjamin shrine sits on what has historically been considered by Jews to be the biblical character Benjamin and was later taken over by the Breslov sect of Haredi Judaism.

== History ==
The origins of the name are not known – in Hebrew and Aramaic, it means 'grandfather village'. Residents of the village were said to be Hebronites who migrated to the area due to crop failures.

=== Antiquity ===
Excavations in Kafr Saba have revealed the remains of a large Roman bathhouse. Capharsaba was an important settlement during the Second Temple period and is mentioned for the first time in the writings of Josephus in his account of the attempt of Alexander Jannaeus to halt an invasion from the north led by Antiochus XII Dionysus (Antiquities, book 13, chapter 15). Kfar Saba appears in the Talmud in connection to grain tithing and the Capharsaba sycamore fig tree. Kfar Saba is mentioned in the Mosaic of Rehob, the oldest known Talmudic text, which dates from around the 3rd century.

In the Byzantine periods the ruins of the bathhouse were first converted into fish pools, and later into some form of industrial installation.

Samaritan author Benyamim Tsedaka names the Baalah family as a Samaritan family who resided in Kafr Saba before their destruction or conversion.

Around the year 985, al-Maqdisi described the place as a large village with a mosque that was situated on the road to Damascus. In 1047 Nasir Khusraw described it as a town on the road to Ramla rich in fig and olive trees.

A five-line inscription recording the grave of Sayf al-Din Bari, dated 1299–1300 CE was recorded within the shrine enclosure in 1922. The present location of this inscription is unknown. A sabil or public water fountain is situated on the east side of the main enclosure. An inscription embedded on the right side of the sabil referred to the foundation of a fountain for the public by Tankiz, governor of Damascus in 1311–1312.

=== Ottoman Empire ===
In 1596, Kafr Saba was part of the Ottoman Empire, nahiya (subdistrict) of Bani Sa'b under the administrative banner of Nablus Sanjak. It had a population of 42 households and an estimated 231 persons, all Muslim. The villagers paid a fixed tax rate of 33,3 % on agricultural products, including wheat, barley, goats and beehives, in addition to occasional revenues; a total of 8,314 akçe. 3/24 the revenue went to a Waqf.

In 1730, the Egyptian Sufi traveller al-Luqaimi visited Kafr Saba and saw the shrine for a local religious figure, the Tomb of Benjamin. In 1808, a riwāq or arcaded prayer hall was constructed, according to a now vanished inscription. This riwāq occupies the south side of the main enclosure of the shrine.

In the 1860s, the Ottoman authorities granted the village an agricultural plot of land called Ghabat Kafr Saba in the former confines of the Forest of Arsur (Ar. al-Ghaba) in the coastal plain west of the village.

In the 1870s, the village of Kafr Saba was described as a village built of stone and adobe brick and was situated on a low hill. It contained a mosque and was surrounded by sandy ground with olive groves to the north. Its population was estimated to be 800.

In 1870/1871 (1288 AH), an Ottoman census listed the village in the nahiyah (sub-district) of Bani Sa'b.

Part of the village was sold to the Jewish Colonisation Association during the Ottoman period. Jewish immigrants to Palestine established a moshava on the land and called it Kfar Saba.

=== British Mandate ===
In the 1922 census there were 546 villagers, all Muslim, increasing in the 1931 census to a population of 765, still all Muslims, in a total of 169 houses.

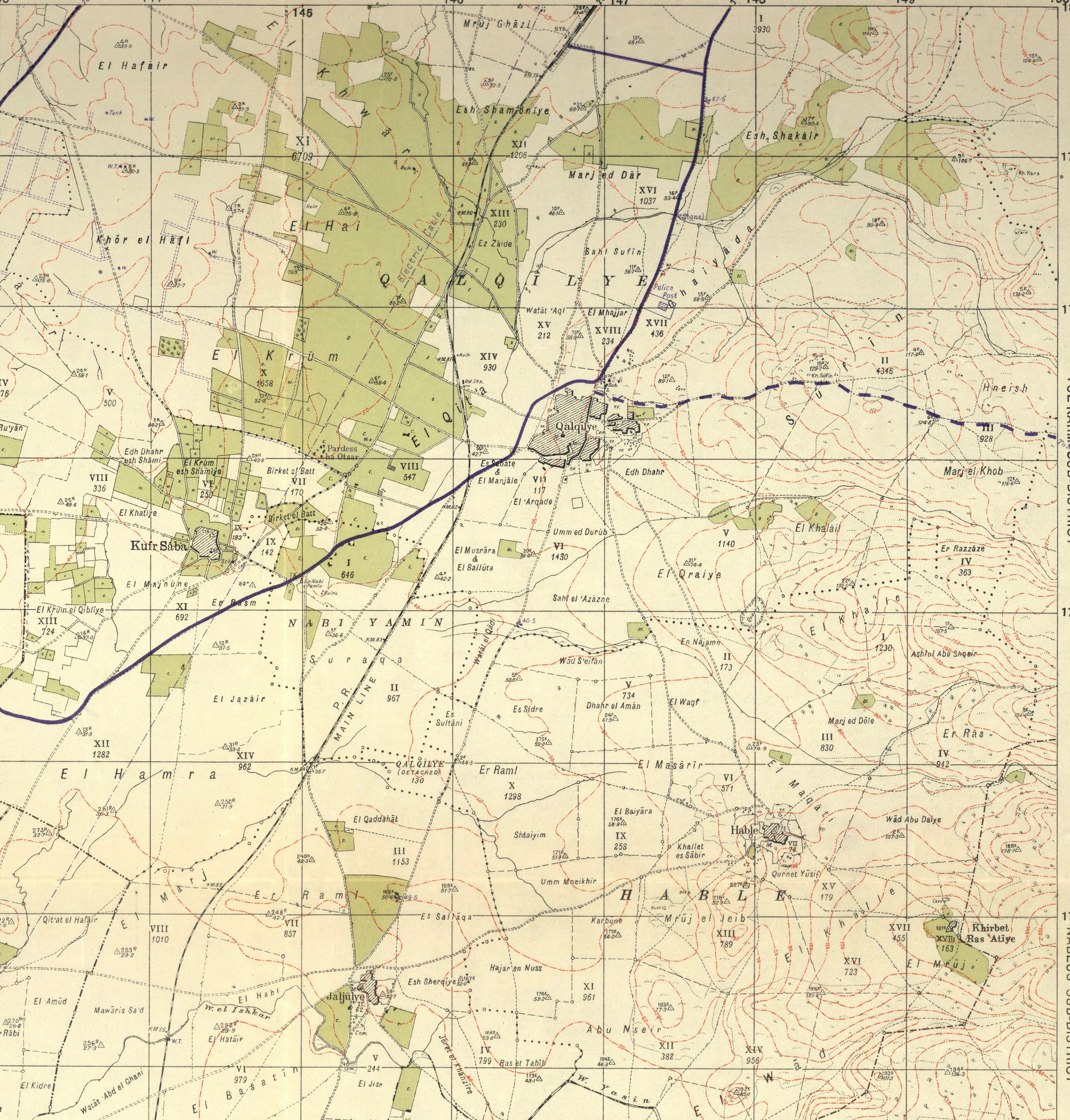
Kafr Saba 1942 1:20,000

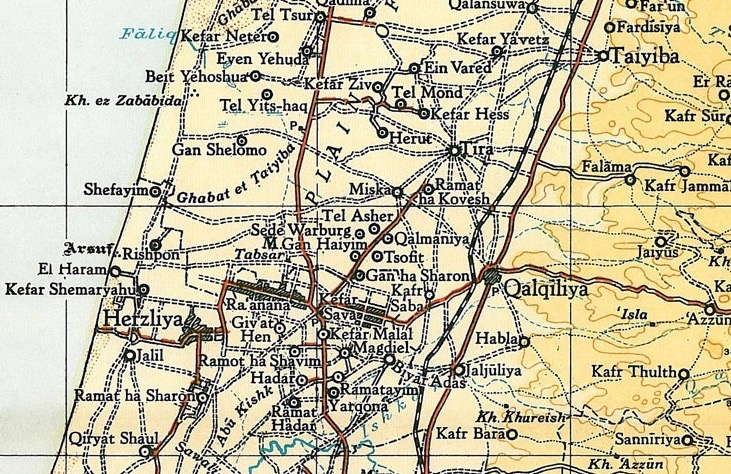
Kafr Saba 1945 1:250,000

The village expanded in the British Mandate period; new houses were built along the highway, and new agricultural land were cultivated to the west of the village. In the 1945 statistics it had population of 1,270 Muslims, while the total land area was 9,688 dunams, according to an official land and population survey. Of this, 1,026 dunums were used for citrus and bananas, 4,600 dunums for cereals, while 355 dunums were irrigated or used for orchards, of which 30 dunums were planted with olive trees.

=== Israel ===
In the months leading up to the 1948 war, the local militia from Kafr Saba had attacked the neighboring Jewish town of Kfar Saba several times. The Arab Liberation Army (ALA), an army consisting of volunteers from several neighboring Arab countries, supported the Kafr Saba militia with troops during these intermittent attacks.

Historian Saleh Abdel Jawad writes that a massacre occurred in the village on 14 May, killing 11-20. (Note: Saleh Abdel Jawad, 2007, Zionist Massacres: the Creation of the Palestinian Refugee Problem in the 1948 War. "14 May 1948: Kofr Saba (Qalqilya area): Indiscriminate killings occur. According to eyewitnesses, 11-20 people are killed after the occupation of the village by the Haganah. After the capitulation of the village, a young man, who tries to help his elderly father leave the village, is shot.")

The Palestinian historian Walid Khalidi, described the remaining structures on the village land in 1992:

"The village site has been used for the construction of new residential quarters within an industrial area that is part of the settlement of Kefar Sava. Some of the old village houses have survived destruction and are located today within the settlement; a number of them are used as commercial buildings. The two shrines, the school, and the ruins of the village cemetery remain. The shrines have arched entrances and are surmounted with domes. The land around the site is cultivated by Israelis."

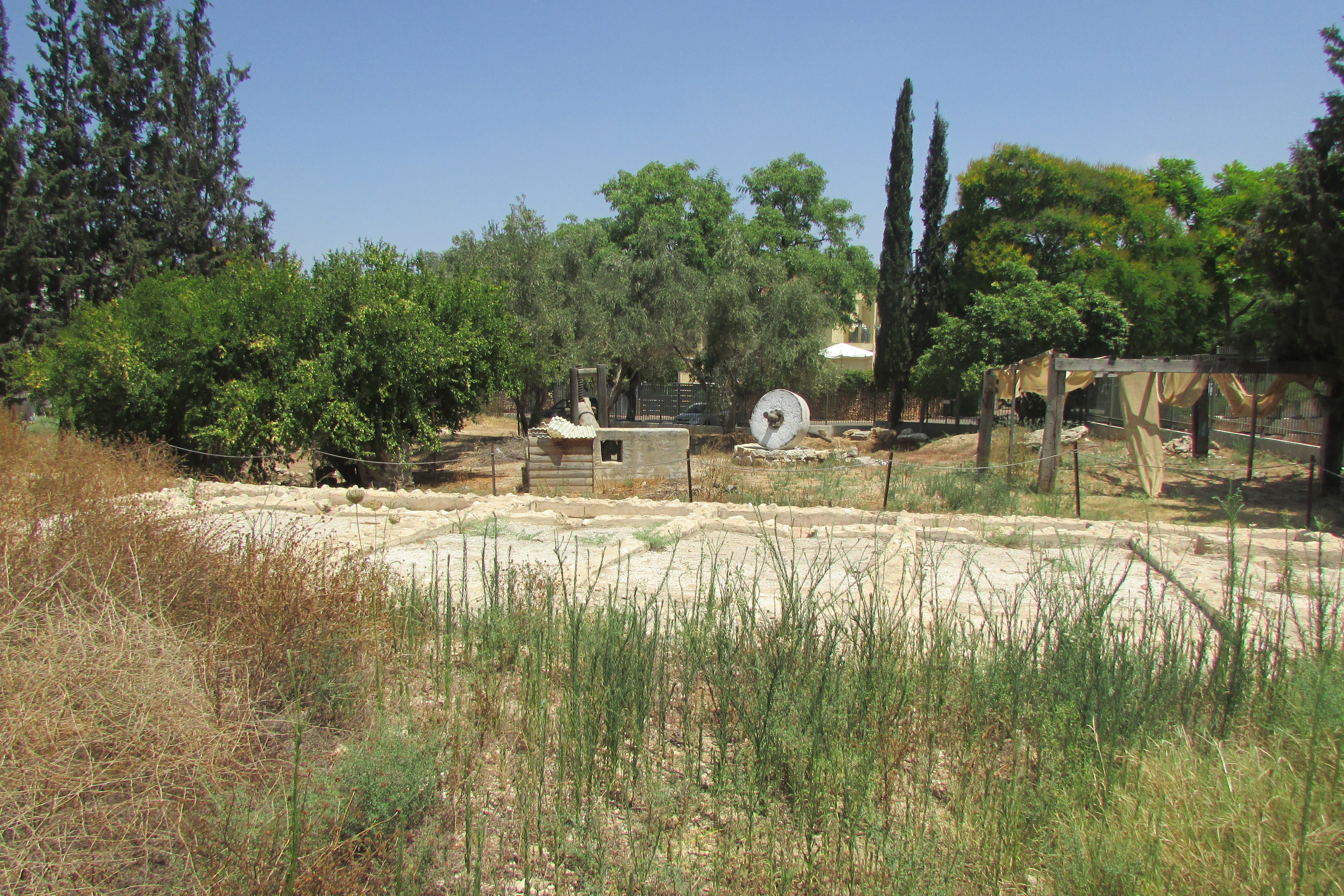
Archeological Garden on the remains of the village area of Kafr Saba.

After the war, the shrine near the town was abandoned. After 1967, the ruin was taken over by the Breslov sect of Hasidic Judaism, which claimed it was the Tomb of Benjamin, father of Tribe of Benjamin, one of the Twelve Tribes of Israel. Meron Benvenisti writes in 2002, "the dedicated inscriptions from the Mamluk period remain engraved on the stone walls of the tomb, but the cloths embroidered with verses from the Qur'an, with which the gravestones were draped, have been replaced by draperies bearing verses from the Hebrew Bible." Benvenisti frames this transformation, and others similar to it, in the context of, "a wholesale appropriation of the sacred sites of a defeated religious community by members of the victorious one."

The Jewish town of Kfar Saba, founded in 1903, was situated southwest of the village on the eve of the war. Following the war, it expanded to cover much of the village land. The location of the built-up area of the village is now the Shikun Kaplan area of modern Kfar Saba, and part of it is known as the "Kfar Saba Archaeological Garden" or "Tel Kfar Saba".

Beit Berl, established in 1947 northwest of the village site, is on village land. The moshav of Neve Yamin was established in 1949 to the east of the village site on land around the shrine for al-Nabi Yamin. The Kibbutz of Nir Eliyahu was established in 1950 about 1 kilometer (0.62 mi) northeast of the village site, on lands of nearby Qalqilyah.

== Bibliography ==
- Ayalon, E. (1982), "Kefar Sava -Nabi Yamin (Tomb of Benjamin)", ESI (Excavations and Surveys in Israel. (English version of Hadashot Arkheologiyot)), 1 p. 63. (Cited in Petersen, 2001)
- Barron, J.B., ed. (1923). Palestine: Report and General Abstracts of the Census of 1922. Government of Palestine.
- Benveniśtî, M. (2000). Sacred landscape: the buried history of the Holy Land since 1948 (Illustrated ed.). University of California Press. ISBN 0-520-21154-5.
- Birman, Galit (2006-06-11). "Kefar Sava (East)" (118). Hadashot Arkheologiyot – Excavations and Surveys in Israel.
- Buchennino, Aviva (2010-05-23). "Kefar Sava, En-Nabi Gamin" (122). Hadashot Arkheologiyot – Excavations and Surveys in Israel.
- Conder, C.R.; Kitchener, H.H. (1882). The Survey of Western Palestine: Memoirs of the Topography, Orography, Hydrography, and Archaeology. Vol. 2. London: Committee of the Palestine Exploration Fund.
- Government of Palestine, Department of Statistics (1945). Village Statistics, April, 1945.
- Gorzalczany, Amir (2005-04-07). "Kefar Saba" (117). Hadashot Arkheologiyot – Excavations and Surveys in Israel.
- Hadawi, S. (1970). Village Statistics of 1945: A Classification of Land and Area ownership in Palestine. Palestine Liberation Organization Research Centre.
- Hütteroth, W.-D.; Abdulfattah, K. (1977). Historical Geography of Palestine, Transjordan and Southern Syria in the Late 16th Century. Erlanger Geographische Arbeiten, Sonderband 5. Erlangen, Germany: Vorstand der Fränkischen Geographischen Gesellschaft. ISBN 3-920405-41-2.
- Karlinsky, Nahum and Naftali Greenwood. "California dreaming: ideology ...." Google Books. 10 August 2009.
- Khalidi, W. (1992). All That Remains: The Palestinian Villages Occupied and Depopulated by Israel in 1948. Washington D.C.: Institute for Palestine Studies. ISBN 0-88728-224-5.
- Le Strange, G. (1890). Palestine Under the Moslems: A Description of Syria and the Holy Land from A.D. 650 to 1500. Committee of the Palestine Exploration Fund.
- Masalha, N. (2007). The Bible and Zionism: invented traditions, archaeology and post-colonialism in Palestine-Israel. Zed Books. ISBN 978-1-84277-761-9.
- Mayer, L.A. (1933). Saracenic Heraldry: A Survey. Oxford: Oxford University Press.
- Mills, E., ed. (1932). Census of Palestine 1931. Population of Villages, Towns and Administrative Areas. Jerusalem: Government of Palestine.
- Morris, B. (2004). The Birth of the Palestinian Refugee Problem Revisited. Cambridge University Press. ISBN 978-0-521-00967-6.
- ---- (2008), 1948: A History of the First Arab-Israeli War, Yale University Press
- Palmer, E.H. (1881). The Survey of Western Palestine: Arabic and English Name Lists Collected During the Survey by Lieutenants Conder and Kitchener, R. E. Transliterated and Explained by E.H. Palmer. Committee of the Palestine Exploration Fund.
- Petersen, Andrew (2001). A Gazetteer of Buildings in Muslim Palestine (British Academy Monographs in Archaeology). Vol. I. Oxford University Press. ISBN 978-0-19-727011-0.
- al-Qawuqji, F. (1972): Memoirs of al-Qawuqji, Fauzi in Journal of Palestine Studies
  - "Memoirs, 1948, Part I" in 1, no. 4 (Sum. 72): 27–58., dpf-file, downloadable
  - "Memoirs, 1948, Part II" in 2, no. 1 (Aut. 72): 3–33., dpf-file, downloadable
- Wilson, C.W., ed. (c. 1881). Picturesque Palestine, Sinai and Egypt. Vol. 3. New York: D. Appleton. (p.116)
