= Nahla Abdo =

Palestinian-Canadian academic

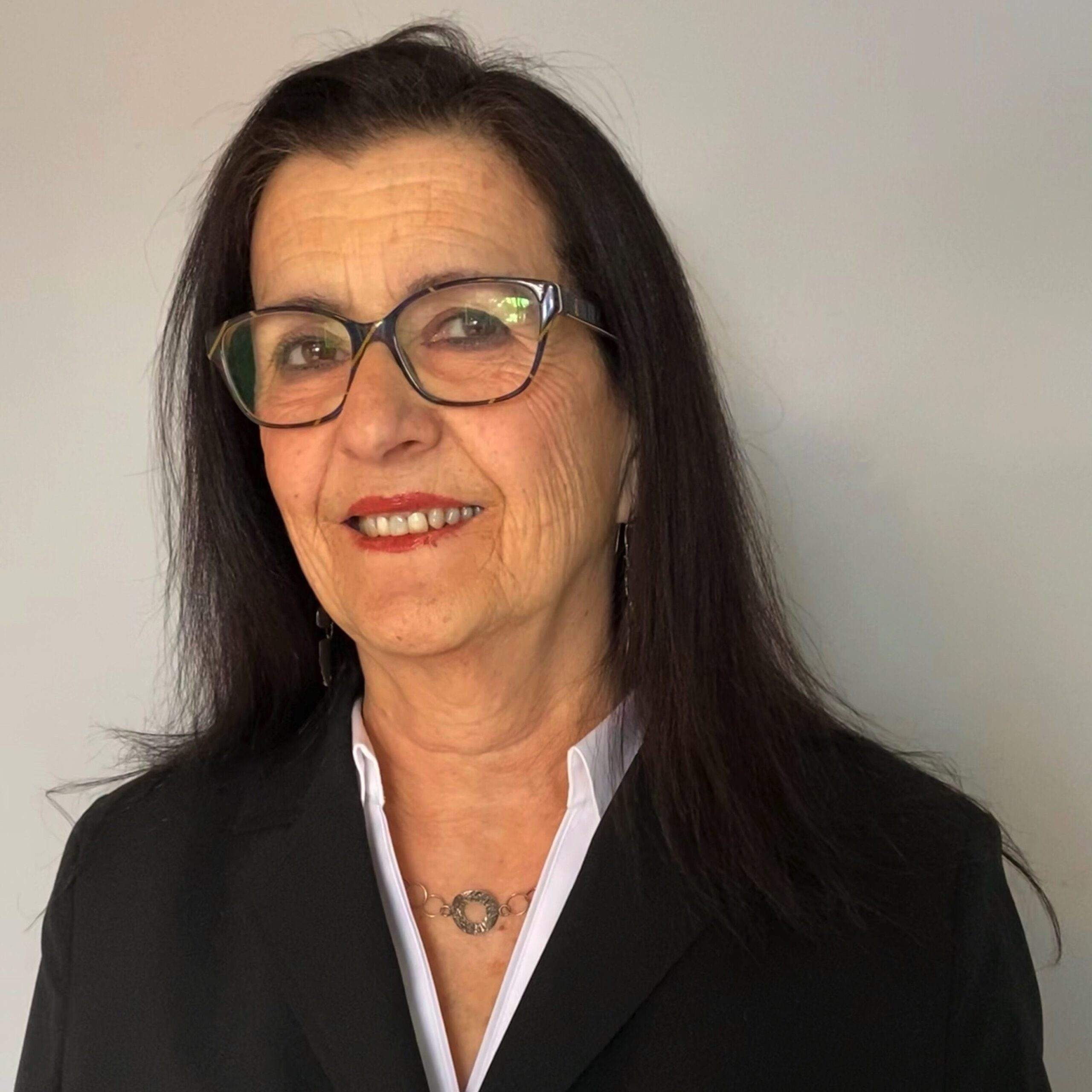
- Born: Nazareth, Palestine
- Occupation: Professor of Sociology
- Awards: 2025 - National Medal for Excellence in Feminist Scholarship in Canada 2022 - Chancellor's Professorship 2014 - Marston LaFrance Research Award

Academic background
- Education: University of Toronto; University of Haifa

Academic work
- Discipline: Sociologist
- Sub-discipline: Settler colonialism, Political Imprisonment, Indigenous and Palestinian Women's Resistance
- Institutions: Carleton University; University of Ottawa; University of Toronto; Queen's University; University of Haifa
- Website: carleton.ca/socanth/nahla-abdo-archives/

Nahla Abdo is an academic activist and Chancellor's Professor Emeritus who taught in the Department of Sociology and Anthropology Carleton University. She has been living in Canada since the 1980s and is recognized for her scholarship on anti-colonial feminism, settler colonialism, and Indigenous resistance. Abdo's work spans Palestine, Turtle Island, and the broader Middle East, exploring the intersections of race, gender, class, and nationalism. Abdo is also a leading professor in Palestinian studies focusing on a feminist approach.

In 2025, Abdo was awarded the National Medal for Excellence in Feminist Scholarship in Canada. It is awarded annually by the Centre for Feminist Research and honours the outstanding contributions of York University faculty Ena Dua, Bonita Lawrence, and Meg Luxton.

== Education and career ==
Abdo earned her Bachelor of Arts in Philosophy and Hebrew Literature from Haifa University in 1975, followed by a Master of Arts in Philosophy from the same university in 1979. She later pursued graduate studies in Canada, obtaining a Master of Arts in Sociology in 1982 and a Ph.D. in Sociology in 1989, both from the University of Toronto.

Abdo began her academic career as a lecturer at Haifa University from 1977 to 1979. After completing her doctorate, she held positions as a lecturer at the Ontario Institute for Studies in Education (1989–1990) and as an assistant professor at Queen's University (1990–1991). She joined Carleton University in 1991 as an assistant professor in the Department of Sociology and Anthropology. She was promoted to associate professor in 1995 and to full professor in 2003. In 2022, she was appointed Chancellor's Professor at Carleton University, the highest academic designation at the university. In 2025, Professor Abdo retired from her position at Carleton University.

In addition to her time at Carleton, Abdo has held adjunct professorships at the University of Ottawa since 2010 and at York University since 2016. She was also a status professor at the Ontario Institute for Studies in Education at the University of Toronto from 2012 to 2018. In addition to her academics, she has been involved in various activist initiatives focused on Palestinian rights, Indigenous solidarity, and anti-racist organizing. She is a member of Faculty for Palestine.

Since 2023, Abdo has served as a member of the Canadian Museum for Human Rights's Palestinian Content Advisory Network, which advises the museum on content related to its exhibition Palestine Uprooted: Nakba Past and Present.

== Research and advocacy ==
Abdo's research focuses on anti-colonial feminism, settler colonialism, Indigenous resistance, and the intersections of race, gender, class, and nationalism. Her work has examined the experiences of Palestinian and Indigenous women, gendered dimensions of conflict, and the impacts of colonialism in the Middle East and North America. Her methods of qualitative research include a focus on oral history, which is history repeated by mouth, and narratives of different people, with a focus on women. Nahl Abdo also tends to draw from social media to highlight the experiences of marginalized people, especially women. She is the author of several books, including Captive Revolution: Palestinian Women's Anti-Colonial Struggle within the Israeli Prison System and Women in Israel: Race, Gender and Citizenship. Her scholarship has been published in multiple languages and cited in studies on feminism, nationalism, and Middle Eastern politics. Her books and articles have also been academically reviewed.

Her publications include numerous articles and book chapters appearing in periodicals such as Journal of Holy Land and Palestine Studies, Studies in Political Economy, Critical Sociology, Relations, Postcolonial Directions in Education, Comparative Studies of South Asia, Africa and the Middle East, Women's Studies International Forum, Canadian Woman Studies, Race & Class, Journal of Palestine Studies, Feminist Studies, and Economic and Political Weekly. Abdo writes primarily in English, and her work has been translated into Arabic, French, German, and other languages. Her recent articles include "Racial Capitalism: From British Colonialism to the Settler Colonial Apartheid State," "Israel's Settler Colonialism and the Genocide in Gaza," and "The Palestine Exception, Racialization and Invisibilization: From Israel (Palestine) to North America (Turtle Island)."

Abdo has co-edited several volumes that explore issues of colonialism, gender, and violence. She is co-editor, with Nur Masalha, of An Oral History of the Palestinian Nakba, which compiles testimonies and historical analysis of the 1948 displacement of Palestinians. With Ronit Lentin, she co-edited Women and the Politics of Military Confrontation, which examines women's experiences and activism in zones of military conflict. Abdo also co-edited Violence in the Name of Honour with Shahrzad Mojab, a collection that investigates the socio-political contexts and impacts of so-called honour-based violence across different societies.

Abdo has served on the editorial boards and advisory committees of numerous academic journals. She is a member of the editorial board of the Journal of Middle East Women's Studies, International Feminist Journal of Politics, and Studies in Social Justice. She has also contributed as a member of the advisory or review boards for journals such as Journal of Holy Land and Palestine Studies, Postcolonial Directions in Education, Journal of Women, Politics and Policy, and Alternative Routes. In addition, Abdo has served as associate editor for the Journal of Comparative Family Studies and as an editorial board member for Canadian Ethnic Studies and Women's Studies International Forum.

Abdo has led and collaborated on numerous research projects supported by organizations such as the International Development Research Centre and the Social Sciences and Humanities Research Council, including a SSHRC funded project with Dorit Naaman titled Media Images and Palestinian and Israeli Women Fighters. Under the IDRC, she established Gender Research Unit at Gaza Community Mental Health Program. Other projects have explored topics including gendered experiences of violence, compensation for refugees, and women's socio-economic conditions in Palestine.

In addition to academic research, Abdo has worked extensively as a consultant and expert for organizations such as the Canadian Immigration and Refugee Board, United Nations agencies, and various non-governmental organizations. Her consultancy work has focused on gendered impacts of conflict, women's legal rights, violence against women, and gender assessments in Middle Eastern countries. She has also organized and participated in international conferences addressing Indigenous issues, women's rights, and anti-colonial struggles.

== Bibliography ==
=== Monographs ===
- Abdo, Nahla (2014). Captive revolution: Palestinian women's anti-colonial struggle within the Israeli prison system. London: Pluto. ISBN 978-0-7453-3494-3.
- Abdo, Nahla (2011). Women in Israel: race, gender and citizenship. London, England: Zed Books. ISBN 978-1-350-22406-3.
- Abdo, Nahla, ed. (1996). Sociological thought: beyond Eurocentric theory. Toronto: Canadian Scholars' Press. ISBN 978-1-55130-063-4.
- Abdo, Nahla (1987). Family, women, and social change in the Middle East: the Palestinian case. Toronto: Canadian Scholars' Press. ISBN 978-0-921627-06-7.

=== Edited books ===
- Abdo, Nahla; Masalha, Nur, eds. (2018). An oral history of the Palestinian Nakba. London, England: Zed Books. ISBN 978-1-78699-352-6.
- Mojab, Shahrzad; Abdo-Zubi, Nahla, eds. (2004). Violence in the name of honour: theoretical and political challenges. Istanbul Bilgi University press; Sociology (1st ed.). İstanbul: İstanbul Bilgi Üniversitesi Yayınları. ISBN 978-975-6857-98-4.
- Abdo, Nahla; Lenṭin, Ronit (2002). Women And The Politics Of Military Confrontation: Palestinian and Israeli Gendered Narratives of Dislocation. New York, NY: Berghahn Books. ISBN 978-1-78238-173-0.
