= Journal of Holy Land and Palestine Studies =

- Discipline: Middle Eastern studies
- Language: English
- Edited by: Nur Masalha

Publication details
- Former name: Holy Land Studies
- History: 2002–present
- Publisher: Edinburgh University Press (United Kingdom)
- Frequency: Biannually

Standard abbreviations
- ISO 4: J. Holy Land Palest. Stud.

Indexing
- Journal of Holy Land and Palestine Studies
- ISSN: 2054-1988 (print); 2054-1996 (web)
- LCCN: 2003201702
- OCLC no.: 609948133
- Holy Land Studies
- ISSN: 1474-9475 (print); 1750-0125 (web)

Links
- Journal homepage; Online archive; Journal page at Project MUSE

The Journal of Holy Land and Palestine Studies (formerly Holy Land Studies) is a biannual peer-reviewed academic journal published by Edinburgh University Press. The editor-in-chief is Nur Masalha, who co-founded the journal with Michael Prior in 2002. The journal covers a wide range of topics: "two nations" and "three faiths"; conflicting Israeli and Palestinian perspectives; social and economic conditions; religion and politics in the Middle East; Palestine in history and today; ecumenism, and interfaith relations; modernisation and postmodernism; religious revivalisms and fundamentalisms; Zionism, Neo-Zionism, Christian Zionism, counter-Zionism and Post-Zionism; theologies of liberation in Palestine and Israel; colonialism, imperialism, settler-colonialism, post-colonialism and decolonisation; "History from below" and Subaltern studies; "One-state" and "Two States" solutions in Palestine and Israel; Crusader studies, Genocide studies, and Holocaust studies.
