= The American Interest =

International affairs magazine (2005–2020)

- Editor: Jeffrey Gedmin
- Categories: International relations
- Frequency: Bimonthly
- Founded: 2005; 21 years ago
- Company: The American Interest LLC
- Country: United States
- Based in: Washington, D.C.
- Language: English
- Website: www.the-american-interest.com
- ISSN: 1556-5777
- OCLC: 180161622

The American Interest (AI) was a conservative bimonthly magazine founded in 2005, focusing primarily on foreign policy, international affairs, global economics, and military matters.

== History ==
The magazine was founded in 2005 by a number of members of the editorial board of The National Interest, led by Francis Fukuyama, who opposed changes to that journal's editorial policy implemented by its new publisher, the Nixon Center.

Several people formerly associated with The National Interest have been associated with The American Interest, including former National Interest editor Adam Garfinkle (the founding editor of The American Interest); Fukuyama, who serves as chairman of the journal's executive committee; Ruth Wedgwood, formerly a National Interest advisory council member and now an American Interest editorial board member; and Thomas M. Rickers, formerly the managing editor of The National Interest. In October 2018, Jeffrey Gedmin was appointed Editor-in-Chief.

=== Hiatus ===
As of October 2, 2020, it announced that "due primarily to financing difficulties" it was "taking a hiatus from publishing new material". Selected articles were kept available free online.

== Reception ==
Writing in The American Prospect, Robert S. Boynton commented that "The American Interest represents a new and fascinating sun in the expanding galaxy of opponents of Bush administration policy."

== Contributors ==
- Andrew J. Bacevich
- Stephen Biddle
- Diane Francis
- Niall Ferguson
- John Lewis Gaddis
- Mary R. Habeck
- Robert D. Kaplan
- Bernard-Henri Lévy
- Walter Russell Mead
- Andrew A. Michta
- Ralph Peters
- Robert Reich
- Dov Zakheim
- Josef Joffe
- William Galston

== See also ==
- Current History
- Foreign Affairs
- Foreign Policy
