= Adam Garfinkle =

American historian, political scientist, and editor

- Born: Adam Morris Garfinkle; June 1, 1951 (age 75); Washington, D.C., U.S.
- Education: University of Pennsylvania
- Occupations: Editor in chief, speechwriter, professor
- Spouse: Priscilla Elizabeth Taylor (m. 1981)
- Children: 3
- Awards: Fellow of Foreign Policy Research Institute, 1978–79, 1979–80, 1980–81 grant from Orbis and German Marshall Fund, 1981

Adam M. Garfinkle (born June 1, 1951) is an American historian and political scientist and the founding editor of The American Interest, a bimonthly public policy magazine. He was previously editor of The National Interest. He has been a university teacher and a staff member at high levels of the U.S. government. He was a speechwriter to more than one U.S. Secretary of State. Garfinkle was a speechwriter for both of President George W. Bush's Secretaries of State, Colin Powell and Condoleezza Rice. He was editor of The National Interest and left to edit The American Interest in 2005. Francis Fukuyama, Eliot Cohen, Zbigniew Brzezinski, Josef Joffe, and Ruth Wedgwood were among the magazine's founding leadership.

== Career ==
Early in his career, Garfinkle worked at the Foreign Policy Research Institute (1972–1978 and from 1981). He taught American foreign policy and Middle East politics at the University of Pennsylvania (1980–1989) and Johns Hopkins University's School of Advanced International Studies. He has also taught at Drexel University (1980), Widener College (Chester, Pennsylvania) (1981), Haverford College (1991), and Tel Aviv University (1992–1993). He served on the staff of the National Security Study Group of the US Commission on National Security/21st Century (the Hart-Rudman Commission), as an aide to General Alexander M. Haig, Jr. (1979–1980), and an assistant to Senator Henry M. Jackson (1979). As of 2009, he was a member of the project "Middle East at Harvard" (MESH). Garfinkle has a B.A., M.A. (both 1972), and Ph.D. (1979) in International Relations from the University of Pennsylvania.

== Books ==
- "Finlandization": A Map to a Metaphor, Foreign Policy Research Institute (Philadelphia), 1978.
- (With others) The Three Per Cent Solution and the Future of NATO, Foreign Policy Research Institute, 1981.
- Western Europe's Middle East Diplomacy and the United States, Foreign Policy Research Institute, 1983.
- (Editor) Global Perspectives on Arms Control, Praeger (New York City), 1984.
- The Politics of the Nuclear Freeze, Foreign Policy Research Institute, 1984.
- (Coeditor and contributor) Friendly Tyrants: An American Dilemma, Macmillan/St. Martin's (New York City), 1991.
- Israel and Jordan in the Shadow of War: Functional Ties and Futile Diplomacy in a Small Place, Macmillan/St. Martin's, 1992.
- (Principal author) The Devil and Uncle Sam: A User's Guide to the Friendly Tyrants Dilemma, Transaction Press (New Brunswick, New Jersey), 1992.
- War, Water, and Negotiation in the Middle East: The Case of the Palestine-Syria Border, 1916–23, Moshe Dayan Center for Middle Eastern and African Studies (Tel Aviv), 1994.
- Telltale Hearts: The Origins and Impact of the Vietnam Antiwar Movement (St. Martin's) was named a "notable book of the year" (1995) in the New York Times Book Review.
- Israel: Myths and Realities, Harcourt Brace Jovanovich (Ft. Worth, Texas), 1996.
- Politics and Society in Modern Israel: Myths and Reality, M.E. Sharpe (Armonk, NY), 1997; 2nd edition 2000.
- A Practical Guide to Winning the War on Terrorism, editor, Hoover Institution Press (Stanford, California), 2004.
- Israel, Mason Crest Publishers (Philadelphia), 2004.
- Political Writing: A Guide to the Essentials, M.E. Sharpe (Armonk, NY), 2012.
