= Tomb of Benjamin =

Biblical person tomb in Israel

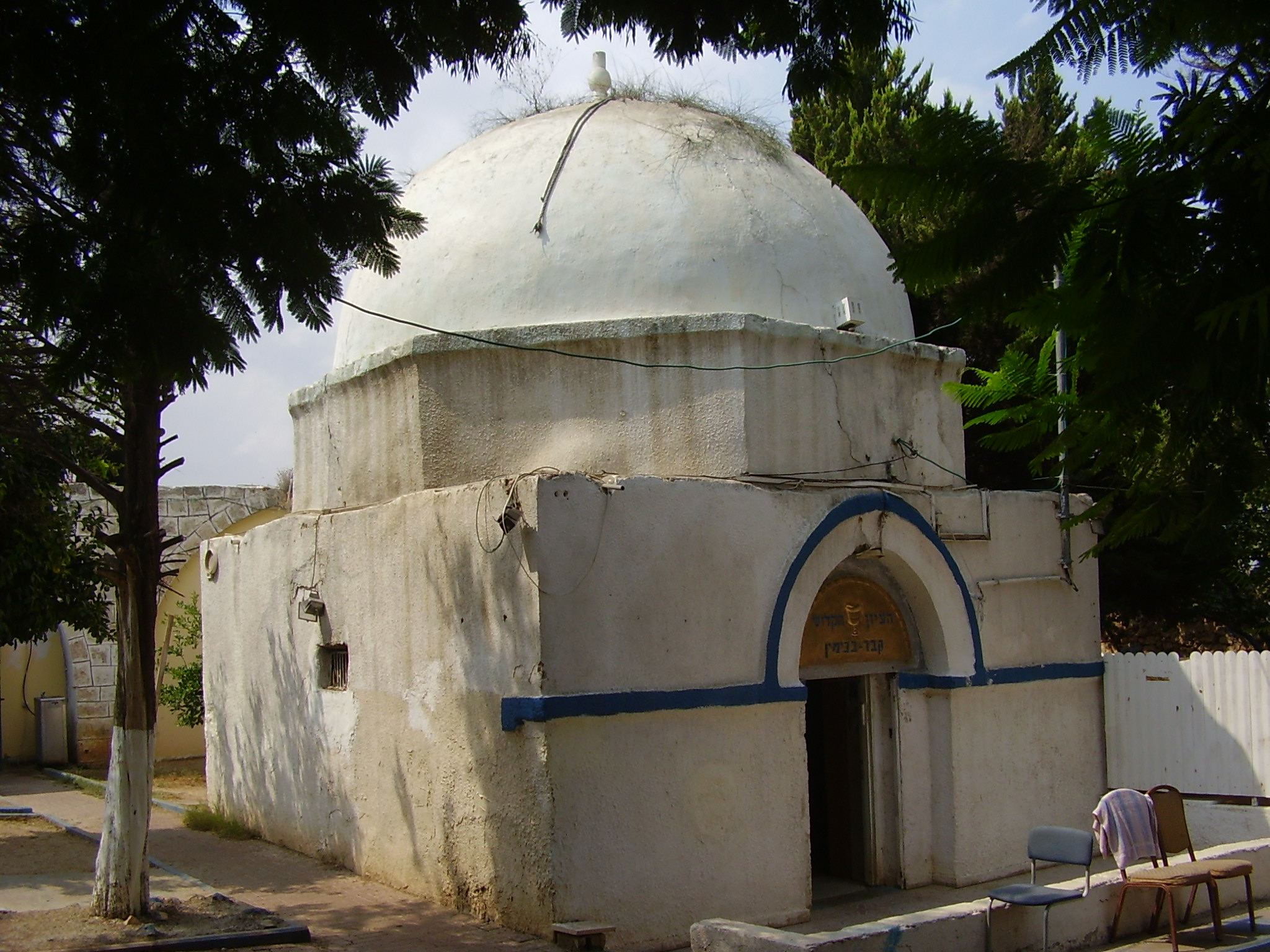

- Location within Israel
- 32.179081°N 34.944989°E
- Type: tomb
- Location: (Israel) Kfar Saba

The Tomb of Benjamin was the traditional burial site of Benjamin according to Judaism, the twelfth and last son of Jacob. On the other side of the bypass road there is also another Islamic shrine called "Nabi Sawarka".

In the "Generation of the Fathers and the Prophets" book from 1537, Benjamin's tomb is described in this area, called there "Saraka", probably after the nearby burial site. An Arab traveler who passed by this place in 1714 calls him "Sidi Benjamin" - Lord Benjamin.

Until 1948, the site was within the Palestinian village of Kafr Saba, and on May 13, 1948, the area was captured within two hours by the Alexandroni Brigade (Operation Medina). Despite the quick occupation, a bloody battle took place near the tomb complex between the Arabs and the brigade's soldiers (a total of 29 of the brigade's soldiers fell in the battle).

In 1981, the place was described by Uri Or in the following[1]:

Between the piles of garbage, a building was found that appears to be the tomb of a Sheikh. The building is broken into, shattered and dirty. In its yard there are weeds and piles of garbage. At the entrance there is a sign - "Tomb of Binyamin."

Today the building is used by a group of Breslav Hasidim who operate the place and study sacred texts.

This is not the only site known as the "Tomb of Benjamin"; other Jewish traditions place Benjamin's tomb near the Nebi Akasha Mosque in Jerusalem, or at Ruma in the Galilee.
