= Ukasha ibn al-Mihsan =

Companion of Muhammad

Ukasha ibn Mihsan (Arabic: عكاشة بن محصن) was one of the companions of the Islamic prophet, Muhammad, he participated in the Nakhla Raid during Muhammad's era. He also participated in the Expedition of Ukasha bin Al-Mihsan, against the tribes of Udhrah and Baliy (also spelt Bali), which took place in October 630, 9AH of the Islamic Calendar.

== See also ==
- List of expeditions of Muhammad
- Nebi Akasha Mosque
