= Tamar Meisels =

Israeli political scientist

- תמר מייזלס
- Education: Tel Aviv University (B.A., L.L.B., and M.A.); Balliol College, Oxford University (Ph.D in Political Theory, 2000)
- Occupations: Professor of Government and Policy; political theorist
- Employer: Tel Aviv University
- Notable work: The Trouble with Terror: Liberty, Security and the Response to Terrorism (Cambridge University Press 2008)

Tamar Meisels (Hebrew: תמר מייזלס) is a Professor of Government and Policy in the Department of Political Science at Tel Aviv University, and a political theorist.

== Biography ==
Her father, Andrew Meisels, is a descendant of the Meisels family and was a foreign correspondent, author, and broadcaster. Her mother, Martha Meisels, was a consumer affairs reporter for the Jerusalem Post.

She earned a B.A., LL.B., and M.A. at Tel Aviv University, and a Ph.D. in Political Theory at Balliol College, Oxford University, in 2000. She works on the political theory of territorial rights, liberal nationalism, and the philosophical questions surrounding war and terrorism.

Meisels is known for advocating a consistent and strict definition of terrorism, which she defines as "the intentional random murder of defenseless non-combatants, with the intent of instilling fear of mortal danger amidst a civilian population as a strategy designed to advance political ends."

She has written on the complexities of applying international law to terrorists, who are neither soldiers nor civilians.

== Select works ==
=== Books ===
- Environmental Ethics of War (Cambridge University Press, 2025)
- Debating Targeted Killing: Counter-Terrorism or Extrajudicial Execution? (Oxford University Press, 2020, with Jeremy Waldron)
- Contemporary Just War: Theory and Practice (Routledge, 2017)
- Territorial Rights (Springer Academic, 2009)
- The Trouble with Terror: Liberty, Security and the Response to Terrorism (Cambridge University Press, 2008)

=== Articles ===
- Meisels, Tamar (2009). "Defining terrorism – a typology". Critical Review of International Social and Political Philosophy. 12 (3): 331–351. doi:10.1080/13698230903127853. S2CID 144514338.
- Meisels, Tamar (2008). "Torture and the Problem of Dirty Hands". Canadian Journal of Law & Jurisprudence. 21: 149–173. doi:10.1017/S0841820900004367. S2CID 221021910.
- Meisels, Tamar (2007). "Combatants – Lawful and Unlawful". Law and Philosophy. 26: 31–65. doi:10.1007/s10982-005-5917-2. S2CID 51729101.
- Meisels, Tamar (2006). "The Trouble with Terror: The Apologetics of Terrorism—a Refutation". Terrorism and Political Violence. 18 (3): 465–483. doi:10.1080/09546550600752030. S2CID 143391009.
- Meisels, Tamar (2005). "How Terrorism Upsets Liberty". Political Studies. 53: 162–181. doi:10.1111/j.1467-9248.2005.00522.x. S2CID 143331719.
- Meisels, Tamar (2004). "Targeting Terror". Social Theory and Practice. 30 (3): 297–326. doi:10.5840/soctheorpract200430320.
- Meisels, Tamar (2003). "Can Corrective Justice Ground Claims to Territory?". Journal of Political Philosophy. 11: 65–88. doi:10.1111/1467-9760.00167.
- Meisels, Tamar (2003). "Liberal Nationalism and Territorial Rights". Journal of Applied Philosophy. 20: 31–43. doi:10.1111/1468-5930.00233.
