= Nur Masalha =

Palestinian writer and academic

- نور الدين مصالحة
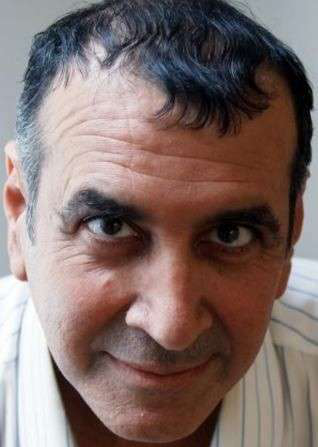
- Born: Nur ad-Din Masalha; Galilee, Israel
- Occupations: Historian; academic; author
- Known for: Critiques of Zionist narratives and historiography

Academic background
- Education: Hebrew University of Jerusalem (BA); SOAS University of London (PhD)

Academic work
- Discipline: History; politics; religion
- Sub-discipline: Palestinian historiography; Zionism studies; liberation theology
- Institutions: St Mary's University, Twickenham; SOAS University of London; Birzeit University
- Main interests: Palestinian history; Nakba studies; religion and politics in the Middle East
- Notable works: The Palestine Nakba; Palestine: A Four Thousand Year History; The Zionist Bible
- Notable ideas: Decolonization of Palestinian history; critique of Zionist historiography

Nur ad-Din Masalha (Arabic: نور الدين مصالحة, romanized: Nūr ad-Dīn Maṣāliḥa, pronounced [nuːr ɪdˈdiːn mɑˈsˤɑːlħɑ]) is a UK-based Palestinian writer, historian, and academic. His work focuses on the history, politics, and theology of Palestine, including themes such as the Palestinian Nakba, Zionism, and liberation theology.

== Early life and education ==
Nur ad-Din Masalha was born in Galilee.

He completed his undergraduate studies with a Bachelor of Arts in international relations and politics from the Hebrew University of Jerusalem in 1979, followed by a Master of Arts in Middle East politics in 1982. Masalha earned a Ph.D. in Middle Eastern politics from the School of Oriental and African Studies (SOAS), University of London, in 1988.

== Career ==
=== Academia ===
Masalha has held various academic and research positions throughout his career. He was a professor of religion and politics at St Mary's University, Twickenham, where he directed the Centre for Religion and History and the Holy Land Research Project. From 2005 to 2015, he served as the director of the MA in Religion, Politics, and Conflict Resolution at St. Mary’s University.

He has also been a professorial research associate at School of Oriental and African Studies and a member of the Centre for Palestine Studies and the London Middle East Institute at the University of London. Masalha has held honorary fellowships and research positions at institutions such as the Centre for Middle Eastern and Islamic Studies, Durham University, and the Kuwait Programme, Department of Government, London School of Economics.

Masalha has also taught at Birzeit University in Ramallah, West Bank.

=== Editorial role ===
Masalha is co-founder and editor-in-chief of Journal of Holy Land and Palestine Studies, formerly Holy Land Studies, a peer-reviewed journal published by Edinburgh University Press. A Spanish-language edition, Estudios de Tierra Santa, is published by Editorial Canaán.

The journal was co-founded with Michael Prior in 2002. Members of the editorial board and International Advisory Board included the late Edward W. Said, Hisham Sharabi, and Samih Farsoun. Current members include Noam Chomsky, Ilan Pappe, Nahla Abdo, Dan Rabinowitz, Naim Ateek, Oren Yiftachel, William Dalrymple, Salim Tamari, and Thomas L. Thompson.

== Scholarship and critique ==
Masalha’s scholarship critically examines the historical, political, and theological dimensions of the Israeli-Palestinian conflict. His work focuses on decolonizing history, reclaiming Palestinian voices, and critiquing Zionist ideology. Masalha has also criticised the New Historians in a 2011 article in the journal Holy Land Studies.

In An Oral History of the Palestinian Nakba, Masalha and Abdo highlights the Nakba's significance in Palestinian collective memory and emphasizes the importance of oral histories in preserving marginalized perspectives. His engagement with liberation theology is evident in Theologies of Liberation in Palestine-Israel, where he advocates for contextual theological frameworks that support resistance and strengthen Palestinian identity.

=== Critique of Benny Morris ===
Masalha has critically engaged with Zionist historiography, particularly focusing on the work of historian Benny Morris's work on the 1948 Palestinian expulsion and flight. Masalha argues that Morris's conclusions exhibit a pro-Israeli bias, as they rely on selectively released Israeli documentation, with more sensitive materials inaccessible to researchers. He also highlighted a contradiction in Morris's conclusion; while Morris asserts there was no explicit "blueprint" for expulsions, the evidence presented in his book suggests an implicit understanding between Ben Gurion and his lieutenants to facilitate the expulsion of Palestinians. Morris wrote a response to his criticism, contending that his conclusions were based on a sufficiently broad range of military and civilian materials.

== See also ==
- 1948 Palestinian expulsion and flight
- Palestinian refugee

== Bibliography ==
=== Books ===
- Palestine: A Four Thousand Year History. Zed Books Ltd. 2020. p. 448. ISBN 978-1-78699-272-7.
- Theologies of Liberation in Palestine-Israel: Indigenous, Contextual, and Postcolonial Perspectives. Pickwick Publications. 2014. p. 248. ISBN 978-1610977456.
- The Zionist Bible: Biblical Precedent, Colonialism and the Erasure of Memory. London: Acumen. 2013. p. 295. ISBN 978-1844656578.
- The Palestine Nakba: Decolonising History, Narrating the Subaltern, Reclaiming Memory. London: Zed Books. 2012. p. 288. ISBN 978-1848139718.
- Chedid; Masalha, eds. (2011). La Biblia leída con los ojos de los Cananeos: [Reading the Bible with the Eyes of the Canaanites]: Recordano an Edward W. Said (in Spanish). Buenos Aires: Editorial Canaán. p. 241.
- La Biblia y el sionismo: Invención de una tradición y discurso poscolonial (in Spanish). Barcelona: Edicions Bellaterra. 2008. p. 440.
- La Expulsión De Los Palestinos: El concepto de "transferencia" en el pensamiento político sionista, 1882-1948 (in Spanish). Madrid: Bósforo Libros. 2008. p. 265.
- The Bible and Zionism: Invented Traditions, Archaeology and Post-colonialism in Palestine-Israel. London: Zed Books. 2007. ISBN 978-1-84277-761-9.
- Catastrophe Remembered: Palestine, Israel and the Internal Refugees: Essays in Memory of Edward W. Said. London: Zed Books. 2005. ISBN 1-84277-623-1.
- Politicas De La Negación: Israel Y Los Refugiados Palestininos (in Spanish). Barcelona: Edicions Bellaterra. 2005. p. 350.
- The Politics of Denial: Israel and the Palestinian Refugee Problem. London: Pluto Press. 2003. ISBN 0-7453-2121-6.
- Israeel wa-Siyasat al-Nafi (in Arabic). Ramallah: Madar-the Palestinian Centre for Israeli Studies. 2003. p. 320.
- Teorias De La Expansion Territorial (in Spanish). Barcelona: Edicions Bellaterra. 2002. p. 321.
- Israeel al-Kubra wal-Filistiniyyun: Siyasat al-Tawasu' (in Arabic). Beirut: Institute for Palestine Studies. 2001. p. 399.
- Imperial Israel and the Palestinians: The Politics of Expansion. London: Pluto Press. 2000. ISBN 0-7453-1615-8.
- A Land Without a People. London: Faber and Faber. 1997. ISBN 0-571-19113-4.
- Ard Akthar wa-Arab Akal (in Arabic). Beirut: Institute for Palestine Studies. 1997. p. 331.
- The Palestinians in Israel: Is Israel the State of All its Citizens and Absentees?. Haifa: Galilee Centre for Social Research. 1993.
- Expulsion of the Palestinians: The Concept of "Transfer" in Zionist Political Thought. Washington DC: Institute for Palestine Studies. 1992. ISBN 0-88728-235-0.
- Tard al-Flistiniyyun (in Arabic). Beirut: Institute for Palestine Studies. 1992. p. 293.

=== Articles ===
- "On Recent Hebrew and Israeli Sources for the Palestinian Exodus, 1947-1949". Journal of Palestine Studies: 121–137. Autumn 1988.
- "Israeli Revisionist Historiography of the Birth of Israel and Its Palestinian Exodus". Scandinavian Journal of Development Alternatives: 71–97. March 1990.
- "Faysal's Pan-Arabism, 1921-1933". Middle Eastern Studies: 679–693. October 1991.
- "Debate on the 1948 Exodus: A Critique of Benny Morris". Journal of Palestine Studies: 90–97. Autumn 1991.
- "Operation Hafarferet and the Massacre of Kafr Qassem, October 1956". The Arab Review: 15–21. Summer 1994.
- "Sovereignty Over Jerusalem: The Status of the City Under International Law". Middle East International: 17–18. 6 January 1995.
- "Who Rules Jerusalem?". Index on Censorship: 163–166. September–October 1995.
- "The 1956-57 Occupation of the Gaza Strip: Israeli Plans to Resettle the Palestinian Refugees". British Journal of Middle Eastern Studies. 23 (1): 55–68. 1996. doi:10.1080/13530199608705622.
- "A Different Peace". Index on Censorship: 18–21. May–June 1996.
- Yosef Weitz and Operation Yohanan, 1949–1953. Occasional Paper. Centre for Middle Eastern and Islamic Studies, University of Durham. 1996. p. 31.
- "1967: Why Did the Palestinians Leave?". Shaml. Ramallah, West Bank: 2–5. July 1997.
- Philip Mattar, ed. (2000). "Transfer". Encyclopedia of the Palestinians. New York: Facts on File. pp. 401–404.
- Ghada Karmi; Eugene Cotran, eds. (1999). "The 1967 Palestinian Exodus". The Palestinian Exodus, 1948-1998. Reading: Ithaca Press. pp. 63–109.
- Anthony O'Mahony, ed. (1999). "A Galilee Without Christians?". Palestinian Christians: Religion, Politics and Society in the Holy Land. London: Melisende. pp. 190–222.
- Naseer Aruri, ed. (2001). "The Historical Roots of the Palestinian Refugee Question". The Palestinian Refugees: The Right of Return. London: Pluto Press. pp. 36–67.
- Ariel Sharon: A Political Profile. Occasional Paper. London: Council for the Advancement of Arab-British Understanding. 2001.
- Eugene Cotran, ed. (2002). "The PLO, Resolution 194 and the 'Right of Return': Evolving Palestinian Attitudes Towards the Refugee Question from the 1948 Nakba to the Camp David Summit of July 2002". Yearbook of Islamic and Middle Eastern Law. Vol. 7. pp. 127–155.
- Masalha, Nur (September 2002). "Reinventing Maimonides: From Universalist Philosopher to Religious Fundamentalist (1967-2002)". Holy Land Studies. 1 (1): 85–117. doi:10.3366/hls.2002.0005.
- Farouk Mardam-Bey; Elias Sanbar, eds. (2002). "Le Concept de 'Transfer' Dans la Doctrine et Dans la Pratique du Mouvement Sioniste". Le Droit au Retour: Le Probleme des Refugies Palestiniens (in French). Paris: Sindbad. pp. 15–59.
- "Israel and the Palestinian Refugees". La Vanguardia (in Spanish). Barcelona. July 2002.
- "The Palestinian Nakba". Global Dialogue. 4 (3). Nicosia, Cyprus: 77–91. Summer 2002.
- "La Responsabilita Morale di Israele Verso Rifugiati Palestinesti". Afriche e Orienti (in Italian). 4 (3). Italy: 106–109. 2002.
- "From Propaganda to Scholarship: Dr Joseph Schechtman and the Origins of the Israeli Polemics on the Palestinian Refugees". Holy Land Studies. 2 (2): 188–197. March 2002.
- "La Importancia Historica de la Comunidad Palestinin en Libano". Vanguardia Dossier (in Spanish) (8). Barcelona: 55–60. October–December 2003.
- Eugene Cotran; Martin Lau, eds. (2004). "Sectarianism and the Rejection of Tawteen: Lebanon and the Palestinian Refugees". Yearbook of Islamic and Middle Eastern Law. Leiden: Brill Academic Publishers. pp. 110–130.
