= Ghamrah, Saudi Arabia =

Ghamrah
- Village
- Location in Saudi Arabia
- Coordinates: 16°59′42″N 42°47′59″E
- Country: Saudi Arabia
- Province: Jizan Province
- Time zone: UTC+3 (EAT)
  - Summer (DST): UTC+3 (EAT)

Ghamrah is a village in Jizan Province, in south-western Saudi Arabia. During the Islamic Prophet Muhammad's era the Expedition of Ukasha bin Al-Mihsan took place here.

== See also ==
- List of cities and towns in Saudi Arabia
- Regions of Saudi Arabia
- List of battles of Muhammad
