= Expedition of Ukasha bin Al-Mihsan =

- Part of the Military campaigns of Muhammad
Date	August, 627 AD in 3rd month, 6 AH
Location	Ghamrah, Jazan, Arabia
Result	As follows: Tribe members flee; 200 camels captured as booty

Commanders and leaders
Ukasha ibn al-Mihsan	Unknown

Strength
30	Unknown

Casualties and losses
None	200 camels captured

The Expedition of Ukasha bin Al-Mihsan was the 2nd raid on the Banu Assad bin Qhuzayma tribe, which took place in August, 627AD in 3rd month of, 6AH of the Islamic calendar.

At the order of Muhammad, a platoon of 30 Muslim fighters led by Ukasha ibn al-Mihsan was despatched to a place called Al-Ghamir inhabited by Bani Asad in the year six Hijri. The enemy immediately fled leaving behind them 200 camels which were taken to Madinah.

The 1st Raid on the Banu Asad bin Khuzaymah tribe took place 3 years earlier.

== See also ==
- List of battles of Muhammad
- Military career of Muhammad
- Muslim–Quraysh War
