= Josef Joffe =

German publisher-editor (born 1944)

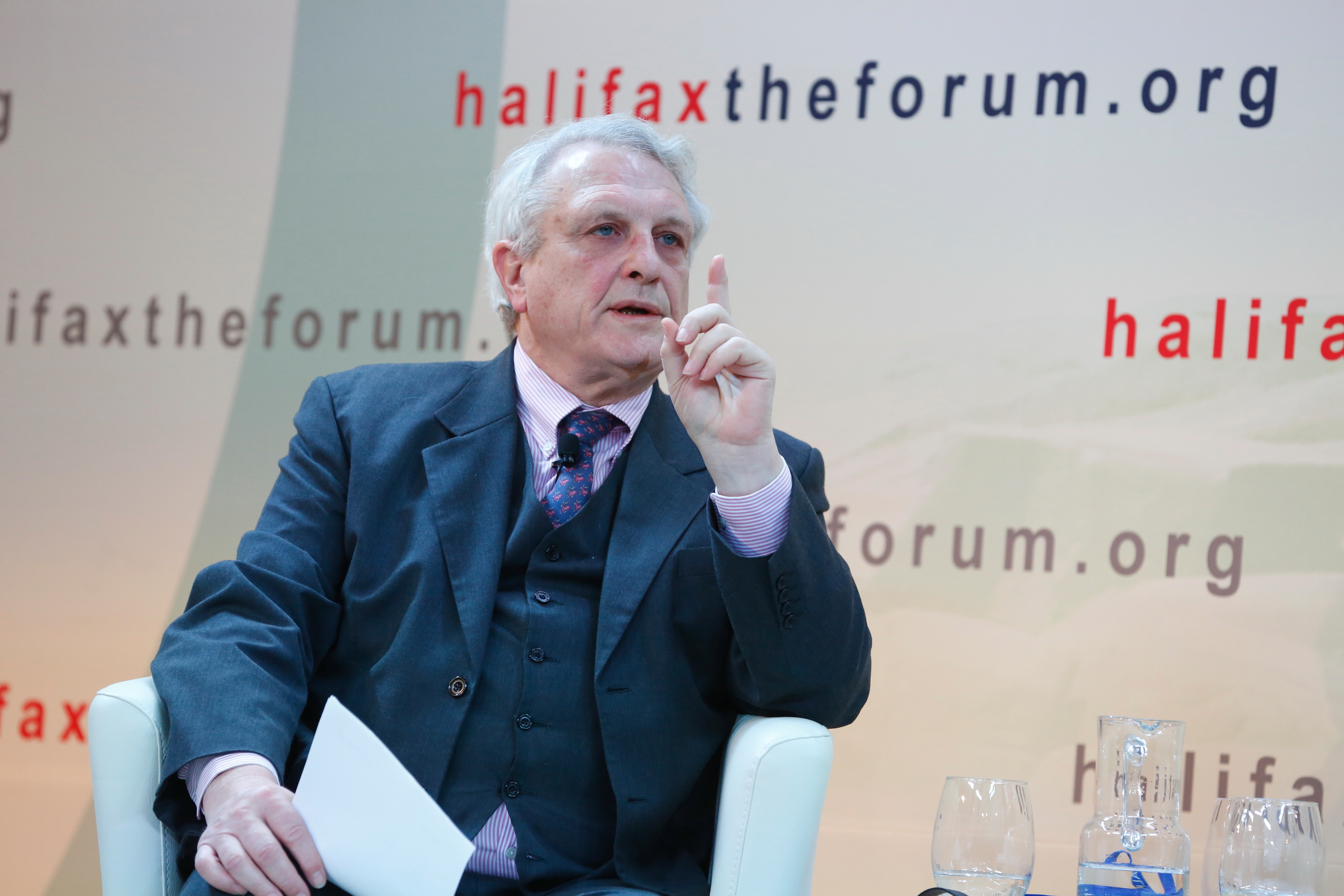
- Joffe at the Halifax International Security Forum in 2012
- Born: 15 March 1944 (age 82); Litzmannstadt
- Education: Swarthmore College (BA); Johns Hopkins University (MA); Harvard University (PhD)
- Occupation: Publisher-editor
- Known for: Being publisher-editor of Die Zeit

Josef Joffe (born 15 March 1944) is a former publisher-editor of Die Zeit, a weekly German newspaper. Appointed Senior Fellow of Stanford's Freeman Spogli Institute for International Studies in 2007 (a faculty position), he is also the Marc and Anita Abramowitz Fellow in International Relations at the Hoover Institution and a courtesy professor of political science at Stanford University. Since 1999, he has been an associate of the Olin Institute for Strategic Studies at Harvard University.

== Life ==
Joffe was born into the Jewish Joffe family in Litzmannstadt, Wartheland, Nazi Germany (now Łódź, Poland) and grew up in West Berlin, where he attended elementary school and gymnasium. He then came to the United States in 1961 as an exchange student, attending East Grand Rapids High School in Grand Rapids, Michigan. He attended Swarthmore College, graduating in 1965, obtained a postgraduate Certificate of Advanced European Studies from the College of Europe in 1966 and an M.A. from Johns Hopkins University's School of Advanced International Studies. He received a Ph.D. in government from Harvard University in 1975.

In 1976, Joffe started his career with Die Zeit as a political writer and grew into managing the Zeit Dossier department, an important and often lengthy part of this newspaper which elaborates a single topic on several pages. From 1982 to 1984, he was a professorial lecturer at Johns Hopkins University's Paul H. Nitze School of Advanced International Studies, and from 1985 to 2000 he was columnist and editorial page editor for Süddeutsche Zeitung. In 1990 and 1991, he taught at Harvard University, in 1998 he was a visiting lecturer at Princeton University's Woodrow Wilson School of Public and International Affairs, and in 2002 he was a visiting lecturer at Dartmouth College. He has also taught at LMU Munich and the Salzburg Global Seminar.

In 2005, Joffe founded, together with Zbigniew Brzezinski, Eliot Cohen and Francis Fukuyama, The American Interest, a magazine where both American and international authors think and argue about the United States and its role in the world. Joffe's essays and reviews have appeared in a wide number of publications including Commentary, The New Republic, The New York Review of Books, The New York Times Magazine, Prospect, The European Journal of International Affairs, The Times Literary Supplement, and The Weekly Standard. His scholarly work has appeared in many books and in journals, including Foreign Affairs, Foreign Policy, International Security, The National Interest and The American Interest.

== Scandals ==
Joffe has been tied to numerous pro-NATO think tanks. When "Die Anstalt", a satire show on German TV, highlighted these ties in 2014, Joffe sued the TV station. The lawsuit went through various courts, with differing results, but was eventually struck down by the Federal Court of Justice in 2017. According to the court the information on the conflicts of interest due to undisputed membership in lobby organizations was fundamentally correct, an exaggeration of such connections on a picture was allowed due the satirical nature of the TV program.

In May 2022, Die Zeit and Joffe reached an agreement to suspend his editorship of the newspaper. Previously, Der Spiegel published an investigation according to which Joffe warned the banker Max Warburg Jr. in January 2017 about upcoming investigations by his own newspaper. Joffe rejected criticism from his friend Warburg Jr. of investigative cum-ex reporting in Die Zeit and emphasized that he had tried to “limit the damage” for the Warburg bank. “I warned you about what was in the pipeline,” said Joffe. It was thanks to his “intervention” that the article “was delayed, and the bank was given the opportunity to object.” Joffe also recalled that he had "begged" the banker to hire "an excellent PR agency" because of the allegations, since it involved things "that were legal at the time."

== Honors ==
Joffe has received a Theodor Wolff Prize for journalism in 1982 and the Ludwig Börne Prize in 1998. He received the Scopus Award in 2009.

== Selected books ==
- Joffe, Josef (1987). The Limited partnership: Europe, the United States, and the burdens of alliance. Cambridge, Mass.: Ballinger Pub. Co. ISBN 0-88730-216-5. OCLC 16130169.
- Joffe, Josef (1998). The Future of the Great Powers. London: Phoenix. ISBN 0-297-84000-2. OCLC 40131071.
- Joffe, Josef (2006). Überpower: The Imperial Temptation of America. New York: W.W. Norton & Co. ISBN 0-393-06135-3. OCLC 63703814.
- Joffe, Josef (2014). The myth of America's decline: politics, economics, and a half century of false prophecies. New York. ISBN 978-0-87140-449-7. OCLC 857863136.
