= Jacob Lassner =

American historian

Jacob Lassner is an American writer and Jewish studies academic. He is the Philip M. & Ethel Klutznick Professor of Jewish civilization Emeritus at Northwestern University and former Director of the Crown Family Center for Jewish Studies. Lassner specializes in Medieval Near Eastern history with an emphasis on urban structures, political culture and the background to Jewish-Muslim relations.

== Education and honors ==
Lassner received a PhD degree from Yale University in 1963.

Lassner has received awards from the Guggenheim Foundation, the National Endowment for the Humanities (NEH), and the American Council of Learned Societies-Social Science Research Council.

== Books ==
- Medieval Jerusalem: Forging an Islamic City in Spaces Sacred to Christians and Jews (University of Michigan Press, 2017)
- Islam in the Middle Ages (2010 projected issue date); co-author
- Competing Narratives, Contested Spaces: Memory and Communal Conflict in the Medieval Near East
- Jews and Muslims in the Arab World: Haunted by Pasts Real and Imagined (2007); co-author
- Islamic Revolution and Historical Memory: an inquiry (2005)
- Cairo's Ben Ezra Synagogue: a gateway . . (2001)
- The Middle East Remembered; Forged Identities, Competing Narratives, Contested Spaces (2000)
- A Mediterranean Society: an abridgement in one volume (1999); co-author
- History of Al Tabari: The 'Abbasid Recovery : The War Against the Zanj (Suny Series in Near Eastern Studies) (1987); co-author
- Islamic Revolution and Historical Memory (1986)
- The History of Al-Tabari (1984); co-author
- The Shaping of Abbasid Rule (1980)
- The Topography of Baghdad in the early Middle Ages;: Text and studies by Jacob Lassner (1970); co-author
- Demonizing the Queen of Sheba: Boundaries of Gender and Culture in Postbiblical Judaism and Medieval Islam (Chicago Studies in the History of Judaism) (1993)
