= Religious revival =

Religious revival may refer to:

- Christian revival, a period of unusual blessing and activity in the life of the Christian Church
  - Revival meeting, a series of Christian religious services held to inspire active members of a church body to gain new converts and to call sinners to repent
- Islamic revival, a revival of the Islamic religion, usually centered around enforcing sharia

== See also ==
- Revival (disambiguation)
