= Eugene Cotran =

British judge (1938–2014)

Judge Eugene Cotran (6 August 1938 – 7 June 2014) was a circuit judge in England and one of the main jurists in charge of the drafting of a Basic Law of Palestine.

== Biography ==
Born in Jerusalem on 6 August 1938, Cotran studied at Victoria College in Alexandria, Egypt and the University of Leeds, taking both a bachelor and master of laws degree in 1958. He was a research fellow in international law at the Trinity Hall at the University of Cambridge taking a diploma in international law in 1959. He was in 1971 awarded an LL.D. by the University of London for his publications in the field of African law and his work at the School of Oriental and African Studies (SOAS) in London.

He was called to the English bar by Lincoln's Inn in 1959. He subsequently practiced at 2 Paper Building in the Temple from 1963 to 1992.

He was in 1977 appointed a High Court Judge in Kenya, having been a Kenyan law commissioner in 1967-68, and remained in this position until 1982. On his return to London he became a visiting professor and chairman of the Centre of Islamic and Middle Eastern Law at the SOAS whilst continuing to practice at the English bar. He was joint head of chambers with Rt Hon Sir Desmond Lorenz de Silva QC from 1986 to 1992. He was appointed as a recorder in 1989 and as such sat as a judge in the Crown Court until his appointment as a circuit judge in 1992.

After his appointment as a circuit judge in 1992 he initially sat in crime, largely at Southwark Crown Court, but subsequently he sat only on civil cases in the County Court. His interventionist style whilst sitting in Court attracted criticism in the Court of Appeal on several occasions.

After the Oslo Accords, Judge Cotran was in 1994 appointed to the Board of the Commissioners of the Palestinian Independent Commission for Human Rights (PICHR). He assisted in the drafting of the Basic Law for Palestine.

He also worked in projects for the unification of the laws of the West Bank and Gaza and has also acted as an Advisor to the Negotiation Affairs Department of the PLO.

Eugene Cotran died in London on 7 June 2014.

== Works published ==
- Readings in African Law Cb: Volumes 1 and 2 (together with Neville Rubin) (Routledge: 1970)
- The Arab-Israeli Accords: Legal Perspective (Cimel Book Series, 1996)
- The Role of the Judiciary in the Protection of Human Rights (Centre of Islamic & Middle Eastern Law Series, 1997)
- Democracy: The Rule of Law and Islam (Cimel Book Series, 1999)
- The Rule of Law in the Middle East and the Islamic World: Human Rights and the Judicial Process (together with Mai Yamani, 2000)
- The Protection of Human Rights in the Palestinian Territories (together with Emma Brown), in: Rainer Grote and Tilmann Röder (eds.), Constitutionalism in Islamic Countries: Between Upheaval and Continuity (OUP: Oxford and New York 2011)
