= Al-Ard =

Palestinian political movement made up of Arab citizens of Israel

Al-Ard (Arabic: الارض, "The Land;" sometimes called "the Land movement") was a Palestinian political movement made up of Arab citizens of Israel. It was active between 1958 and some time in the 1970s.

The movement was established by Sabri Jiryis, Habib Qahwaji, Salih Baransi, Mansur Qardawsh, and Muhammad Miari. It attracted international attention. Israeli geography scholar Oren Yiftachel characterized its activities as among "the most notable occasions expressing antigovernment resistance" by the Palestinian minority in Israel.

The political movement's goal was, according to political historian David McDowall, "to achieve complete equality and social justice for all classes of people in Israel" and "to find a just solution for the Palestine problem as a whole, and as an indivisible unit."

Following unsuccessful efforts to secure registration of the organization as an Israeli NGO and secure it a publishing permit, it was outlawed in 1964.

Litigation related to Al-Ard reached the Israeli Supreme Court six times between 1959 and 1965. Two of these cases became important Israeli judicial precedents: Kardosh, in which the group was prevented from publishing a newspaper, and Yeredor, in which it was prevented from launching a Knesset campaign. In 1965 party activists and others sought to register a Knesset party list under the name "The Socialists' List." Israel's Central Elections Committee, seeing the list as substantively identical to Al-Ard, blocked it from running on the basis that "its initiators deny the territorial integrity of the State of Israel and its very existence." This decision was supported by Israel's Supreme Court in Yeredor. (Note: The Socialists' List was represented in this case by Yaakov Yeredor, a Lehi veteran and one of the founders of Semitic Action.)

Al-Ard's disappearance as a movement was linked both to governmental and popular resistance, with the Israeli Communist Party denouncing the group and Palestinian Arab communities inside of Israel concerned that Al-Ard might destroy them.

== See also ==
- Abnaa al-Balad
- Land Day

== Bibliography ==
- Dinstein, Yoram (1989), Yoram Dinstein (ed.), Israel Yearbook on Human Rights Volume 1, 1971, Martinus Nijhoff Publishers, ISBN 978-0-7923-0351-0
- Frankel, William (1988), Survey of Jewish affairs, Fairleigh Dickinson University Press, ISBN 978-0-8386-3343-4
- Harris, Ron (2004). "Constitutional Law of Israel - A Case Study in the Banning of Political Parties: The Pan-Arab Movement El Ard and the Israeli Supreme Court". Bepress Legal Series. 349.
- Kimmerling, Baruch; Migdal, Joel S. (2003), The Palestinian people: a history (Illustrated ed.), Harvard University Press, ISBN 978-0-674-01129-8
- Jiryis, Sabri (1976): The Arabs in Israel, 1st American edition ISBN 0-85345-377-2 (updated from the 1966 ed.) With a foreword by Noam Chomsky.
- Lustick, Ian (1980): Arabs in the Jewish State : Israel's control of a national minority. Austin : University of Texas Press, (al-Ard: p.128, 249)
- McDowall, David (1990). Palestine and Israel: the uprising and beyond (Reprint, illustrated ed.). I.B.Tauris. ISBN 978-1-85043-289-0.
- Payes, Shany (2005). Palestinian NGOs in Israel: the politics of civil society (Illustrated ed.). I.B. Tauris. ISBN 978-1-85043-630-0.
- Rizvi, Arif H. (1980). Contemporary West Asian scene: a selection of papers presented at a seminar held at Aligarh. Centre of West Asian Studies, Aligarh Muslim University.
- Smooha, Sammy (1978), Israel, pluralism and conflict, Taylor & Francis, ISBN 978-0-7100-8511-5
- Yishai, Yael (1991), Land of paradoxes: interest politics in Israel (Illustrated ed.), SUNY Press, ISBN 978-0-7914-0725-7
- Zureik, Elia (1979), The Palestinians in Israel: a study in internal colonialism, Routledge, ISBN 978-0-7100-0016-3
