= Judaization of Jerusalem =

Israeli attempts to transform Jerusalem to enhance its Jewish character

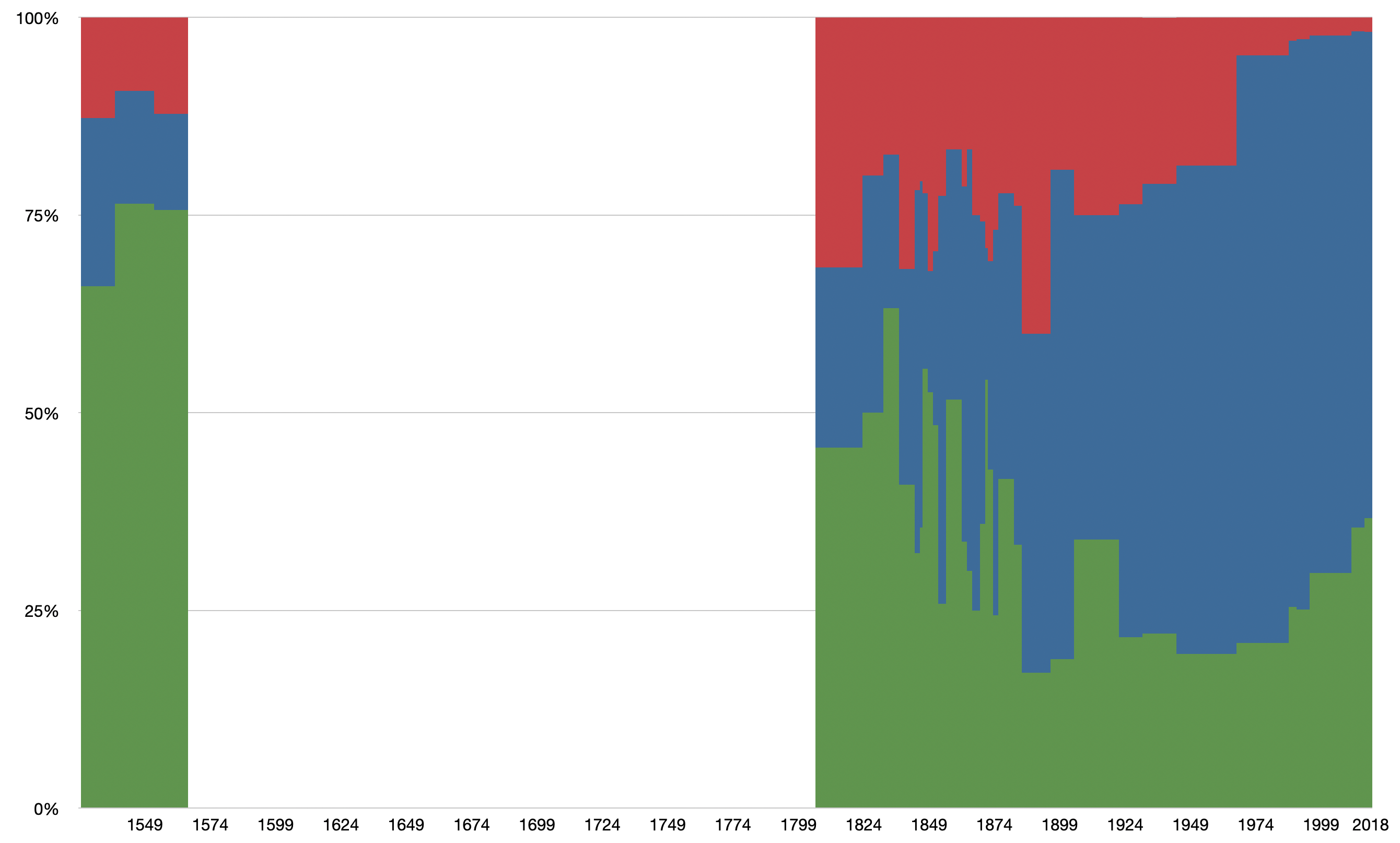
Demographic history of Jerusalem by religion from the Ottoman period onwards, based on available data Christians Jews Muslims

Judaization of Jerusalem (Arabic: تهويد القدس, romanized: tahwīd al-Quds;Hebrew: יהוד ירושלים, romanized: yehud Yerushalayim) is the view that Israel has sought to transform the physical and demographic landscape of Jerusalem to enhance its Jewish character at the expense of its Muslim and Christian ones. This also often involves the increasing Jewish presence in Jerusalem in the modern era, referring to the Jewish Old Yishuv becoming increasingly dominant since the Ottoman era; this process continued until Jews became the largest ethnoreligious group in Jerusalem since the mid-19th century and until the 1948 War when East Jerusalem became under Jordanian control.

== Background ==
The demography of Jerusalem has undergone successive waves of Judaization, Hellenization, Romanization, Christianization, Arabization and Islamization over the course of its history. The city's Jewish character first emerged as the capital of the Kingdom of Judah during the Iron Age, which saw the construction of the First Temple as a symbolic center of Jewish worship. Jerusalem was destroyed by the Neo-Babylonian Empire in 586 BCE, and many of its elites exiled, only to return decades later following the conquest of Babylon by Cyrus the Great of the Achaemenid Empire, who allowed the building of the Second Temple.

Jerusalem was once again placed at the center of Jewish religious and national life during the Second Temple period, which lasted between 516 BCE and 70 CE. During this period the city was also influenced by Hellenistic elements under the Ptolemies and the Seleucids as well as Roman culture under first the Roman Republic and then Roman Empire; nevertheless, it retained its Jewish character and identity. During the second and first centuries BCE, Jerusalem briefly served as the capital of a Jewish kingdom under the Hasmonean dynasty. During this period, the city's size and population peaked at an estimated 200,000 people.

In 70 CE, the city was besieged and destroyed by the Romans at the height of the First Jewish-Roman War. The destruction of Jerusalem and the Second Temple marked a major turning point in Jewish history. In 130 CE, following the Bar Kokhba revolt, Hadrian re-founded the city as a Roman colony named Aelia Capitolina and Jews were banned from entering the city. During early Middle Ages, the demography of Jerusalem underwent successive waves of Christianization under the Byzantine Empire and Arabization and Islamization following the Muslim conquest of the Levant, before Christianization again under the rule of Crusader states following the First Crusade, followed by further Islamization process under the Ayyubid dynasty and Mamluk Sultanate. By the early 16th century, Jerusalem was largely Muslim but gradually gained Jewish and Christian populations—giving rise to the still-existing division of the Old City of Jerusalem into Christian, Armenian, Jewish and Muslim Quarters. Since the mid-19th century, Jews had become the largest group in Jerusalem, which continued into the British Mandate period and until the 1948 war.

After the 1948 Arab–Israeli War, Jordan controlled the Eastern part of Jerusalem while Israel controlled the Western part, resulting in a division of the city. On 2 August 1948, by the declaration of the Minister of Defence, Israel applied its laws to the areas of Jerusalem under its control. Displaced peoples, both Arabs and Jews, were not allowed to cross the armistice lines to return to vacated homes. Jewish Israelis took possession of many of the vacant homes in Western Jerusalem and Palestinian refugees populated the Jewish quarter until they were evicted in the 1960s and 1970s.

In 1967, during the Six-Day War, Israel captured East Jerusalem, which had been under Jordanian administration since 1948-49. Via the Jerusalem Law, Israel united the city and expanded the city limits to include adjacent parts of the West Bank. Israeli law was applied to the areas and the inhabitants of the lands annexed by Israel. This action was immediately condemned in a Security Council Resolution. Palestinian refugees were disallowed return by both Jordan and Israel, and Jewish Israelis occupied many of the homes left by the refugees. Palestinians who had remained in East Jerusalem until then were offered full Israeli citizenship. Those who declined citizenship were given permanent residency status.

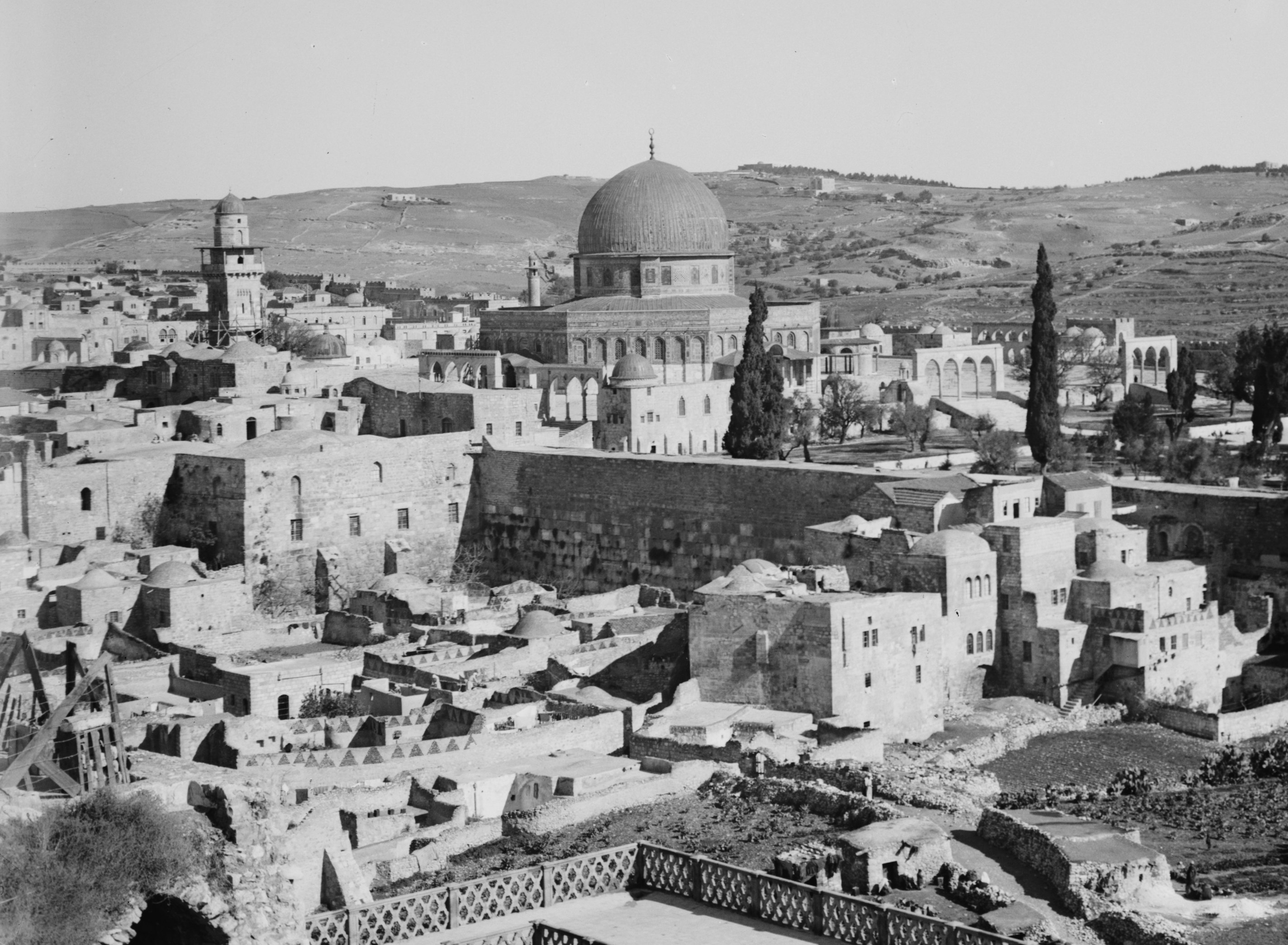
The Mughrabi Quarter beside the Western Wall.

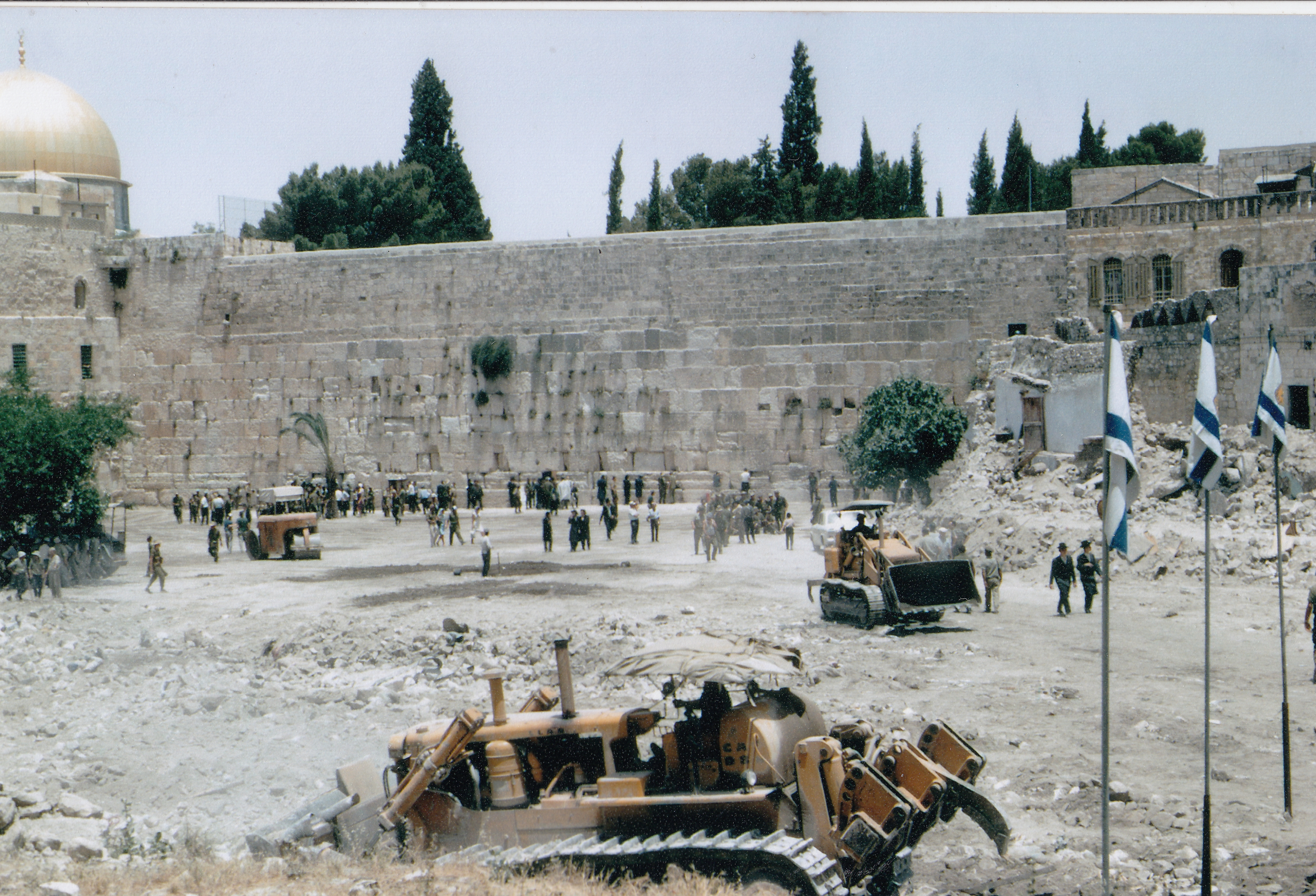
Israeli bulldozers clearing the site in 1967.

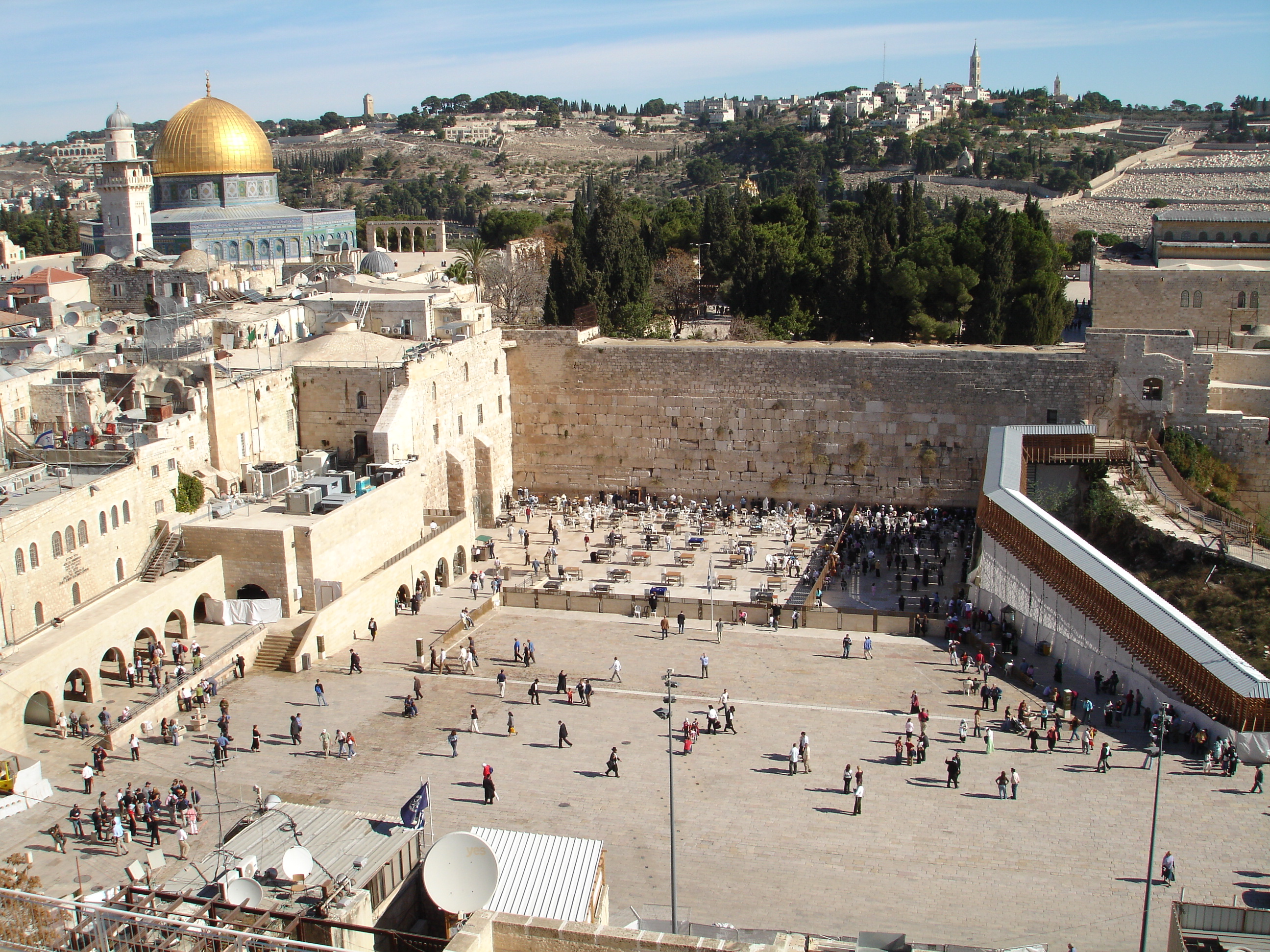
The Western Wall Plaza.

Upon Israel's occupation of the Old City of Jerusalem in the 1967 Arab-Israeli War, Israeli bulldozers cleared what had been the Mughrabi Quarter, creating the Western Wall Plaza.

== Defining Judaization ==
Judaization can be defined as either the conversion of persons to the Jewish religion and the acquisition of Jewish cultural and religious beliefs and values or the transformation of an area to give it a predominant Jewish character, primarily by creating the largest possible Jewish majority. The creation of a Jewish majority in Jerusalem has always been a high priority of the Israeli government, after 1947 in West Jerusalem and after 1967 in East Jerusalem. The rejection of the Palestinian right of return is motivated in part by the intention to maintain a Jewish majority, in Israel as well as in Jerusalem.

Judaization in territorial terms is characterized by Oren Yiftachel as a form of "ethnicization," which he argues is "the main force in shaping ethnocratic regimes". Yiftachel identifies Judaization as a state strategy and project in Israel, not confined to Jerusalem alone. He also characterizes the goals of those pursuing a "Greater Israel" or "Greater Palestine" as being driven by "ethnicization," in this case by "Judaization" and "Arabization" respectively.

Speaking before the United Nations General Assembly in 2011, Israeli Prime Minister Benjamin Netanyahu said, "I often hear them accuse Israel of Judaizing Jerusalem. That's like accusing America of Americanizing Washington or the British of Anglicizing London. Do you know why we're called "Jews"? Because we come from Judea."

=== Judaization versus Israelization ===
While the term Judaization is used to denote the conversion from non-Jewish to Jewish, the term Israelization is sometimes used to refer to the adaption of non-Israelis to Israeli law and culture, for example, by the application for an Israeli ID card/Israeli citizenship to acquire more rights, or the use of Israeli education.

== Alleged Judaization under Israeli occupation and annexation ==
=== Changing the demographics ===
According to Mel Frykberg, the Israeli government is attempting to Judaise East Jerusalem and maintain a Jewish majority against the demographic threat of a higher Palestinian birth rate.

Despite the rapid growth of the Jewish population since 1967, its relative size has decreased due to a higher growth rate among the Arab population. The Jewish population dropped from 74% in 1967 to 66% in 2005. Researchers at the Jerusalem Institute for Israel Studies called this "a contradiction between the reality in Jerusalem and the declared government policy of maintaining the Jewish majority in Jerusalem since the city's reunification." To reverse this trend, they suggested expanding Jerusalem's border to the west (meaning the addition of Jewish population centres) or removing Arab neighbourhoods from the city's municipal area.

==== Revocation or denying of residency rights ====
Some of how the Israeli government is "Judaizing Jerusalem," according to Leilani Farha, are via the revocation of residency rights, absentee property laws, and tax policies. Palestinians residing outside Jerusalem for seven or more years can lose their Jerusalem residency status. According to UN figures, in 2006, at least 1,360 Palestinians had their ID cards revoked.

Since 1982, the Israeli Interior Ministry has not permitted the registration of Palestinian children as Jerusalem residents if the child's father does not hold a Jerusalem ID card, even if the mother is a Jerusalem ID cardholder. In 2003, the Citizenship and Entry into Israel law was enacted, which denies spouses from the occupied Palestinian territories who are married to Israeli citizens or permanent residents (Jerusalem ID card holders) the right to acquire citizenship or residency status, and thus the opportunity to live with their partners in Israel and Jerusalem. In Israel, foreign spouses who are Jewish are automatically granted citizenship under Israel's Law of Return.

=== Changing Arab into Jewish zones ===
Urban planning has been an instrument to change the demographics of Jerusalem. By allotting zones for Jewish purposes and subsidizing Jewish projects, an increase in the Jewish population is promoted while withholding building permits for Palestinians curtails the development of Palestinian areas. Three days after the end of the Six-Day War, the Moroccan Quarter in the Old City was demolished by the Israeli army to improve access to the Western Wall.

=== Building Jewish settlements ===
The Israeli government has sought to increase the Jewish population by establishing Jewish neighbourhoods, viewed by the International Community and Left-Wing Parties and NGOs within Israel as illegal Israeli settlements, in and around Jerusalem. Redrawing Jerusalem's municipal boundaries has incorporated such neighbourhoods. In peace negotiations, Israel has consistently demanded their legalization and proposed Israeli annexation of settlements outside Jerusalem to include them in the municipality. In a speech on 8 November 2000, Prime Minister Ehud Barak said:

"Maintaining our sovereignty over Jerusalem and boosting its Jewish majority has been our chief aims, and toward this end, Israel constructed large Jewish neighbourhoods in the eastern part of the city, which house 180,000 residents, and large settlements on the periphery of Jerusalem, like the city of Ma'ale Adumim and Giv'at Ze'ev. The principle that guided me in the negotiations at Camp David was to preserve the unity of Jerusalem and to strengthen its Jewish majority for generations to come."

Over roughly three decades, from 1967 to 1995, of 76,151 housing units built in Jerusalem, 64,867 (88%) were allocated for Jewish residents, with 59% of these units built in East Jerusalem as new Jewish settlements.

Yiftachel writes that by 2001, Judaization in Jerusalem had entailed the incorporation of 170 square kilometers (66 sq mi) of surrounding land into the city's boundaries and the construction of 8 settlements in East Jerusalem housing a total of 206,000 Jewish settlers. In an essay he coauthored with Haim Yaacobi, they write that "Israel would like the Palestinian residents of Jerusalem to see Judaization as 'inevitable,' a fact to be accepted passively as part of the modern development of the metropolis."

Plans are underway to construct a new Israeli settlement in the last piece of open land linking East Jerusalem to the West Bank that will house about 45,000 residents on a land area larger than Tel Aviv, the second-largest Israeli city. According to Al Ghad, a Jordanian newspaper, the Israeli government elected in 2009 is soliciting tenders for the biggest settlement plans in West Bank. These plans have been described by the Palestinian Information Minister Mustafa Barghouti as "an announcement against peace and against the Palestinian state and it means the Israeli government is not a partner for peace." This settlement is considered by Palestinians as one method by which to Judaize the city.

Rubenberg also cites settlement construction as an example of the Judaization of Jerusalem, citing in particular the construction of bypass roads that connect Israeli settlements in East Jerusalem with those in the West Bank to create a newly expanded Jerusalem metropolis integrally linked with Israel proper.

=== West Bank barrier ===
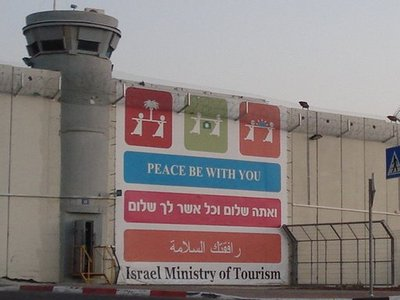
Israeli separation wall, cutting off Bethlehem from Jerusalem.

Surrounding Arab villages, who traditionally have close cultural and economic connections with Jerusalem, are cut off from the city by the Israeli West Bank barrier. At the same time, the wall tightens major Jewish population centres to Jerusalem, like Giv'at Ze'ev, Ma'ale Adumim and Gush Etzion, who are currently not included in the Jerusalem municipality but located on the Jerusalem side of the Wall.

=== Purchase of Arab homes by Jews ===
In 1981, the Supreme Court of Israel ruled that non-Jews could not buy property in the Jewish Quarter in Jerusalem to "preserve the homogeneity" of the Jewish Quarter. On the other hand, no law prohibits Jews from buying property or living in East Jerusalem. The efforts of fundamentalist Jewish groups who enjoyed government backing in attempts to take over Palestinian homes in the Muslim and Christian Quarters of the Old City between 1993 and 2000 are cited by Rubenberg as one example of the Judaization of Jerusalem. Meron Benvenisti writes that these groups succeeded in taking over several buildings, "but only after receiving massive assistance from the government to, among other things, finance an extensive system of armed guards to protect them day and night, and hire armed guards for their children anytime they go out into the streets."

Not only the homes of Palestinian residents are targeted, but also those of absent refugees. Alterations of the Absentee Property Law to enable the confiscation of 'enemy' property while hindering Palestinian reclamation of property in West Jerusalem and reserving as much territory as possible for Jewish use while obstructing Palestinian construction, in addition to punitive demolition of residences, have all played a role in the Judaization of Jerusalem. It is calculated that about 35% of East Jerusalem is used by Israelis, while 80% of the land is denied use by Palestinians as a result of restrictive zoning measures.

=== Demolition of Palestinian homes ===
Jeff Halper, an anthropologist and director of the Israeli Committee Against House Demolitions (ICAHD), describes the Judaization of the city as one of the effects of settlement growth and house demolitions in East Jerusalem, describing it as being aimed at "eliminat[ing] the idea that there is an East Jerusalem, to create one unified, Jewish Jerusalem." In March 2009, defending its planned demolitions against Palestinian houses in the Bustan area of Silwan that would leave 1,500 people homeless, Jerusalem authorities said the houses were built illegally, without zoning and construction permits. Palestinians and human rights organizations countered that "Israel makes it almost impossible for Palestinians to get the requisite permits, as a part of the policy to Judaise the eastern part of the city."

=== Replacing Arabic place names with Hebrew names ===
Another major aspect of Israel's effort to Judaize Jerusalem was to replace the Arabic names of streets, quarters and historical sites with Hebrew names. The Jordanian newspaper al-Ra'i published a list of such names and accused the Israeli government of changing the Arab names systematically to erase Arab heritage in Jerusalem and prevent the reassertion of Arab sovereignty over the city. The newspaper also claimed the new names had nothing to do with the old names and sometimes attributed a Jewish patrimony when in fact there was no such relation. One example it cited was the site named Solomon's Stables by the Israeli government, which the newspaper claimed was not built in Solomon's time but at the time of the Roman emperor Hadrian. Solomon's Stables was named as such by the Crusaders, who built the stables because they were adjacent to the location of Solomon's temple, and the Israeli government used this name.

In 2005, the Jerusalem Municipality approved a law that all store owners in Jerusalem, including Arabs, must include at least 50% of their signs in Hebrew.

== Discussing Israeli government policy ==
The allegation of following a policy for the Judaization of Jerusalem by the Government of Israel is the subject of debate. According to Valerie Zink, Israel has sought to transform the physical and demographic landscape of Jerusalem to correspond with the Zionist vision of a united and fundamentally Jewish Jerusalem under Israeli sovereignty since 1948. (Note: This definition is drawn from Valerie Zink's and is supported, among others, by that of Hassassian in Ginat et al., who defines the Judaization of Jerusalem as "impos[ing] a Jewish landscape both physically and demographically.") Zink writes that much was accomplished towards the Judaization of Jerusalem with the expulsion of Arab residents in 1948 and 1967, noting that the process has also relied in "peacetime" on "the strategic extension of Jerusalem's municipal boundaries, bureaucratic and legal restrictions on Palestinian land use, disenfranchisement of Jerusalem residents, the expansion of settlements in 'Greater Jerusalem', and the construction of the separation wall." The attempts to Judaize Jerusalem, in the words of Jeremy Salt, "to obliterate its Palestinian identity" and thicken 'Greater Jerusalem' to encompass much of the West Bank, have continued under successive Israeli governments.

Some scholars like Oren Yiftachel, Moshe Ma'oz and Jeremy Salt write that it has been the policy of successive Israeli governments since 1967. Others, like Justus Weiner and Dan Diker, have objected to the entire notion, writing that the lack of any significant change to the demographic balance of the city undermines suggestions that it is government policy and renders any such discussions moot. Marc H. Ellis argues that while politicians from Simon Peres and Yitzhak Rabin to Benjamin Netanyahu stress a unified Jerusalem under Israel's sovereignty is open to all, the 'Judaization of Jerusalem' and its corollary, the loss of Palestinian population and culture, which he argues is being politically implemented, is never touched on.

Cheryl Rubenberg writes that since 1967, Israel has employed processes of "Judaization and Israelization to transform Jerusalem into a Jewish metropolis" while simultaneously pursuing "a program of de-Arabization" to facilitate "its objective of permanent, unified, sovereign control over the city." These policies, which aim to change Jerusalem demographically, socially, culturally and politically, are said by Rubenberg to have intensified after the initiation of the Oslo peace process in 1993.

Moshe Ma'oz describes the policy of Israeli governments since 1967 as aimed at "maintain[ing] a unified Jerusalem; to Judaize or Israelize it, demographically and politically."

Drawing on the scholarship of Ian Lustick, Cecilia Alban writes of how the Israeli government has succeeded in establishing "new powerful concepts, images, and icons" to explain and legitimize its policies in Jerusalem. The government's use of the term "reunification" to describe its occupation of East Jerusalem in 1967 is cited as one such example, which, in Alban's view, falsely implies that this area belonged to Israel in the past. Noting the reality of the fear among Israelis that Jerusalem would become redivided under dual sovereignty or internationalization proposals, Alban writes that such fears were "exploited politically to justify the forced retention and Judaization of East Jerusalem." Steve Niva writes that Israeli policies calling for the Judaization of Jerusalem and the rest of historic Palestine in the 1970s augmented Muslim fears that Israel was an extension of Western imperialism in the region.

Scott Bollens, a University of California professor of urban planning, has compared Israel's policies in Jerusalem to apartheid-era South Africa's racial policies in Johannesburg. According to Bollens, long-term planning was employed in both cases to pursue political objectives. Bollens says that although on the rhetorical level, South Africa employed racial rhetoric more blatantly than Israel does, the outcomes are "very, very similar" in that Israeli-controlled Jerusalem is just as unequal as apartheid-era Johannesburg.

=== Demographic debate ===
Benvenisti writes that complete data on the demographics of Jerusalem are not collected by anyone official source. As a result, data are interpreted and used selectively and inconsistently by both Palestinian and Israeli sources. Figures pointed to by Palestinians as evidence of their success in preserving the Arab character of Jerusalem are also sometimes used as "proof of the Judaization of Jerusalem." Benvenisti writes that despite immense Israeli effort, "the demographic balance in the city has hardly changed at all."

Critiquing international news reporting on Jerusalem for centring on Arab and Palestinian claims regarding the Judaization of Jerusalem, Dan Diker writes that the underlying assumption of such reporting is that "eastern Jerusalem" has always been an Arab city, ignoring "the fact that Jerusalem has had an overwhelmingly Jewish majority as far back as the mid-nineteenth century, well before the arrival of the British." Drawing on a study of urban planning and demographic growth in Jerusalem conducted by Justus Reid Weiner, Diker writes that between 1967 and 2000, "Jerusalem's Arab population increased from 26.6 percent to 31.7 percent of the city's total populace, while the city's Jewish population decreased accordingly." He also writes that Arab housing construction heavily outpaced Jewish buildings during the same period, attributing this in part to "the direct sponsorship of illegal construction by the Palestinian Authority."

In "Is Jerusalem being "Judaized"?, Weiner reviews demographic figures from the mid-19th century through to the present and concludes that the "demographic evidence does not support the allegations that Israel is 'Judaizing' the city." His view is that speculation as to whether or not a policy of Judaization exists is rather pointless when there is no "effective implementation of tangible measures to implement such a program."

== Support for alleged Judaization efforts ==
Jerusalem mayor Teddy Kollek led efforts to settle East Jerusalem with Jewish families. In 1970, he coauthored a plan which contains the principles Israel's East Jerusalem housing plans are based on. The principles include expropriation of Arab-owned land, development of Jewish settlements in East Jerusalem and limitations on the development of Arab neighbourhoods.

According to Nur Masalha, the International Christian Embassy in Jerusalem (ICEJ), established in 1980 in the former home of Edward Said, supports "exclusive Israeli sovereignty over the city and the Judaisation of Arab East Jerusalem." The ICEJ website notes that its embassy was founded "as an act of comfort and solidarity with Israel and the Jewish people in their claim to Jerusalem." It also notes that the ICEJ administers several aid projects, engages in advocacy for Israel, and assists "aliyah to the Jewish homeland."

The Ir David Foundation, also known as the Elad Association, promotes the Judaization of East Jerusalem. Operating in the city for some 20 years to acquire properties belonging to Palestinians in Silwan, Palestinians say it has "taken over" substantial sections of the village. Elad also funds the digs being conducted near the Temple Mount. In 2008, Haaretz reported that at least 100 skeletons dating to c. 8th–9th centuries AD, in the Early Islamic period, found a few hundred meters from Al-Aqsa mosque, were removed and packed into crates before they could be examined by archaeological experts. The excavations at Al-Aqsa are described in Arab media in the context of Israeli efforts to Judaise Jerusalem.

According to Ian Lustick, Dore Gold, as an advisor to Prime Minister Benjamin Netanyahu in 1996, opposed any compromise with Palestinians on their claim to a capital in Jerusalem and advised a unilateral Judaization of the whole area. An explicit call for the 'Judaization of Jerusalem' forms one of the slogans employed by Aryeh King in his 2013 election campaign to become mayor of the city.

== Criticism of alleged Judaization efforts ==
According to those who hold this view, while much of this has been accomplished through the violent expulsion of Arab residents during the wars of 1948 and 1967, the Judaization of Jerusalem has relied equally on measures taken during times of peace. These include the strategic extension of Jerusalem's municipal boundaries, bureaucratic and legal restrictions on Palestinian land use, disenfranchisement of Jerusalem residents, the expansion of settlements in ‘Greater Jerusalem’, and the construction of the separation wall.

The United Nations has criticized Israel's efforts to change the demographic makeup of Jerusalem in several resolutions. All legislative and administrative measures taken by Israel which have altered or aimed to alter the character, legal status and demographic composition of Jerusalem are described by the UN as "null and void" and having "no validity whatsoever."

According to David G. Singer, the magazine America published four articles between 1969 and 1972 that "censured Israel for its policy of Judaizing Jerusalem: moving Jews into the former Jewish section of the Old City, building new housing projects around the Holy City, and permitting—even encouraging—Christian Arabs to migrate from Israel."

In a six-point document drafted as a result of discussion between the leaders of Fatah, Hamas, and Islamic Jihad, among other Palestinian groups in March 2005, three issues were listed as "liable to explode the calm" between Israeli and Palestinians, one of these being "the Judaization of East Jerusalem."

In a 2008 report, John Dugard, an independent investigator for the United Nations Human Rights Council, cites the Judaization of Jerusalem among many examples of Israeli policies "of colonialism, apartheid or occupation," that create a context in which Palestinian terrorism is "an inevitable consequence."

In a joint communiqué issued by King Abdullah of Jordan and King Mohammed VI of Morocco in March 2009, both leaders stressed their determination "to continue defending Jerusalem and to protect it from attempts to Judaise the city and erase its Arab and Islamic identity." And in February 2010, Syrian Foreign Minister Walid Muallem was quoted in Israeli Media as saying "halting the ongoing Judaization of Jerusalem" would be a significant topic at an upcoming Arab League Summit.

Richard Falk, Special Rapporteur for the UN on the occupied Palestinian territories, said in 2011 that "the continued pattern of settlement expansion in East Jerusalem combined with forcible eviction of long residing Palestinians are creating an intolerable situation that can only be described, in its cumulative impact, as a form of ethnic cleansing." Falk said that Israel's actions reveal systematic discrimination against Palestinian residents of the city and recommended that the International Court of Justice assess allegations that Israel's occupation of the West Bank, including East Jerusalem, possesses elements of apartheid and ethnic cleansing.

The Higher Arab Monitoring Committee, an umbrella organization for Israeli Arab groups, characterized Israel's policy in East Jerusalem as ethnic cleansing in 2009. Also Mahmoud Abbas, the Palestinian president, has accused Israel of ethnically cleansing East Jerusalem.

The European Union considers that Israel is "actively pursuing the illegal annexation" of East Jerusalem. According to the EU, Israeli actions increase Jewish Israeli presence in East Jerusalem and weaken the Palestinian community in the city. The EU has raised its concerns over Israeli house demolitions in East Jerusalem using diplomatic channels. According to the EU, demolitions are "illegal under international law, serve no obvious purpose, have severe humanitarian effects, and fuel bitterness and extremism." The EU says that the fourth Geneva convention prevents an occupying power from extending its jurisdiction to occupied territory, such as East Jerusalem, which the Palestinians claim as the capital of their future state. In 2011, EU envoys in the Middle East reported to Brussels that various Israeli policies amounted to "systematically undermining the Palestinian presence" in Jerusalem. According to the United Kingdom, "attempts by Israel to alter the character or demography of East Jerusalem are unacceptable and extremely provocative."

== See also ==
- Demographic history of Jerusalem
- Islamization of Jerusalem
- Islamization of the Temple Mount
- Islamization of Palestine
- Judaization of the Galilee
- Jerusalem Day
- Religious significance of Jerusalem

== Bibliography ==
- Benvenisti, Meron (1998) [1996], City of Stone: The Hidden History of Jerusalem (Reprint, illustrated ed.), University of California Press
- Dumper, Michael; Stanley, Bruce E.; Abu-Lughod, Janet L. (2006), Cities of the Middle East and North Africa: a historical encyclopedia (Illustrated ed.), ABC-CLIO, ISBN 9781576079195
- Dupont, Christophe (2007), Négociation et transformations du monde, Editions Publibook, ISBN 978-2-7483-3861-4
- Ginat, J.; Perkins, Edward Joseph; Corr, Edwin G. (2002), The Middle East peace process: vision versus reality (Illustrated ed.), University of Oklahoma Press, ISBN 978-0-8061-3522-9
- Grenfell, Damian; James, Paul (2008), Rethinking Security and Violence: Savage Globalization, Taylor & Francis, ISBN 978-0-415-43226-9
- Gurock, Jeffrey S.; American Jewish Historical Society (1997), American Jewish history: An Eight-volume Series, Taylor & Francis, ISBN 978-0-415-91932-6
- Kark, Ruth; Oren-Nordheim, Michal (2001), Jerusalem and its environs: quarters, neighborhoods, villages, 1800-1948 (Illustrated ed.), Wayne State University Press, ISBN 9780814329092
- Ma'oz, Moshe; Nusseibeh, Sari (2000), Jerusalem: Points of Friction - And Beyond, Brill, ISBN 978-90-41-18843-4
- Masalha, Nur (2007), The Bible and Zionism: invented traditions, archaeology and post-colonialism in Palestine-Israel, Zed Books, ISBN 978-1-84277-761-9
- Merali, Isfahan; Oosterveld, Valerie (2001), Giving Meaning to Economic, Social, and Cultural Rights (Illustrated ed.), University of Pennsylvania Press, ISBN 978-0-8122-3601-9
- Misselwitz, Philipp; Rieniets, Tim (2006), City of collision: Jerusalem and the principles of conflict urbanism (Illustrated ed.), Springer, ISBN 978-3-7643-7482-2
- Necipoğlu, Gülru (1998), Muqarnas: An Annual on the Visual Culture of the Islamic World (Illustrated, annotated ed.), BRILL, ISBN 9789004110847
- Nevo, Joseph (2006), King Hussein and the evolution of Jordan's perception of a political settlement with Israel, 1967-1988, Sussex Academic Press, ISBN 978-1-84519-147-4
- Perry, Glen Earl (2004), The history of Egypt, Greenwood Publishing Group, ISBN 978-0-313-32264-8
- Petersen, Andrew (2002), Dictionary of Islamic Architecture, Routledge, ISBN 9780203203873
- Reinhart, Tanya (2006), The road map to nowhere: Israel/Palestine since 2003 (Illustrated ed.), Verso, ISBN 978-1-84467-076-5
- Rejwan, Nissim (1998), Israel's place in the Middle East: a pluralist perspective (Illustrated ed.), University Press of Florida, ISBN 9780813016016
- Roberts, Adam (1990), "Prolonged Military Occupation: The Israeli-Occupied Territories Since 1967", The American Journal of International Law, 84 (1), American Society of International Law: 44–103, doi:10.2307/2203016, JSTOR 2203016, S2CID 145514740
- Rubenberg, Cheryl (2003), The Palestinians: In Search of a Just Peace (Illustrated ed.), Lynne Rienner Publishers, ISBN 978-1-58826-225-7
- Weldes, Jutta (1999), Cultures of insecurity: states, communities, and the production of danger (Illustrated ed.), University of Minnesota Press, ISBN 978-0-8166-3307-4
- White, Paul J.; Logan, William Stewart (1997), Remaking the Middle East (Illustrated ed.), Berg Publishers, ISBN 978-1-85973-168-0
- Yiftachel, Oren (2006), Ethnocracy: Land and Identity Politics in Israel/Palestine (Illustrated ed.), University of Pennsylvania Press, ISBN 978-0-8122-3927-0
