= Raja Eghbaria =

Palestinian activist

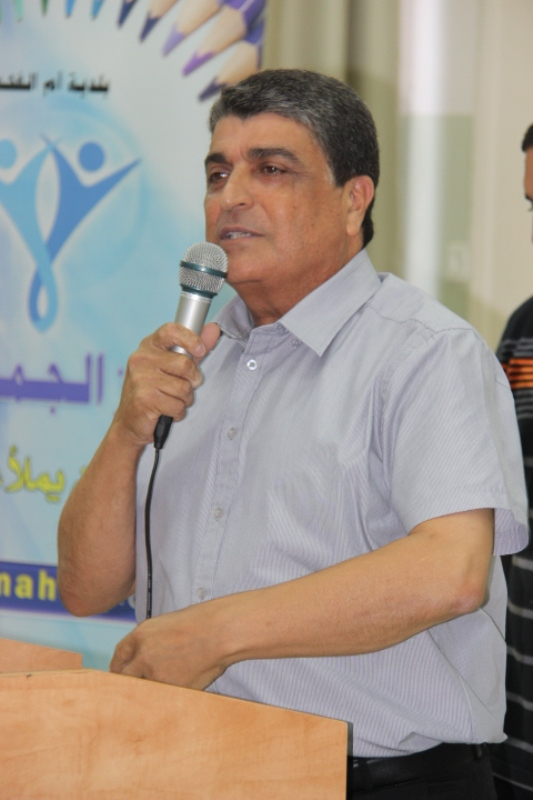
- Born: 1952 (age 73–74); Umm al-Fahm, Israel
- Citizenship: Israeli
- Known for: Leadership of Abnaa el-Balad

Raja Eghbaria (Arabic: رجا إغبارية, born 1952) is a Palestinian-Israeli activist. He is known for his leadership of Abnaa el-Balad, and for his prosecution by the government of Israel.

Eghbaria supports a one-state-solution to the Israeli-Palestinian conflict.

== Early life ==
Eghbaria was born in 1952 in Umm al-Fahm to a land owning family. His family land were confiscated by the government of Israel forcing his father to become a construction worker. He moved to Nazareth to study due to Umm al-Fahm not having a school. One of his classmates was one of the founders of the secular Abnaa el-Balad.

== Career ==
Eghbaria participated in protests on Land Day against the government of Israel's plan to expropriate land owned by Arabs in Galilee.

In 1987, Eghbaria was placed in administrative detention, the first Palestinian-Israeli to be placed in one. Administrative detention allows the Israeli government to detain people, usually Palestinians, indefinitely without charges. He was terminated by the Ministry of Education but reinstated following a lawsuit. He was transferred to Hadera to teach Jewish students away from Palestinians. His newspaper, Al-Raya, was shut down in 1988.

Eghbaria founded another newspaper, Al-Midan, which was similarly closed down. He spoke in the Israeli TV show Popolitika after which the Ministry of Education stopped giving him any duties as it could not fire him.

In 2018, Eghbaria was the subject of an Israeli probe for posts on Facebook which allegedly incited terrorism. He was arrested in September 11, 2018.
