= Judaization of the Galilee =

Israeli government project

Judaization of the Galilee (Hebrew: ייהוד הגליל Yehud ha-Galil; Arabic: تهويد الجليل, tahweed al-jalīl) is a regional project and policy of the Israeli government and associated private organizations which is intended to increase Jewish population and communities in the Galilee, a region within Israel which has an Arab majority.

== Background ==
With the termination of the British Mandate of Palestine and the withdrawal of British troops in mid-May 1948, the ongoing civil war between the Jewish and Arab communities escalated into the 1948 Arab–Israeli war with the Israeli Declaration of Independence and the armies of Egypt, Iraq, Jordan, Lebanon and Syria crossed the former borders into the territory, and a Jewish exodus from Arab and Muslim countries occurred, sometimes with Jews leaving voluntarily, in most cases by force, the majority of whom migrated to Israel. The unenacted Partition Plan for Palestine contained in United Nations General Assembly Resolution 181, which had called for the establishment of separate Jewish and Arab states, had recommended placement of the Western Galilee region in the latter. However, following the 1949 Armistice Agreements that ended the official hostilities of the 1948 Arab–Israeli war, the region was instead incorporated into Israel. The Arab population, largely decimated by the war, still formed the majority in the area.

Israel's independence meant that the priorities of the Zionist movement shifted from securing a safe territorial base for Jewish immigrants (many of whom were refugees of European persecution), to building viable Jewish communities of the newly created sovereign state and 'the ingathering and assimilation of exiles' (mizug galuyot).

According to Oren Yiftachel, Judaization is a statewide policy that aims at preventing the return of the 750,000 Palestinian refugees exiled by the 1948 war and at exerting Jewish control over Israeli territory which still included the 13–14% of the Arab population who remained there following the war. Judaization has also entailed the transfer of lands expropriated from Arabs to Jews, the physical destruction of Arab villages, towns, and neighborhoods whose inhabitants fled or were expelled in the 1948 and 1967 Six-Day War, restrictions on Arab settlement and development and the parallel development of Jewish urban and industrial centers, Hebraization of Palestinian place names (viz. replacing Arabic place names with Hebrew ones) and the redrawing of municipal boundaries to ensure Jewish dominance. Two main areas targeted by the Judaization strategy are the Negev and the Galilee.

== History of implementation ==
The policy to 'Judaize Galilee' was first endorsed by the Israeli cabinet in March 1949. Beginning in the early 1950s, the Jewish Agency, Israel Defense Forces (IDF) and Interior Ministry coordinated their efforts to increase the number of Jews living in the Galilee. Primary advocates of the project included Yosef Nahmani and Yosef Weitz who stressed the need to create a Jewish majority in the Galilee to reduce "the Arab threat" and prevent the formation of "a nucleus of Arab nationalism within the Jewish state".

Part of the effort to develop and populate the Galilee with a Jewish majority included the Land Acquisition Law of 1953 that resulted in the confiscation of 1,220,000 dunams of land belonging to Arabs in the first year following its implementation.

Nahmani had advocated that particular attention be paid to settling Jews in the city of Nazareth in a 1953 letter to Prime Minister David Ben-Gurion. In the second half of 1954, the Defense Ministry expanded its role in plans for the communities of the Galilee by setting up the Galilee Development Department which was concerned with, among other things, caring for the new Jewish community of Nazareth Illit (Upper Nazareth) founded by the government that year. Nazareth Illit, though smaller in population than Nazareth itself, is now the administrative capital of Israel's Northern District. The creation of the Jewish city of Karmiel on Arab village lands in 1962 was also part of the implementation of the same policy.

An additional reason for the undertaking of the Judaization policy was, according to David McDowall, "to ensure that there could be no serious discussion of returning any of these lands earmarked for an Arab state by the United Nations to Arab control". By 1964, there were over 200 Jewish communities in Israel's Northern District, while in the Galilee proper, as a result of intensive Jewish settlement, Jews outnumbered Palestinians by 3:2.

To attract Jewish migration to the areas targeted by the Judaization policy, public resources were marshalled to offer incentives in the form of tax breaks, land and housing subsidies, low interest loans and rent assistance. Direct establishment grants were also offered and regional infrastructure was developed to support the Jewish localities established.

Project implementation in the 1970s involved further confiscations of Arab land by the state, explicitly announced under the banner of the "Judaization of the Galilee" in February 1976. The announcement provoked the calling of a general strike and demonstrations by the Arab population in which 6 Arab citizens were killed and many more wounded and arrested by state forces. These events are commemorated annually by Palestinians on Land Day.

By the mid-1970s, "it was clear that the Jewish settlement drive in the Galilee was a failure." Israel Koenig, author of the Koenig Memorandum, renewed the call for the Judaization of the Galilee in 1977. The International Institute for Environment and Development charges that the continued growth of the Arab population and their continued ownership of land were sources of consternation for Koenig, who advocated adopting measures to compel them to leave the country.

Judaization efforts in the Galilee continued, and by the mid-1990s had changed the demography of the Galilee (and the Negev) significantly, though in the heart of the Galilee, Arabs still made up 72% of the population. A 1995 planning map for the Galilee drafted by the Regional Planning Board and leaked to the press, explicitly called for Judaization via the increase of Jewish settlement there distributed, "in such a way that they would disrupt any Palestinian geographical continuity."

Assaf Adiv states that while the government has avoided using the term "Judaization" to describe its development policies in the Galilee since the outbreak of the Second Intifada, government policy has remained aimed at promoting Jewish communities in the Galilee.

== Mixed Arab–Jewish communities ==
An unexpected effect of the government's efforts to attract Jewish population to the Galilee has been the growth of mixed Arab–Jewish communities. "Efforts to Judaize the Galilee have had a paradoxical effect," writes Meiron Rapaport of Haaretz. "Prosperous Jews are leaving the northern cities ... and in their place come Arabs." While the government built housing units in towns intended for Jewish settlement, Jews did not migrate to the region as expected. Meanwhile, Arabs, whose housing options were increasingly limited by development restrictions in their own villages, bought units in the Jewish towns. There are now substantial Arab populations in several new Galilee towns, including Upper Nazareth (about 20%) and Karmiel (10%).

With no guiding policy of the national government to deal with this integration, local regional councils have been left to themselves to deal with these developments. For example, the Menashe regional council, in the lower Galilee, elected to send its municipal workers to Arabic courses in order to provide services to their Arab residents; the Misgav Regional Council has declared that "cooperation between all sectors ... Jewish and Arab" is a development objective, though Jewish–Arab relations have not been without problems.

Israeli nongovernmental organizations (NGOs) have taken a leading role in developing programs to promote integration and to militate for government development policies. "Promoting a shared society in mixed areas needs to be focused on specific policy planning, and must be managed with a multifaceted approach including socioeconomic, educational, public and governmental considerations," writes Amnon Be'eri-Sulitzeanu, co-executive director of the Abraham Fund. "It is vital to recognize that Israel today is a mixed country. Policy aimed at improving the nature of Jewish–Arab relations in mixed cities and regions is of primary and paramount importance for the future of the state."

== See also ==
- Judaization of Jerusalem
- Islamization of East Jerusalem under Jordanian rule
- Islamization of the Temple Mount
- Islam in Palestine

== Bibliography ==
- Ben-Ami, Shlomo; Peled, Yoav; Spektorowski, Alberto (2000). Ethnic challenges to the modern nation state (Illustrated ed.). Palgrave Macmillan. ISBN 978-0-312-23053-1.
- Falah, Ghazi (1991). "Israeli "Judaization" Policy in Galilee". Journal of Palestine Studies. 20 (4). University of California Press on behalf of the Institute for Palestine Studies: 69–85. doi:10.1525/jps.1991.20.4.00p0268u. JSTOR 2537436.
- Holzman-Gazit, Yifat (2007). Land expropriation in Israel: law, culture and society. Ashgate Publishing, Ltd. ISBN 978-0-7546-2543-8.
- Firro, Kais (1999). The Druzes in the Jewish state: a brief history (Illustrated ed.). BRILL. ISBN 9789004112513.
- Kanaaneh, Rhoda Ann (2002). Birthing the nation: strategies of Palestinian women in Israel (Illustrated ed.). University of California Press. p. 53. ISBN 978-0-520-22379-0. "judaization galilee."
- International Institute for Environment & Development (IIED) (1994). Evictions - 7010iied. IIED. ISBN 978-1-84369-082-5.
- Kimmerling, Baruch; Migdal, Joel S. (2003). The Palestinian people: a history (Illustrated ed.). Harvard University Press. ISBN 9780674011298.
- Lustick, Ian (1980). Arabs in the Jewish State: Israel's control of a national minority (2nd ed.). University of Texas Press. ISBN 978-0-292-70347-6.
- McDowall, David (1991). Palestine and Israel: The Uprising and Beyond (Reprint, illustrated ed.). University of California Press. ISBN 978-0-520-07653-2.
- Rabinowitz, Dan (1997). Overlooking Nazareth: the ethnography of exclusion in Galilee (Illustrated ed.). Cambridge University Press. ISBN 978-0-521-56495-3.
- Sufian, Sandra Marlene; LeVine, Mark (2007). Reapproaching borders: new perspectives on the study of Israel-Palestine (Illustrated ed.). Rowman & Littlefield. ISBN 9780742546394.
- Wesley, David A. (2006). State practices and Zionist images: shaping economic development in Arab towns in Israel (Illustrated ed.). Berghahn Books. ISBN 9781845450588.
- Yacobi, Haim (2009). The Jewish-Arab city: spatio-politics in a mixed community (Illustrated ed.). Taylor & Francis. ISBN 978-0-415-44500-9.
- Yiftachel, Oren (2001). Oren Yiftachel; Jo Little; David Hedgcock (eds.). The power of planning: spaces of control and transformation (Illustrated ed.). Springer. ISBN 978-1-4020-0534-3.
