= Judaization =

Judaization (Hebrew: ייהוד, Arabic: تهويد) or Judaification is the process of making something Jewish in character. In a religious context, this practice is uncommon, due to the Jewish aversion to conversion, supporting conversion only as a fully voluntary measure. In practice, this has only applied in Jewish states, especially in ancient Judea, or in the context of Abrahamic religions, which are born out of Judaism, such as early Christianity.

== Ancient Judea ==
During his conquests of Idumea, John Hyrcanus, then Prince and High Priest of Judea, encountered the Idumeans, also known in the Iron Age as the Edomites. Given that the Idumeans were worshipers of a syncretic religion which merged the religion of the Canaanites with ancient Arab polytheism, this meant that they were idolaters by Jewish law, something which was prohibited in the Ten Commandments. The conquest also came of the heels of Hyrcanus' conquest of Samaria, a region inhabited by the descendants of the northern Kingdom of Israel who worshiped their own religion that, while very similar to Judaism, was still different in that it proclaimed that they proclaimed that Mount Gerizim at the city of Shechem was the real legitimate site of God's temple, not the temple in Jerusalem at Mount Zion. In effect, after conquering Idumea, this would have meant Judea was a Jewish kingdom with a minority-Jewish population. In order to remedy this, Hyrcanus forcefully converted all of the Iudmeans to Judaism, an act so controversial to the Jews of Judea itself that it led to the split in the Sanhedrin between the Pharisees, who believed in religious toleration and opposed both the forced conversion of the Idumeans and Hycanus' dual role as High Priest and Prince, versus the Sadducees, who supported the Judaization of the Idumeans and were willing to defend Hyrcanus' dual role.

== Zionism ==
In the context of Zionism, it is often applied to the Israeli expansion of Jewish settlement in areas with significant Palestinian populations, as in the Judaization of Jerusalem, the Galilee, or the Negev. In this context, it is related to de-Arabization.

In his critique of Zionism, the British thinker Leon Roth argued for a "Judaization of our politics" in response to what he perceived as a "politicization of Judaism" characterized by ethno-nationalism and an almost racial notion of Jewishness.

== See also ==
- Hebraization of English
- Hebraization of surnames
- Hebraization of Palestinian place names
- Judaization of the Galilee
- Judaization of Jerusalem
- Christianization
- Islamisation
