= Koenig Memorandum =

The Koenig Memorandum (also known as The Koenig Report) was a confidential and internal Israeli government document authored in April 1976 by Yisrael Koenig, a member of the Alignment (then the ruling party), who served as the Northern District Commissioner of the Ministry of the Interior for 26 years.

The document put forward a number of strategic goals and tactical steps aimed at reducing the number and influence of Arab citizens of Israel in the Galilee region. Outlining what he viewed as "objective thought that ensures the long-term Jewish national interests," Koenig stressed the need to "examine the possibility of diluting existing Arab population concentrations".

The leaking of the report by the Israeli newspaper Al-Hamishmar is frequently referred to as "a major turning point in the relationship between the Israeli State and the Palestinian minority."

== Background ==
The Koenig Memorandum was the first publicly available document to outline some of the "policies of discrimination and containment" that Palestinian citizens have been subject to since 1948, reflecting "planning and deliberations at the policy-making circles." Its publication also exposed policy options that Israeli policy makers were considering prior to Land Day, as its first (main) section was finalized on 1 March - one month before the events of Land Day.

Although the Israeli Government never officially acknowledged that official government policies were guided by this plan, some of Koenig's recommendations were implemented, particularly those regarding the expansion of land expropriations from Arab owners and the establishment of new Jewish settlements in the area in order to fragment and contain the Palestinian Arab population in Israel.

Additionally, both the Tel Aviv magazine, New Outlook and the New York newspaper Jewish Press reported in the fall of 1976 that Koenig had collaborated with prominent activists in Mapai, the party of Ben-Gurion, Eshkol, Meir, Peres and Rabin to prepare the report, and that Zvi Aldoraty, Mapai candidate for Director of Arab Affairs, was a major co-author.

== Public reception ==
The Koenig Memorandum came to the public’s attention in September 1976, when it was reprinted in full in Al Hamishmar, a Hebrew-language newspaper in Israel.

Its publication provoked widespread debate in both the domestic and international arena.

=== International reaction ===
The comments of the Egyptian Representative to the United Nations Security Council, Ahmed Asmat Abdel-Meguid, provide one illustration of such debate in the international arena. At a meeting of the Security Council on November 1, 1976, Meguid stated, “The aims of the Israeli Government are well known, but recently one of these official plans came to the notice of public opinion: it is a secret document, known as the Koenig memorandum, presented to the Office of the Prime Minister by Mr. Koenig, who is a high official in the Israeli Interior Ministry and is responsible for the treatment of Arabs in Israel. The Israeli Government is somewhat embarrassed — or so it says — not because of the contents of this memorandum, but only because it was brought to the attention of world public opinion.”

=== Domestic reaction ===
Domestically in Israel, the memorandum’s publication was received with a generally more muted response. The Israeli newspaper, Yedioth Ahronoth reported on September 7 that senior elements close to the Prime Minister attached importance to the Koenig report. Israeli radio on September 8 reported that Interior Minister, Yosef Burg, reacted to the document’s publication by saying that he had complete faith in Mr. Koenig.

On September 9, Haaretz newspaper reported that Amos Eiran, Director General of the Israeli Prime Minister’s Office, deplored the "leaking" of the Koenig Report by Al-Hamishmar, but no governmental figures repudiated its recommendations.

Ahmad H. Sa'di, a lecturer in the Department of Politics and Government at the Ben-Gurion University of the Negev in Israel claims that "The racist language of the Report and its draconian suggestions caused wide-ranging indignation by Palestinians. However, State officials dismissed this reaction as unwarranted. They maintained that the Report represented the opinion of its author(s), and did not represent an official policy nor did it reflect the mode of thinking in decision-making circles. The debates that followed the Report's publication have mostly centered on the limits of freedom of expression (and racism) that civil servants ought to observe, instead of dealing with the premises of the State policy towards the minority."

== Main content ==
The first section of Koenig's report is entitled, "The Demographic Problem and the Manifestations of Arab Nationalism." In this section, Koenig claims that the Arab population of the Galilee region would constitute a majority (51%) of the population there by 1978 and that this, along with rising "nationalistic" sentiments "will endanger our control of that area." He then proceeds to review the organizational capabilities of the Rakah party, foreshadowing and reflecting the important role they played in Land Day demonstrations that took place on March 30, 1976, in which six Arab citizens of Israel were killed by the IDF and Israel Police.

In her book, "The Fate of the Jews: A People Torn Between Israeli Power and Jewish Ethics", Roberta Strauss Feuerlicht summarizes some of the major strategic objectives and tactical steps endorsed by The Koenig Memorandum, as follows:

- To preclude any possibility of an (independent, Arab) political union, Koenig recommended building more Jewish settlements in areas that are predominantly Arab.
- Hostile Arab leaders should be replaced by compliant ones, whom Israel was to ‘create.’ Koenig wanted the number of Arab intellectuals reduced, because their frustration is potentially dangerous. He would encourage "the channeling of [Arab] students into technical professions, the physical and natural sciences. These studies leave less time for dabbling in nationalism and the dropout rate is higher." Koenig wanted to make it easier for Arabs to study abroad and harder for them to return and find jobs. Graduates who did remain in Israel were to be coopted.
- Koenig also proposed mounting a smear campaign against Arab activists, reducing liquid savings to limit funds available in the Arab community to support political causes, and reducing the effectiveness of Arab student organizations.

Further elements in the memorandum included Koenig's reflection that, "Social and economic security free[s] the individual and the family from economic worries ... and give[s] him, consciously and subconsciously, leisure time for social and nationalistic thoughts that are exploited by hostile elements to generate ferment and bitterness." As one practical measure to help obviate this end, Koenig proposed "neutralizing grants to large families."

An English translation of the full report appeared in SWASIA.

== References to the Koenig Memorandum in books on the Middle East ==
In his book, Deliberate Deceptions: Facing the Facts About The U.S.-Israeli Relationship, Paul Findley cites among other examples, the recommendations of the Koenig Memorandum, to refute the common pro-Zionist assessment that Jewish citizens of Israel "do not have more rights than their non-Jewish fellows." He notes that these recommendations included encouraging emigration of Palestinian Arabs through study abroad programs and giving "preferential treatment to Jewish groups or individuals rather than to Arabs." Edward Said thoroughly analysed the Memorandum in his book The Question of Palestine, first published in 1979. According to him, "Nothing in Koenig's report conflicts with the basic dichotomy in Zionism, that is, benevolence toward Jews and an essential but paternalistic hostility toward Arabs".

== Later statements by Yisrael Koenig ==
In 2002, Yisrael Koenig, by then a pensioner, was quoted in Haaretz's online English Edition as saying that Israel's Arabs "only want to suck the best out of us." He further related a story about a friend of his, "a rich Christian from Nazareth," who is grateful to him for Koenig's having persuaded him to immigrate to Canada. Koenig relates that the rationale he used was: "Your children will never have it good here."

== See also ==
- Demographic threat (Israel)
- Judaization of the Galilee
