= Habib Qahwaji =

Palestinian teacher, writer and political activist (1932–2023)

- Born: Habib Nofal Qahwaji; 1932; Fassuta, Mandate Palestine
- Died: 17 March 2023 (aged 90–91); France
- Occupations: Teacher; Writer

Habib Qahwaji (1932–2023) was a Palestinian teacher, writer and political activist. He is known for being one of the founders of the Al Ard movement based in Israel. He was a member of the executive committee of the Palestine Liberation Organization (PLO) from 1977 to 1981. He was one of the Palestinian activists who presented new ways of thinking about the Palestine cause.

== Early life ==
Qahwaji was born in Fassuta, Upper Galilee, Palestine, in 1932. He hailed from a Greek Orthodox family. His father, Nofal, was one of the early teachers in the region.

== Career and activities ==
Qahwaji worked as a teacher of Arabic language at the Orthodox Secondary School in Haifa. He also taught at the Terra Sancta College in Nazareth. He was a member of the Arab Popular Front. Following the dissolution of the Front he founded a pan-Arab movement, Al Ard, in Israel in 1959 together with Mansur Qardawsh. The founding meeting of the movement was held in Nazareth in April 1959. The other leading figures of Al Ard included Sabri Jiryis, Salih Baransi, and Muhammad Miari. The movement was a supporter of Nasserism. The group launched a newspaper, Al Ard, in late 1959 under the ownership of Qahwaji.

Qahwaji was arrested and imprisoned in Haifa in 1961. Following his release from prison he was removed from the teaching post and opened a coffee shop in Wadi Nisnas neighborhood of Haifa. He joined the PLO in 1964 when it was established.

Al Ard was preparing to run for the Knesset elections in 1965 under an independent list called Socialist list. However, Qahwaji and other members of Al Ard were either arrested or forced to leave the cities where they were living. Qahwaji settled in Tiberias leaving Haifa. Later he and his wife were arrested and detained more than one year without trial. Then, they were expelled from Israel due to Habib's PLO membership. The Israelis also accused him of being a foreign agent.

Qahwaji family settled in Damascus, Syria, in 1968 after the Six-Day War. He established the Al Ard Institution for Palestinian Studies based in Damascus and translated studies and books on Zionism and Israeli politics from Hebrew into Arabic. He published articles and books. He also wrote poems.

Qahwaji continued to publish Al Ard as a biweekly magazine in Damascus. He was a member of the PLO Research Center in Damascus and a contributor of its journal Shu'un Filastiniyya.

Qahwaji was not a member of the groups within the PLO and served as a member of the PLO executive committee between 1977 and 1980.

== Later years and death ==
Qahwaji went into self-exile in France and died there on 17 March 2023.
