= Islamization of Jerusalem =

Religious transformation of Jerusalem to adopt Islamic influences since the 7th century

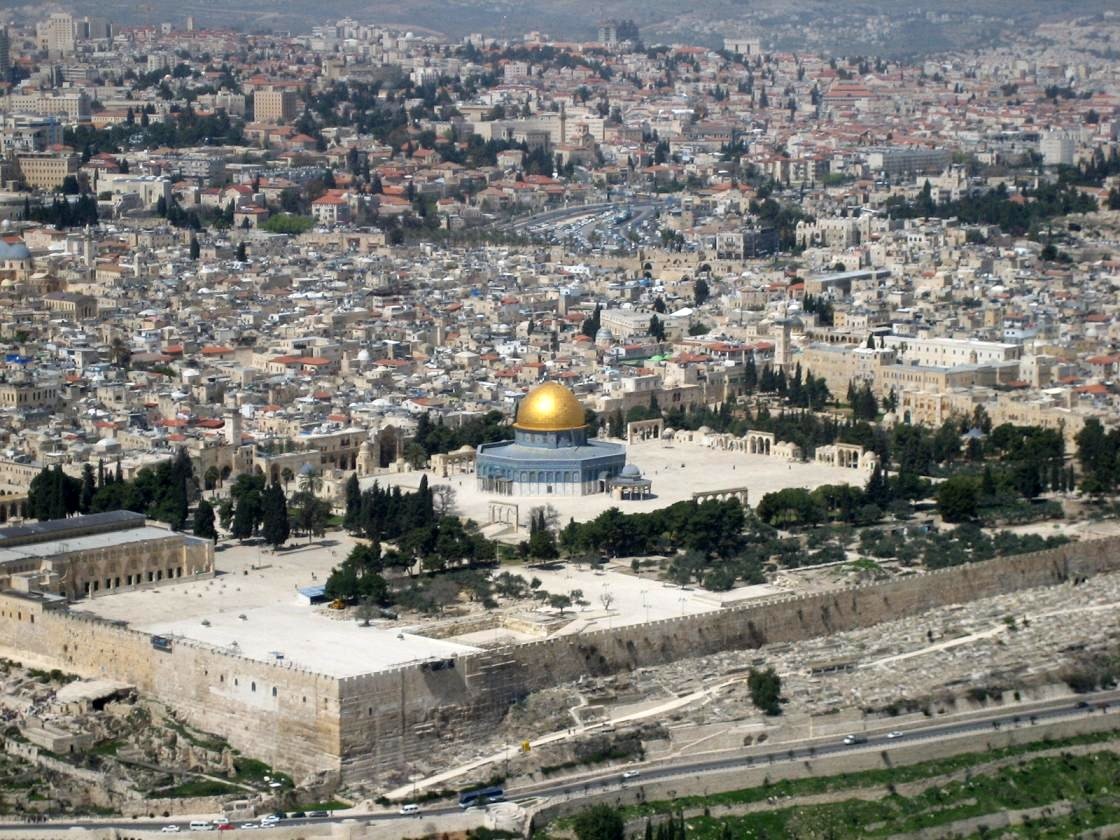
View of Jerusalem with Al-Aqsa in the foreground.

The Islamization of Jerusalem refers to the process through which Jerusalem and its Old City acquired an Islamic character and, eventually, a significant Muslim presence. The foundation for Jerusalem's Islamization was laid by the Muslim conquest of the Levant, and began shortly after the city was besieged and captured in 638 CE by the Rashidun Caliphate under Umar ibn al-Khattab, the second Rashidun caliph. The second wave of Islamization occurred after the fall of the Kingdom of Jerusalem, a Christian state that was established after the First Crusade, at the Battle of Hattin in 1187. The eventual fall of the Crusader states by 1291 led to a period of almost-uninterrupted Muslim rule that lasted for seven centuries, and a dominant Islamic culture was consolidated in the region during the Ayyubid, Mamluk and early Ottoman periods. Beginning in the late Ottoman era, Jerusalem’s demographics turned increasingly multicultural, and regained a Jewish-majority character during the late-19th and early-20th centuries that had not been seen since the Roman period, which largely ended the Jewish presence in the region.

The remodulation was grounded on a foundational narrative in early Islamic texts, themselves drawing on Persian, Jewish and Christian traditions that emphasized the city's cosmological significance within God's creation. At the time of the Muslim conquest of the city, the victors encountered many traditions concerning the Temple Mount: Muslim beliefs regarding David (the miḥrāb Dāwūd in the Quran 38:20–21) and Solomon; shared beliefs that from there, on Mount Moriah (the “mountain” that the Temple Mount sits upon), Adam had been born and died; shared beliefs that Mount Moriah was also where Abraham almost sacrificed one of his sons; and they absorbed the Christian belief that Zechariah, the father of John the Baptist (in the Quran: 'prophet of the Jewish scholars'), raised on the site a mihrab to Mary, the mother of Jesus. These and other such traditions affected the outlay of Islamic buildings. It has also been argued that the central role that Jerusalem assumed in Islamic belief began with Muhammad's instruction to his followers to observe the qibla by facing the direction of Jerusalem during their daily prostrations in prayer. After 13 years (or 16 months, depending on the source), due to both divine guidance and practical matters (souring of relationship with the Jews and/or Muhammad’s frustration with the city and its people) the direction of prayer was changed to Mecca in present-day Saudi Arabia. The Umayyad construction of the Dome of the Rock was interpreted by later hostile Abbasid historians as an attempt to redirect the Hajj from Mecca to Jerusalem.

== First Islamization of Jerusalem under the Caliphates ==
In 638 CE, the Islamic Caliphate extended its dominion to Jerusalem. With the Arab conquest of the region, Jews were allowed back into the city. The majority population of Jerusalem during the time of Arab conquest was Christian. In the aftermath the process of cultural Arabization and Islamization took place, combining immigration to Palestine with the adoption of Arabic language and conversion of a part of the local population to Islam. According to several Muslim scholars, including Mujir ad-Din, al-Suyuti, and al-Muqaddasi, the mosque was reconstructed and expanded by the caliph Abd al-Malik in 690 along with the Dome of the Rock. In planning his magnificent project on the Temple Mount, which in effect would turn the entire complex into the Haram al-Sharif ("the Noble Sanctuary"), Abd al-Malik wanted to replace the slipshod structure described by Arculf with a more sheltered structure enclosing the qibla, a necessary element in his grand scheme. The Jewish background in the construction of the Dome of the Rock is commonly accepted by historians. A number of scholars consider the construction of the Dome as the Muslim desire to rebuild Solomon's Temple or Mihrab Dawud. Grabar and Busse claimed that this was the primary Islamic legitimization for the sanctity of the Dome of the Rock, while the al-mi'raj traditions were transferred to the rock only later. An early Islamic tradition from the converted rabbi Ka'ab al-Ahbar states "Ayrusalaim which means Jerusalem and the Rock which means the Temple. I shall send you my servant Abd al-Malik who will build you and adorn you. I shall surely restore you to Bayt Al Maqdis, its first kingdom and I shall crown it with gold, silver and gems. And I shall surely send you my creatures. And I shall surely invest my throne of glory upon the rock, since I am the sovereign God, and David is the king of the Children of Israel."

=== Under the Rashidun Caliphate ===
The Rashidun caliph Umar ibn al-Khattab signed a treaty with Miaphysite Christian Patriarch Sophronius, assuring him that Jerusalem's Christian holy places and population would be protected under Muslim rule. When led to pray at the Church of the Holy Sepulchre, the holiest site for Christians, the caliph Umar declined to pray within the church in order not to establish a precedent that might be exploited later by some Muslims to convert the church into a mosque. He prayed outside the church, where the Mosque of Umar (Omar) stands to this day, opposite the entrance to the Church of the Holy Sepulchre.

However, some of the most prominent Orientalists and historians of Early Islam, such as Heribert Busse, Moshe Sharon and Oleg Grabar, doubt that caliph Umar ibn al-Khattab had ever visited Jerusalem. The earliest Islamic sources attribute conquest of Jerusalem to a commander by the name Khālid b. Thābit al-Fahmi, whereas Umar appears only in sources written some two centuries after Muslim conquest of the city.

According to the Gaullic bishop Arculf, who lived in Jerusalem from 679 to 688, the Mosque of Umar was a rectangular wooden structure built over ruins which could accommodate 3,000 worshipers.

=== Under the Umayyad and Abbasid Caliphate ===
The Umayyad caliph Abd al-Malik commissioned the construction of the Dome of the Rock in the late 7th century. The 10th-century historian al-Muqaddasi writes that Abd al-Malik built the shrine in order to "compete in grandeur" with Jerusalem's monumental churches. Over the next four hundred years Jerusalem's prominence diminished as Arab powers in the region jockeyed for control.

Jerusalem was called Iliya and later al-Bayt al-Muqaddas which comes from Hebrew Bait ha-Mikdash (בית המקדש). Name Iliya originated from Latin Aelia Capitolina, but Muslims apparently believed that the name was given after the Prophet Elijah.

=== Under the Fatimid Caliphate ===
In 1099, The Fatimid ruler expelled the native Christian population before Jerusalem was conquered by the Crusaders, who massacred most of its Muslim and Jewish inhabitants when they took the solidly defended city by assault, after a period of siege; later the Crusaders created the Kingdom of Jerusalem. By early June 1099 Jerusalem’s population had declined from 70,000 to less than 30,000.

== Second Islamization of Jerusalem ==
=== Under the Ayyubid dynasty ===
In 1187, the city was wrested from the Crusaders by Saladin who permitted Jews and Muslims to return and settle in the city. Under the Ayyubid dynasty of Saladin, a period of huge investment began in the construction of houses, markets, public baths, and pilgrim hostels as well as the establishment of religious endowments. However, for most of the 13th century, Jerusalem declined to the status of a village due to city's fall of strategic value and Ayyubid internecine struggles.

=== Under the Mamluk Sultanate ===
In 1244, Jerusalem was sacked by the Khwarezmian Tartars, who decimated the city's Christian population and drove out the Jews. The Khwarezmian Tartars were driven out by the Ayyubids in 1247. From 1250 to 1517, Jerusalem was ruled by the Mamluks. During this period of time many clashes occurred between the Mamluks on one side and the crusaders and the Mongols on the other side. The area also suffered from many earthquakes and black plague.

== Islamization of Jerusalem under Jordanian rule ==
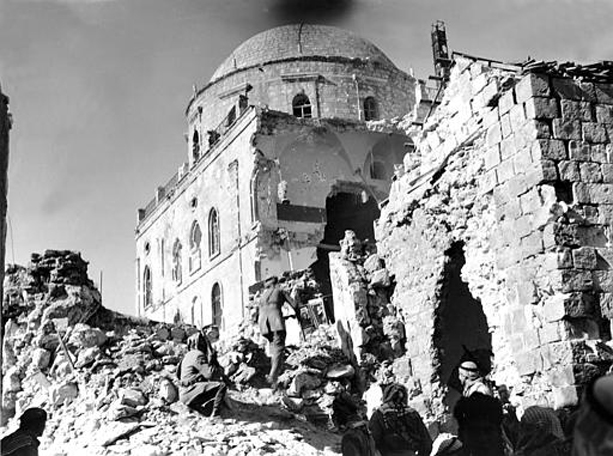
The Tiferet Yisrael Synagogue destruction by Jordanian army in 1948 war.

Between 1948 and 1967, following the expulsion of the Jewish residents during the war, Jordan undertook the systematic destruction of the Jewish Quarter including many synagogues. Under Jordanian rule of East Jerusalem, all Israelis (irrespective of their religion) were forbidden from entering the Old City and other holy sites. Between 40,000 and 50,000 tombstones from ancient Mount of Olives Jewish Cemetery were smashed, ransacked, and desecrated, or used as building material.

Ghada Hashem Talhami states that during its nineteen years of rule, the government of Jordan took actions to accentuate the spiritual Islamic status of Jerusalem. Raphael Israeli, an Israeli historian, argues that the "destruction by the Jordanians of the Jewish Quarter and its many synagogues, including the beautiful ancient synagogue of the Old City known as Khurvat Rabbi Yehuda Hehasid, went a long way to de-Judaize much of the millennia-old Jewish holdings on Jerusalem."

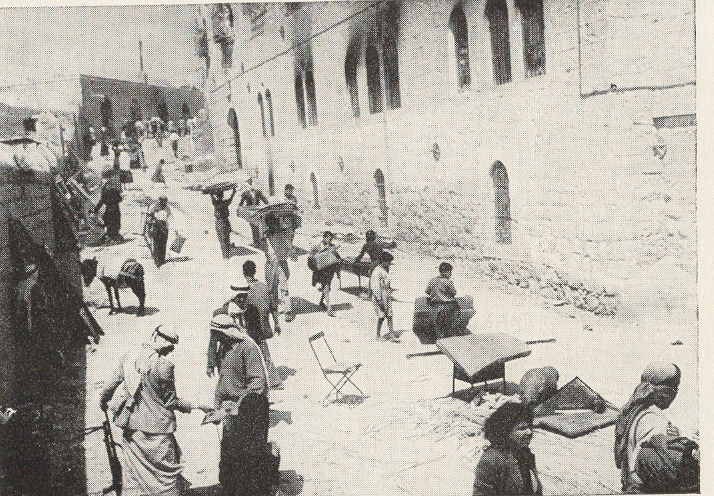
Arab plundering of the Jewish Quarter after its inhabitants' expulsion

While Christian holy sites were protected, and Muslim holy sites were maintained and renovated, Jewish holy sites were damaged and sometimes destroyed. According to Raphael Israeli, 58 synagogues were desecrated or demolished in the Old City, resulting in the de-Judaization of Jerusalem. Oesterreicher, a Christian clergyman and scholar, wrote, “During Jordanian rule, 34 out of the Old City’s 35 synagogues were dynamited.” The Western Wall was transformed into an exclusively Muslim holy site associated with al-Buraq. 38,000 Jewish graves in the ancient Jewish cemetery on the Mount of Olives were systematically destroyed (used as pavement and latrines), and Jews were not allowed to be buried there. This was all in violation of the Israel-Jordan Armistice Agreement Article VIII - 2 "...; free access to the Holy Places and cultural institutions and use of the cemetery on the Mount of Olives;...."

Following the Arab Legion's expulsion of the Jewish residents of the Old City in the 1948 War, Jordan allowed Arab Muslim refugees to settle in the then-vacant Jewish Quarter. Later, after some of these refugees were moved to Shuafat, migrants from Hebron took their place. Abdullah el Tell, a commander of the Arab Legion, remarked:

For the first time in 1,000 years not a single Jew remains in the Jewish Quarter. Not a single building remains intact. This makes the Jews' return here impossible

In his memoirs, Col. Abdullah el Tell outlined the reasons behind his decision to attack the Jewish Quarter:

"The operations of calculated destruction were set in motion. I knew that the Jewish Quarter was densely populated with Jews who caused their fighters a good deal of interference and difficulty... I embarked, therefore, on the shelling of the [Jewish] Quarter with mortars, creating harassment and destruction... Only four days after our entry into Jerusalem the Jewish Quarter had become their graveyard. Death and destruction reigned over it... As the dawn of Friday, May 28, 1948, was about to break, the Jewish Quarter emerged convulsed in a black cloud – a cloud of death and agony."

In 1953, Jordan restricted Christian communities from owning or purchasing land near holy sites, and in 1964, further prohibited churches from buying land in Jerusalem. These were cited, along with new laws impacting Christian educational institutions by the mayor of Jerusalem Teddy Kollek as evidence that Jordan sought to "Islamize" the Christian Quarter of the Old City of Jerusalem.

In order to counter the influence of foreign powers, who had run the Christian schools in Jerusalem autonomously since Ottoman times, the Jordanian government legislated in 1955 to bring all schools under government supervision. They were allowed to use only approved textbooks and teach in Arabic. Schools were required to close on Arab national holidays and Fridays instead of Sundays. Christian holidays were no longer recognised officially, and observation of Sunday as the Christian Sabbath was restricted to Christian civil servants. Students, whether Muslim or Christian, could study only their own religion. The Jerusalem Post described these measures as "a process of Islamization of the Christian Quarter in the Old City.

In general, Christian holy places were treated with respect, although some scholars say they suffered from neglect. During this period, renovations were made to the Church of the Holy Sepulchre, which was in a state of serious disrepair since the British period due to disagreements between the many Christian groups claiming a stake in it. While there was no major interference in the operation and maintenance of Christian holy places, the Jordanian government did not allow Christian institutions to expand. Christian churches were prevented from funding hospitals and other social services in Jerusalem.

In the wake of these restrictions, many Christians left East Jerusalem.

== Islamization of the Temple Mount ==
The Temple Mount was originally an Israelite and subsequently Jewish holy site, as the location of the First and Second Temples. The site was essentially deserted under the Byzantine Empire. Muslims built a mosque on the Temple Mount after conquering the city in 638 CE.

=== Dome of the Rock ===
Monumental constructions made on the Temple Mount, exemplifying what Gideon Avni calls "an outstanding manifestation of Islamic rule over Jerusalem", climaxed at the end of the seventh century, with the construction of the Dome of the Rock in the early 690s when Abd al-Malik was developing his program of Islamization. It was built over the Foundation Stone, the site of the historic Jewish Temple. The al-Aqsa mosque was built at the southern end of the mount in the 8th-century.

Throughout the entire period of the Muslim conquest until the capture of Jerusalem in 1099, various structures were built on the mount, including memorial sites and gates.

From the 13th century onward, after the Muslims had regained control of the city, building projects in Jerusalem and around the Temple Mount sought to further establish the city's Islamic character.

After the conquest of the city by Saladin, non-Muslims were permitted to set foot on the Temple Mount.

=== Al-Aqsa Mosque (Qibli Mosque) ===
It is unknown exactly when the al-Aqsa Mosque was first constructed and who ordered its construction, but it is certain that it was built in the early Umayyad period of rule in Palestine. Architectural historian K. A. C. Creswell, referring to a testimony by Arculf, a Gallic monk, during his pilgrimage to Palestine in 679–82, notes the possibility that the second caliph of the Rashidun Caliphate, Umar ibn al-Khattab, erected a primitive quadrangular building for a capacity of 3,000 worshipers somewhere on the Haram ash-Sharif. However, Arculf visited Palestine during the reign of Mu'awiya I, and it is possible that Mu'awiya ordered the construction, not Umar. This latter claim is explicitly supported by the early Muslim scholar al-Muthahhar bin Tahir.

=== Marwani prayer hall ===
Between 1995 and 2001, the Islamic Waqf carried out extensive construction work in order to build the biggest mosque in the region named Marwani prayer hall, with a capacity of 10,000 worshippers in an area of about 5,000 square meters. During unsupervised construction, the Waqf obliterated many of the antiquities at Solomon's Stables section of Temple Mount. The original Herodian structure was converted into a mosque. The structure stones were stripped of its original surface. At eastern Hulda gate, the Waqf destroyed the original Herodian ornamentation and later plastered them and painted them over. Tens of truck loads of dirt were dumped into Kidron Walley. Thousands of artifacts from the First Temple period until today were later rescued in the operation named Temple Mount Sifting Project. The findings included some 1000 ancient coins, Israelite bullas with ancient Hebrew inscriptions, 10,000-year-old tools like a blade and scraper, as well as Hasmonean, Ptolemaic and Herodian artifacts, ancient stones with signs of Second Temple destruction and other important artifacts.

== See also ==
- Demographic history of Jerusalem
- Islam in Palestine
- Islamization
- Jerusalem in Islam
- Judaization
- Judaization of Jerusalem
- Timeline of Jerusalem
- Demographics of Jerusalem
- Islamization of Palestine
- Religious significance of Jerusalem
- Islamization of the Temple Mount
- Catholic Church in Palestine
- Ba'athist Arabization campaigns in North Iraq
