= Justus Weiner =

American lawyer

Justus Reid Weiner (Hebrew: ג'סטוס וויינר; 1950–2020) was a human rights lawyer and Distinguished Scholar in Residence at the Jerusalem Center for Public Affairs. He was the author of numerous publications. Weiner also lectured widely in various countries, and was a visiting assistant professor at Boston University School of Law. He was a member of the Israel and New York Bar Associations. Previously, he practiced law as an associate in the litigation department of the international law firm White & Case in New York City. Weiner also served as a senior attorney at the Israel Ministry of Justice, specializing in human rights and other facets of public international law.

== Biography ==
Justus Weiner was born in Boston, and graduated from the UC Berkeley law school. In the United States, he practiced law as an associate in the litigation department of the international law firm White & Case before moving to Israel in 1981. After moving to Israel, he "worked for the Israeli Ministry of Justice...investigating claims by human rights groups and media organizations about Israeli conduct toward Palestinians" until 1993.

As a scholar at the Jerusalem Center for Public Affairs, Weiner wrote about legal and religious issues and human rights, particularly in Palestinian society. Weiner was also the principal author of the monograph Referral to Iranian President Ahmadinejad on the Charge of Incitement to Commit Genocide, with Elie Wiesel, Dore Gold and others.

In 1999, Weiner published an article in Commentary in which he accused the Palestinian-American intellectual Edward Said of dishonesty about his origins. These accusations were refuted by Saïd, and appeared to be false according to the Guardian's investigations and The New Republic's investigations. Christopher Hitchens and Alexander Cockburn also refuted them and considered that these false accusations aimed to attack the palestinian narrative about the expulsion of Palestinians in 1948.

Following a 1997 meeting with a Christian pastor who alleged human rights abuses directed at Muslims who converted to Christianity, Weiner became interested in the topic, and subsequently conducted research and published in this area.

Weiner died on September 5, 2020, in Jerusalem after a long illness. "Justus proved that in pursuit of the truth he was prepared to defy the conventional wisdom," Dore Gold, a former Israeli ambassador to the United Nations wrote. "That was a secret source of his strength."

== Weiner's claims about Said's early life ==
In his Commentary article, reprinted on August 26, 1999, on the opinion page of The Wall Street Journal as "The False Prophet of Palestine", Weiner argued that Edward Said's immediate family did not permanently reside in Talbiya or any part of Palestine, but rather in Cairo, and that they did not live in Palestine during the final months of the British Mandate, and were thus not refugees. Weiner said Said's aunt owned a house in Talbiya where Said's family visited. Weiner also stated that Said had no recollection of the Consulate of Yugoslavia located in the aunt's home or that Martin Buber had been evicted from the house in 1942, before the lease expired, when Said was seven years old. In the article, Weiner quoted Said as claiming that Buber had lived in the house after the Said's were expelled.

Weiner also challenged Said's claim that his family fled in response to the use, by Zionist extremists, of truck with a public address system ordering Arabs in Talbieh to leave. Weiner claimed that the sound truck incident occurred after a Jew was shot in the area, but cited local press reports and official dispatches from the British High Commissioner's office to establish that the incident occurred on February 11, 1948, whereas Edward Said claimed his family left in December 1947. According to Weiner, some Arabs left the area temporarily after the February 1948 incident but returned a few days later.

Weiner wrote, "On [Said's] birth certificate, prepared by the ministry of health of the British Mandate, his parents specified their permanent address as Cairo" and that Said's family is mentioned in consecutive annual directories, such as the Egyptian Directory, the Cairo telephone directory, Who's Who in Egypt and the Middle East, but not in similar listings for Jerusalem. Weiner wrote that Said did not attend St. George's Academy in Jerusalem, except briefly, and that his name was not on the school registry.

Weiner did not interview Edward Said. Asked about this, he said that after conducting research that lasted three years, he saw no need to talk to Said about his memories or his childhood: "The evidence became so overwhelming. It was no longer an issue of discrepancies. It was a chasm. There was no point in calling him up and saying, 'You're a liar, you're a fraud.'"

=== Response to Weiner's article ===
In The Nation, Christopher Hitchens wrote that schoolmates and teachers confirmed Said's stay at St. George's, but quotes Said saying in 1992 that he had spent much of his youth in Cairo. Hitchens told Salon magazine that Weiner's article was an "essay of extraordinary spite and mendacity." Weiner replied, "The issue here is credibility, a man with an international reputation who made himself into a poster boy for Palestine." New Republic editor Charles Lane said he considered publishing the article but discussions broke off when Weiner refused to "look at the galley of Said's memoir and take it into account."

In Jewish World Review, Jonathan Tobin offers support for Weiner's claims: "Rather than growing up as a victim in war-torn Palestine, Said lived a privileged life as the son of a prominent businessman in Cairo with an American passport (!)."

In The Guardian, Julian Borger wrote "The Said family, including the 12-year-old Edward, left Jerusalem in 1947 when it became too dangerous to remain in the crossfire between Arabs and Jews over the city's future. Christopher Hitchens, a US-based British journalist and a Said family friend, said: "There's no question. The Saids decided to go because life was made hard for them. It became difficult and dangerous for him to go to school."

Holocaust survivor and Israeli human rights activist Israel Shahak said the argument over how the Said family left Jerusalem did not affect Said's status as a refugee. He said, "This is like saying the Jews who escaped from Germany before the war were not kicked out. The main argument is that they were prevented from returning to their land. This is what it is about." In his 1994 book, the Politics of Dispossession, Edward Said had written, "I was born in Jerusalem in late 1935, and I grew up there and in Egypt and Lebanon; most of my family – dispossessed and displaced from Palestine in 1947 and 1948 – had ended up mostly in Jordan and Lebanon."

In his response to Weiner's article, titled "Defamation, Zionist-style", Said explained that "the family house was in fact a family house in the Arab sense, which meant that our families were one in ownership," and that his name could not be on the school's registry, which was terminated a year before he attended. In his autobiography, Said wrote that his father Wadie's name was not on the title of the house his sister had inherited from their father: "He didn't want his name on the title," because he "didn't like having his name on anything he had to have it on."

Said wrote that the "Zionist movement has resorted to shabbier and shabbier techniques" and alleged that the movement had hired "an obscure Israeli-American lawyer to 'research' the first ten years of my life and 'prove' that even though I was born in Jerusalem I was never really there". He did not state who he alleged hired Weiner or offer any evidence that Weiner had been hired. To an interviewer, Said said, "I was born in Jerusalem; my family is a Jerusalem family. We left Palestine in 1947. We left before most others. It was a fortuitous thing... I never said I was a refugee, but the rest of my family was. My entire extended family was driven out."

== Selected publications ==
- 'My Beautiful Old House' and Other Fabrications by Edward Said" Commentary 1999. Article in paid archive.
- "Hard facts meet soft law: the Israel-PLO Declaration of Principles and the prospects for peace: a response to Katherine W. Meighan" Virginia Journal of International Law, 35(4) Summer 1995
- Peace and Its Discontents: Israeli and Palestinian Intellectuals Who Reject the Current Peace Process. International Law Journal. 29, 501.
- The Palestinian Refugees' "Right to Return" and the peace process. Boston College International and Comparative Law Review. 20, 1.
- Terrorism: Israel's legal responses. Journal of International Law and Commerce. -. 142, 183–207.
- Israel-Palestinian Peace Process: A Critical Analysis of the Cairo Agreement.
- Human rights in the Israeli administered areas during the Intifada, 1987–1990. Madison, University of Wisconsin Law School.
- Business ethics and social responsibility. Jerusalem, Hebrew University of Jerusalem, Rothberg School for Overseas Students.
- The temporary international presence in the city of Hebron ("TIPH"): a unique approach to peacekeeping. Jerusalem, Israel Ministry of Foreign Affairs.
- Peacekeepers: Will they advance any prospective Arab-Israeli peace agreement? Fordham International Law Journal. 34, 1.
- Legal Implications of 'Safe Passage': Reconciling a Viable Palestinian State with Israel's Security Requirements. University of Connecticut Journal of International Law. 22, 233.
- International legal business environment: reader. Jerusalem, The Hebrew University of Jerusalem.
- Justus Reid Weiner (2015). "Israel and the Gaza strip: Why economic sanctions are not collective punishment". Jerusalem Center for Public Affairs.
