= Abnaa el-Balad =

Secular Arab nationalist movement

Abnaa el-Balad (Arabic: ابناء البلد, Sons of the Land or Sons and Daughters of the Country or People of the Homeland Movement) is a secular Arab nationalist movement made up of Palestinians, most of whom are Arab citizens of Israel. The stated goals of the movement are: the return of all Palestinian refugees, an end to Israeli's occupation of territories and the establishment of a democratic, secular Palestinian state.

Abnaa el-Balad membership is open to and includes Jewish citizens of Israel who identify as Palestinian Jews. Since its inception, Abnaa el-Balad has boycotted involvement in the Israeli Knesset, though it does participate in the elections for municipal councils in Arab localities.

== Origins and early political organizing ==
The movement grew out of student organizing among Palestinians in Israel in the late 1960s and early 1970s. One of the co-founders, Mohammed Kiwan, was active in establishing a committee of Arab students at Tel Aviv University between 1967 and 1969. In 1969, he was placed under house arrest in Umm al-Fahm, at which point he began organizing to establish Abnaa el-Balad. In 1971, he returned to Tel Aviv University to complete his law degree and in December 1973, he was elected to the municipal council in Umm al-Fahm, running on Abnaa el-Balad's platform.

The original aim of Abnaa el-Balad was to counteract Israeli attempts to "divide and rule" by capitalizing on old family feuds between the various representatives in the Arab municipal councils in Israel. Abnaa el-Balad emphasized the importance of transforming traditional structures and subordinating existing regional, personal and family differences to the national cause. According to Kiwan, Abnaa el-Balad differed from other Palestinian groups in Israel at the time in that, "The problem for us is ... the question of the Palestinian people." Helena Cobban notes that this position mirrored the "ideological innovation" introduced by PFLP, and was expressed in Kiwan's statement that, "We say that the only true legitimate representative of the Palestinian Arabs is the Palestine Liberation Organization...This is the first principle. Secondly, that all the Palestinian people, everywhere, constitute one identity."

Abnaa el-Balad rejected the idea of working within Israel's parliamentary institution, the Knesset. By forming a network of local groups, they hoped to gain power and empower the community through the use of local municipal councils and popular activities. The movement's programme centered around self-determination for Palestinians inside Israel, explicit support for the PLO, and the eventual establishment of a single democratic state in all of Palestine from the river to the sea.

After winning the December 1973 municipal elections, Kiwan and those in the movement set up a cultural center in Umm al-Fahm with a small library where people could gather to attend public meetings and discuss the Palestinian cause. Local groups affiliated with Abnaa el-Balad emerged in many Arab towns in the 1970s under different names, such as al-Nahda ("The Rebirth") in Taibeh and al-Bayadir ("The Threshing Floor") in Ar'ara. Abnaa el-Balad was one of many groups to help organize the Land Day (Yom Al Ard) demonstration on 30 March 1976 as a way of defending Palestinian rights to the land and defying and challenging Israeli land confiscation policies.

In 1984, a split formed within Abnaa el-Balad, and a breakaway movement called Al Ansar emerged calling for participation in the Israeli elections. However, by 1987, Al Ansar's numbers dwindled and the group fragmented thereafter.

Abnaa el-Balad managed to recover its community support, particularly after the outbreak of the First Intifada in 1987. David McDowall writes that, "The Uprising vindicated Abna al Balad's insistence on the Palestinian identity of Israel's Arabs [...]"

In 1996, Abnaa el-Balad was among a number of political, intellectual and feminist individuals and groups to form part of the National Democratic Alliance (NDA), a coalition that adopted a "Palestinian nationalist" position and called for "a state for all its citizens". Headed by Azmi Bishara, the NDA ran in the 1996 Knesset elections and Bishara gained a seat, serving in Israel's parliament for 11 years, before leaving the country and resigning his post.

On 18 January 1998, Abnaa el-Balad left the National Democratic Alliance.

== More on political positions and affiliations ==
The goals of Abnaa al-Balad today, as described on their website, are:

"to preserve the collective national identity of the Arab Palestinians in Israel, link their struggle to that of the rest of their exiled brethren (especially the refugees right of return) and continue the struggle for the human rights and equality within the state which was imposed on them."

The website also states that though grassroots organizing, Abnaa al-Balad aims to build civil society institutions and raise the national awareness and collective consciousness of the Palestinian masses. This struggle is linked by Abnaa el-Balad to the struggle against imperialism, capitalism and Zionism and their aims in the region.

=== Boycotting of Knesset ===
Since Israeli electoral law forbids organization calling to abolish the Jewish character of the state to take part in Knesset elections, Abnaa al-Balad boycotts what it calls the "Zionist electoral process". Ibrahim Makkawi, a member of the movement and professor of Educational Psychology, explained this in a paper presented at the Third North American Student Conference on the Palestine Solidarity Movement at Rutgers University in October 2003, stating:We refuse to enter the Zionist Knesset, simply because it is (a) in direct contradiction with our national identity as the legitimate owners of the land, (b) it gives legitimacy to the Zionist Entity and support to its myth about democracy, (c) it is a vehicle of cooptation and fragmentation of our leadership and (d) there is virtually nothing that we can achieve through the Knesset with regard to our citizens rights that we cannot do without it." Leftist organizations like Abnaa al-Balad made abstention and the blank vote the center of their political campaigns in the 1999 elections. Although voter turnout increased by just over 30,000, the percentage turnout (70%) was down slightly (reflecting a population increase), and well below predictions of 87%.

In Israel at the Polls 2003, it is noted that Arab voting participation dropped to 62% in the 2003 elections, a drop partially attributed to calls by Abnaa el-Balad to boycott the elections. A May 2003 study by Mada al-Carmel, a Palestinian-Israeli research institute, exploring why Arab voters abstained in the 2003 Israeli elections determined that 43.4% of non-voters abstained from voting for political reasons, and that this group represented some 14% of registered voters. The majority of these (some 11.2% of registered voters) were protesting the political situation and Israeli policies in the occupied territories.

In Elections in Israel – 2003 where the results of the Mada al-Carmel study were analyzed, it is noted that only 3.8% of registered voters chose not to vote "as a conscious political act," out of the belief that "[...] the Jewish state and its parliamentary institution are not legitimate and that participation of Arab citizens in the elections turns them into a tool that Israel uses to win legitimacy in their eyes and in the eyes of the world. Those who advocate a boycott on these grounds believe that it is not possible to achieve political gains through elections in Israel's present political structure, and certainly not at the price of granting legitimacy to the Jewish state."The authors go on to describe the "extra-parliamentary" Abnaa al-Balad as the most prominent representative of this school of thought.

Abnaa el-Balad called for Palestinian citizens of Israel to boycott the 2006 Knesset elections through its affiliated organization, The Popular Committee for Boycotting the Knesset Elections (Arabic: اللجنة الشعبية لمقاطعة انتخابات الكنيس).

=== Opposing Jewish immigration ===
Abnaa al-Balad was the only Palestinian organization based in Israel to move from passive to active opposition to immigration of Jews to Israel from the Former Soviet Union (FSU) in the late 1980s and early 1990s. Raja Eghbaria explained the reasoning behind the group's opposition as follows:"Going back in history, Jewish immigration to Palestine has always been at the expense of the Palestinian people. It resulted in the expulsion of Palestinians from their homeland. Adding one million Jews to Israel [the Soviet immigration] forms an actual danger to the very fact of our existence. Transfer of the remaining Palestinians comes closer to realization than it had been before."

The movement circulated pamphlets and petitions opposing Russian immigration. A 3 August 1990 pamphlet, entitled "What are We Waiting For? Immigrants are Penetrating our Doors and Threatening Our Lands" called for joint action with "oppressed Jews" (that is, Mizrahim) to halt the immigration and for Arabs to participate in a demonstration in Jerusalem and the Negev on 5 August.

According to Majid Al Haj, the opposition articulated by Abnaa el-Balad "[...] never crossed the line into active resistance." It remained "[...] a limited attempt to mobilize the Arab public in Israel to speak openly against immigration from the FSU."

=== Participation in local and international movements and conferences ===
In 1992 and 1993, the Abnaa el-Balad Movement and the NGO of the same name participated in The Ninth and Tenth United Nations International NGO Meetings on the Question of Palestine which were held under the auspices of the Committee on the Exercise of the Inalienable Rights of the Palestinian People in Geneva and Vienna, respectively.

Abnaa al-Balad was one of a number of Arab civil society organizations in Israel to present at the "I Will Not Serve" national conference which discussed the reasons why Arab citizens of Israel should resist mandatory civic service.

== Arrests of members ==
In a study of Palestinian NGOs in Israel (2005), Shany Payes writes that the state response to the challenge posed by Palestinian activists like Abnaa el-Balad has been to adopt a policy of 'active exclusion'; that is, "denying the Palestinian leadership in Israel access to the avenues of publicity or decision-making." According to Payes, state authorities in Israel used "security considerations" to justify restrictions on organizing and publishing by groups considered a "security risk".

Several of Abnaa el-Balad's leaders have been arrested or otherwise detained. In the early 1980s, Faraj Khnayfus, a leader for Abnaa el-Balad in Shafa'Amr of Druze background, spent three years in jail for refusing to serve in the IDF.

During the 80s and especially at the time of the First Intifada (1987–1990), Many of the movement's members were detained, accused in different accusations most of them graffitty, raising Palestinian flags, 'rioting' (during demonstrations) and property destruction, and hundreds of members were imprisoned to periods between 3 months and 6 years.

At the beginning of the Second Intifada, central committee member, Yoav Bar, was arrested on 2 October 2000 during "an initially peaceful protest in Haifa". According to Amnesty International, Bar "[...] was dragged by the legs for more than 50 meters by two police officers with his back sliding along the street, while other police officers beat him with batons. He was beaten again in a police car. He told the police that he thought his hand was broken; the police refused to give him any medical treatment." Released at midnight the same day, "Yoav Bar's left hand was broken in three places. Two of his ribs were broken, and two of his front teeth were broken. His back was also injured as a result of being dragged along the street."

In 2003, in response to the campaign of persecuation against the leadership of the Islamic Movement, the 'Committee for the Defense of Freedoms' was formed by the Follow-Up Committee in purpose of "confronting political persecution and harassment against Palestinian political movements and attacks against Palestinian organizations in Israel, which includes organizations such as the Islamic Movement, the Abnaa al-Balad Movement, and support groups of prisoners as "Ansar al-Sajeen"."

=== 2004 arrests ===
On 7 February 2004, Mohammad Kana'neh, the General Secretary the movement and a board member for the NGO Ittijah, was arrested in his home in Arrabe at four in the morning. According to the legal advocacy group, Adalah, during the search of his home, Israeli police beat his son, wife, and mother. Also arrested that day was Mohammed's brother, Hussam Kana'neh (also known as Majed), a central committee member of Abnaa el-Balad. Initially, no reasons were provided for their arrest, nor were they allowed contact to their lawyer, and a court hearing the night of their arrest granted the police the right to detain them for 10 days.

Also arrested that same day was Sahar Abdo, a secretary for The New Generation magazine published by the Balad Association (the NGO of the same name as the movement). Yoav Bar was removed from his home at four in the morning by police and taken to the movement's club in the city. During a search of the premises, "[...] security personnel destroyed the furniture, ripped pictures from the walls, walked on photos of the victims of the Israeli occupation, threw trash, cleaning chemicals, oil, and grease on piles of books and magazines that had been thrown on the floor, and wrote curses and obscenities on the walls. During this time, Yoav Bar was threatened and cursed; one officer told him, 'If it were up to me, I would shoot you in the head.'"

Youssef Abu Ali, an activist with Abnaa al-Balad in Sakhnin, was arrested a few days after the arrests of the Kana'neh brothers, Bar and Abdo, on 12 February 2004 at 2:30 in the morning. His detention was extended by seven days before the Acre court and he was denied the right to see his attorney.

By the end of February, 2004, Sahar Abdo, and Youssef Abu Ali had been released after 24 days of detention without the laying of any charges. All were subjected to abusive interrogation techniques and had been denied access to a lawyer and their families for 18 to 21 days. According to Adalah, the interrogation methods used by the General Security Services (GSS) included tying the activists to their chairs, sleep deprivation, the refusal to provide essential medical treatment when needed, preventing them from bathing for long periods of time, and providing them with "inaccurate, misleading information" about their basic legal rights. Adalah submitted that, "These GSS actions violated the political activists' rights to due process, life, privacy, and dignity."

On 4 March 2004, Mohamad Kana'neh was indicted on three counts of "contact with a foreign agent": he was accused of meeting Dr. George Habash, the founder of the PFLP in Jordan, Ibrahim 'Ajweh "Abu – Yaffa", a Fatah member and anti-globalization/anti-normalization activist from Jordan, and visiting Ahmad Sa'adat, the general secretary of the PFLP in Jericho prison. His brother Hussam Kana'neh was indicted for transferring paramedical equipment from Ibrahim 'Ajweh to Jenin. According to the prosecution inside this equipment were hidden instructions for making explosives. Even according to the state attorney, Hussam didn't know about the 'hidden instructions' but the prosecution claimed that he should have "known that passing those electric devices will harm Israel's security."

Before the indictment, the prosecution held a big press conference, linking Mohammad and Hussam Kana'neh to Hezbollah. This accusation was never presented in court.

On October 10, 2004, Mohamad Kana'aneh accepted a plea bargain and pleaded guilty to one count of "contact with a foreign agent" – Ibrahim 'Ajweh. Although the prosecution agreed that all the contacts between the two were public as part of Mohamad Kana'neh's political activity, the state requested a 6 years sentence. The Haifa District Court sentenced him to 30 months of imprisonment and 2 years suspended incarceration.

At February 2005, Hussam Kana'neh accepted a plea bargain and pleaded guilty to "Supplying services to an unlawful association", "Conspiracy to assist the enemy at time of war", and "contact with a foreign agent". He was sentenced to 10 1/2 years of imprisonment. Husam's friends and supporters – most of them Jewish colleagues who knew him from his work as a psychologist in the health services of the impoverished neighborhoods in Jaffa – followed the trial and established a special website in his support

Abnaa el-Balad strongly condemned the court decisions and stated: "We consider the Court sentence a continuation of the repression and persecutions against our movement and against all the Arab masses and their leadership inside the 1948 territories. Abnaa el-Balad will check with our lawyers the legal implications of this case as well as the possibility of appealing to such an unjust verdict. In November 2005, an Israeli appeals court extended Mohammad Kana'neh's sentence by two years to four and a half years imprisonment.
