= Land Day =

Palestinian day of commemoration

- Observed by: Palestinians in Israel and the occupied Palestinian territories
- Date: March 30
- Next time: March 30, 2027
- Frequency: Annual

Land Day (Arabic: يَوْم اَلْأَرْض, romanized: Yawm al-ʾArḍ; Hebrew: יוֹם הַאֲדָמָה, romanized: Yom HaAdama), recurring on March 30, is a day of commemoration for Palestinians, both Arab citizens of Israel and those in the Israeli-occupied territories of the events of that date in 1976 in Israel.

In 1976, the Israeli government announced a plan to confiscate some 20,000 dunams (20 km^{2}; 7.7 sq mi) of land for state purposes between the Arab villages of Sakhnin and Arraba, of which 6,300 dunams (6.3 km^{2}; 2.4 sq mi) was Arab-owned. It formed part of the Israeli government's strategy aimed at the Judaization of the Galilee. In response, Arab towns declared a general strike and marches were organized from the Galilee to the Negev. The Israeli military and police killed six unarmed Arab demonstrators, half of whom were women; injured one hundred more; and arrested hundreds of others.

Scholarship on the Israeli–Palestinian conflict recognizes Land Day as a pivotal event in the struggle over land and in the relationship of Arab citizens to the Israeli state and body politic. It is significant in that it was the first time since 1948 that Arabs in Israel organized a response to Israeli policies as a Palestinian national collective. An important annual day of commemoration in the Palestinian national political calendar ever since, it is marked not only by Arab citizens of Israel, but also by Palestinians all over the world.

== Background ==
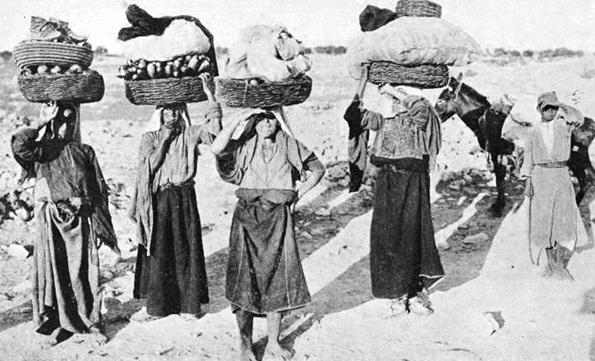
Arab peasant women (fellahat) from Battir, a village between Jerusalem and Bethlehem taking produce to market (1910)

The Arabs of Mandatory Palestine were a largely agrarian people, roughly three quarters of whom made their living off the land before the establishment of the Israeli state. After the 1948 Palestinian expulsion and flight during the 1948 Palestine war, land continued to play an important role in the lives of the 156,000 Palestinian Arabs who remained inside what became the state of Israel, serving as the source of communal identity, honor, and purpose.

The Israeli government adopted in 1950 the Law of Return to facilitate Jewish immigration to Israel and the absorption of Jewish refugees. Israel's Absentees' Property Law of March 1950 transferred the property rights of absentee owners to a government-appointed Custodian of Absentee Property. It was also used to confiscate the lands of Arab citizens of Israel who "are present inside the state, yet classified in law as 'absent'." The number of "present-absentees" or internally displaced Palestinians from among the 1.2 million Arab citizens of Israel is estimated (in 2001) to be 200,000, or almost 17% of the total Palestinian Arab population in Israel. Salman Abu-Sitta estimates that between 1948 and 2003 more than 1,000 square kilometers (390 sq mi) of land was expropriated from Arab citizens of Israel (present-absentees and otherwise).

According to Oren Yiftachel, public protest against state policies and practices from among the Arabs in Israel was rare prior to the mid-1970s, owing to a combination of factors including military rule over their localities, poverty, isolation, fragmentation, and their peripheral position in the new Israeli state. Those protests that did take place against land expropriations and the restrictions Arab citizens were subject to under military rule (1948–1966) are described by Shany Payes as "sporadic" and "limited", due to restrictions on rights to freedom of movement, expression and assembly characteristic of that period. While the political movement Al-Ard ("The Land") was active for about a decade, it was declared illegal in 1964, and the most notable antigovernment occasions otherwise were the May Day protests staged annually by the Communist party.

=== Catalyzing events ===
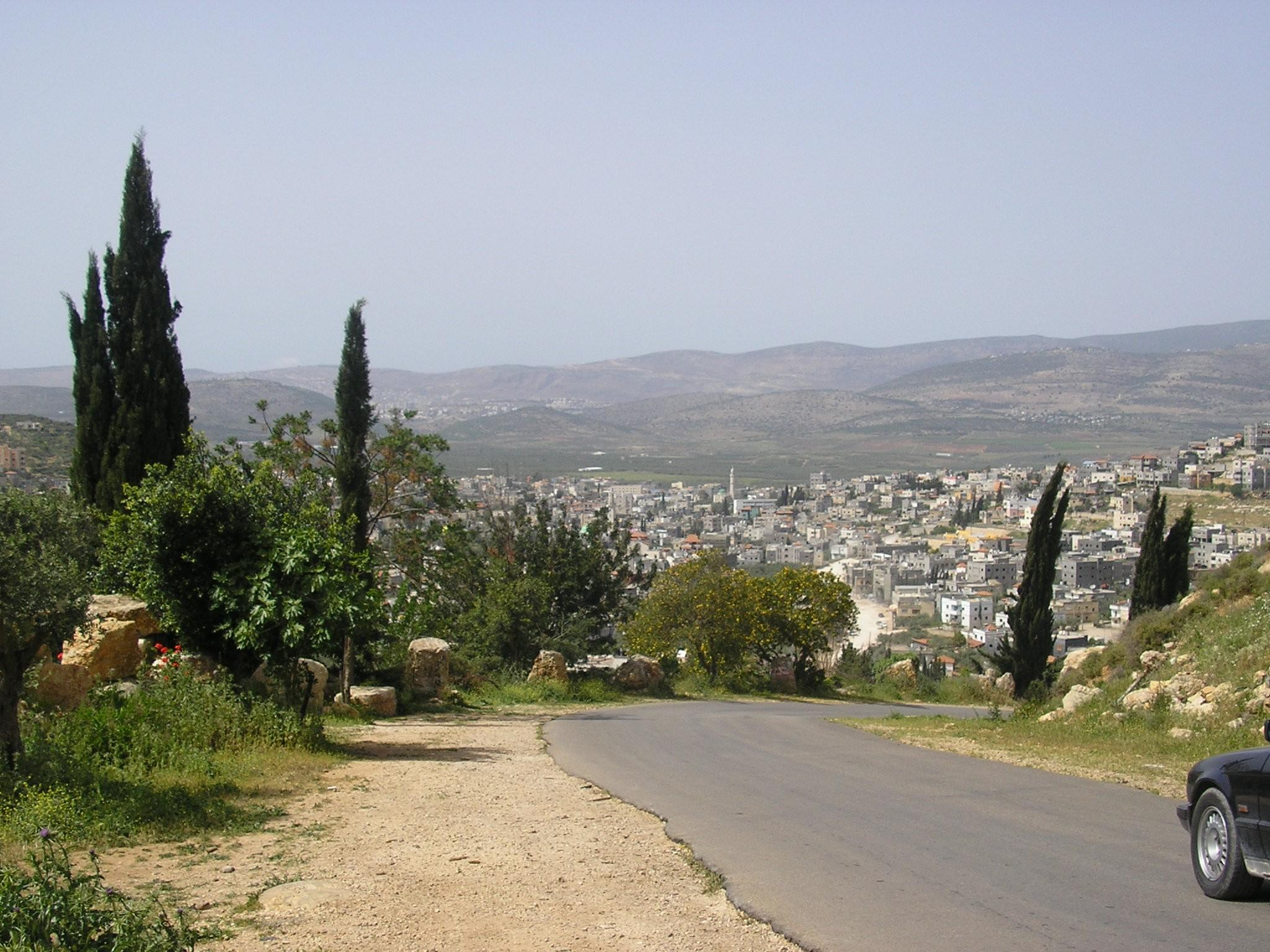
A view of Arraba from the road leading to its northern limit

The government of Israel declared its intention to expropriate lands in the Galilee for official use, affecting some 20,000 dunams of land between the Arab villages of Sakhnin and Arraba, of which 6,300 dunams was Arab-owned. On March 11, 1976, the government published the expropriation plan.

Yiftachel writes that the land confiscations and expansion of Jewish settlements in the northern Galilee formed part of the government's continuing strategy aimed at the Judaization of the Galilee which itself constituted both a response to and catalyst for "Palestinian resistance", culminating in the events of Land Day. According to Nayef Hawatmeh, leader of the Democratic Front for the Liberation of Palestine (DFLP), the land was to be used to construct "[...] eight Jewish industrial villages, in implementation of the so-called Galilee Development Plan of 1975. In hailing this plan, the Ministry of Agriculture openly declared that its primary purpose was to alter the demographic nature of Galilee in order to create a Jewish majority in the area." Orly Helpern of The Jerusalem Post writes that the lands were confiscated by the government for security purposes, and that they were subsequently used to build a military training camp, as well as new Jewish settlements.

Yifat Holzman-Gazit places the 1976 announcement within the framework of a larger plan devised in 1975. Some 1900 dunams of privately owned Arab land were to be expropriated to expand the Jewish town of Carmiel. Additionally, the plan envisaged the establishment between 1977 and 1981 of 50 new Jewish settlements known as mitzpim (singular: mitzpe) which would consist of fewer than 20 families each. The plan called for these to be located between clusters of Arab villages in the central Galilee affecting some 20,000 dunams (30% of which were to be expropriated from Arabs, 15% from Jews, with the remainder constituting state-owned land). David McDowall identifies the resumption of land seizures in the Galilee and the acceleration of land expropriations in the West Bank in the mid-1970s as the immediate catalyst for both the Land Day demonstration and similar demonstrations that were taking place contemporaneously in the West Bank. He writes: "Nothing served to bring the two Palestinian communities together politically more than the question of land."

=== Protest of 1976 ===
The government decision to confiscate the land was accompanied by the declaration of a curfew to be imposed on the villages of Sakhnin, Arraba, Deir Hanna, Tur'an, Tamra, and Kabul, effective from 5 p.m. on March 29, 1976. Local Arab leaders from the Rakah party, such as Tawfiq Ziad, who also served as the mayor of Nazareth, responded by calling for a day of general strikes and protests against the confiscation of lands to be held on March 30. On March 18 the heads of the local Arab councils, members of the Labour Party, met in Shefa-'Amr and voted against supporting the day of action. When news of the decision became public a demonstration developed outside the municipal buildings and was dispersed with tear gas. The government declared all demonstrations illegal and threatened to fire 'agitators', such as schoolteachers who encouraged their students to participate, from their jobs. The threats were not effective, however, and many teachers led their students out of the classrooms to join the general strike and marches that took place throughout the Arab towns in Israel, from the Galilee in the north to the Negev in south. Solidarity strikes were also held almost simultaneously in the West Bank, Gaza Strip, and in most of the Palestinian refugee camps in Lebanon.

The events of the day were unprecedented. According to the International Jewish Peace Union, "To preempt incidents inside Israel on Land Day, about 4,000 policemen, including a helicopter-borne tactical unit and army units, were deployed in the Galilee [...]" During the protests, four unarmed demonstrators were shot dead by the Israel Defense Forces (IDF) and two more by police. Nahla Abdo and Ronit Lentin write that three of the dead were women, and that, "the army was allowed to drive armoured vehicles and tanks along the unpaved roads of various villages of the Galilee." About 100 Arabs were wounded and hundreds of others were arrested.

The New York Times reported that the killings were carried out by police during "riots in the Galilee region to protest over Israeli expropriation of Arab land." In Arutz Sheva, Ezra HaLevi writes that the riots started the night before, "with Israeli-Arabs throwing rocks and firebombs at police and soldiers. The riots continued the next day and intensified, resulting in many wounded members of Israeli security forces and the death of the six Arab rioters." Yosef Goell, writing in The Jerusalem Post, says that, "What actually set off the rioting that led to the deaths was a wild attack by hundreds of inflamed young Arabs on an unsuspecting IDF convoy driving on the road by the villages of Sakhnin, Arrabe and Deir Hanna. There was no prior provocation on the part of that IDF convoy, unless one insists on seeing a provocation in the very presence of an Israeli army unit in the heart of Israeli Galilee."

A 2003 Israeli government document notes that, "Arab public figures tried to limit the protests, but lost control over the events. The protestors burnt tires, blocked roads, and threw rocks and molotov cocktails." Placing the six fatalities within the context of "severe clashes" between protestors and security forces, it is also noted that there were many injuries on both sides. Baruch Kimmerling and Joel S. Migdal write that Land Day differed from the Kafr Qasim massacre in that the Palestinians in Israel exhibited a "[...] daring confidence and political awareness totally lacking in 1956; this time Arab citizens were not passive and submissive. Instead they initiated and coordinated political activity at the national level, responding to police brutality with their own violence."

== Impact ==
During the Land Day events, a new sense of national pride, together with anger toward the state and police and sorrow over the dead protesters, developed among the Arab community in Israel. A split erupted between the Arab political parties of Rakah and Abnaa al-Balad. Committed to a two-state solution to the Israeli–Palestinian conflict, Rakah held major reservations about the involvement of Palestinians from the West Bank. Conversely, Abnaa al-Balad's commitment to the establishment a single democratic Palestine saw the issues of land, equality, the refugees and the occupation as "a comprehensive, integral and indivisible whole." While Rakah remained committed to a two-state solution, it charted a delicate balance, expressing a Palestinian identity more clearly so as to be more in tune with community sentiment. For example, shortly after Land Day, Tawfiq Ziad declared that, "From now on there will be no communities and religious groups but only a single Arab minority, part of the Palestinian nation."

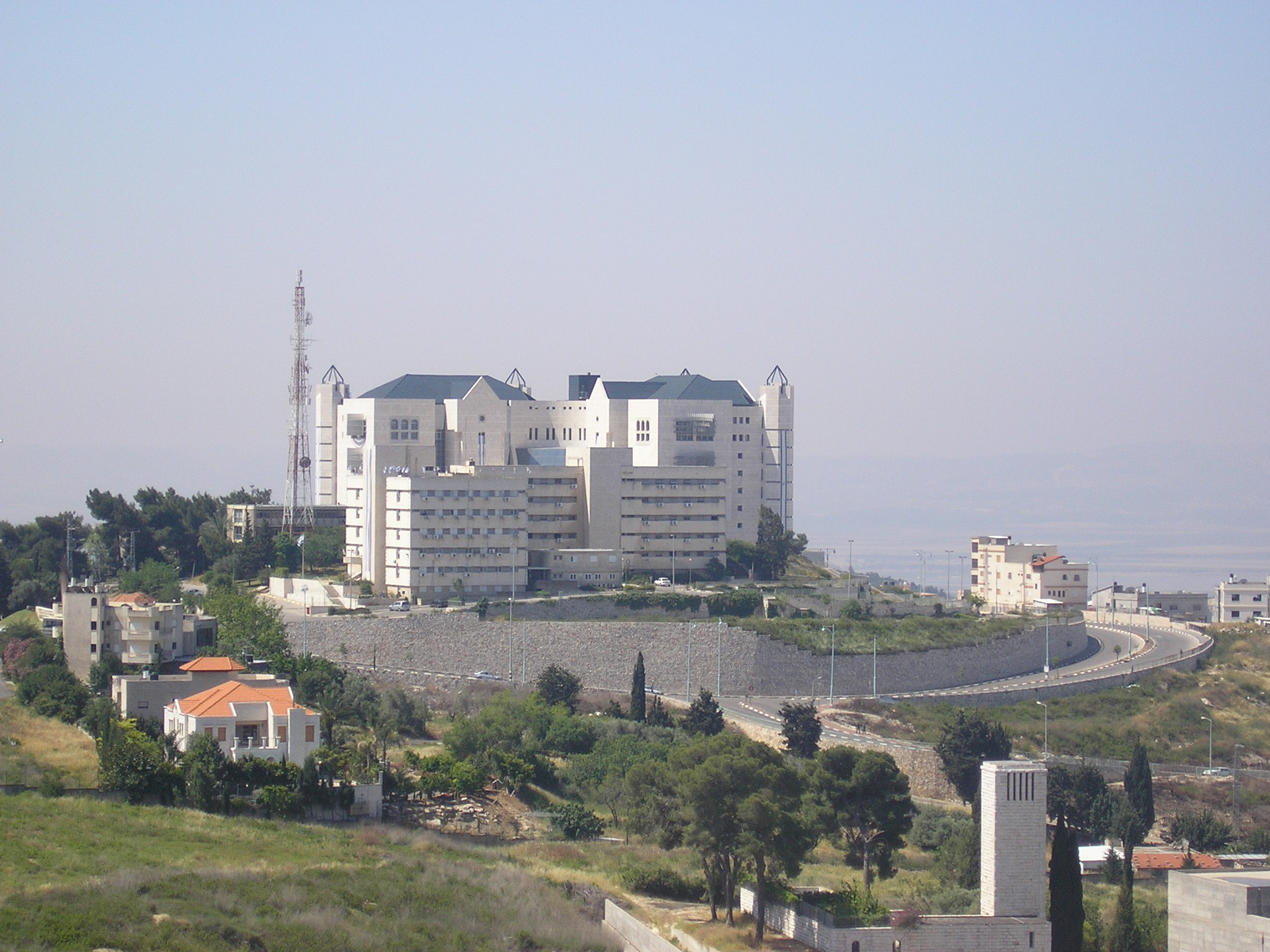
Government compound named after Yitzhak Rabin in Upper Nazareth

Land Day also resulted in the Arabs gaining a presence in Israeli politics in that they could no longer be ignored. Arab civil society in Israel began coordinating with one another more and protests against government policies became more frequent with a focus on three major issues: land and planning policies, socioeconomic conditions, and Palestinian national rights.

The protest did little to stop the 1975 land expropriation plan. The number of mitzpim established reached 26 in 1981 and 52 in 1988. These mitzpim and the "development towns" of Upper Nazareth, Ma'alot, Migdal Ha'emeq and Carmiel significantly altered the demographic composition of the Galilee. While Arabs had comprised 92% of the population of the Galilee in the years following Israel's establishment, by 1994, that number was reduced to 72% out of a regional population of 680,000, with Jews making up the remaining 28%. Large-scale expropriations of land in the Galilee have generally been avoided by Israeli governments since the 1980s.

== Studies of Israeli media coverage ==
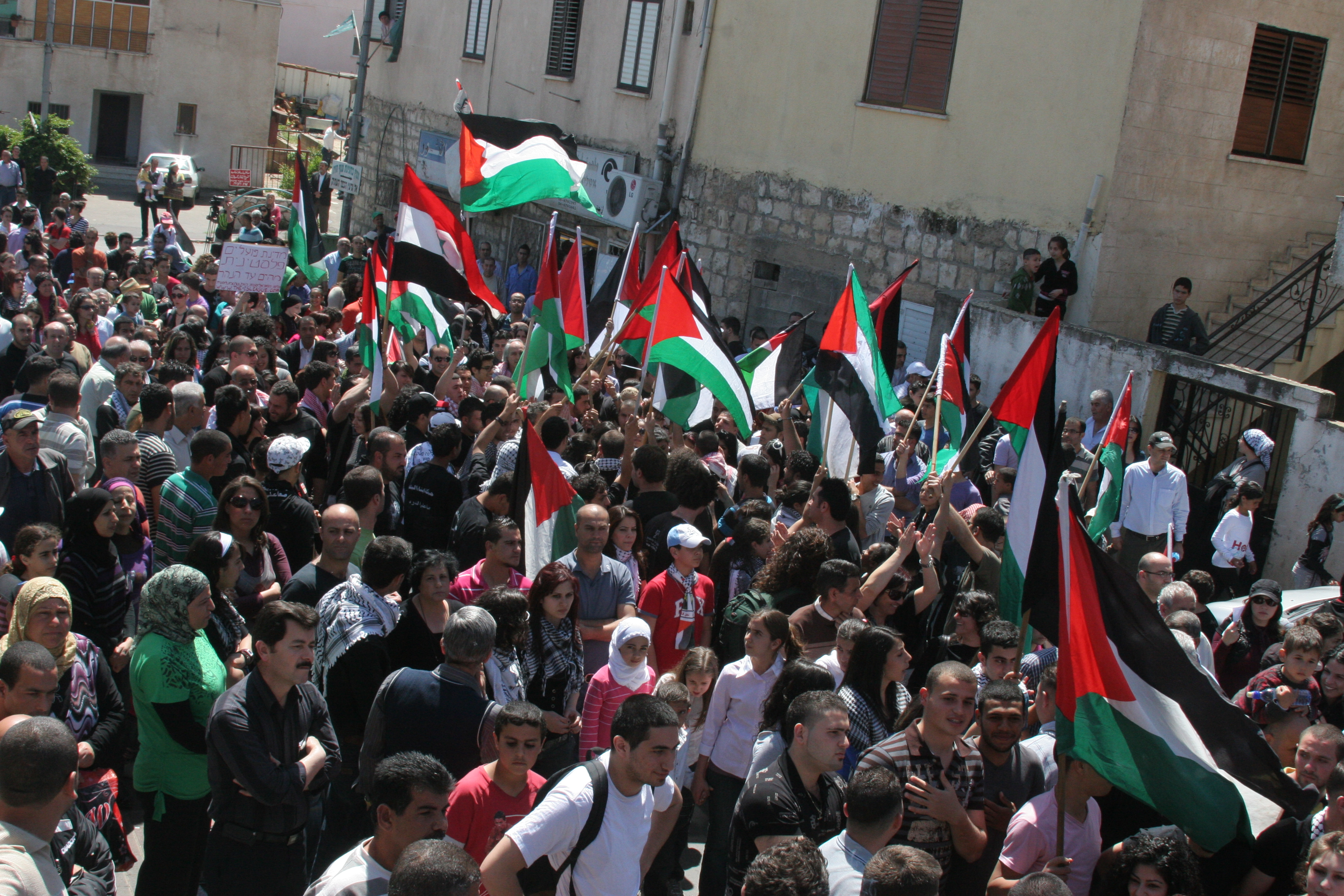
Israeli Arabs at a Land Day rally in Sakhnin, 30 March 2010

Israeli media coverage of Land Day has been analyzed and critiqued by Israeli academics. Alina Koren's 1994 study of seven major Israeli newspapers found that coverage of the preparations and outcome of the day was extensive in March–April 1976, with reports relying almost entirely on statements from official Israeli information sources such as ministers, advisers or "experts on Arabs." Hardly any space was devoted to the voices of Arab organizers and participants. All of the newspapers examined, whatever their ideological differences, minimized the causes, emphasizing instead two main themes: portraying the demonstrations as the work of a marginal and unrepresentative minority and describing them as a potential threat to state security and law and order. Daniel Bar-Tal and Yona Teichman write: "Of special importance is the finding that all the newspapers delegitimized the participants, as communists, nationalists, extremists, agitators, inciters, enemies or violent people."

Bar-Tal and Teichman also cite a 2000 study by professors Gadi Wolfsfeld, Eli Avraham and Issam Aburaiya that analyzed coverage by Haaretz and Yediot Aharonot of the annual commemorations between 1977 and 1997 and found that reports prior to the event each year also relied heavily on news items from the police and military sources. The focus was on security preparations, with reports on Arabs limited to the agitation and incitement put forward by their leadership. Information on the reasons for the protest was provided in between 6% and 7% of the stories published. Almost all of the reporters were Jewish, and only Haaretz had a reporter specially assigned to cover the Arab population. The event was framed within the context of the Arab–Israeli conflict with Arab demonstrators defined as enemies, rather than citizens making demands of their government. A March 22, 1997 editorial in Yediot Ahronoth for example read: "The right to protest does not include the right to run riot, to close roads, to throw stones at passing vehicles. ... Again, it has to be made clear to Israeli Arabs that most of their Israeliness is based on their loyalty that they owe to their country and its laws. If they don't want these laws no one is preventing them from leaving."

== Legacy ==
For Palestinians, Land Day has since become a day of commemoration and tribute to those who have fallen in the struggle to hold onto their land and identity. Often serving as a day for the expression of political discontent for Arab citizens of Israel, particularly surrounding issues of equal land and citizenship rights, in 1988, they declared that Land Day should serve as "a Palestinian-Israeli civil national day of commemoration and a day of identification with Palestinians of the West Bank and Gaza, to be marked by yearly demonstrations and general strikes."

Not only did Land Day work to forge political solidarity among Arab citizens of Israel, but it also worked "[...] in cementing the acceptance of the "1948 Arabs" back into the larger Palestinian world and into the heart of mainstream Palestinian nationalism." The day is commemorated annually by Palestinians in the West Bank, Gaza Strip, East Jerusalem, and further afield in refugee camps and among the Palestinian diaspora worldwide. In 2007, the Press Center of the Palestinian National Authority described it "...as a remarkable day in the history of the Palestinian people's struggle, as the Palestinians in such a particular day embrace the land of their ancestors, their identity and their existence." However, in recent years, some observers have claimed that the Arab population inside Israel seems less enthusiastic about the protests, despite the organizers' efforts to promote hype. According to the Jerusalem Post, this is a sign of growing reconciliation on the grass-roots level.

=== Annual commemoration and protests ===
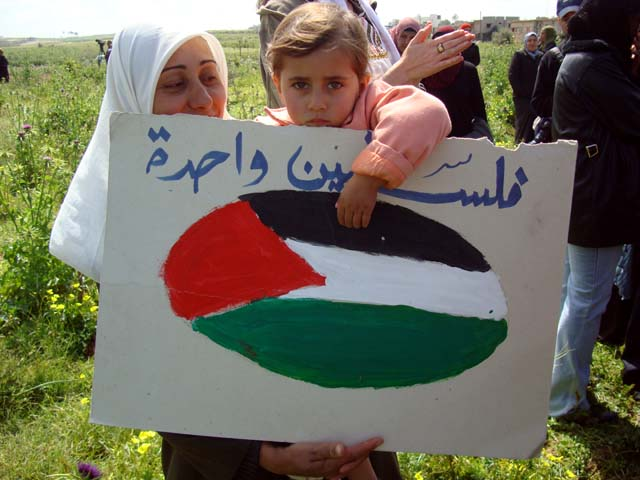
A Palestinian woman and child at a Land Day rally in Beit Hanoun in the Gaza Strip

An Israeli judiciary study reports that the general strike and marches carried out in Israel during the annual commemoration of 2000 generally proceeded peacefully, with the exception of the protest in Sakhnin. There, hundreds of youth gathered and moved towards the Israeli military base adjacent to the village to the west. Uprooting the fences, they penetrated the base, and waved the Palestinian flag inside. Arab public figures who were there to make speeches attempted to subdue them, but were met with hostility and even beatings. Border police forces who arrived to reinforce the base were stoned by the protestors, some of whom were wearing masks and set fires in the woods. Tear gas and rubber bullets were used to push the protestors back towards the main road where clashes continued. Muhammad Zidan, Head of the Arab Higher Followup Committee, was among those wounded in the clashes, and a 72-year-old woman from Sakhnin was reported to have died in the hospital after injuries sustained from tear gas inhalation. A 2006 report in The Jerusalem Post states that in annual commemorations of the day by Arab citizens today, Israeli security forces are on alert but do not interfere in the protests.

During the Second Intifada in 2001, on the 25th anniversary of Land Day, which fell on a Friday, the weekly "Day of Rage", Palestinians were called upon to demonstrate. Tens of thousands of Arab citizens, joined by some Jews, demonstrated in peaceful marches inside Israel, carrying Palestinian flags. During demonstrations in the West Bank, four Palestinians were killed and 36 wounded in Nablus when Israeli forces used live ammunition against protesters throwing stones and molotov cocktails. In Ramallah, one Palestinian was shot dead and 11 others injured when soldiers clashed with 2,000 demonstrators who burned pictures of Ariel Sharon and waved Iraqi and Palestinian flags; Palestinian gunmen also joined the clashes after an hour, drawing heavy Israeli fire from tank-mounted machine guns. There were also demonstrations in the Gaza Strip and in the Palestinian refugee camp of Ain al-Hilweh in Lebanon.

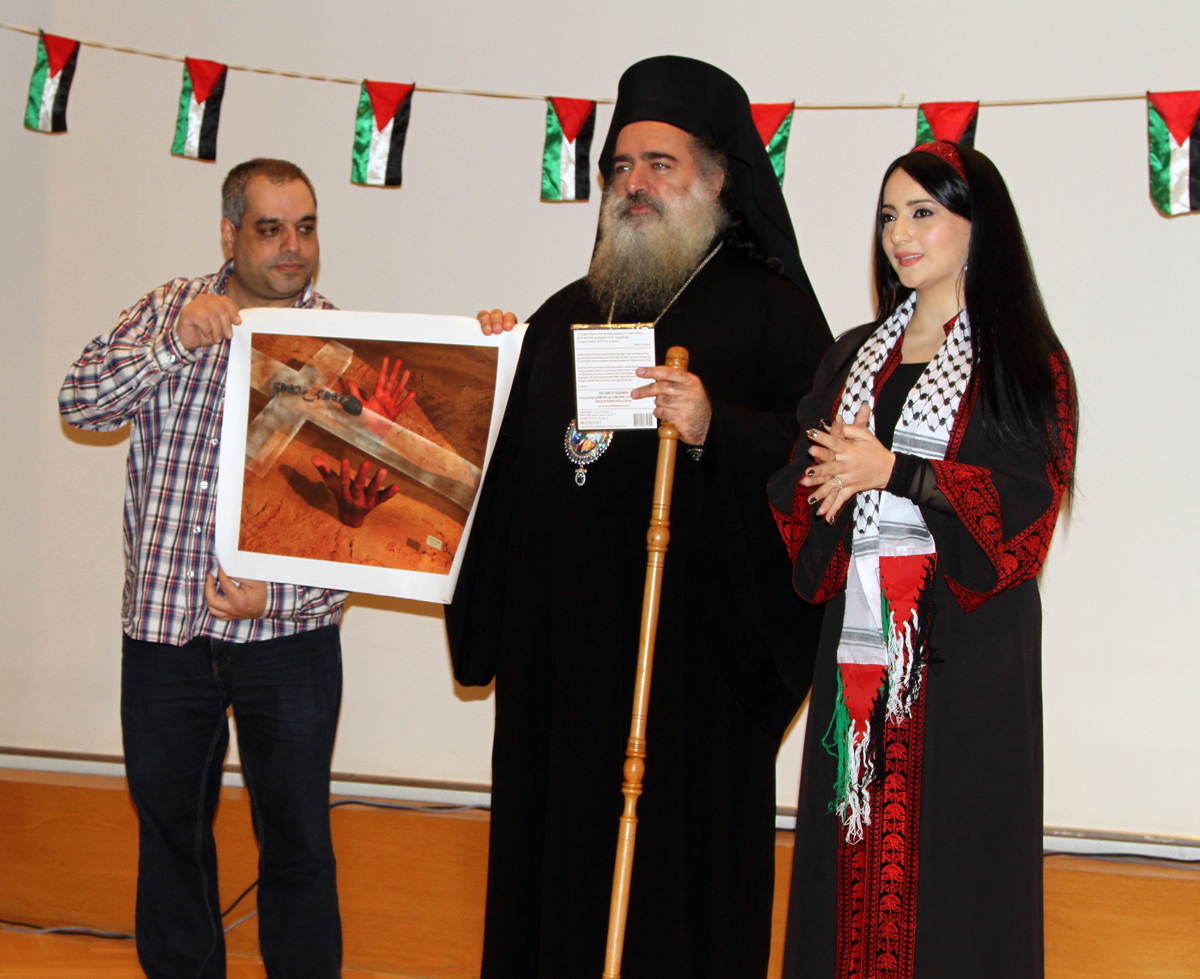
The Palestinian filmmaker and artist Hisham Zreiq honors the Archbishop of Sebastia Theodosios (Atallah Hanna) and the Palestinian singer Manal Mousa by giving each of them one of his artworks in The Palestinian Land Day celebration in Dortmund Germany

In the Land Day demonstrations of 2002, Arab citizens of Israel expressed their solidarity with Palestinians in the West Bank and Gaza, speaking out against the "Israeli siege of Palestinian leader Yasser Arafat's headquarters." The 2005 Land Day commemorations were dedicated to the plight of the unrecognized villages in the Negev, where organizers said 80,000 Arab citizens live without access to basic amenities and 30,000 homes have received demolition orders. Marches in 2008 included one organized in Jaffa where 1,000 Arab citizens used the Land Day commemorations to bring attention to what they described as an acceleration in land confiscations in the city, with many complaining that they were facing evictions and demolition orders designed to force them out of their homes in order to settle Jews from abroad in their place.

Calls to launch non-violent resistance actions to protest against ongoing land confiscations regularly occur on Land Day. For example, the BADIL Resource Center for Palestinian Residency and Refugee Rights issued a press release for Land Day 2006, calling for "boycott, divestment, and sanctions against Israel" and an end to "racial discrimination, occupation, and colonization." During the commemorations for Land Day in 2009, a group of 50 Palestinian women singing Palestinian nationalist songs by Marcel Khleifi and some internationals gathered at the Damascus Gate of the Old City of Jerusalem, to hand out posters and T-shirts calling for a boycott of Israeli products.

Also in 2009, thousands of Arab citizens, some carrying Palestinian flags, marched through the towns of Arrabe and Sakhnin, under the banner, "We are all united under Israeli fascism and racism." Arab Knesset member Talab el-Sana called upon the government, "to put a stop to the racist plans of Judaizing the Galilee and Negev and adopt development policies for all the Galilee and Negev's residents". Ynet reported that protests by Palestinians were planned in locations worldwide, including the US, Canada, Germany, Finland, France and Belgium, and that the World Social Forum (WSF) announced the launching of a campaign calling on all of its affiliates to excommunicate Israel. Land Day was also commemorated in Sabra and the Shatila refugee camp via an art exhibition and musical event, and in the Palestinian territories, where Palestinians demonstrated and threw stones near the Israeli West Bank barrier in Naalin and Jayyous.

In anticipation of Land Day protests of 2012, Israel sealed off the West Bank (but the restrictions did not apply to Israeli settlers). The protests were held in Gaza Strip and the West Bank. In the Gaza Strip, Israeli forces fired at protestors who tried to cross the security fence, resulting in one man killed and 37 injured. At the Qalandia checkpoint, rock-throwing Palestinian youths clashed with Israeli soldiers firing rubber bullets and stun grenades, resulting in 39 Palestinians being injured. In Jordan, 15,000 people, including Palestinians joined in a peaceful sit-in. Palestinian refugees also held demonstrations near Beaufort Castle, Lebanon.

During the 2018 Land Day protests, 17 Palestinians were killed, including five Hamas members, and more than 1,400 were injured in shootings by the Israeli army during a march calling for the Palestinian right of return at the borders with Gaza.

== See also ==
- 2011 Israeli border demonstrations
- House demolition in the Israeli–Palestinian conflict
- International Day of Solidarity with the Palestinian People
- Koenig Memorandum
- Nakba Day
- October 2000 events

== Bibliography ==
- Abdo, Nahla; Lenṭin, Ronit (2002). Women and the politics of military confrontation: Palestinian and Israeli gendered narratives of dislocation. Berghahn Books. ISBN 978-1-57181-498-2. (10)..
- Bar-Tal, Daniel; Teichman, Yona (2005). Stereotypes and prejudice in conflict: representations of Arabs in Israeli Jewish society (Illustrated, reprint ed.). Cambridge University Press. ISBN 978-0-521-80797-5..
- Byman, Daniel (2002). Keeping the peace: lasting solutions to ethnic conflicts. JHU Press. ISBN 978-0-8018-6804-7.
- Endelman, Todd M. (1997). Comparing Jewish societies (Illustrated ed.). University of Michigan Press. ISBN 978-0-472-06592-9.
- Frankel, William (1988). Survey of Jewish affairs. Fairleigh Dickinson University Press. ISBN 978-0-8386-3343-4.
- International Jewish Peace Union, (IJPU) (1987). Israel & Palestine political report (Nos. 130–147 ed.). Magelan S.A.R.L.
- Herb, Guntram Henrik; Kaplan, David H. (1999). Nested identities: nationalism, territory, and scale (Illustrated ed.). Rowman & Littlefield. ISBN 978-0-8476-8467-0. (10)..
- Holzman-Gazit, Yifat (2007). Land expropriation in Israel: law, culture and society]. Ashgate Publishing, Ltd. ISBN 978-0-7546-2543-8. (10)..
- Kimmerling, Baruch; Migdal, Joel S. (1993). Palestinians: the making of a people (Illustrated ed.). Free Press. ISBN 978-0-02-917321-3. (10)..
- Kimmerling, Baruch; Migdal, Joel S. (2003). The Palestinian people: a history (Illustrated ed.). Harvard University Press. ISBN 978-0-674-01129-8. (10)..
- Lévy, Daniel; Weiss, Yfaat (2002). Challenging ethnic citizenship: German and Israeli perspectives on immigration (Illustrated ed.). Berghahn Books. ISBN 978-1-57181-292-6.
- McDowall, David (1990). Palestine and Israel: The Uprising and Beyond (Illustrated, reprint ed.). I.B.Tauris. ISBN 978-1-85043-289-0. (10)..
- Masalha, Nur; Said, Edward W. (2005). Nur Masalha (ed.). Catastrophe remembered: Palestine, Israel and the internal refugees : essays in memory of Edward W. Said (1935–2003). Zed Books. ISBN 978-1-84277-623-0. (10)..
- Payes, Shany (2005). Palestinian NGOs in Israel: the politics of civil society (Illustrated ed.). I.B. Tauris. ISBN 978-1-85043-630-0.
- Nassar, Jamal Raji; Heacock, Roger (1990). Intifada: Palestine at the crossroads (Illustrated ed.). Greenwood Publishing Group. ISBN 978-0-275-93411-8.
- Schulz, Helena Lindholm; Hammer, Juliane (2003). The Palestinian diaspora: formation of identities and politics of homeland (Annotated ed.). Routledge. ISBN 978-0-415-26820-2.
- Sorek, Tamir (2015). Palestinian Commemoration in Israel: Calendars, Monuments, and Martyrs. Stanford, CA: Stanford University Press. ISBN 9780804795180.
- Yiftachel, Oren (2006). Ethnocracy: land and identity politics in Israel/Palestine (Illustrated ed.). University of Pennsylvania Press. ISBN 978-0-8122-3927-0.
