= List of Hebrew exonyms =

This is a list of traditional Hebrew place names. This list includes:

- Places involved in the history (and beliefs) of Canaanite religion, Abrahamic religion and Hebrew culture and the (pre-Modern or directly associated Modern) Hebrew (and intelligible Canaanite) names given to them.
- Places whose official names include a (Modern) Hebrew form.
- Places whose names originate from the Hebrew language.

All names are in the Hebrew alphabet with niqqud, and academically transliterated into Tiberian vocalization (of the Masoretic Text) and Standard Hebrew.

== Names ==
Name			Notes
Hebrew		English	Notes
Hebrew (Niqqud)	Latin (technical)	English	Notes
אֲבַדּוֹן) אבדון)	Avadon (Ǎḇaddon)	Abaddon	
אֱדוֹם) אדום)	Edom (Ěḏom)	Edom	
אוֹפִיר) אופיר)	Ofir (Op̄ir)	Ophir; Sri Lanka; Poovar	Most scholars and sources say that Poovar is the location of Ophir.
אוּר) אור)	Ur (Ur)	Ur	
אִי שׁפָנִים) אי שפנים)	I Shfanim (I Šəp̄ānim)	Spain	Sfarad (סְפָרָד) is the more common name for Spain today.
אַיָּלוֹן) איילון)	Ayalon (Ayyālon)	Ajalon	
אֵילַת) אילת)	Eylat (Ēylaṯ)	Eilat	
אֶפְרַת) אפרת)	Efrat (Ep̄raṯ)	Ephrath	
אֶרֶך) ארך)	Erekh (Ereḵ)	Uruk	
אֲרָם) ארם)	Aram (Ǎrām)	Aram	
אֲרָרָט) אררט)	Ararat (Ǎraraṭ)	Ararat	
אַשּׁוּר) אשור)	Ashur (Aššur)	Assyria	
אַשְׁכְּנַז) אשכנז)	Ashkenaz (Aškənaz)	Germany	The medieval Hebrew name for Germany, while the current one is influenced from Latin, Germaniya (גֶּרְמַנְיָה).
אַשְׁקְלוֹן) אשקלון)	Ashkelon (Ašqəlon)	Ashkelon	
בְּאֵר שֶׁבַע) באר שבע)	Beer Sheva (Bəˀēr Šəḇaˁ)	Beersheba	
בְּאֵרוֹת) בארות)	Beerot (Bəˀēroṯ)	Beirut	
בָּבֵל) בבל)	Bavel (Bāḇēl)	Babylon	
בֵּית אֵל) בית אל)	Beyt El (Bēyṯ Ēl)	Bethel	
בֵּית לֶחֶם) בית לחם)	Beyt Lechem (Bēyṯ Leḥem)	Bethlehem	
בֵּית שְׁאָן) בית שאן)	Beyt Shean (Bēyṯ Šəˀān)	Beit Shean	
בֵּית שֶׁמֶשׁ) בית שמש)	Beyt Shemesh (Bēyṯ Šemeš)	Beit Shemesh	
בָּצְרָה) בצרה)	Botzra (Boṣra)	Bozrah	
בְּתוּאֵל) בתואל)	Btuel (Bəṯuˀēl)	Bethuel	
גְּבַל) גבל)	Gval (Gəḇal)	Byblos	
גִּבעוֹן) גבעון)	Givon (Giḇˁon)	Gibeon	
גָּדֵר) גדר)	Gader (Gāḏēr)	Cádiz	
גּוֹלָן) גולן)	Golan (Golān)	Golan	
גּוֹשֶׁן) גושן)	Goshen (Gošen)	Goshen	
גִּלְגָּל) גלגל)	Gilgal (Gilgāl)	Gilgal	
גִּלעָד) גלעד)	Gilad (Gilˁāḏ)	Gilead	
גְּרָר) גרר)	Grar (Gərār)	Gerar	
גַּת) גת)	Gat (Gaṯ)	Gath	
דַּמֶּשֶׂק) דמשק)	Damesek (Dammeśeq)	Damascus	
הַגָּלִיל) הגליל)	haGalil (hagGālil)	Galilee	
הודּוּ) הודו)	Hodu (Hoddu)	India	Almost always is used for India, but it is also the rarely used name for Türkiye as well.
הָעֲרָבָה) הערבה)	haArava (hāˁǍrāḇa)	Arabah	
הַר גְּרִזִּים) הר גריזים)	Har Grizim (Har Gərizzim)	Mount Gerizzim	
הַר הַבַּיִת) הר הבית)	Har haBayit (Har habBayiṯ)	Temple Mount	
הַר הַזֵּיתִים) הר הזיתים)	Har haZeytim (Har hazZeyṯim)	Mount Olivet	
הַר הַצּוֹפִים) הר הצופים)	Har haTzofim (Har haṣṢop̄im)	Mount Scopus	
הַר חֶרְמוֹן) הר חרמון)	Har Chermon (Har Ḥermon)	Mount Hermon	
הַר נְבוֹ) הר נבו)	Har Nevo (Har Nəḇo)	Mount Nebo	
הַר פִּסְגָה) הר פסגה)	Har Pisga (Har Pisga)	Mount Pisgah	
חֶבְרוֹן) חברון)	Chevron (Ḥeḇron)	Hebron	
חֲוִילָה) חוילה)	Chavila (Ḥǎwila)	Havilah	
חוֹלוֹן) חולון)	Cholon (Ḥolon)	Holon	
חָרְמָה) חורמה)	Chorma (Ḥorma)	Hormah	
חֵיפָה) חיפה)	Cheyfa (Ḥeyp̄a)	Haifa	
חִמְיָר) חמיר)	Chimyar (Ḥimyār)	Himyar	
טְבֶרְיָה) טבריה)	Tverya (Ṭəḇerya)	Tiberias	
יֵב) יב)	Yev (Yēḇ)	Elephantine	
יְבוּס) יבוס)	Yevus (Yəḇus)	Jebus	
יַבּוֹק) יבוק)	Yabok (Yabboq)	Jabbok	
יַבְנֶה) יבנה)	Yavne (Yaḇne)	Yavneh	
יְהוּדָה) יהודה)	Yehuda (Yəhuḏa)	Judea	
יָוָן) יוון)	Yavan (Yāwān)	Greece	Inspired the Arabic, and other Arabic-inspired names for Greece.
יִזְרָעאֵל) יזרעאל)	Yizrael (Yizrāˁˀēl)	Jezreel	
יָם הַמֶּלַח) ים המלח)	Yam haMelach (Yām hamMelaḥ)	Dead Sea	
יַם כִּנֶּרֶת) ים כנרת)	Yam Kineret (Yām Kinnereṯ)	Sea of Galilee	
יָפֹה) יפה)	Yafo (Yāp̄o)	Jaffa	
יָקְנְעָם) יקנעם)	Yokneam (Yoqnəˁām)	Yokneam	
יָרְדֵּן) ירדן)	Yarden (Yārədēn)	Jordan	Used also for the Jordan River.
יְרוּשָלַיִּם) ירושלים)	Yerushalayim (Yərušālayyim)	Jerusalem	
יְרִיחוֹ) יריחו)	Yericho (Yəriḥo)	Jericho	
יִשְׂרָאֵל) ישראל)	Yisrael (Yiśrāˀēl)	Israel	
יַתְרִיב) יתריב)	Yatriv (Yaṯriḇ)	Yathrib	Old name of Medina
כּוּשׁ) כוש)	Kush (Kuš)	Cush	
כְּנַעַן) כנען)	Knaan (Kənaˁan)	Canaan	
כֶּשֶׂד) כשד)	Kesed (Keśeḏ)	Chaldea	
לְבָנוֹן) לבנן)	Levanon (Ləḇānon)	Lebanon	
לוּב) לוב)	Luv (Luḇ)	Libya	
לוֹד) לוד)	Lod (Loḏ)	Lod	
מְגִדּוֹ) מגידו)	Megido (Məḡiddo)	Megiddo	
מִדְיָן) מדין)	Midyan (Miḏyān)	Midian	
מוֹאָב) מואב)	Moav (Moˀāḇ)	Moab	
מֵידְבָא) מידבא)	Meydva (Mēyḏḇaˀ)	Madaba	
מְצָדָה) מצדה)	Metzada (Məṣāḏa)	Masada	
מִצְרָיִם) מצרים)	Mitzrayim (Miṣrāyim)	Egypt	Inspired the Arabic, and other Arabic-inspired names for Egypt.
נוֹב) נוב)	Nov (Noḇ)	Nob	
נֶגֶב) נגב)	Negev (Neḡeḇ)	Negev	
נָצְרַת) נצרת)	Natzrat (Nāṣəraṯ)	Nazareth	
סְדוֹם) סדום)	Sdom (Səḏom)	Sodom	
סִינַי) סיני)	Sinay (Sinay)	Sinai	
סְפָרָד) ספרד)	Sfarad (Səp̄ārāḏ)	Spain	
עֵדֶן) עדן)	Eden (ˁĒḏen)	Eden	
עוּץ) עוץ)	Utz (ˁUṣ)	Uz	
עַזָּה) עזה)	Aza (ˁAzza)	Gaza	
עֲזֵקָה) עזקה)	Azeka (ˁǍzēqa)	Azekah	
עֵין גַּנִּים) עין גנים)	Eyn Ganim (ˁĒyn Gannim)	Jenin	
עַכּוֹ) עכו)	Ako (ˁAkko)	Acre	
עַמּוֹן) עמון)	Amon (ˁAmmon)	Ammon	
עֲמוֹרָה) עמורה)	Amora (ˁǍmora)	Gomorrah	
עֶצְיוֹן גֶּבֶר) עציון גבר)	Etzyon Gever (ˁEṣyon Geḇer)	Ezion-Geber	
עֶקְרוֹן) עקרון)	Ekron (ˁEqron)	Ekron	
עֲרָד) ערד)	Arad (ˁǍrāḏ)	Arad	
פְּלֶשֶׁת) פלשת)	Pleshet (Pəlešeṯ)	Philistia	
פָּרָס) פרס)	Paras (Pārās)	Persia	
צְבוֹיִּם) צבויים)	Tzvoyim (Ṣəḇoyim)	Zeboim	
צוֹר) צור)	Tzor (Ṣor)	Tyre	
צִידוֹן) צידון)	Tzidon (Ṣiḏon)	Sidon	
צִיּוֹן) ציון)	Tziyon (Ṣiyon)	Zion	
צַנְעָא) צנעא)	Tzan'a (Ṣanˁaˀ)	Sanaa	
צְפַת) צפת)	Tzfat (Ṣəp̄aṯ)	Safed	
צִקְלַג) צקלג)	Tziklag (Ṣiqlaḡ)	Ziklag	
צָרְפַת) צרפת)	Tzarfat (Ṣārəp̄aṯ)	Sarepta; France	
קָדֵשׁ) קדש)	Kadesh (Qāḏēš)	Kadesh	
קַפְרִיסִין) קפריסין)	Kafrisin (Qap̄risin)	Cyprus	
קֶרֶת חֲדֶשֶׁת) קרקת חדשת)	Keret Chadeshet (Qereṯ Ḥǎḏešeṯ)	Carthage	
רַבַּת עַמּוֹן) רבת עמון)	Rabat Amon (Rabbaṯ ˁAmmon)	Amman	
רְחוֹבוֹת) רחובות)	Rechovot (Rəḥoḇoṯ)	Rehoboth	
שְׁבָא) שבא)	Shva (Šəḇaˀ)	Sheba	
שׁוֹמרוֹן) שומרון)	Shomron (Šomron)	Samaria	
שְׁכֶם) שכם)	Shkhem (Šəḵem)	Shechem; Nablus	
שִׁילֹה) שילה)	Shilo (Šilo)	Shiloh	
שְׁפֵלָה) שפלה)	Shfela (Šəp̄ēla)	Shephelah	
שָׁרוֹן) שרון)	Sharon (Šāron)	Sharon	
תֵּימָן) תימן)	Teyman (Tēymān)	Yemen	
תְּקוֹעַ) תקוע)	Tekoa (Təqoaˁ)	Tekoa	
תַּרְשִׁישׁ) תרשיש)	Tarshish (Taršiš)	Tarshish	

== See also ==
- Glossary of Hebrew toponyms
- List of Arabic place names
- List of Aramaic place names
- List of English words of Hebrew origin
- Hebrew name
- Hebraization of Palestinian place names
