= Kfar =

Kfar or KFAR may refer to:

- Kfar, a component of Hebrew placenames literally meaning "village"
- KFAR, a radio station in Fairbanks, Alaska, United States

- KATN, a television station in Fairbanks, Alaska, which had the call letters KFAR-TV from 1955 to 1981

- KFAR, ICAO code for Hector International Airport
