= Yeshayahu Press =

Israeli geographer (1874–1955)

- ישעיהו פרס
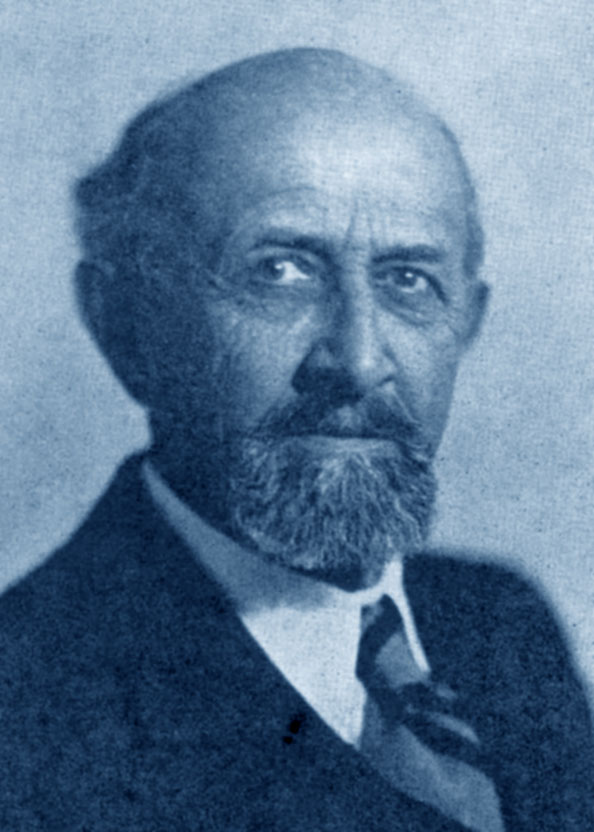
- Born: 2 March 1874; Jerusalem, Ottoman Empire
- Died: 11 June 1955 (aged 81); Jerusalem, Israel
- Occupations: Researcher; Educator; Author
- Known for: Topographical-Historical Encyclopedia of the Land of Israel; Founding of the "Government Naming Committee"
- Notable work: The Book of Travels in Eretz Israel and Southern Syria (1921)
- Parents: Haim Press; Sarah Press

Yeshayahu Press (Hebrew: ישעיהו פרס; March 2, 1874 – June 11, 1955) was a prominent researcher of the land of Israel and educator, who was born and lived most of his life in Jerusalem. He wrote the first volumes of the four-volume Topographical-Historical Encyclopedia of the Land of Israel (1947/48-1954/55). During Ottoman and then British rule in Palestine, Press served as the first Secretary of the (Jewish) Teachers' Union, helped establish the Jewish Palestine Exploration Society, taught and worked as a school principal, served as President of the Bnei Brit Chamber and helped create a Bnei Brit fund for building houses, was among the founders of the Zichron Moshe neighbourhood in Jerusalem, and so forth. With the 1948 founding of the modern state of Israel, Press was among the driving force behind the establishment of the "Government Naming Committee" in 1949.

Yeshayahu Press was the son of Haim Press, a linguist and newspaper man who lived in Jerusalem and contributed to the revival of the Hebrew language, and Sarah, a teacher at the girls' school founded by Moses Montefiore.

Press was the author of several books, including the travel guide "The Book of Travels in Eretz Israel and Southern Syria", published in Hebrew and German in 1921.

== Legacy ==
Moshav Givat Yeshayahu and a Jerusalem street are named after him.
