= List of Aramaic place names =

This is a list of Aramaic place names; list of the names of places as they exist in the Aramaic language.

== Names ==
=== ܐ ===
Aramaic	Transliteration	IPA	English; Modern name
ܐܘܪܗܝ	ʾŪrhāy		Edessa
ܐܘܚܕܢܐ ܡܚܘܝܕ݂ܐ	ʾŪḥdānē Mḥūyḏēʾ		United States
ܐܘܿܪ	ʾŪr		Ur
ܐܘܿܪܘܿܟ	ʼÉreḵ		Uruk
ܐܘܪܡܝܐ	ʾŪrmīāʾ		Urmia
ܐܘܪܫܠܡ	ʾŪrēšlem		Jerusalem
ܐܝܛܠܝܐ	ʾĪṭālyāʾ		Italy
ܐܝܛܠܝܐ	ʾĪṭālyāʾ		Attalia
ܐܝܣܪܐܝܠ	ʾĪsrāʾēl		Israel
ܐܝܩܢܘܢ	ʾĪqānēwān		Iconium; Konya
ܐܝܪܝܚܘ	ʾĪrīḥō		Jericho
ܐܟܐܝܐ	ʾĀḵāyāʾ		Achaea
ܐܠܟܣܢܕܪܝܐ	ʾAleksandrīāʾ		Alexandria
ܐܠܩܘܫ	ʾAlqōš		Alqosh
ܐܡܝܕ	ʾAmīḏ		Amida
ܐܣܝܐ	ʾĀsyāʾ		Asia
ܐܣܦܢܝܐ	ʾAspanyāʾ		Hispania; Spain
ܐܦܣܘܣ	ʾEᵽesōs		Ephesus
ܐܪܒܝܐ	ʾAraḇīāʾ		Arabia
ܐܪܒܠܐ	'Arbelā		Arbil
ܐܪܥܕܢ	ʾAra'den		Araden
ܐܪܡ	ʾĀrām		Aram; Syria
ܐܪܡܘܬܐ	'Arm'ūṭā		Armota
ܐܪܦܗܐ	'Arraphā		Kirkuk
ܐܫܘܪ	ʾĀšūr		Assur
ܐܬܘܪ	ʾĀṯūr		Assyria
ܐܝܪܢ	'Īrān		Iran
ܐܬܢܘܣ	ʾAṯēnōs		Athens
ܐܣܛܗܪ	ʾIsṭahar		Istakhr
ܐܣܦܗܢ	ʾIspahān		Isfahan

=== ܒ ===
Aramaic	Transliteration	IPA	English; Modern Name
ܒܒܠ	Bāḇēl		Babylon
ܒܓܕܕ	Baḡdād		Baghdad
ܒܝܬ ܕܪ̈ܐ	Bēṯ Dārē		Bedare
ܒܝܬ ܠܚܡ	Bēṯ Lḥem		Bethlehem
ܒܝܬ ܢܗܪ̈ܝܢ	Bēṯ Nahrīn		Beth Nahrain, Mesopotamia
ܒܝܬ ܩܛܖ̈ܝܐ	Bēṯ Qaṭrāyē		Qatar
ܒܝܬ ܡܙܘܢܝ̈ܐ	Bēṯ Mazunāyē		Oman
ܒܝܬ ܦܖ̈ܣܝܐ	Bēṯ Pārsāyē		Fars province
ܒܝܬ ܗܘܙ̈ܝܐ	Bēṯ Hozāyē		Khuzistan
ܒܝܬ ܢܘܗܕܪܐ	Bēṯ Nōhadrā		Dohuk
ܒܝܬ ܙܒܕܝ̈	Bēṯ Zaḇdai		Cizre
ܒܝܬ ܙܠܝ̈ܢ	Bēṯ Zālīn		Qamishli
ܒܝܬ ܪ̈ܙܝܩܝܐ	Bēṯ Rāzeqāyē		Rey
ܒܝܬ ܐܝܠ	Bēṯ 'Ēl		Bedial
ܒܝܬ ܥܢܝܐ	Bēṯ ʿAnyāʾ		Bethany
ܒܝܬ ܠܦܛ	Bēṯ Lapaṭ		Gundeshapur

=== ܓ ===
Aramaic	Transliteration	IPA	English; Modern Name
ܓܙܪܬܐ	Gāzartā		Cizre
ܓܓܘܠܬܐ	Gāḡōltāʾ		Golgotha
ܓܕܣܡܢ	Gedsēman		Gethsemane
ܓܗܢܐ	Gēhanāʾ		Gehenna, Hell
ܓܙܐ	Gazāʾ		Gaza
ܓܝܚܘܢ	Gīḥōn		Gihon
ܓܠܛܝܐ	Galaṭīāʾ		Galatia
ܓܠܝܠܐ	Glīlāʾ		Galilee
ܓܦܝܦܬܐ	Gᵽīᵽtāʾ		Gabbatha

=== ܕ ===
Aramaic	Transliteration	IPA	English; Modern Name
ܕܩܠܬ	Deqlaṯ		Tigris
ܕܪܒܐ	Derbēʾ		Derbe
ܕܪܡܣܘܩ	Darmsūq		Damascus

=== ܗ ===
Aramaic	Transliteration	IPA	English; Modern Name
ܗܘܪܡܝܙܕ ܐܪܕܫܝܪ	Hormīzd Ardašīr		Ahvaz
ܗܢܕܘ	Hendū		India
ܗܢܕܝܐ	Hendīāʾ		India

=== ܙ ===
Aramaic	Transliteration	IPA	English; Modern Name
ܙܒܐ	Zāḇāʾ		Zab; may refer to the Great Zab or the Little Zab
ܙܒܐ ܥܠܝܐ	Zāḇāʾ ʿElāyāʾ		Great Zab
ܙܒܐ ܬܚܬܝܐ	Zāḇāʾ Taḥtāyāʾ		Little Zab
ܙܡܘܪܢܐ	Zmūrnāʾ		Smyrna

=== ܚ ===
Aramaic	Transliteration	IPA	English; Modern Name
ܚܛܪܐ	Ḥaṭrā		Hatra
ܚܛܐ	Ḥattā		Hatta
ܚܒܪܘܢ	Ḥeḇrōn		Hebron
ܚܩܠ ܕܡܐ	Ḥqal Dmāʾ		Akeldama

=== ܛ ===
Aramaic	Transliteration	IPA	English; Modern Name
ܛܗܪܢ	Ṭehrān		Tehran
ܛܘܪ ܥܒܕܝܢ	Ṭūr ʿAḇdīn		Tur Abdin
ܛܪܘܐܘܣ	Ṭrōaʾōs		Troas
ܛܪܣܘܣ	Ṭarsōs		Tarsus

=== ܝ ===
Aramaic	Transliteration	IPA	English; Modern Name
ܝܘܢܢ	Yāwnān		Greece
ܝܘܢ	Yawān		Greece
ܝܗܘܕ	Yēhūḏ		Judea
ܝܘܿܪܕܢܵܢ	Yūrdnān		Jordan River

=== ܟܟ ===
Aramaic	Transliteration	IPA	English; Modern Name
ܟܘܫ	Kush		Cush; Ethiopia
ܟܢܥܢ	Knaʿn		Canaan
ܟܪܟܐ ܕܒܝܬ ܣܠܘܟ	Karkhā d-Bēṯ Slōkh		Kirkuk
ܟܦܪܢܚܘܡ	Kᵽarnaḥūm		Capernaum

=== ܠ ===
Aramaic	Transliteration	IPA	English; Modern Name
ܠܒܢܢ	Lebnān		Lebanon
ܠܘܒܐ	Lūḇēʾ		Libya
ܠܘܣܛܪܐ	Lūsṭrāʾ		Lystra
ܠܘܩܝܐ	Lūqīāʾ		Lycia
ܠܘܩܢܝܐ	Lūqānīāʾ		Lycaonia

=== ܡܡ ===
Aramaic	Transliteration	IPA	English; Modern Name
ܡܕܝܕ	Meḏyaḏ		Midian
ܡܘܣܝܐ	Mūsīāʾ		Mysia
ܡܝܠܝܛܘܣ	Mīlīṭōs		Miletus
ܡܨܪܝܢ	Meṣrēn		Egypt
ܡܩܕܘܢܝܐ	Maqeḏwānīāʾ		Macedonia
ܡܚܘܙ̈ܐ ܚܕܬܐ	Māḥōzē Ḥdattā		Wēh-Andiok Ḵosrow
ܡܪܕܐ	Merdā		Mardin

=== ܢܢ ===
Aramaic	Transliteration	IPA	English; Modern Name
ܢܘܗܕܪܐ	Nūhadrāʾ		Dahuk
ܢܝܠܘܣ	Nīlōs		Nile
ܢܡܪܘܕ	Nāmrūd		Nimrud
ܢܝܢܘܐ	Nīnwēʾ		Nineveh
ܢܨܝܒܝܢ	Nṣīḇīn		Nisibis
ܢܨܪܬ	Nāṣraṯ		Nazareth

=== ܣ ===
Aramaic	Transliteration	IPA	English; Modern Name
ܣܠܝܩ	Salīq		Seleucia-on-Tigris
ܣܕܘܡ	Sḏūm		Sodom
ܣܘܪܝܐ	Sūrīāʾ		Syria
ܣܪܘܓ	Srūḡʾ		Suruç
ܣܝܢܐ	Sīnāʾ		China
ܣܝܢܝ	Sīnay		Sinai
ܣܠܡܢܐ	Salamēnēʾ		Salamis

=== ܥ ===
Aramaic	Transliteration	IPA	English; Modern Name
ܥܕܢ	ʿḎen		Eden
ܥܡܘܪܐ	ʿĀmōrāʾ		Gomorrah

=== ܦ ===
Aramaic	Transliteration	IPA	English; Modern Name
ܦܪܬ	Prāṯ		Euphrates
ܦܪܬ ܕܡܝܫܢ	Prāṯ d-Maišān		Basra
ܦܪܣ	Pārs		Persia
ܦܘܢܝܩܐ	Pūnīqēʾ		Phoenicia
ܦܝܠܕܠܦܝܐ	Ᵽīlaḏelᵽīāʾ		Philadelphia
ܦܝܣܝܕܝܐ	Pīsīḏīāʾ		Pisidia
ܦܡܦܘܠܝܐ	Pamᵽūlīāʾ		Pamphylia
ܦܢܛܘܣ	Pānṭōs		Pontus
ܦܪܓܐ	Perḡēʾ		Perga
ܦܪܘܓܝܐ	Ᵽrūḡīāʾ		Phrygia

=== ܨ ===
Aramaic	Transliteration	IPA	English; Modern Name
ܨܗܝܘܢ	Ṣehyōn		Zion
ܨܘܒܐ	Ṣawbāʾ		Nisibis
ܨܘܪ	Ṣūr		Tyre
ܨܝܕܢ	Ṣaydān		Sidon
ܨܪܦܬ	Ṣarpaṯ		Sarepta

=== ܩ ===
Aramaic	Transliteration	IPA	English; Modern Name
ܩܛܝܣܦܘܢ	Qṭēspōn		Ctesiphon
ܩܘܦܪܘܣ	Qūprōs		Cyprus
ܩܘܪܝܢܐ	Qūrīnēʾ		Cyrene
ܩܘܪܝܢܬܘܣ	Qōrīnṯōs		Corinth
ܩܛܢܐ	Qāṭnēʾ		Cana
ܩܝܠܝܩܝܐ	Qīlīqīāʾ		Cilicia
ܩܦܕܘܩܝܐ	Qapaḏōqīāʾ		Cappadocia
ܩܪܛܐ	Qrēṭēʾ		Crete

=== ܪ ===
Aramaic	Transliteration	IPA	English; Modern Name
ܪܗܘܡܐ	Rōmēʾ		Rome
ܪܘܕܘܣ	Rōḏōs		Rhodes
ܪܡܬܐ	Rāmṯāʾ		Arimathaea

=== ܫ ===
Aramaic	Transliteration	IPA	English; Modern Name
ܫܘܫܬܪܝܢ	Šūšṭrīn		Shushtar
ܫܘܫ	Šūš		Susa
ܫܝܘܠ	Šyūl		Sheol
ܫܡܝܐ	Šmayāʾ		Heaven
ܫܡܪܝܢ	Šāmrīn		Samaria

=== ܬ ===
Aramaic	Transliteration	IPA	English; Modern Name
ܬܕܡܘܪ	Taḏmūr		Palmyra
ܬܠ ܙܩܝܦܐ	Tel Zqīpā		Tesqopa
ܬܠ ܟܐܦܐ	Tel Kēpēʾ		Tel Keppe
ܬܣܠܘܢܝܩܐ	Ṯesalōnīqēʾ		Thessalonica
ܬܐܘܛܝܪܐ	Ṯeʾwāṭērāʾ		Thyatira
