= Government Naming Committee =

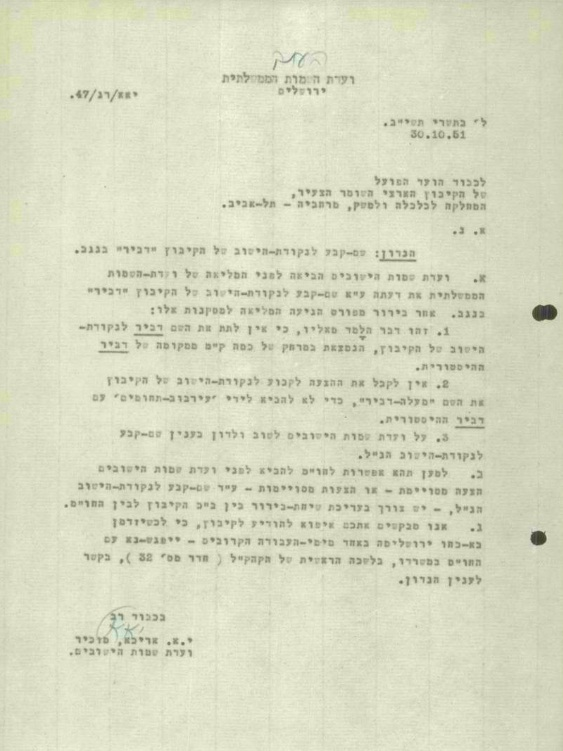
Letter from the Government Naming Committee to the Kibbutz Artzi movement secretariat regarding naming kibbutz Dvir. October 30, 1951

Government Naming Committee (Hebrew: ועדת השמות הממשלתית, romanized: Va'adat ha-Shemot ha-Memshaltit, sometimes referred as National Naming Committee or Government Names Committee) is a public committee appointed by the Government of Israel, which deals with the designation of names for communities and other points on the map of Israel, and the replacement of Arabic names that existed until 1948 with Hebrew names. The committee's decisions bind state institutions.

Established by David Ben-Gurion 7 July 1949, it included members of the Jewish Palestine Exploration Society. Four months after the conquest of the Negev, the committee's first assignment was to determine "Hebrew names for all places-mountains, valleys, springs, roads etc. in the Negev region." It then took on the Hebraization of place names in "the whole territory of the state." The committee established the principle of seeking "historical identifications," meaning ancient Hebrew—not Arabic—names and references. Although these "historical" names were preferred, identifiers that could be culled from the Bible were not sufficient to supply all necessary Hebrew names; for the Negev, for example, there were only 40. The committee reported:

The choosing of names was not a simple problem. In our sources a lot of names of settlements are mentioned, but there are very few names for other geographical formations. For example, the names of rivers and streams mentioned in the Bible number 32, of which only 18 are west of the Jordan; from the Mishna and the Tosefta come to us another five names, and from Greek and Roman sources another 1 2, altogether we have inherited from the ancients 35 names for streams, but our maps need approximately 900 names ... and ... this is the same situation vis-a-vis springs, mountains, valleys and so forth.

The names also had to be accurately located, and for many there were disputes regarding exact location, and the process often required "guess work". When finding a "historical" Hebrew name was not possible, there was a list of alternative approaches: second, to use a name from the Bible; third, to translate Arabic names into Hebrew; fourth, to Hebraize Arabic names by form according to similarity in sounds or roots; and fifth, to coin new "symbolic" names, often relating to references of significance from the modern Zionist movement or the war of 1948.

According to Nadia Abu El Haj, this cartographic-linguistic work mirrored the late-nineteenth-century survey project of the British Christian Palestine Exploration Fund. Most of the time, the names of antiquities sites were determined, not based on textual sources, but rather from relying on existing Arabic names.

== See also ==
- Hebraization of Palestinian place names
