= Glossary of Hebrew toponyms =

This glossary gives translations of Hebrew terms commonly found as components in Hebrew toponyms.

== B ==
Be'er
Beer
Be'erot (plural)
בְּאֵר, wiktionary:באר, 'well'; plural בְּאֵרוֹת
Beit
Bayit (sometimes)
Beth
Bet
בֵּית, wiktionary:בית, 'house'

== E ==
Ein
'En
עַיִן, wiktionary:עין, 'spring, fountain'
Emek
עֵמֶק, wiktionary:עמק, 'valley'

== G ==
Gan
גַּן, wiktionary:גן, 'garden'
Giv'at
Givat
Givatayim (dual)
Giv'ot (plural)
גִּבְעַת, wiktionary:גבעה, 'hill'

== H ==
Har
הַר, wiktionary:הר, 'mountain'

== I ==
Illit
עילית, wiktionary:עילית, 'upper'

== K ==
Kerem
כֶּרֶם, wiktionary:כרם, 'vineyard'
Kfar
כְּפַר, wiktionary:כפר, 'village'
Kiryat
Qiryat
קִרְיַת, wiktionary:קריה, 'town'

== M ==
Ma'ayan
Ma'yan
מעיין, wiktionary:מעיין, 'spring, fountain'
Mishmar
מִשְׁמַר, wiktionary:משמר, 'guard'

== N ==
Nahal
נַחַל, wiktionary:נחל, stream, wadi, Biblical Hebrew: 'valley'
Neve
Neot (plural)
נְוֵה, נוה, in this context: '(place of) residence, abode, oasis'; plural נאות

== Q ==
- Qiryat: see Kiryat

== R ==
Ramat
רָמַת, wiktionary:רמה, 'heights, highlands'; plural Ramot
Ramot
רָמוֹת, 'heights, highlands'; plural of Ramat
Rosh
רֹאשׁ, wiktionary:ראש, 'head'

== T ==
Tel
תֵל, wiktionary:תל, 'mound (tell), hill', often in names of archaeological sites
Tzur
Tsur
צוּר, wiktionary:צור, 'rock, cliff'

== See also ==
- List of Hebrew place names
- Hebraization of Palestinian place names
