= Gaza genocide =

Ongoing genocide in the Gaza Strip

- Part of the Gaza war in the Israeli–Palestinian conflict
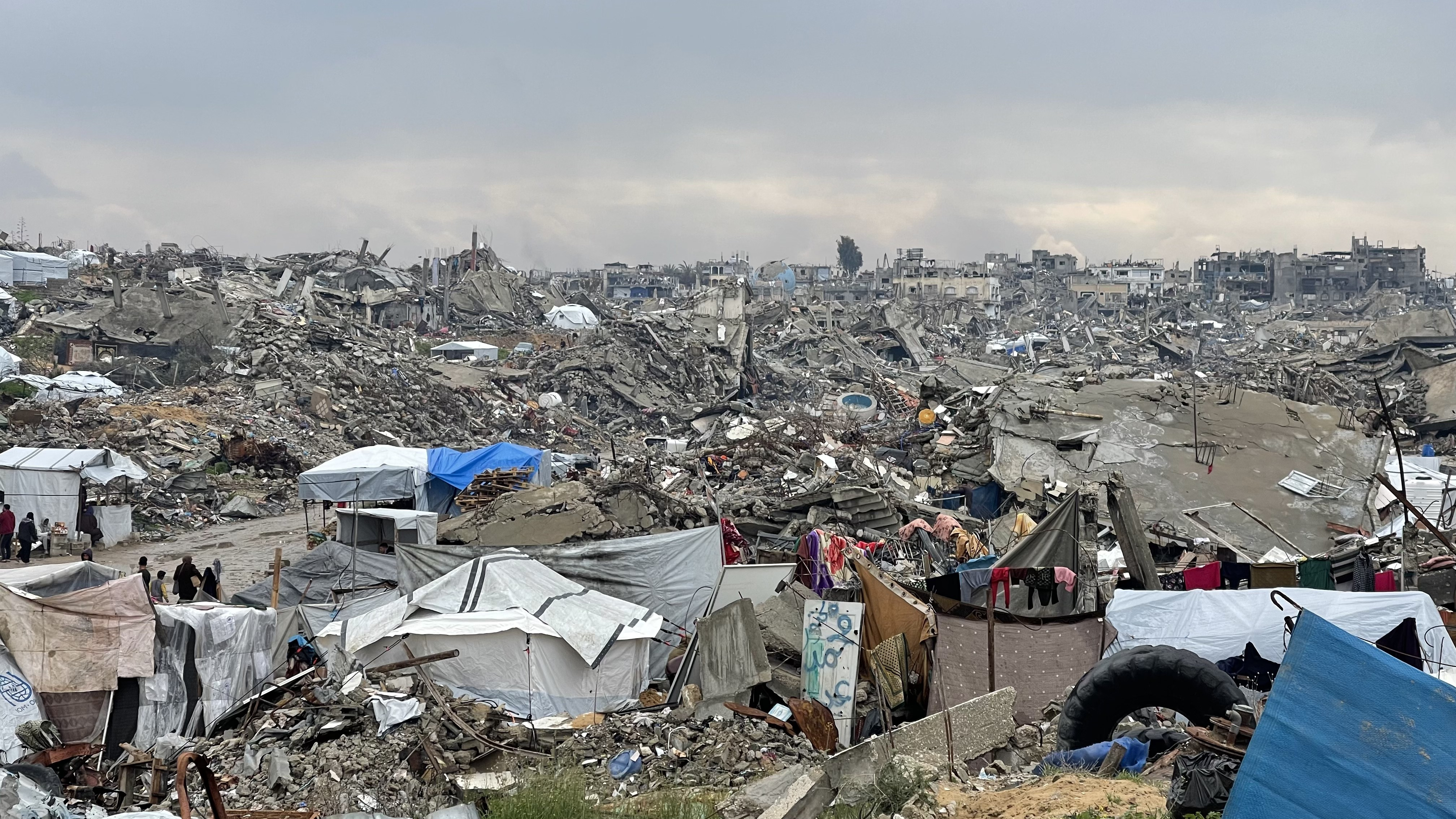
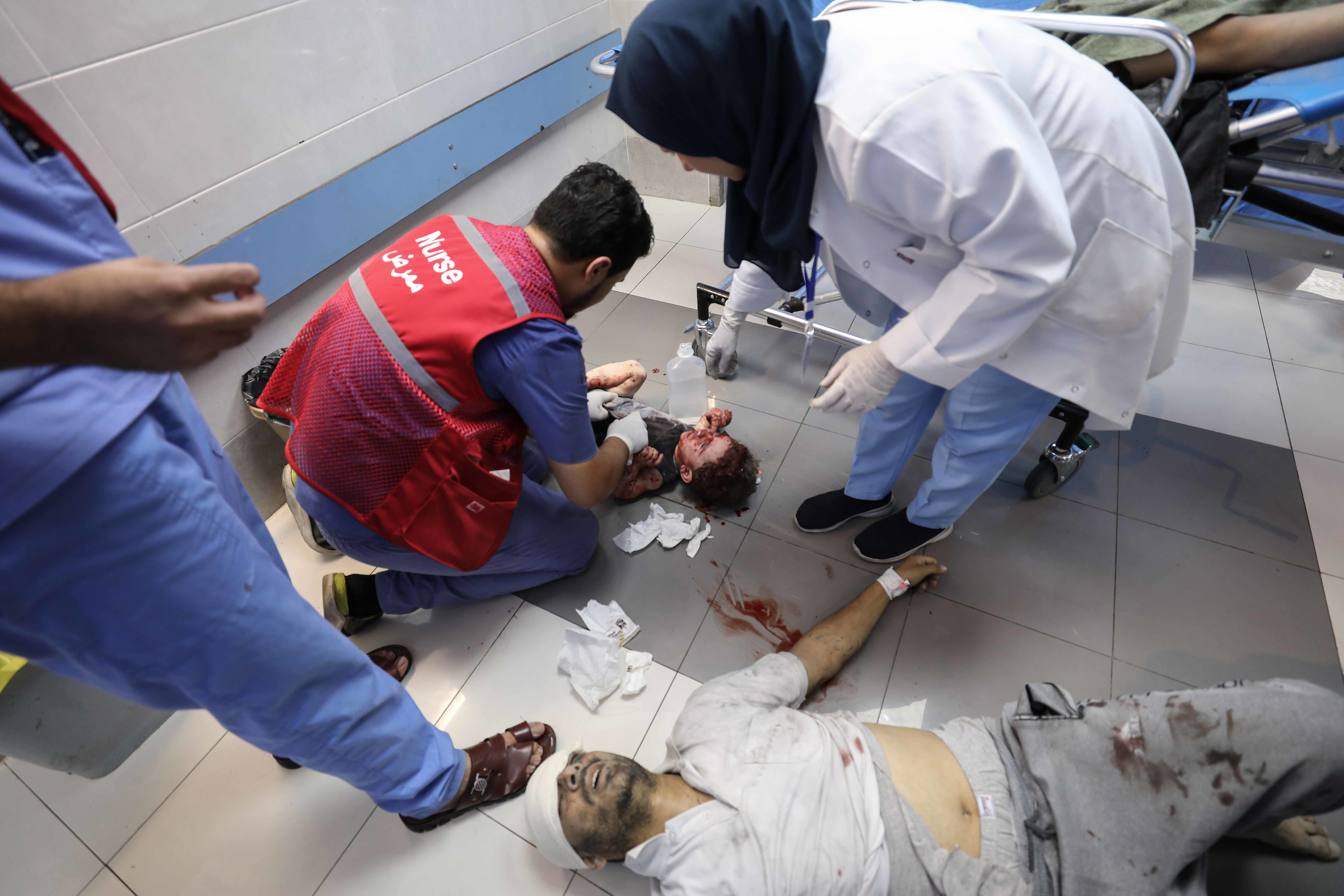
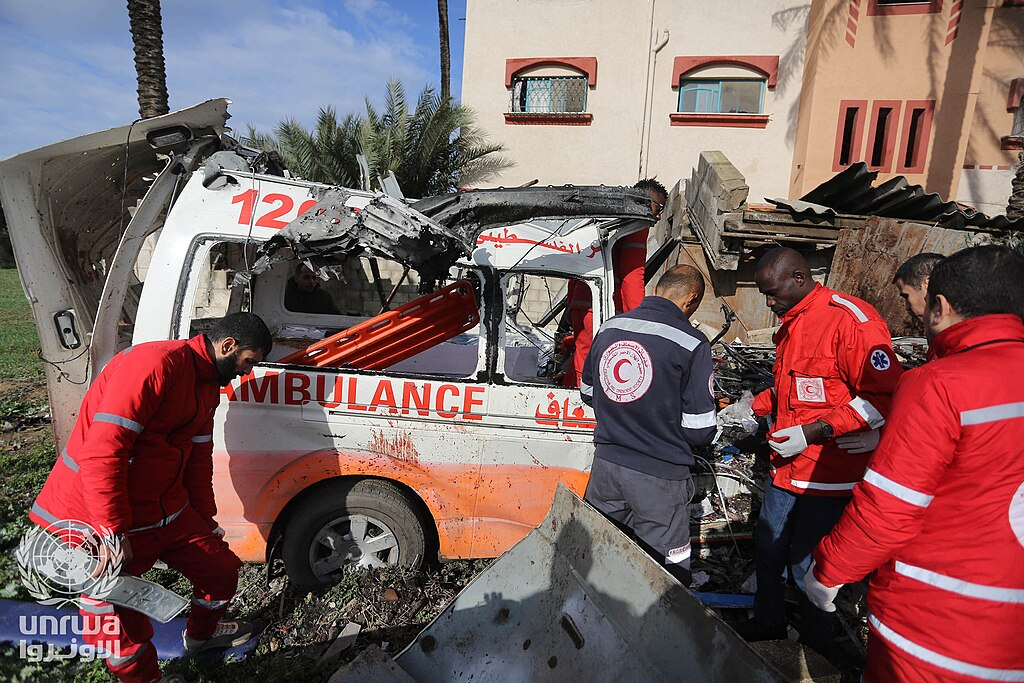
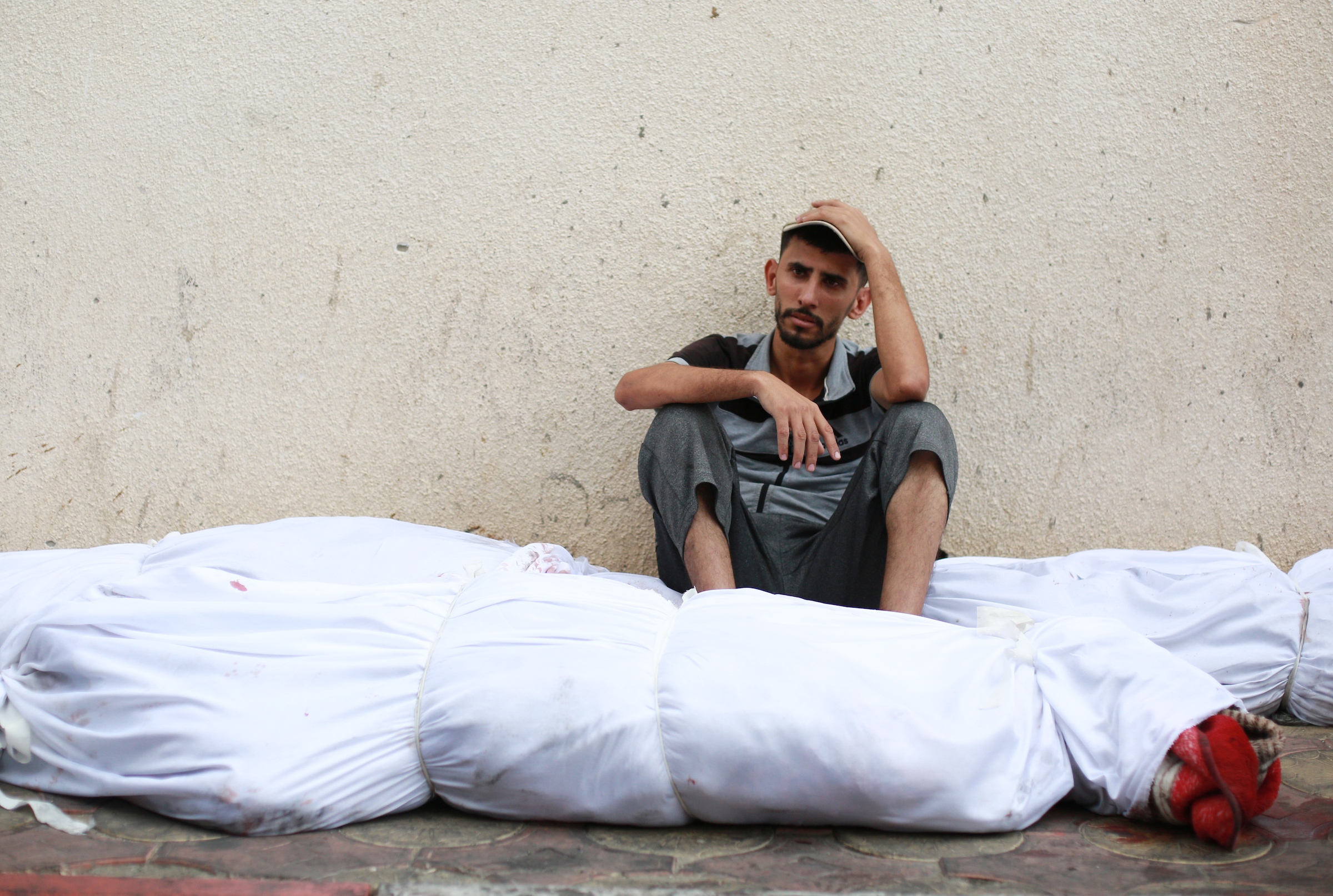
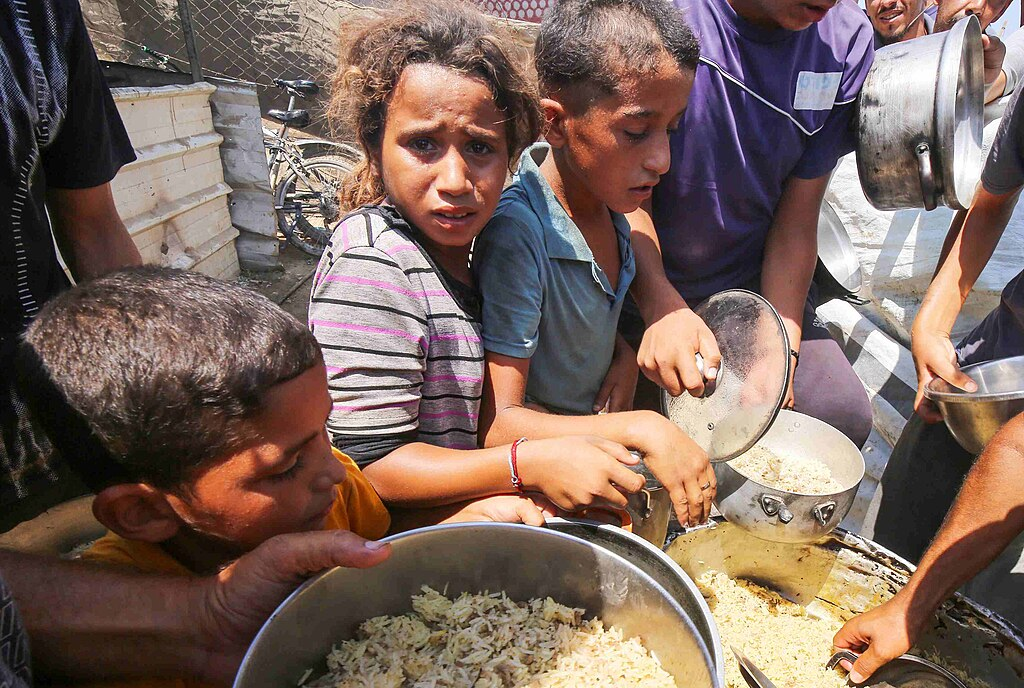
- Photographs of the Gaza genocide: Top: Widespread destruction in the northern Gaza Strip due to the Israeli bombing campaign (February 2025); Middle-left: A Palestinian child receiving medical treatment on the floor at the overcrowded emergency ward of Al-Shifa Hospital in Gaza City (October 2023); Middle-right: A bombed ambulance belonging to the Palestine Red Crescent Society (January 2024); Bottom-left: A Palestinian man sitting among shrouded corpses in the Jabalia refugee camp (October 2023); Bottom-right: Displaced Palestinian children in Deir el-Balah attempting to receive food donated by international charities amidst the Gaza Strip famine due to the Israeli blockade (August 2024)
- Location: Israeli-occupied Gaza Strip (Palestine)
- Date: Following 7 October 2023 – present (Note: The Hamas-led October 7 attacks against Israel formally mark the beginning of the war, but sources disagree on the start date of the genocide within the war. See § Background.)
- Target: Palestinian people
- Attack type: Genocide, war crimes, crimes against humanity, massacres, ethnic cleansing, forced displacement, bombardment, blockade, democide, targeted killings, starvation, torture, rape and sexual violence, attacks on healthcare, birth prevention, ecocide, urbicide, scholasticide
- Deaths: 74,500 direct deaths (recorded figure, September 2026) (Note: Overall deaths since 7 October 2023 per the Gaza Health Ministry, which has been deemed reliable by independent organisations and Israeli security officials. The Ministry's public totals are aggregate and include both civilians and combatants.); 463 famine deaths (confirmed, November 2025); 8,000–10,000 presumed buried under rubble
- Injuries: At least 175,600
- Perpetrator: State of Israel
- Litigation: South Africa v. Israel; Nicaragua v. Germany

The Gaza genocide is the ongoing, intentional, and systematic destruction of the Palestinian people in the Gaza Strip carried out by Israel during the Gaza war. It encompasses mass killings, including the targeted killing of children (who account for 30% of those killed), deliberate starvation, infliction of serious bodily and mental harm, and prevention of births. Israel maintains a blockade on the Gaza Strip, restricting Gazans' freedom of movement and access to outside aid. The Israel Defense Forces have destroyed civilian infrastructure, including educational, religious, and cultural sites and healthcare facilities, and killed healthcare workers and aid-seekers. Palestinians in Gaza also face forced mass displacement and sexual violence. The genocide has been recognized, in either a legal or scholarly sense, by a United Nations special committee and commission of inquiry, the International Association of Genocide Scholars, multiple human rights groups, (Note: Amnesty International, Médecins Sans Frontières, B'Tselem, Physicians for Human Rights–Israel, International Federation for Human Rights.) state governments, numerous genocide studies and international law scholars, and other experts.

As of October 2026, at least 74,500 people in Gaza had been killed. The vast majority of the victims were civilians, and around 50% were women and children. Compared to other recent global conflicts, the numbers of known deaths of journalists, humanitarian and health workers, and children are among the highest. Thousands more uncounted bodies are thought to be under the rubble of destroyed buildings. A study in the medical journal The Lancet estimated that traumatic injury deaths were undercounted by June 2024, while noting an even larger potential death toll with indirect deaths included. The number of injured is greater than 174,000. Gaza has the most child amputees per capita in the world; the Gaza war caused more than 21,000 children to be disabled. In July 2025, 18,457 children were listed among the war dead by health authorities in Gaza, excluding indirect deaths and those buried under rubble. Several media critics, including Robin Anderson, accused traditional media of underreporting the killing of children in Gaza; of 1,100 articles studied by Adam Johnson, only two had the word "children" in the headline.

An Israeli blockade heavily contributed to starvation and confirmed famine. In August 2025, about 641,000 people experienced catastrophic levels of food insecurity. Early in the conflict, Israel cut off Gaza's water and electricity. It later partially restored the water. As of October 2025, 94% of Gaza's health centres had been destroyed or damaged. Israel also destroyed numerous cultural heritage sites, including all 12 of Gaza's universities, and 80% of its schools. Over 1.9 million Palestinians—85% of Gaza's population—were forcibly displaced. Israel's bombing has also caused severe environmental devastation across the territory.

In December 2023, the government of South Africa instituted proceedings, South Africa v. Israel, against Israel at the International Court of Justice (ICJ), alleging a violation of the Genocide Convention. In January 2024, the court ordered Israel to take all measures within its power to prevent the commission of acts of genocide, to prevent and punish incitement to genocide, and to allow basic humanitarian service, aid and supplies into Gaza. The court later ordered Israel to increase humanitarian aid into Gaza and to halt its Rafah offensive. Israel did not fully comply with the court's orders. Separately, in November 2024, the International Criminal Court (ICC) issued arrest warrants for Benjamin Netanyahu and Yoav Gallant for war crimes and crimes against humanity. (Note: The charges were the war crimes of starvation of civilians as a weapon of war, willfully causing great suffering or serious injury to body or health, willful killing or murder and intentionally directing attacks against a civilian population, as well as extermination and/or murder, persecution and "other inhumane acts" as crimes against humanity.) In response, the United States imposed sanctions on the ICC in February 2025.

Palestinians have emphasized the relationship between the Gaza genocide and Zionist political violence, describing it as a continuation of the Nakba and its ongoing effects. Israel and its supporters maintain that its actions do not constitute genocide, that they are a response to the October 7 attacks, and that Israel's aim has been to destroy Hamas and free Israeli hostages. (Note: All living captives were released by 13 October 2025. The remains of the last remaining captive were recovered on 26 January 2026.) There is increasing consensus among genocide and international legal scholars on the genocide assessment, although some academics and countries challenge it.

== Background ==
A September 2023 United Nations map of Gaza, showing its border barrier and checkpoints into Israel and Egypt and Israel's Maritime Exclusion Zone, illustrating the geographic scope of the preexisting blockade and the physical constraints on movement and access.

The Israeli occupation of the Gaza Strip began in the 1967 Arab–Israeli War. In 2005, Israel withdrew its ground forces in the context of the Oslo Accords and the Second Intifada. The International Court of Justice subsequently issued an advisory opinion, saying that despite the withdrawal, Israel was still illegally occupying the Gaza Strip due to its blockade of the territory.

Since 2007, the Gaza Strip has been governed by Hamas, an Islamist militant group, while the West Bank remained under the control of the Palestinian Authority. After Hamas took over, Israel intensified its blockade of the Gaza Strip, citing security concerns; international rights groups have called the blockade a form of collective punishment. UNRWA reported that, due to the blockade, 81% of Gazans were living below the poverty level in 2023, with 63% food insecure and dependent on international assistance. Since 2007, Israel and Hamas (and other Palestinian militias in Gaza) have engaged in conflict, including four wars in 2008–2009, 2012, 2014, and 2021.

On 7 October 2023 Hamas led an attack into Israel from Gaza, killing at least 1,139 (Note: A small number of these deaths (it is unclear exactly how many) were a result of friendly fire, including civilians killed by Israeli military fire while attempting to prevent their abduction by armed Palestinians and combatants killed as a result of the Hannibal Directive. There are up to 15 known civilian deaths from these causes: up to 13 in Be'eri, one from helicopter gunfire on a vehicle carrying a hostage, and one in Kibbutz Alumim. According to Ynet, there was an "immense and complex quantity" of friendly-fire incidents on the part of IDF during the 7 October attack, accounting for a fifth of the 105 military deaths then recorded.) people, most of them civilians. The attack included grave acts of violence, including sexual violence. During the attack, Palestinian militant groups abducted 251 people from Israel to the Gaza Strip. Israel responded with a highly destructive bombing campaign followed by an invasion of the Gaza Strip on 27 October.

Hamas officials said the attack was a response to Israeli occupation of the West Bank, desecration of the Al-Aqsa Mosque, the blockade of Gaza, Israeli settler violence against Palestinians, and the detention of thousands of Palestinians, whom Hamas sought to release by taking Israeli hostages. Numerous commentators have identified Israeli occupation as a cause of the war. Several human rights organisations, including Amnesty International, B'Tselem, and Human Rights Watch, have likened the Israeli occupation to apartheid; Israel's supporters dispute this characterisation. A July 2024 advisory opinion by the International Court of Justice affirmed the occupation as illegal and said it violated the International Convention on the Elimination of All Forms of Racial Discrimination.

The Israeli government has said that the military actions it has undertaken are in response to the October 7 attacks and sought to destroy Hamas, overthrow its governance of the Gaza Strip, and free Israeli hostages. It has denied that its military operations constitute genocide. Multiple commentators argue that part of the motive is retaliation for the 7 October attacks. Nimer Sultany argues that anti-Palestinianism is also a motive.

== Definitions of genocide and legal challenges ==
The 1948 United Nations Genocide Convention defines genocide as "any of the following acts committed with intent to destroy, in whole or in part, a national, ethnical, racial or religious group, as such: killing members of the group; causing serious bodily or mental harm to members of the group; deliberately inflicting on the group conditions of life calculated to bring about its physical destruction". The International Court of Justice had never held a state liable for genocide until November 2026, when they found Myanmar guilty of genocide against the Rohingya. The legal threshold for genocidal intent remains a major barrier to prosecution.

Scholars have developed broader sociological and cultural definitions that are distinct from the legal definition under the Genocide Convention. The public perception of what genocide means is also broader than the legal definition. As to the legal definition, there has been scholarly advocacy for expanding or adjusting it, while others seek to adhere to the original intent under the Genocide Convention.

The original definition coined by Raphael Lemkin was broader than that used by the Genocide Convention and included cultural and social destruction. In contrast, orthodox scholarly definitions emphasise actions targeting a group's physical survival. No minimum number of victims or intended victims is required to establish the crime, nor is complete destruction of the group. In the Rohingya genocide case, several states contended that the ICJ should "adopt a balanced approach that recognizes the special gravity of the crime of genocide, without rendering the threshold for inferring genocidal intent so difficult to meet so as to make findings of genocide near-impossible."

== Genocidal intent and incitement ==
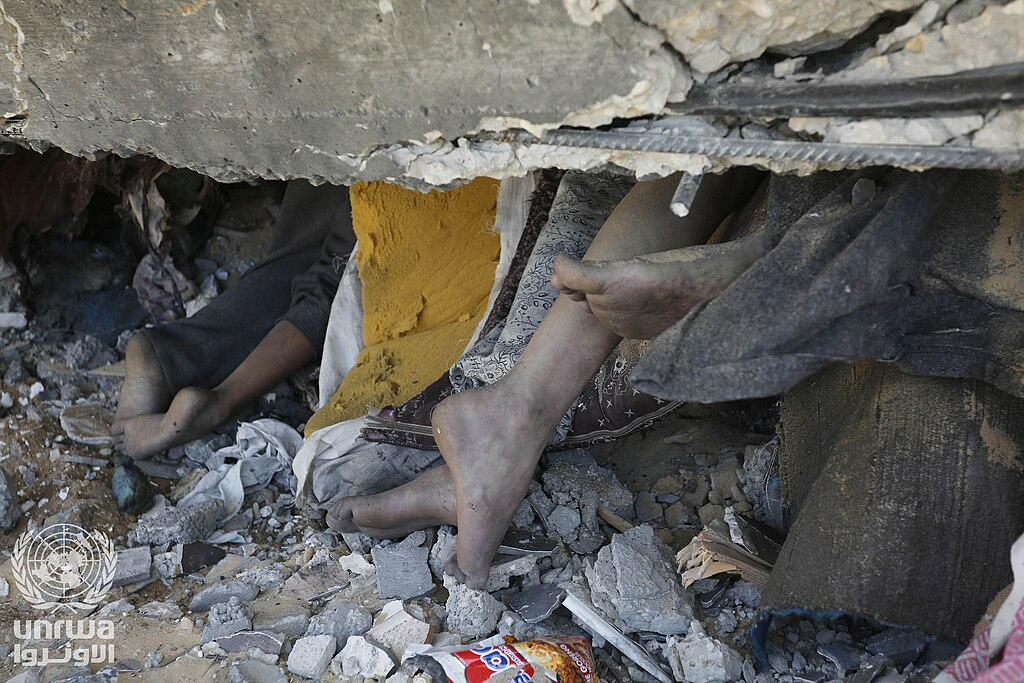
Palestinians under the rubble after Israeli bombing of the Gaza Strip

Experts affirm that statements by Israeli political and military leaders—coupled with eliminationist media rhetoric and Israel's conduct in Gaza—indicate genocidal intent and incitement against the Palestinian people in Gaza. Israeli officials and journalists have made verbal statements that dehumanise Palestinians and incite, justify, or praise atrocities against them as a group. Genocidal intent is also evidenced by the scale and systematic nature of actions that exceed any legitimate military objective—including the extensive targeting of children, widespread sexual violence, destruction of cultural heritage, and imposition of life-destroying conditions—together with the persistence of these practices despite awareness of their catastrophic effects.

"I have ordered a complete siege on the Gaza Strip. There will be no electricity, no food, no fuel, everything is closed. We are fighting human animals, and we are acting accordingly." (Note: Hebrew: ״הוריתי להטיל מצור מוחלט על רצועת עזה. לא יהיה חשמל, לא יהיה מזון, לא יהיה דלק הכל סגור. אנחנו נלחמים בחיות אדם ואנחנו נוהגים בהתאם״)

— Yoav Gallant, Minister of Defense of Israel, on 9 October 2023

Both a United Nations commission of inquiry and Amnesty International documented a "pattern of conduct" by Israeli authorities, concluding that genocidal intent is the "only reasonable inference" that can be drawn from the evidence. Other organisations that have attributed genocidal intent to the actions or statements of Israeli officials include a United Nations panel and Genocide Watch. As part of Defense for Children International – Palestine v. Biden, the historian Barry Trachtenberg said that the rhetoric used by Israeli officials underlies the consensus among genocide historians that the situation in Gaza constitutes genocide. Navi Pillay, the chair of the UN commission of inquiry, compared the statements of Israeli politicians to the genocidal incitement during the Rwandan genocide.

In September 2025, Israeli prime minister Benjamin Netanyahu, president Isaac Herzog, and former defence minister Yoav Gallant were found by a United Nations commission of inquiry to have engaged in "direct and public incitement to commit genocide". Israeli leaders' repeated references to Amalek—the biblical enemy of Israelites whose annihilation is commanded by God—have been considered evidence of genocidal intent by many critics, including South Africa.

== Onset ==
B'Tselem, the South African legal case against Israel, and some scholars who argue Israel is committing genocide give 7 October as its start date. According to B'Tselem, "The genocidal assault on the residents of Gaza, and on all Palestinians as a group, cannot be understood without acknowledging the impact of the 7 October attack on Israeli society. The shock, fear and humiliation elicited by the attack, and the societal upheaval it triggered, served as a driving force for a shift in government policy toward the Palestinians—from oppression and control to destruction and annihilation."

During the first 48 hours of Israel's retaliatory attack, IDF chief Herzi Halevi reported that the IDF attacked 1,000 targets. According to his wife, he told her that "Gaza will be destroyed". Reportedly, Prime Minister Benjamin Netanyahu subsequently said he wanted 5,000 targets to be attacked, even though the IDF had not confirmed 5,000 enemy targets. Artificial intelligence was used to generate a list of targets, in many cases based on unconfirmed or outdated intelligence. About 10,000 Palestinians were killed in a month, including entire families. Shmuel Lederman called this "as criminal as it gets". Martin Shaw and A. Dirk Moses argue that this "front-loaded violence" makes it harder to argue that the genocide began after the initial Israeli attack on Gaza.

On 13 October 2023, the historian Raz Segal said Israel was committing a "textbook case of genocide". He was one of the first scholars to do so. Others argue that the war was initially legitimate and the genocide started later, in 2024 or 2025. In September 2024, a UN Special Committee concluded, "the policies and practices of Israel during the reporting period [i.e. October 2023 to July 2024] are consistent with the characteristics of genocide."

== Genocidal acts ==
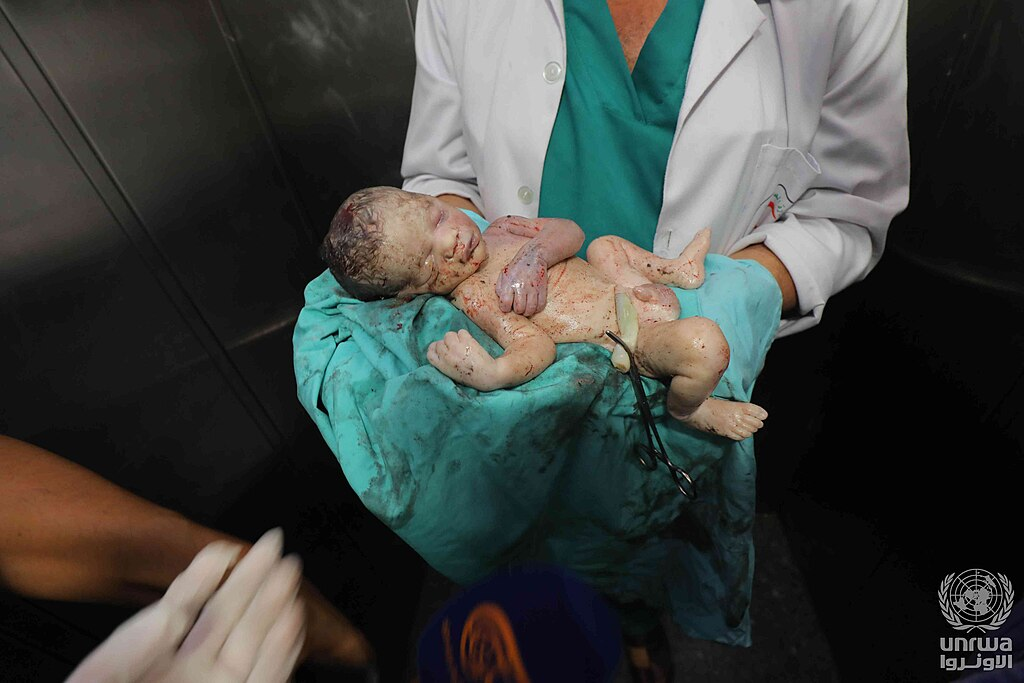
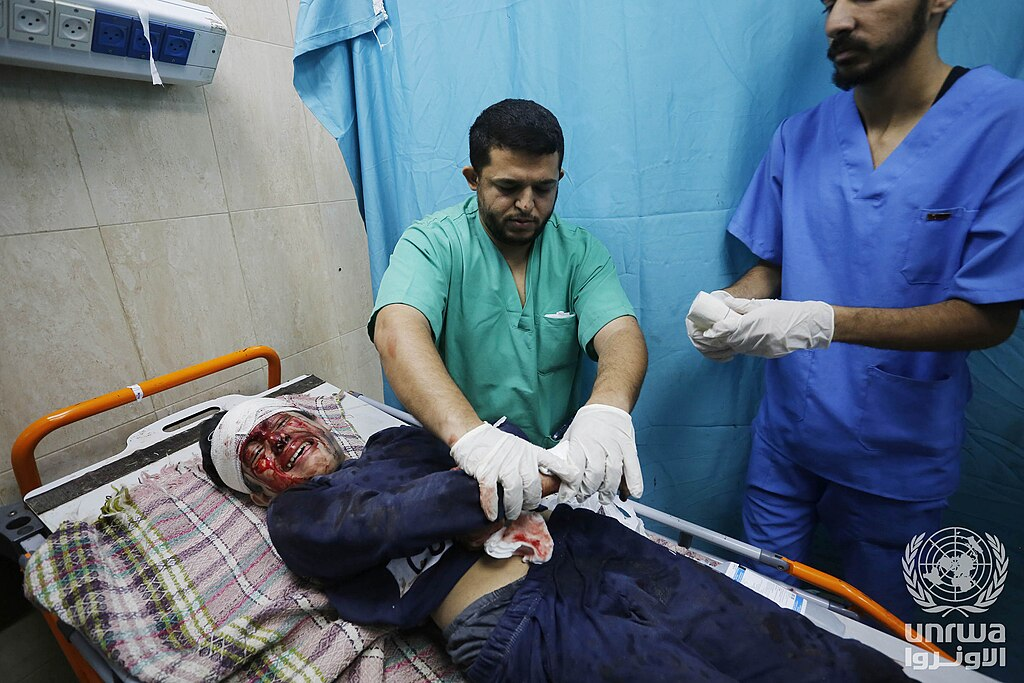
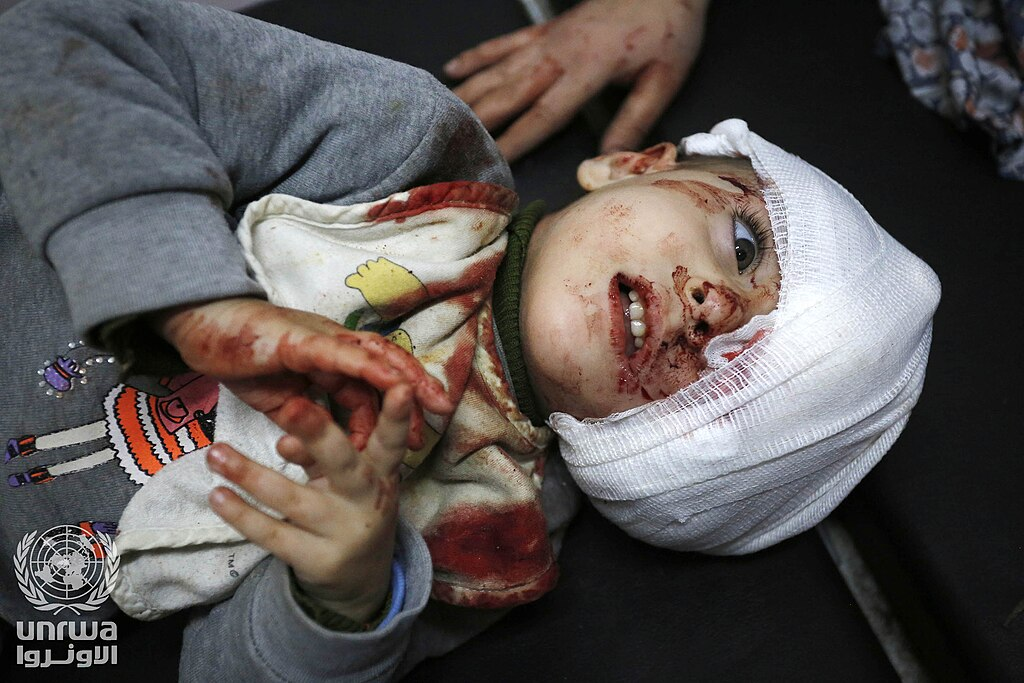
Clockwise from top:
- A newborn baby killed as a result of an Israeli airstrike
- Palestinians injured by an Israeli airstrike in Deir el-Balah, Gaza Strip
- Video interviews conducted with several survivors of October 2023 Israeli airstrikes
- An injured child receives treatment at Al-Aqsa Martyrs Hospital after Israeli airstrike in the Nuseirat refugee camp, Gaza Strip

=== Mass killings and physical harm ===
==== Direct killings ====
UN experts and human rights organisations have characterised Israel's actions in Gaza as extermination, a crime against humanity that involves "the act of killing on a large scale". During the first two months of bombing, Israel dropped 25,000 tonnes of explosives on the Gaza Strip. Many of these were unguided bombs dropped in densely populated areas, obliterating entire neighbourhoods. Since 7 October 2023, the IDF has been accused of extrajudicial killing of unarmed Palestinians and healthcare personnel. Israeli soldiers have killed Palestinian civilians, with a December 2023 UN report stating that they allegedly shot them in front of their families. In January 2024, Israeli soldiers shot at civilians waving white flags, killing one. Doctors have identified numerous Palestinian children with single gunshot wounds to the head and chest, consistent with intentional targeting by Israeli forces.

In April 2024, mass graves were found containing over 300 corpses, allegedly including older people, women and wounded, and others with their hands tied. The IDF said accusations that it caused the killings were "baseless and unfounded", and that during its operation "in the area of Nasser Hospital, in accordance to the effort to locate hostages and missing persons, corpses buried by Palestinians in the area of Nasser Hospital were examined." It added, "Bodies examined, which did not belong to Israeli hostages, were returned to their place."

At least 14,000 Palestinians had been killed in Gaza by December 2023. In late 2024, a study limited only to those fatalities confirmed by at least three independent sources, and only from November 2023 to April 2024 (about 8,100 people), corroborated previous reports by the UN and news outlets that 70% of fatalities were women and children. (Note: Per the Gaza Health Ministry and Government Information Office by 3 January 2024, over 22,300 people had been confirmed dead.) As of 31 August 2024, data from the Ministry of Health (only for those of the dead who were fully identified, about 34,000 people at the time) showed that 60% of those killed were women, children, and the elderly. Eleven months later (31 July 2025) the number of those of the dead who were fully identified reached 60,199, 52.6% of whom were women, children, and the elderly. (Note: 47.4% were non-elderly men, 30.7% were children, 17.1% were non-elderly women, 3.0% were elderly men and 1.9% were elderly women.)

By 14 January 2024, over 23,900 Gazans had been confirmed killed. By 10 May, deaths had topped 35,000, a third of them unidentified, with over 10,000 more estimated to be buried under the rubble. Within the first three weeks, the Israeli assault killed more children in Gaza than were killed worldwide across all conflict zones in any year since 2019. Over 52,000 people had been wounded by December 2023, and by May 2024 this number had risen to over 77,700. As of 10 October 2025, the Gaza Health Ministry reports that at least 67,194 Gazans were killed, which is between 3% and 4% of Gaza's total population.

+972 Magazine and Local Call reported that the IDF decided early in the war to authorise killing up to 15 to 20 civilians per low-ranking militant, while for a senior militant killing more than 100 civilians was authorised. According to six Israeli intelligence officers, a major factor in the high death toll is the military's practice of striking targets in their homes with their families present, chosen partly because automated intelligence systems make those residences easier to identify. Another intelligence officer said that in targeting junior militants, Israel used only dumb bombs, which can destroy entire buildings, to not "waste expensive bombs on unimportant people".

In March 2024, Haaretz reported that some Israeli commanders had set up "kill zones" in which soldiers were commanded to kill anyone on sight, even if they were unarmed. According to an Israeli officer, "in practice, a terrorist is anyone the IDF has killed in the areas in which its forces operate." (Note: In the original Hebrew article the Haaretz reporter used the term "Extermination Zones" (שטחי ההשמדה, Shtachei Hashmada) instead of the English version term "Kill Zone".) The 2026 documentary NAZA corroborated this report. In it, an Israeli soldier tells the filmmakers that his unit killed hundreds of unarmed civilians for entering the zones and recorded all of them as combatants. A Channel 13 investigation into the IDF's mistaken shooting of three hostages reported that soldiers of the Golani Brigade had received "an unequivocal order" to kill everyone they encountered in Gaza. One soldier was quoted as saying: "even if they're civilians, you shoot to kill". In June, the Associated Press found that Israel's campaign in Gaza was killing entire bloodlines of Palestinians to a "degree never seen before". According to testimony given to the Israeli Knesset, Israeli soldiers driving armoured bulldozers had been ordered to "run over terrorists, dead and alive, in the hundreds".

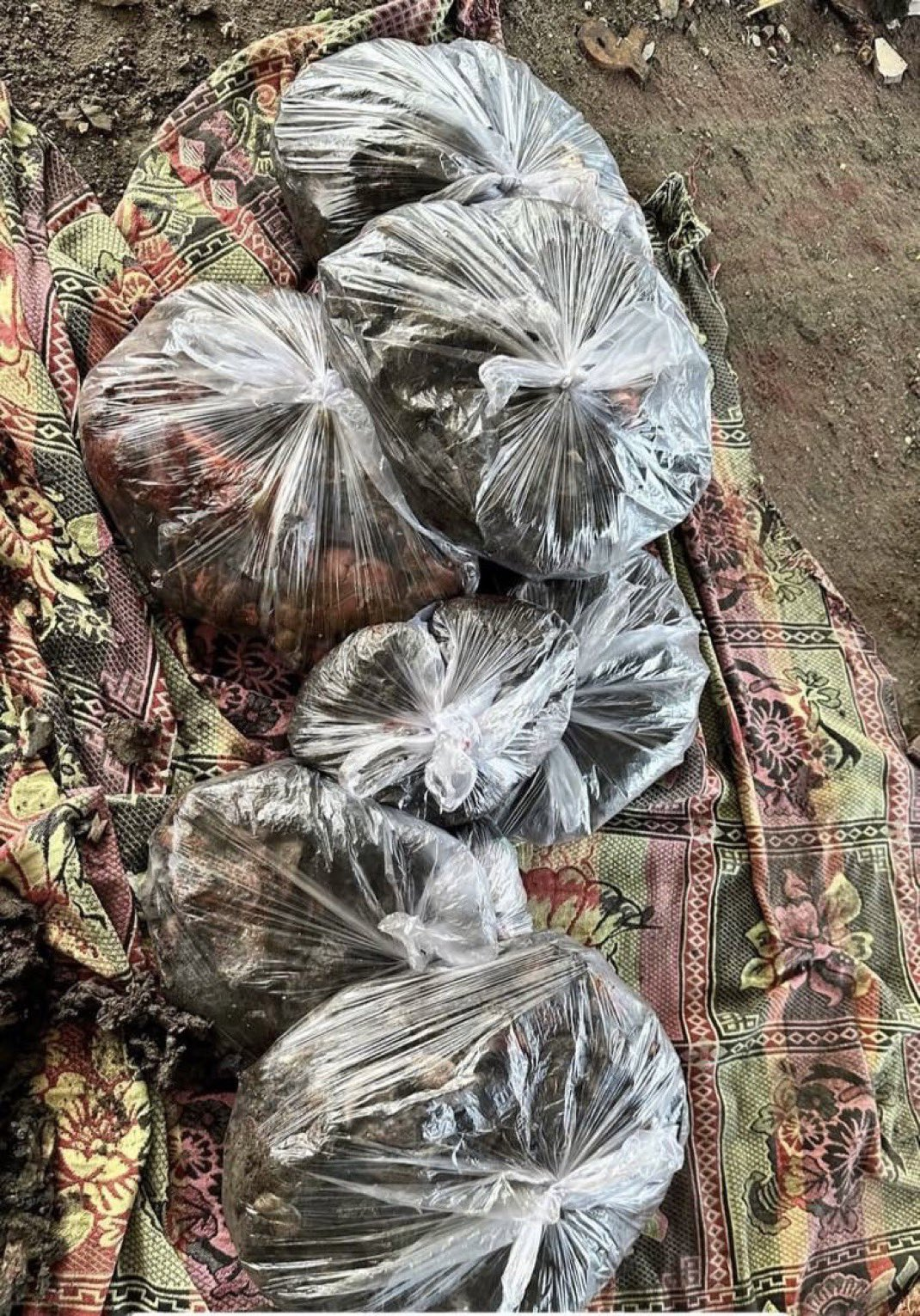
Bags of burned, dismembered limbs, called ashlaa (أشلاء) in Arabic, from the 10 August 2024 Israeli airstrike on the Al-Tabaeen School, which was sheltering displaced Palestinians

The proportion of women and children among the dead is disputed, but the names, gender, and age of 60,000+ of the victims are known and published. On 8 May 2024, total deaths quoted by the UN were 34,844, of which 24,686 are fully identified: 52% women and children, 8% elderly of all genders, and 40% men. In November 2024, the UN published an analysis covering 8,119 fatalities that were verified by at least three independent sources, between November 2023 and April 2024, with 70% of them women and children. As of 31 August 2024, per the Gaza Ministry of Health, the number of fatalities had risen to 40,691, 34,344 identified by name: 17,652 (51%) women and children, 2,955 (9%) elderly of all genders (defined as those aged 60 or older), and 13,737 (40%) men. A year later (31 July 2025), per the Gaza Ministry of Health, the number of fatalities identified by name reached 60,199: 28,728 (48%) were women and children, 2,928 (5%) were elderly of all genders (defined as those aged 65 or older), and 28,543 (47%) were men. A minimum of 18,457 children had been killed since October 2023.

In November 2024, the Gaza Health Ministry reported that 1,410 Gazan families had been completely erased from the civil registry as a result of Israeli bombings. Data collection has become increasingly difficult for the Gaza Health Ministry due to the destruction of infrastructure. The ministry has had to supplement its usual reporting based on hospital dead with other sources of information, including reports by the media and first responders as well as families and widows, who must formally register their husbands' deaths to qualify for government assistance. Professor Michael Spagat found an urgent need for a transparent methodology to reconcile its top-line death numbers—34,535 as of 30 April 2024—with its detailed breakdowns, including only those of the dead who were fully identified, summing to 24,653 on the same date. By August 2025, this gap between the number of victims and the number of fully identified vicitms became smaller (about 62,000 vs. about 60,000), as more victims were identified. The ministry's figures for the total number killed have been contested by Israeli authorities but accepted as accurate by Israeli intelligence services, the UN, and the World Health Organization. More recently, The Guardian has reported that a classified IDF database registered 8,900 killed militants. This and GHM's data imply a civilian death rate of 83%, which exceeds that of any conflict since 1989 except the Rwandan genocide, the Siege of Mariupol, and the Siege of Srebrenica. The IDF denied this, saying the figures were inaccurate and inconsistent with its data.

A 2025 paper on the Gaza war estimated 64,260 deaths from traumatic injury between October 2023 and 30 June 2024, and likely exceeding 70,000 by October 2024, with 59.1% being women, children and the elderly. It concluded that the GHM undercounted trauma-related deaths by 41% in its report, and also noted that its findings "underestimate the full impact of the military operation in Gaza, as they do not account for non-trauma-related deaths resulting from health service disruption, food insecurity, and inadequate water and sanitation." A comparable estimate for traumatic injury deaths was around 80,000 for January 2025. A February study in The Lancet estimated that life expectancy in the Gaza Strip between October 2023 and September 2024 decreased by 34.9 years, excluding indirect deaths. The study also used census and registration data to assess the reliability of the Gaza Health Ministry's death count, and found no substantial errors.

In May 2025, finance minister Bezalel Smotrich claimed that Israel was targeting Hamas's civilian workers, saying, "We're eliminating ministers, bureaucrats, money handlers—everyone who holds up Hamas's civilian rule." Killing civilian members of Hamas is in itself illegal. Starting in June 2025, IDF soldiers said they were ordered to shoot at crowds of Palestinians near Gaza Humanitarian Foundation aid sites, killing over 1,000 people. Amnesty International alleged Israel was trying to restrict aid to starve and inflict genocide upon the Palestinians. In November 2025, a study by the Max Planck Institute for Demographic Research estimated that the total number of violent deaths in Gaza was between 100,000 and 126,000, of which 27% were children under 15 years old, and 24% women. Amnesty International and B'Tselem asserted the genocide continued during the ceasefire, partly citing the continued killing of Palestinians. Between the start of the ceasefire in October 2025 and June 2026, Israel killed over 1,000 people, including at least 265 children.

According to a June 2026 UN commission report, Israel deliberately killed Palestinian children during the ‌war and after the October 2025 ceasefire, making up around 30% of those killed in Gaza overall, and this was a key element in establishing Israel's genocidal intent in Gaza. On October 26, 2026, the UN Commission of Inquiry announced that Israel had continued to commit genocidal acts after the October 2025 ceasefire, aimed at the total or partial destruction of the Palestinians in Gaza. The commission also reported that Israeli forces used heavy munitions, drones, quadcopters, and snipers in densely populated areas during the ceasefire, and that the Yellow Line, which was designated as the temporary ceasefire border, had advanced farther into Gaza.

According to an Al Jazeera Arabic investigation based on witness testimonies and expert analysis, there are nearly 3,000 Palestinians dead without recoverable remains, believed to be connected to Israeli forces' use of US-supplied thermal and thermobaric munitions in Gaza.

In October 2026, the German newspaper Der Spiegel published the testimonies of ten Israeli soldiers who had been deployed in Gaza. The soldiers recalled being ordered by their superiors to kill all Arab men of fighting age whether or not they were armed, (Note: According to one of the interviewees, a conscript known as Itay, the IDF's definition of a military-age male "was interpreted very openly. This could mean between sixteen and sixty years, but also below or above". Itay said IDF soldiers were sometimes permitted to kill women and children in addition to men of fighting age, depending on which unit they served in.) and that this policy had resulted in widespread killings of civilians by the IDF. Several of them said that once the IDF had evacuated an area of Gaza, they were permitted to kill anyone they encountered, regardless of whether they posed an immediate threat. One interviewee, known by the alias "Yaakov", said that many of the supposed combatants the IDF claimed to have killed were actually civilians. Yaakov estimated that while stationed at the Netzarim Corridor his brigade had killed between 160 and 170 people, only one of whom was armed, and recorded all of them as terrorists. He also said the IDF used a tactic known as the "straw widower", which entailed ambushing and killing civilians in areas that had not yet been evacuated, and that these deaths were also recorded as combatants.

==== Indirect deaths ====
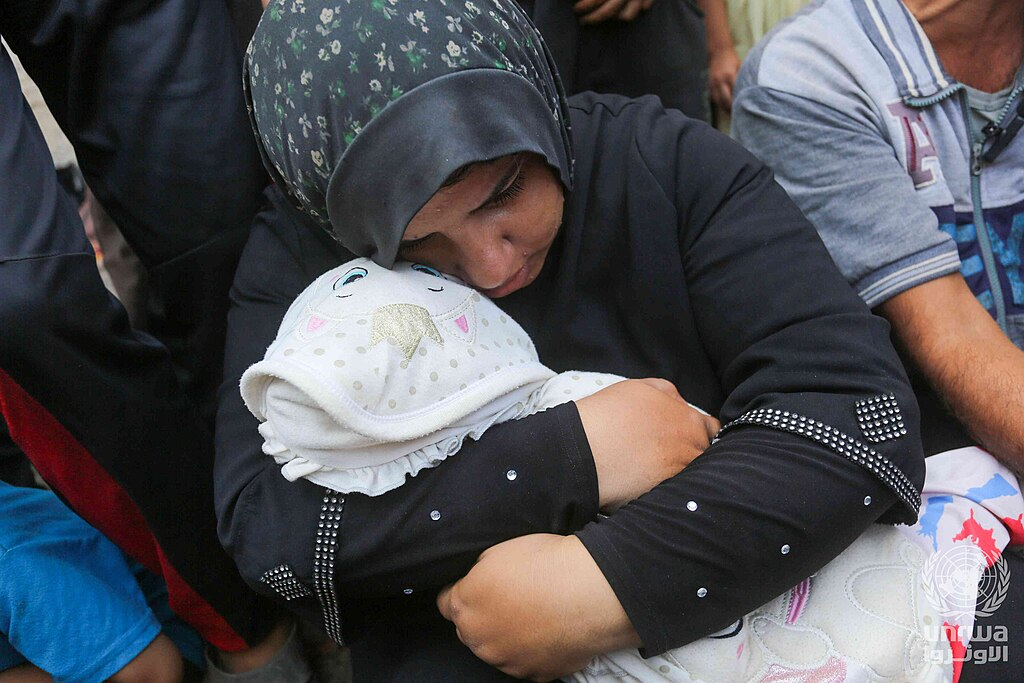
Mother cries for her 4-year-old daughter, who died due to malnutrition and lack of treatment

Rasha Khatib, Martin McKee, and Salim Yusuf published an estimate of the number of deaths, directly or indirectly caused by the conflict, that by July 2024 had already occurred or would occur in the coming months and years. Indirect Palestinian deaths from disease are expected to be much higher due to the intensity of the conflict, destruction of healthcare infrastructure, lack of food, water, shelter, and safe places for civilians to flee, and reduction in UNRWA funding. They estimated that the total conflict-related deaths in Gaza will likely be four to 16 times higher than the reported death toll. By multiplying the reported deaths by five, they argued that "186,000 or even more deaths could be attributable to the current conflict in Gaza". Michael Spagat wrote that their estimate "lacks a solid foundation and is implausible", but it was "fair to call attention to the fact that not all of the deaths are going to be direct violent ones", and has called the death toll in Gaza "staggeringly high". Donald Bloxham also notes that most deaths have been "indirect deaths" in various wars and that the "systematic obstruction of supplies into Gaza" is an Israeli policy, which makes calling these deaths "indirect" incorrect.

An October 2024 letter by US healthcare workers who had served in Gaza since 7 October 2023 tried to estimate the number of Gazans who had died of starvation based on publicly available IPC reports. It said the most conservative estimate was that at least 62,413 people in Gaza had died from starvation, most of them young children; this estimate was based on the assumption that catastrophic (level 5) food insecurity results in a death rate of at least 2 deaths per 10,000 people per day. (Note: Per the IPC manual, the starvation death rate does not have to be that high (at least 2 deaths per 10,000 people per day) to declare catastrophic (level 5) food insecurity, but it does need to be that high to declare famine.) The physicians also estimated that at least 5,000 people had died from lack of access to care for chronic diseases. The indirect death estimates in two studies reviewed by The Economist implied that the life expectancy in Gaza has fallen by 35 years, rivalling the Rwandan genocide in absolute terms.

==== Serious bodily and mental harm ====
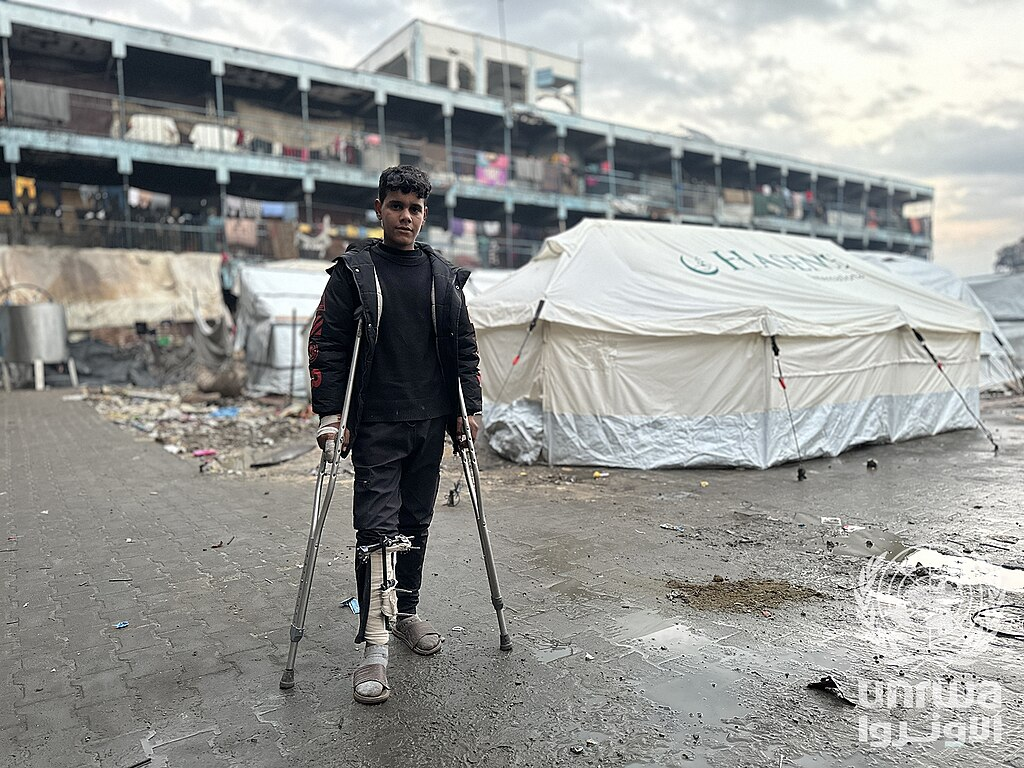
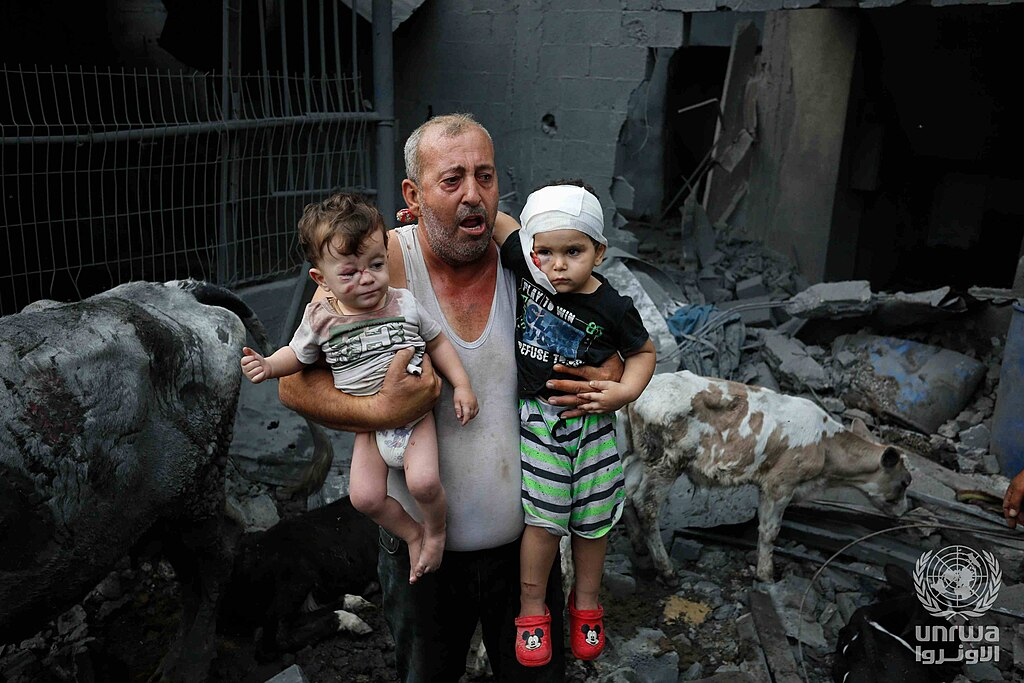
Top to bottom:
- Yamen was injured in his leg during his sixth displacement in Jabalia refugee camp, and he was forced to flee while wounded.
- A Palestinian refugee carries his injured grandchildren from the Israeli bombing of Nuseirat Camp, Gaza Strip

The number of injured since 7 October 2023 due to Israeli military actions is greater than 174,000, and Gaza has the most child amputees per capita worldwide. In the same period over 1,040 Palestinians have been killed in the West Bank.

By March 2024, an estimated 17,000 children were "wounded child, no surviving family" (WCNSF), a new medical term. According to a UN committee, the Gaza war has resulted in disabilities for more than 21,000 children as of September 2025.

Dr. Mark Perlmutter, who served as a volunteer at the European Hospital in Khan Yunis, said in an interview with Democracy Now! on April 11, 2024 that 70% to 75% of the patients operated on there were young children, some of whom were targeted with deliberate shots to the forehead and abdomen.

As of 25 August 2024, the UN estimates that most of Gaza's 2.2 million people are confined to roughly 15 square miles (39 km^{2}), causing a critical lack of basic services, like clean water, and diseases spreading widely, such as Hepatitis C.

==== Torture and sexual violence ====
Israel has been accused of indiscriminate mass detentions while prisoners said they were threatened with mutilation, death, arson, and rape, and torturing Palestinians detained without charges.

In August 2024, the UN OHCHR reported receiving testimony from Palestinians imprisoned at Sde Teiman detention camp about rape and sexual assault perpetrated on detainees. The Lemkin Institute considers this and similar reports to be indicative of "Sexualized Violence During Genocide", or sexual violence being used to destroy a group.

Amnesty International reported that the pattern of abuses inside Israeli prisons "underscores the systematic dehumanization and mental and physical abuse of Palestinians in Gaza and may also be taken into account with a view to inferring genocidal intent from pattern of conduct." According to the Independent International Commission of Inquiry, gender-based and sexual violence were committed "to dominate, oppress and destroy the Palestinian people in whole or in part."

A report by UN Special Rapporteur Francesca Albanese called Israel's torture of Palestinians "a structural feature of the ongoing genocide and broader settler-colonial apartheid." According to Albanese, torture occurs both in Israeli prisons and in the entirety of occupied Palestine through "mass displacement, siege, denial of aid and food, unrestrained military and settler violence and pervasive surveillance and terror".

=== Starvation, displacement, and destruction of living conditions ===
==== Starvation and blockade ====
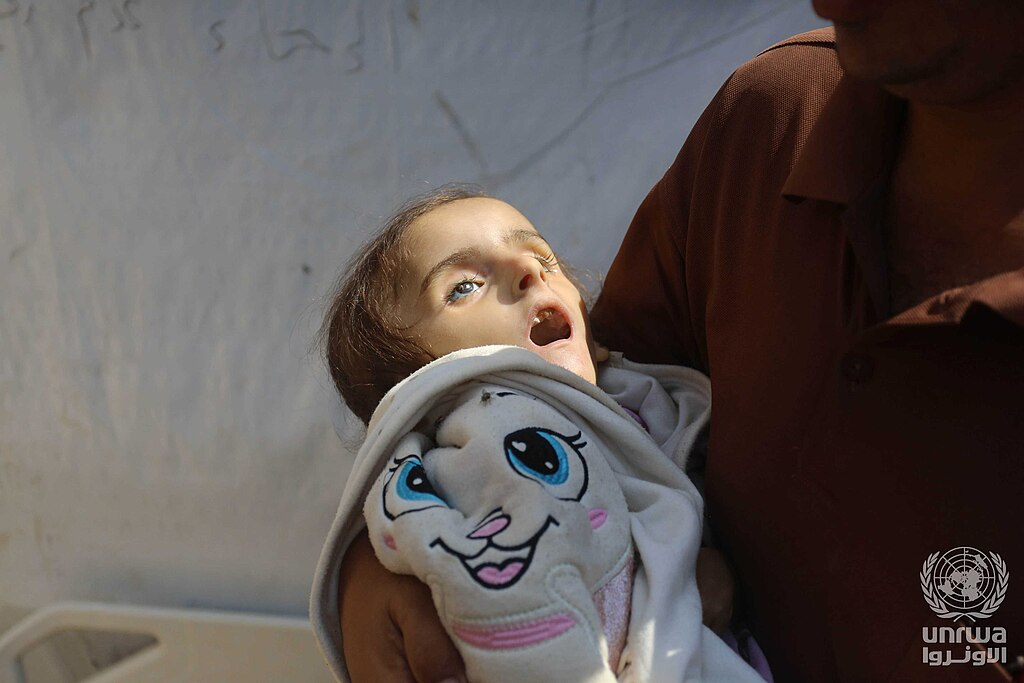
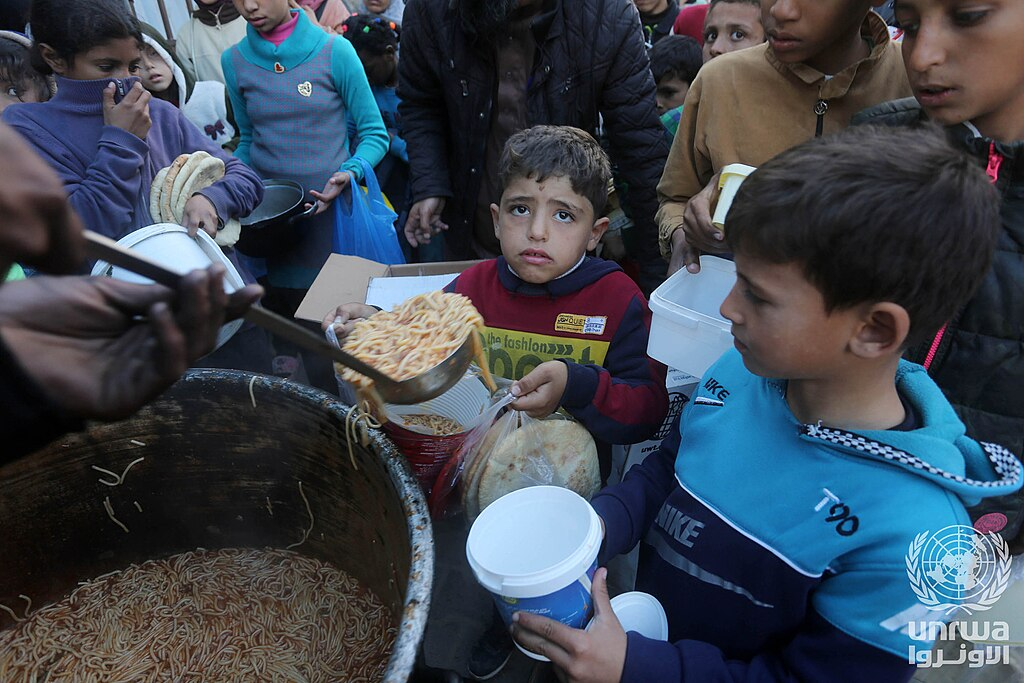
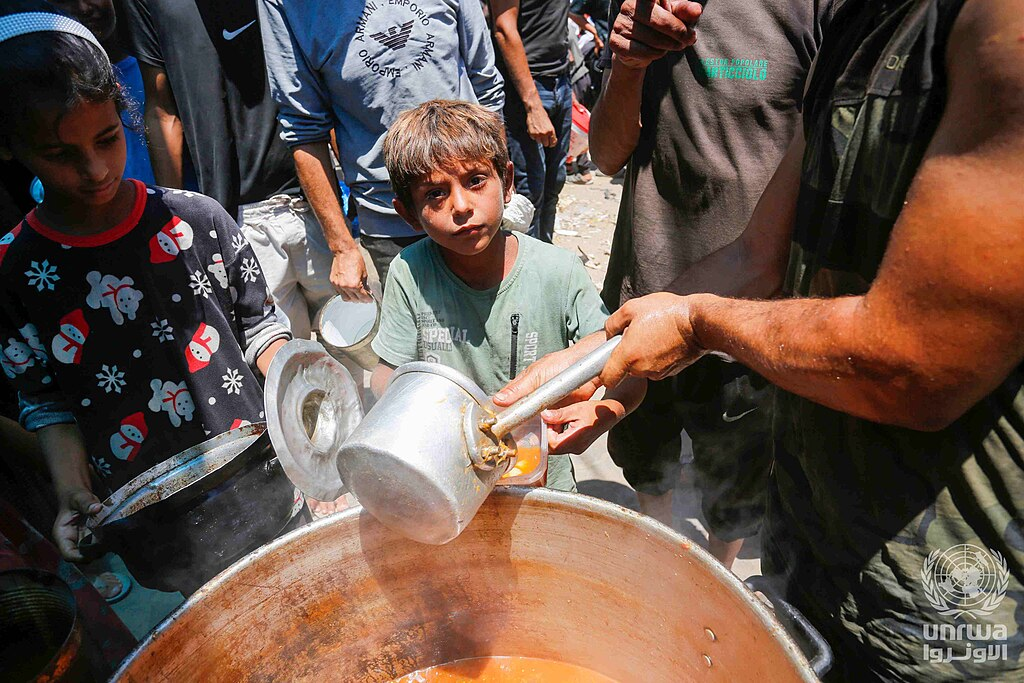
Clockwise from top:
- A four-year-old Palestinian girl who died due to malnutrition and lack of treatment
- Displaced Palestinians gather to receive food from a charity in Deir el-Balah, Gaza Strip
- Displaced Palestinians receive food from charitable Tekiya during Ramadan in Deir el-Balah, Gaza Strip

In February 2024, Human Rights Watch and Amnesty International both released statements declaring Israel had failed to comply with the ICJ's 26 January ruling to prevent genocide by blocking aid from entering Gaza. A Refugees International report found that Israel had "consistently and groundlessly impeded aid operations within Gaza". The historian Melanie Tanielian argues that starvation and blockade should be foregrounded as methods of genocide alongside mass bombing. In an April report, B'Tselem called the unfolding famine "the product of a deliberate and conscious Israeli policy". Elyse Semerdjian characterised Israel's actions as genocide by attrition.

In October 2023, the World Food Programme warned of Gaza's dwindling food supply, and in December, alongside the UN, it reported that more than half of Gaza's population was "starving", fewer than one in ten were eating every day, and 48% were suffering "extreme hunger". Palestinian Foreign Minister Riyad al-Maliki referred to "Israel's deliberate use of starvation as a weapon of war against the people it occupied"; an Israeli official called the charge "blood-libellous" and "delusional". In December 2023, Human Rights Watch found that Israel was using starvation as a weapon of war by deliberately denying access to food and water. In January 2024, UN experts accused Israel of "destroying Gaza's food system and using food as a weapon against the Palestinian people". In February 2024, finance minister Bezalel Smotrich personally blocked US-funded shipments of flour from entering Gaza, in violation of promises Israel had made to the US government.

In early 2024, the United Nations special rapporteur on the right to food Michael Fakhri said that Israel is "culpable" of genocide because "Israel has announced its intention to destroy the Palestinian people, in whole or in part, simply for being Palestinian" and because Israel was denying food to Palestinians by halting humanitarian aid and "intentionally" destroying

small-scale fishing vessels, greenhouses and orchards in Gaza ... We have never seen a civilian population made to go so hungry so quickly and so completely, that is the consensus among starvation experts. Israel is not just targeting civilians, it is trying to damn the future of the Palestinian people by harming their children.

After the ICJ ruling, the number of aid trucks Israel allowed into Gaza dropped by 40%. In the ICJ's March reaffirmation of provisional measures, the court highlighted the "unprecedented levels of food insecurity experienced by Palestinians in the Gaza Strip over recent weeks, as well as the increasing risks of epidemics", acknowledging that since the Court's January order there had been a "lack of Israeli compliance" resulting in "the catastrophic living conditions" deteriorating further.

In March 2024, 12 Israeli human rights organisations signed an open letter accusing Israel of failing to abide by the ICJ ruling to prevent genocide by facilitating the delivery of humanitarian aid. In April the UN special rapporteur on the right to health Tlaleng Mofokeng said Israel was "killing and causing irreparable harm against Palestinian civilians with its bombardments", adding, "They are also knowingly and intentionally imposing famine" and accusing Israel of "genocide".

In October 2024, Israel had reportedly adopted a modified version of the Generals' Plan. (Note: Some Israeli officials denied the plan had been adopted; however, an official familiar with the situation stated that some aspects of the plan were already in progress.) The proposed plan included orders for all residents of northern Gaza to leave within a week; a full siege on water, food, and fuel; and then the arrest or killing of all who remained. By mid-October 2024, Israel had ordered the evacuation of northern Gaza and prevented the entry of humanitarian aid for almost two weeks. According to Stephen Devereux, avoidable deaths due to starvation as a result of Israeli policies "almost certainly constitutes a war crime and a crime against humanity".

On 21 November 2024, the International Criminal Court issued arrest warrants for Israeli Prime Minister Benjamin Netanyahu and the former defence minister Yoav Gallant, asserting that the two "bear criminal responsibility for the war crime of starvation as a method of warfare".

Israel lifted restrictions on aid into Gaza in January–February 2025 during the first stage of the January ceasefire. But on 2 March, Israel announced that all humanitarian aid would be blocked indefinitely unless Hamas agreed to alter the terms of the ceasefire deal, which Hamas refused to do. Within four days, food supplies in Gaza had rapidly depleted while the price of food had more than doubled. Aid agencies such as Oxfam and UNICEF warned of mass starvation if the aid freeze continued. Oxfam policy lead Bushra Khalidi predicted "the total collapse of systems that sustain life". Lawyer Salah Abdel-Ati said Israel's actions were illegal under the Geneva Conventions, which prohibits the destruction or withholding of essentials such as food in combat zones.

In May 2025, after blocking the import of all food, medicine, and fuel for two and a half months, Netanyahu announced that Israel would allow "minimal humanitarian aid" into Gaza due to international pressure. Israel has proposed using private companies to distribute aid to the south of Gaza only. The plan is backed by the US, which has created the Gaza Humanitarian Foundation (GHF) to deliver aid without "Hamas stealing, looting or leveraging this assistance for its own ends". The United Nations aid chief Tom Fletcher criticised the plan, saying it "forces further displacement" and "makes aid conditional on political and military aims". Numerous Palestinians have been killed by Israeli forces while approaching GHF aid distribution points.

In August 2025, it was reported that Israel planned to surge aid to other parts of Gaza while cutting off all aid to Gaza City to force residents to evacuate while Israel takes over the city. As of August 2025, projections show the entire population is experiencing "high levels of acute food insecurity", with about 641,000 people experiencing catastrophic levels. The IPC confirmed famine is taking place in the Gaza Governorate.

Two weeks after the October 2025 ceasefire came into effect, dozens of NGOs, including the Norwegian Refugee Council and Doctors Without Borders, announced that Israel was arbitrarily blocking their shipments of aid to Gaza. World Health Organisation head Tedros Adhanom Ghebreyesus said, "the situation still remains catastrophic because what's entering is not enough" and "there is no dent in hunger because there is not enough food".

By December 2025, the food situation improved, with famine and catastrophic food insecurity (level 5) no longer happening; but 27% of the population still experienced emergency-level food insecurity (level 4) and another 50% of the population experienced crisis-level food insecurity (level 3). At the turn of the year, Israel's expulsion of Doctors Without Borders and several other humanitarian organizations from Gaza raised fears that the effects of malnutrition on the population would not be adequately treated or monitored; these organizations helped alleviate effects of famine/malnutrition by treating children with severe acute malnutrition. Israel has also continued blocking certain medical aid.

After the outbreak of the 2026 Iran war in February, Israel reimposed several restrictions on Gaza. It closed multiple aid crossings and suspended United Nations humanitarian movements and rotations, the return of people to Gaza, and medical evacuations.

==== Forced displacement ====
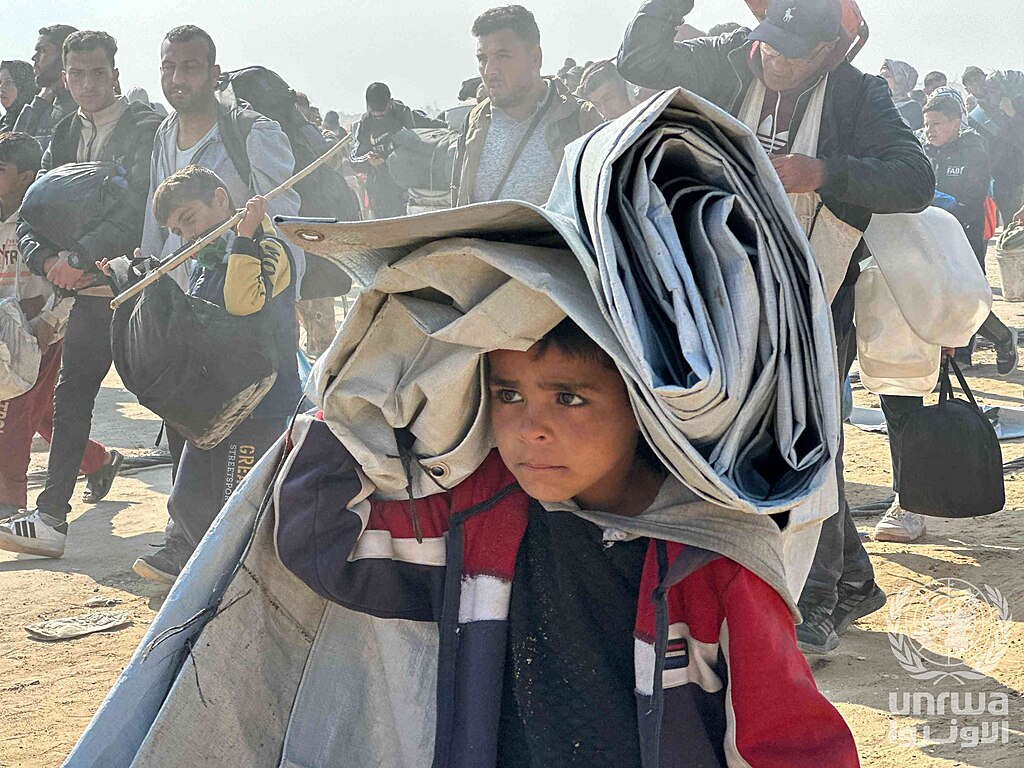
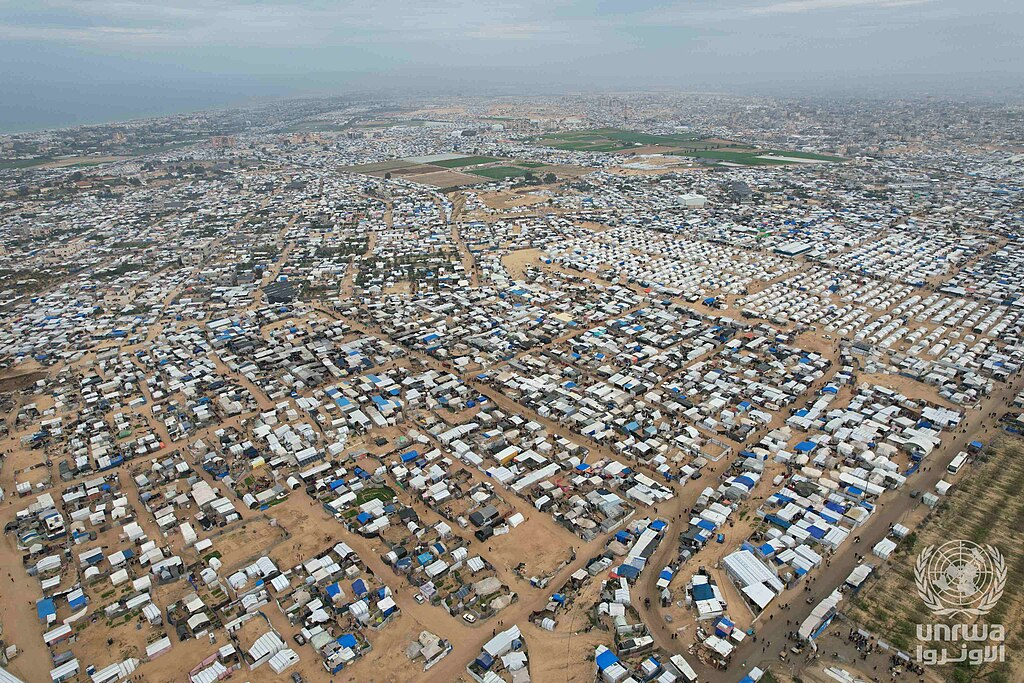
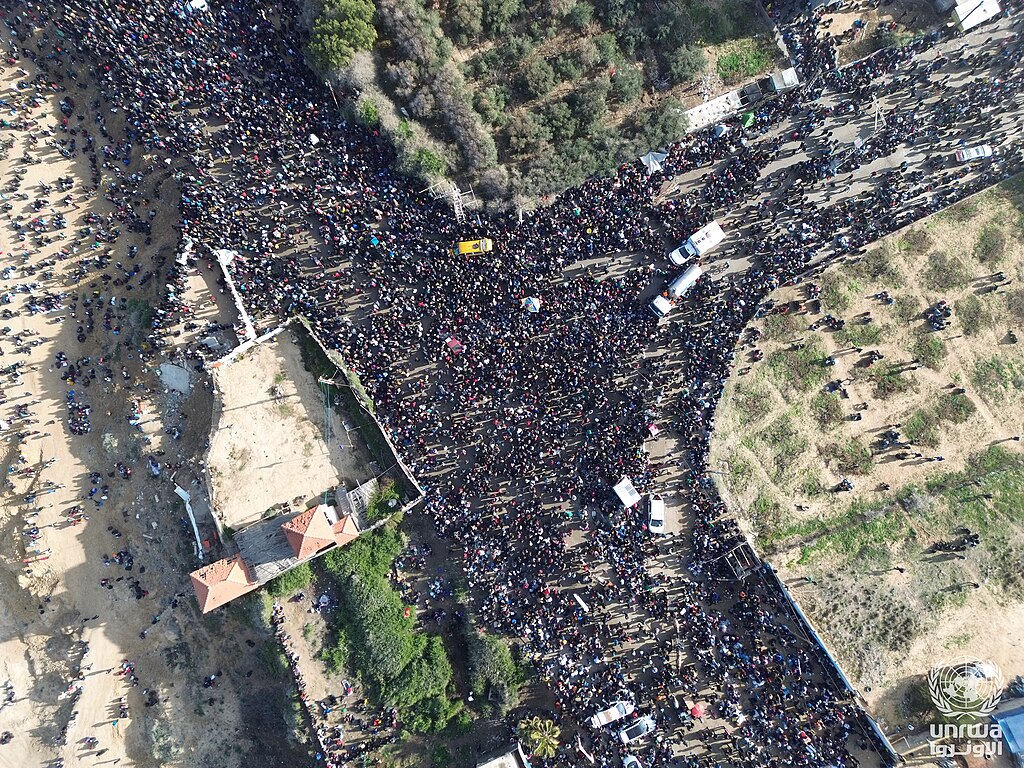
Clockwise from top:
- Return of displaced people via Al-Rasheed Street after ceasefire, January 2025, Gaza Strip
- An aerial photo of displaced Palestinians waiting in northern Nuseirat to return to their homes in Gaza
- An aerial view of Al-Mawasi area where displaced Palestinians live in tents, Gaza Strip

Since October 2023, Israel's evacuation orders have displaced 1.9 million people—nearly Gaza's entire population—through unclear, inconsistent directives, often issued amid bombings, leaving civilians with no safe routes or destinations. Humanitarian zones were repeatedly attacked, while Israel blocked aid and destroyed infrastructure, leading to starvation and uninhabitable conditions. Senior Israeli officials openly declared intentions to reduce Gaza's territory and push Palestinians out, reinforcing policies of ethnic cleansing and permanent displacement. Human Rights Watch reported that Israel's systematic forced displacement of Palestinians in Gaza amounts to war crimes and crimes against humanity. South Africa and others criticised the Gaza Strip evacuations as a key component of the genocide. B'Tselem mentions statements by Israeli high-ranking officials that a "central objective of the war" was ethnic cleansing.

On 6 October 2024, Israel designated northern Gaza as a combat zone and ordered the civilian population to evacuate. Both Israeli military analysts and the Al Mezan Center for Human Rights alleged that this was the first stage of the "Generals' Plan", a policy proposed by the former Israeli general Giora Eiland to force Palestinians out of Gaza. The UN Human Rights Office said that Israel may have caused the "destruction of the Palestinian population in Gaza's northernmost governorate through death and displacement."

During the January 2025 ceasefire, displaced persons were able to return to their homes in northern Gaza. After Israel broke the ceasefire in March 2025, displacement orders resumed. The 2025 Gaza City offensive led to further evacuation orders for 1.2 million people. From the start of the war to the end of 2025, about 100,000 people fled the Gaza Strip. Combined with deaths, this resulted in a 6% decline in the territory's population.

==== Ecocide ====
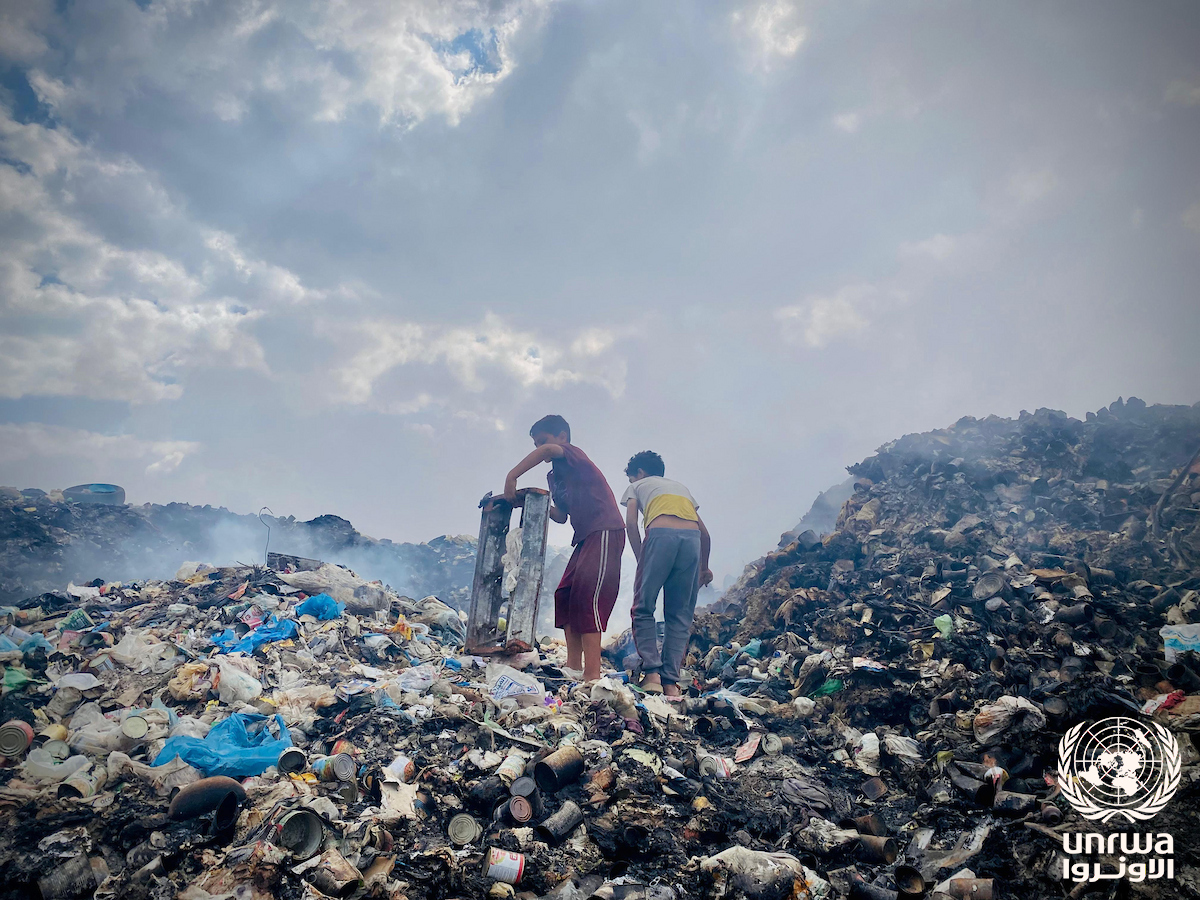
Waste has accumulated near populated areas across Gaza, posing environmental and health risks.

Israel's bombing in Gaza caused severe environmental devastation, destroying vegetation, water, sanitation, and waste infrastructure and contaminating air, soil, and water. The UN and environmental groups report damage consistent with "ecocide", citing massive debris, untreated sewage, and toxic pollution. These conditions have triggered disease outbreaks, respiratory illnesses, and long-term health risks. Multiple commentators have argued that deliberate ecocide is a central component of Israel's genocide in Gaza. Scholars have argued that the destruction of the environment sustaining a population—including its water, land, and food systems—constitutes a genocidal act, as it inflicts conditions of life calculated to destroy the group, in whole or in part. (Note: Article II of the Genocide Convention defines genocide as "any of the following acts committed with intent to destroy, in whole or in part, a national, ethnical, racial or religious group" through acts such as (a) murder, (b) inflicting serious bodily or mental harm, (c) inflicting conditions of life calculated to destroy the group, (d) imposing measures intended to prevent births, and (e) forcibly transferring children of the group to another group.)

==== Deliberate destruction of civilian infrastructure ====
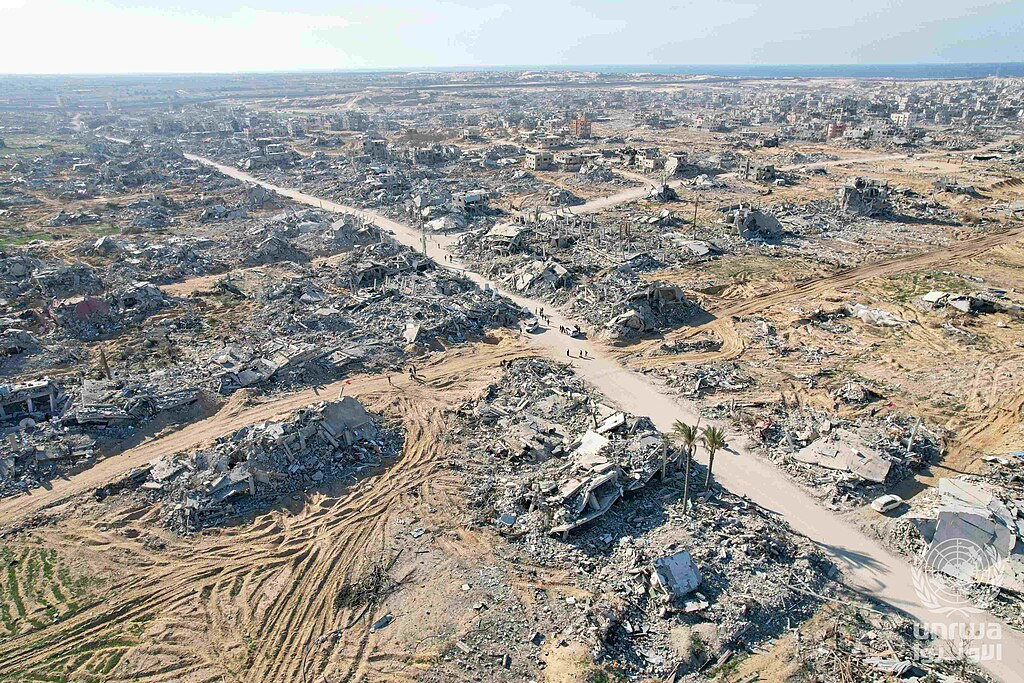
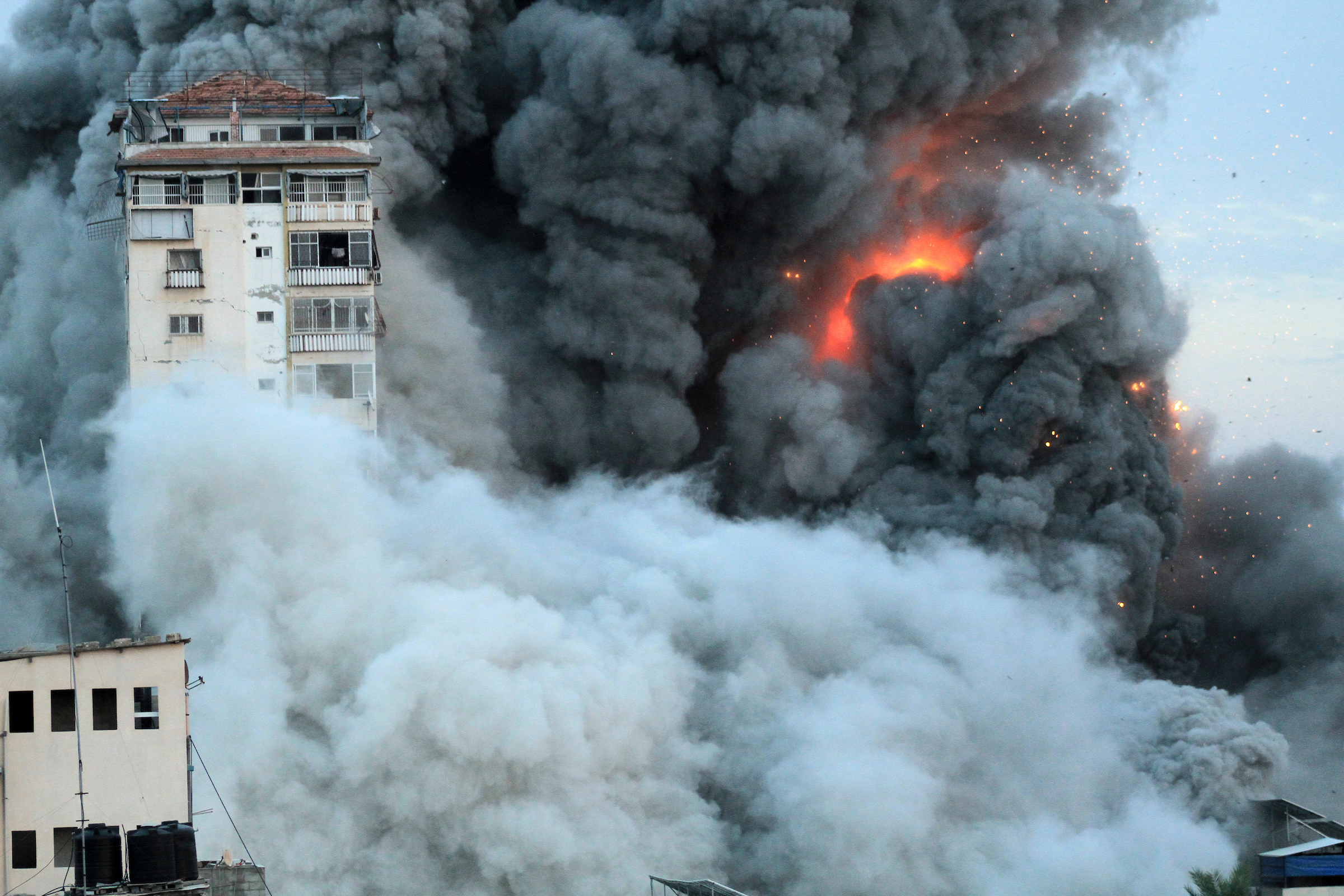
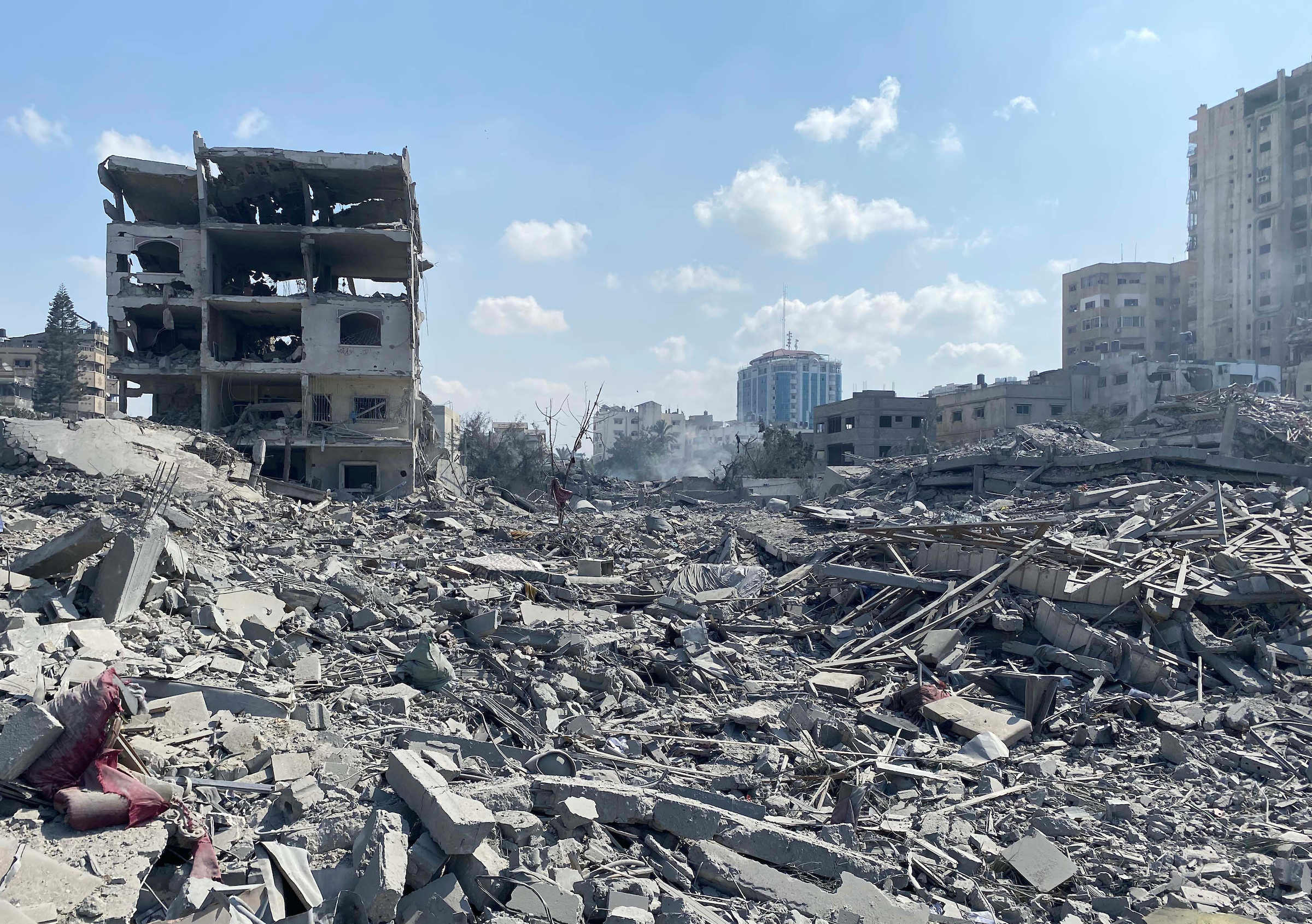
Clockwise from top:
- An aerial view showing destruction in Rafah after Israeli forces withdrawal and as the ceasefire took hold, Gaza Strip
- Damage following an Israeli airstrike on the El-Remal aera in Gaza City on 9 October 2023.
- Smoke and flames billow after Israeli forces struck a high-rise tower in Gaza City

Mark Levene and Elyse Semerdjian locate the mass destruction of infrastructure within Israel's Dahiya doctrine, implemented against Gaza since 2006, with Levene calling it urbicide and a tool of genocide. In October 2024, Forensic Architecture concluded, "Israel's military campaign in Gaza is organised, systematic, and intended to destroy conditions of life and life-sustaining infrastructure".

In July 2025, The Guardian reported that "about 70% of the structures in Gaza are either completely destroyed or severely damaged". Israel was reportedly paying contractors up to 5,000 shekels per building demolished. In February 2025 it was reported that at least 15 children had died of hypothermia over the winter due to Israel's destruction of housing and power facilities. In May 2025, Netanyahu said, "we are destroying more and more homes, and Gazans have nowhere to return to. The only inevitable outcome will be the wish of Gazans to emigrate outside of the Gaza Strip."

In September 2026, updated satellite imagery on Google Maps showed that entire residential neighborhoods had vanished and vast urban areas had been reduced to fields of rubble and debris. The updated imagery captured a striking transformation of Gaza's urban landscape, in which destruction extended beyond individual buildings to encompass whole residential blocks, leaving large expanses of empty land where densely populated neighborhoods once stood.

In a December 2024 report, Human Rights Watch accused Israel of committing acts of genocide in Gaza by targeting water and sanitation infrastructure and depriving Palestinians of adequate access to water. The report alleges that Israel intentionally damaged solar panels powering treatment plants, a reservoir, and warehouses, while blocking repair materials and fuel for generators, cutting electricity supplies, and attacking workers. According to B'Tselem, Israel has destroyed 84% of Gaza's water facilities, while in a report authored and published by the World Bank, European Union, and United Nations it was reported that 89% of Gaza's water, sanitation, and hygiene facilities had been destroyed or damaged. UN Special Rapporteur Pedro Arrojo-Agudo called these attacks "an important part of a genocidal strategy".

Rafah, a city in the southern Gaza Strip, has been razed; this has been mostly carried out by bulldozing and controlled demolitions of buildings, rather than by aerial bombardment. In July 2025, the BBC reported that Israel had engaged in controlled demolitions of civilian infrastructure, potentially in violation of the Geneva Convention. The BBC reported an IDF spokesperson saying, "Hamas and other terrorist organizations conceal military assets in densely populated civilian areas. The IDF identifies and destroys terrorist infrastructure located, among other places, within buildings in these areas." In November 2025, the BBC reported that Israel had demolished over 1,500 more buildings in Gaza since the ceasefire with Hamas. A spokesperson for the IDF said it was acting "in accordance with the ceasefire framework" as the demolitions occurred behind the Yellow Line, in the portion of Gaza under Israeli military control, which comprises 53% of Gaza.

==== Preventing births ====
In March 2025, a UN investigation concluded that Israel had committed genocidal acts in Gaza by systematically destroying its reproductive healthcare facilities while imposing a siege preventing necessary medications for deliveries, pregnancies, and neonatal care, causing "irreversible" harm to Palestinians' reproductive prospects in Gaza. The commission also found that Israeli forces intentionally destroyed Gaza's main in-vitro fertility clinic, Al-Basma IVF Centre, which served 2,000 to 3,000 patients monthly. Israel destroyed about 4,000 embryos and 1,000 specimens of sperm and unfertilised eggs in the attack. No evidence was found that the building was used for military purposes. The commission concluded that the clinic's destruction "was a measure intended to prevent births among Palestinians in Gaza, which is a genocidal act". UN experts reported that they had found that Israel had systematically destroyed women's health care facilities and used sexual violence as a war strategy, thereby carrying out genocidal acts against Palestinians.

According to statistics from the Gaza Ministry of Health reported by Physicians for Human Rights, the birth rate in Gaza in May and June 2025 had fallen 41% from the same months in 2022. The ministry also reported an increase in infant mortality, miscarriages, and premature births in Gaza during this time.

=== Destruction of civilian and social systems ===
==== Attacks on healthcare ====
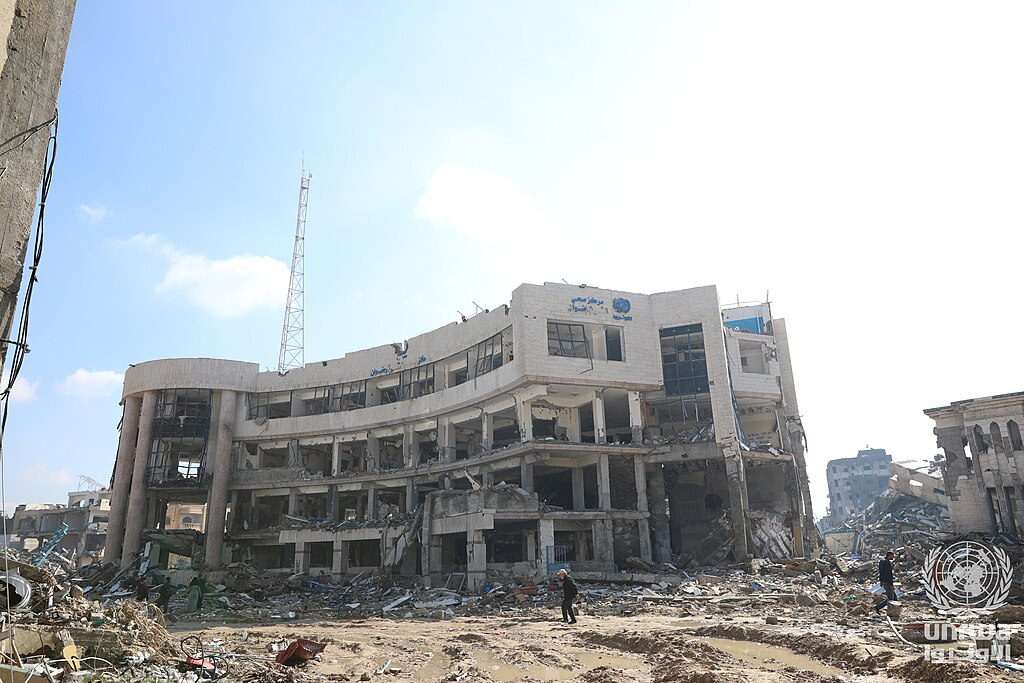
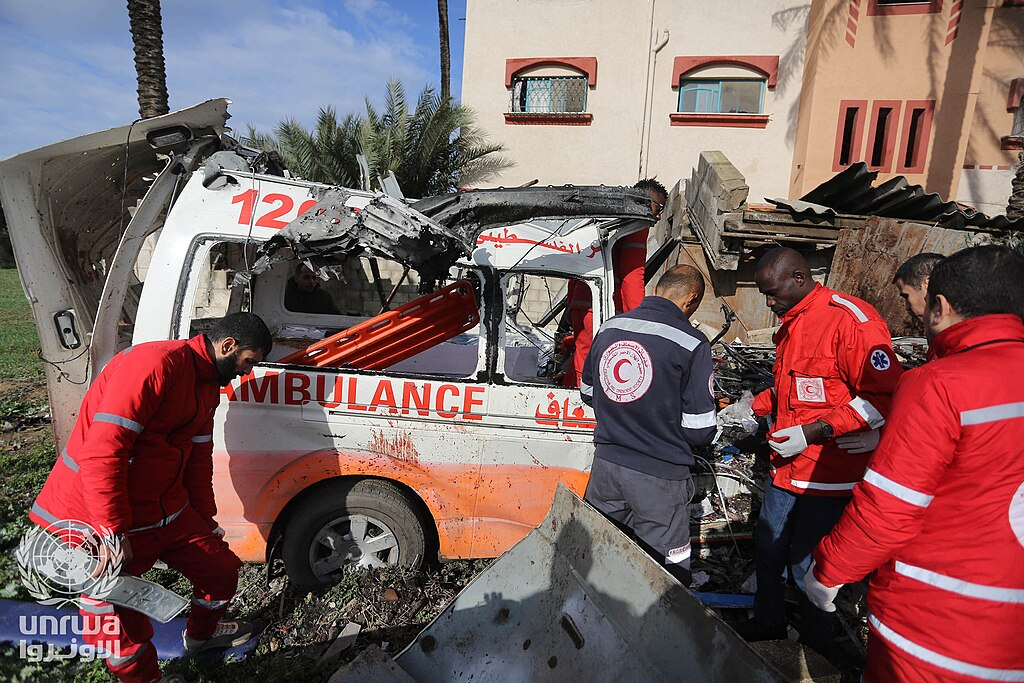
Top to bottom:
- Destruction of UNRWA el-Sheikh Radwan health centre, February 2024
- Palestinian Red Crescent Personnel inspect a destroyed ambulance in Deir el-Balah, Gaza Strip

In November 2023 in The Lancet and in February 2024 in BMJ Global Health, multiple doctors detailed how the targeting of Gazan health infrastructure and medical personnel, coupled with rhetoric used by Israeli politicians, amounts to genocide. Legal scholars have supported this assessment. Gaza's healthcare system faced humanitarian crises as a result of Israel's assault: hospitals began shutting down by 23 October as they ran out of fuel. When hospitals lost power, multiple premature babies in NICUs died.

Israeli airstrikes have killed numerous medical staffers, and ambulances and health institutions have been destroyed. Médecins Sans Frontières reported that scores of ambulances and medical facilities were damaged or destroyed, and that its own staff were killed. The Gaza Health Ministry said the healthcare system had "totally collapsed". In April 2024, UN special rapporteur on the right to health Tlaleng Mofokeng said, "The destruction of healthcare facilities continues to catapult to proportions yet to be fully quantified."

As of February 2025, at least 160 healthcare workers from Gaza are believed to be detained by Israel, with another 24 missing after being taken from Gaza hospitals. Al-Shifa hospital director Mohammed Abu Salmiya, detained for seven months and released without charges, detailed the abuses he faced and said that in Israeli prisons "no day passes without torture".

==== Destruction of cultural, religious and educational sites ====
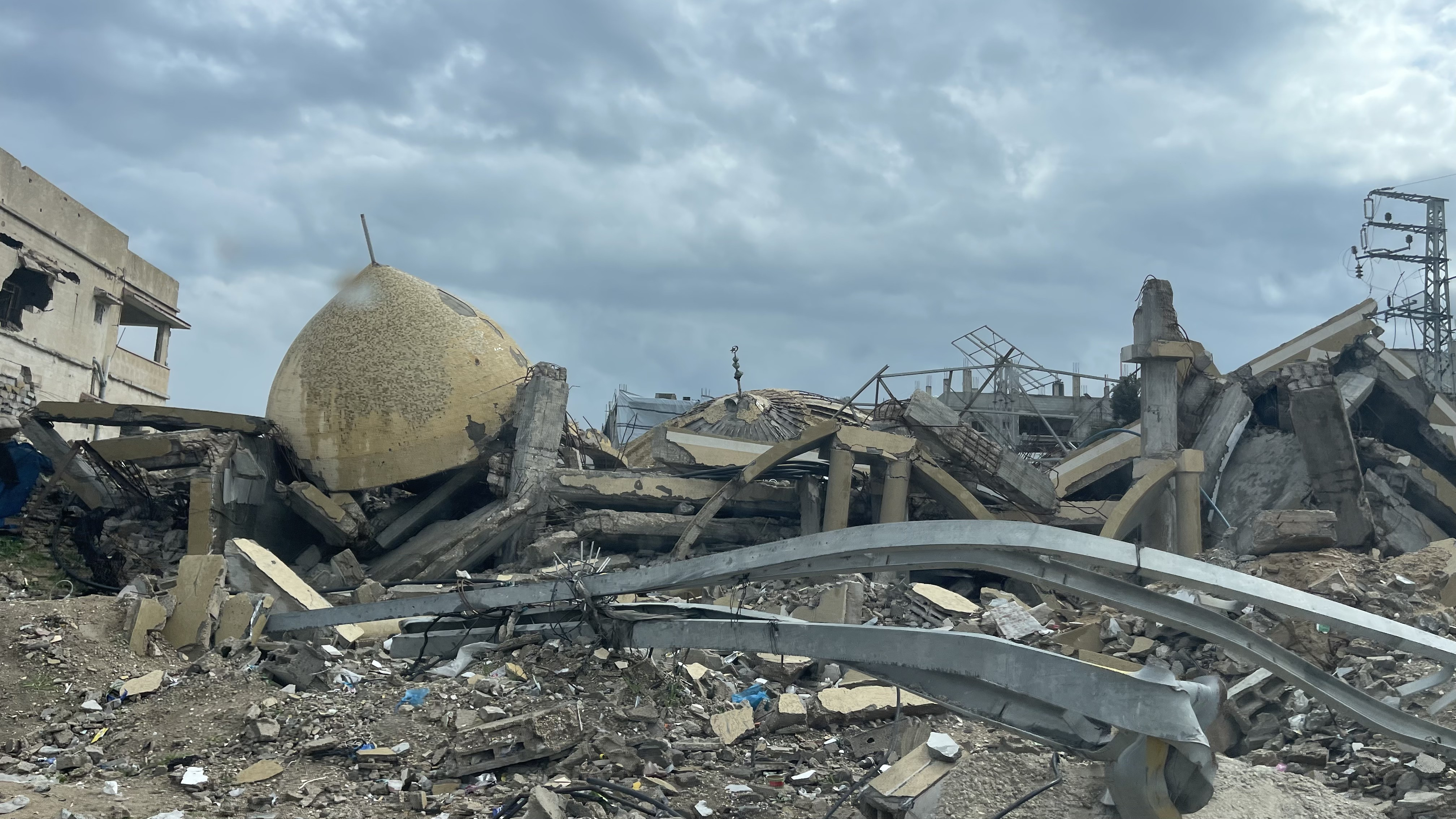
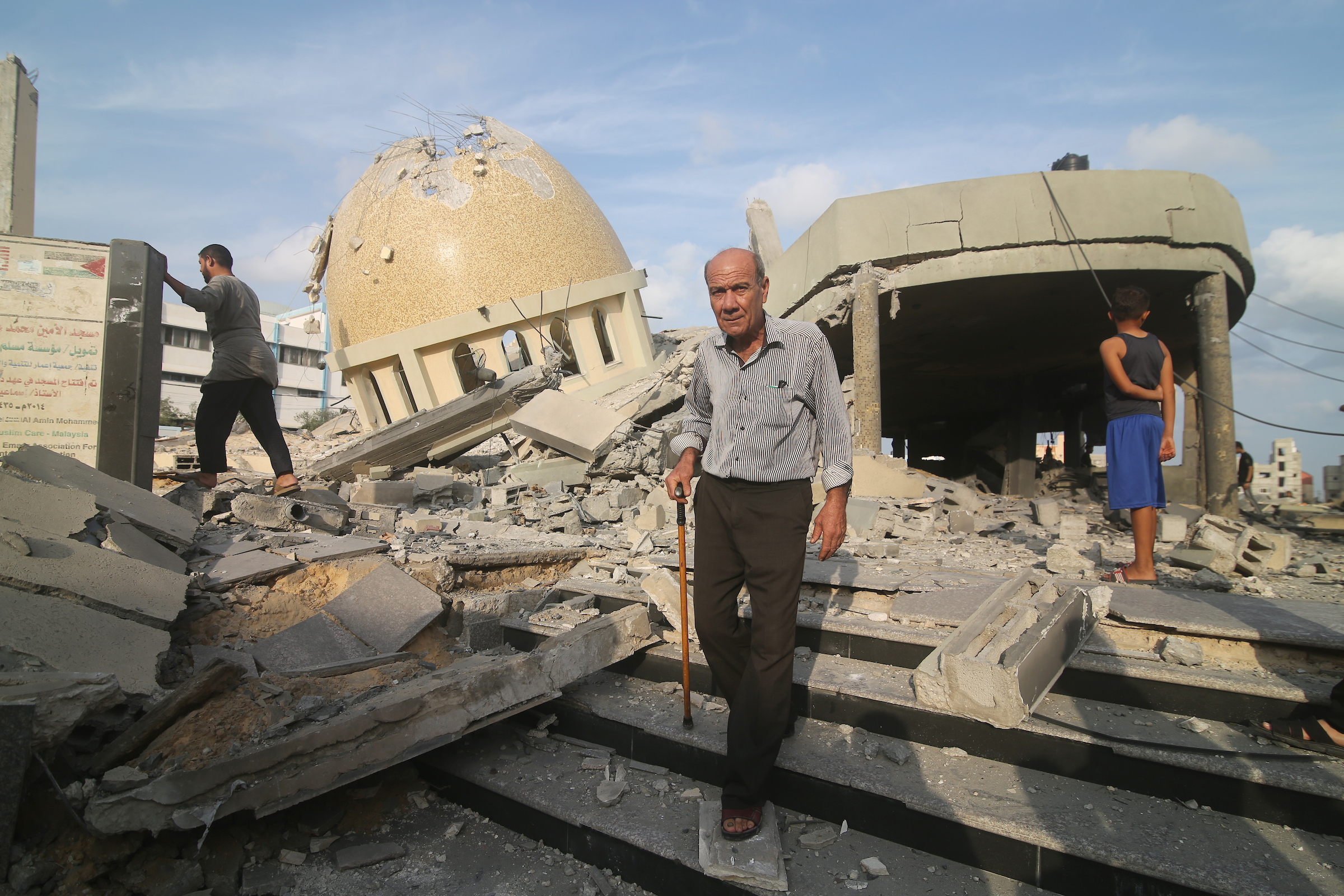
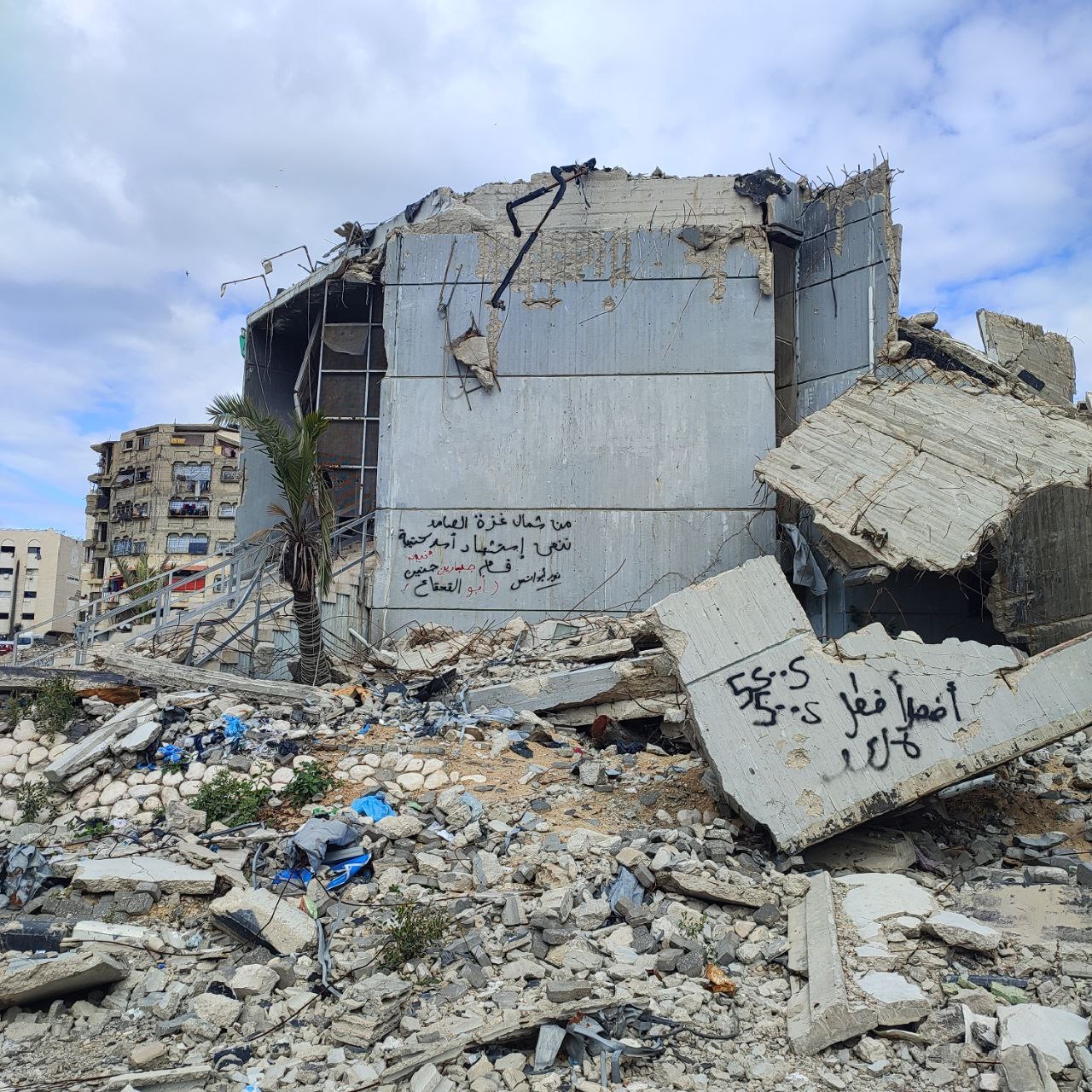
Clockwise from top:
- A mosque in Gaza destroyed in an Israeli airstrike, 20 February 2025.
- The wreckage of the Rashad Shawa Cultural Center
- A mosque in Khan Younis, 8 October 2023

Amnesty International notes that "while the destruction of historical, cultural and religious property or heritage is not considered a prohibited act under the Genocide Convention, the ICJ has established that such destruction can provide evidence of intent to physically destroy the group when carried out deliberately." The Lemkin Institute for Genocide Prevention has said that Israel's deliberate destruction of cemeteries in Gaza indicates genocidal intent because it enacts the "erasure of a people's...historical presence".

Since 7 October 2023, the IDF has been accused of using excessive force against dozens of schools; theft; desecration and mutilation of deceased Palestinians; and making no, or an inadequate, distinction between Hamas forces and civilians. The targeting of cultural and educational sites have also been cited as genocidal acts, as has the use of white phosphorus. (Note: The use of white phosphorus against military targets located among civilians is contrary to Protocol III of the Convention on Certain Conventional Weapons, of which Israel is not a signatory.)

On 18 April 2024, UN experts in Geneva condemned Israel for its "scholasticide" in Gaza, finding that it had destroyed more than 80% of schools and killed 5,000 students, 261 teachers, and dozens of professors.

Amnesty International identified at least four instances in which there was "no imperative military necessity" for the deliberate destruction of Gazan cultural and religious sites: the destruction of the Al-Mughraqa campus of Al-Azhar University, the Al-Zahra campus of Israa University, the Al-Dhilal mosque and Bani Suheila cemetery in Khan Younis, and the Al-Istiqlal mosque in Khan Younis. Amnesty International pointed to the attitudes and behaviour of Israeli soldiers involved in the demolitions of these sites in videos posted on social media as evidence that these actions demonstrated genocidal intent. Amnesty International also noted the overall volume of destruction of Gazan cultural, historical and religious sites, including Gaza's central archives.

As of January 2025, Israel had destroyed 815 mosques and 19 cemeteries during the Gaza war.

In June 2025, UN experts published a report saying Israel had committed the crime against humanity of extermination for "killing civilians sheltering in schools and religious sites". According to the report, Israel has destroyed over 90% of educational buildings in Gaza.

=== Targeting of specific groups ===
==== Educators ====
The killing of educators and destruction of educational infrastructure such as schools and universities has been recognised by scholars as a component of the Gaza genocide. In support of its 2025 resolution declaring that Israel's policies and actions in Gaza had met the legal definition of genocide, the IAGS wrote, "Israel has destroyed schools, universities, libraries, museums, and archives, all of them essential to the continued existence of Palestinian collective well-being and identity".

United Nations special rapporteurs and experts suggested there was "an intentional effort to comprehensively destroy the Palestinian education system, an action known as 'scholasticide'". They said the attacks "present a systematic pattern of violence aimed at dismantling the very foundation of Palestinian society".

In its filing with the ICJ charging Israel with the crime of genocide, South Africa cited the destruction of four universities and the killing of leading Palestinian academics Professor Sufian Tayeh, president of the Islamic University; Ahmed Hamdi Abo Absa, dean of the software engineering department at the University of Palestine; Muhammad Eid Shabir, professor of immunology and virology and former president of the Islamic University of Gaza; and Refaat Alareer, poet and professor of comparative literature and creative writing at the Islamic University of Gaza.

Researchers at Birzeit university called the killing of educators "deliberate and systematic", saying that "94 professors were targeted and killed by Israeli occupation".

==== Journalists ====
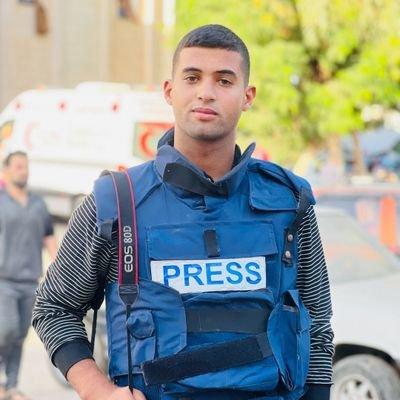
"Language makes genocide justifiable. A reason why we are still being bombed after 243 days is because of The New York Times and most Western media." – Hossam Shabat, a Palestinian journalist whom Israel accused without evidence of being a member of Hamas and killed in an airstrike on 24 March 2025

Press freedom organisations and human rights groups have characterised the systematic killing of Palestinian journalists as a component of the genocide. The International Federation of Journalists reported that 56 media professionals were killed in 2025 alone as part of the "genocidal war on Gaza". Media critics including Robin Anderson and Adam Johnson have claimed that traditional media has inadequately reported on the large number of journalists killed; in a study of 1,100 articles, Johnson found that only nine them contained the words "journalists", "reporters" or "photojournalists" in the headline and only four of those were about Arab reporters.

South Africa cited Palestinian journalists being "killed at a rate significantly higher than has occurred in any conflict in the past 100 years" as part of its application accusing Israel of genocide.

The IDF has been accused of directly targeting journalists and media organisations despite clear marking and protective measures. Al Jazeera reported that 278 journalists and 706 family members of Palestinian journalists have been killed during the "genocidal war" since October 2023.

A Brown University study found that Israel had killed more journalists in Gaza since October 2023 than "the U.S. Civil War, World Wars I and II, the Korean War, Vietnam War, the wars in Yugoslavia in the 1990s and 2000s, and the post-9/11 war in Afghanistan, combined".

The CPJ observed that "Israel is engaging in the deadliest and most deliberate effort to kill and silence journalists that CPJ has ever documented" and that there was a "pattern of journalists in Gaza reporting receiving threats, and subsequently, their family members being killed".

In a case filed with the ICC, the RSF accused the IDF of the targeted killing of seven journalists in Gaza between 22 October and 15 December 2023: Asem Al-Barsh, Bilal Jadallah, Montaser Al-Sawaf, Rushdi Al Siraj, Hassouna Salim, Sari Mansour, and Al Jazeera's Abudaqa. Targeting journalists is a war crime under Article 8 of the Rome Statute.

The PCHR alleges that this killing is to intimidate and deter journalists from coverage of current events.

==== Medical workers ====
The systematic killing of Palestinian medical workers has been characterised as a central component of the genocide, sometimes termed "medicide" (the use of military force and state policy to systematically destroy a society's access to medical care).

Physicians for Human Rights Israel said the killing and detention of over 1,800 healthcare workers, including senior specialists, is not incidental to war but a deliberate strategy to decimate medical capacity and render future recovery nearly impossible and that this met the criteria for genocide.

UN Special Rapporteur on the Right to Health Tlaleng Mofokeng called the assault on Gaza's medical sector "medicide" and a component of the ongoing genocide.

== Board of Peace ==
On 27 June 2026, The Guardian released a story about a draft resolution of the Board of Peace, which Omar Shakir of DAWN said could potentially lead to complete immunity for Israel from any prosecution for crimes in Gaza and enable it to seize any land or property for its own use without recompense, adding: "Far from signaling an end to genocide, apartheid and occupation, this document suggests entrenching some of its ugliest signature characteristics. This risks not only complicity, but direct perpetration of grave abuses."

On 30 June, the Board of Peace reportedly scheduled a pilot scheme to put Gaza civilians into camps overseen by a multilateral force. The aim is to leave Hamas with "no people, no land, and no resources". Ahmed al-Tanani of the Arab Center for Research and Policy Studies said Hamas is demanding the mediators provide real guarantees to prevent humanitarian projects from turning into a "cover for genocide".

== Academic and legal discourse ==
Answers to the question "How would you define Israel's military campaign in Gaza?" among scholars specialized in Middle East studies in a February 19–March 11, 2026 survey.
1. Genocide (54%)
2. Major war crimes akin to genocide (32%)
3. Major war crimes but not akin to genocide (8%)
4. Unjustified actions but not major war crimes (3%)
5. Justified actions under the right to self-defense (3%)
6. I don't know (1%)
"Note: Percentages may not always add to one hundred due to rounding."

There is a growing consensus among genocide and Holocaust scholars, international legal experts, human rights organisations, and governments that Israel's actions in Gaza constitute genocide. Israel and its supporters deny the accusation.

=== Relationship to Zionism and the Nakba ===
Palestinians have emphasized the relationship between the Gaza genocide and Zionism and its political violence, describing the Gaza genocide as a continuation of the Nakba and ongoing Nakba.

Some scholars argue that the Gaza genocide is merely the latest stage of a "slow-motion genocide" of Palestinians that began with the Nakba and the expulsion of hundreds of thousands of Palestinians upon Israel's founding in 1948.

According to B'Tselem and others, the Gaza genocide is occurring in the context of over 75 years of Zionist settler colonial violence and Jewish supremacy targeting Palestinians. Multiple genocide scholars argue that settler colonialism is an important motive for Israel's actions. Raz Segal and B'Tselem also highlight the increasing influence of Jewish supremacy in Israeli politics, while reports by Francesca Albanese and Amos Goldberg highlight the project of Greater Israel.

=== Genocide and Holocaust studies ===
In May 2025, NRC wrote that leading scholars in genocide studies are "surprisingly unanimous" that Israel is committing genocide. Some scholars of Holocaust studies, such as Americans Norman J. W. Goda and Jeffrey Herf, have said that Israel is not committing genocide. Others, such as Israeli professors Raz Segal and Shira Klein, have argued that Israel's actions should be analysed as a case of genocide, citing, among other things, attacks on infrastructure, food, and water as genocidal. Omer Bartov, professor of Holocaust and genocide studies at Brown University and an Israel Defense Forces veteran, has said: "intent has been publicly expressed by numerous officials and leaders. But intent can also be derived from a pattern of operations on the ground, and this pattern became clear by May 2024". Amos Goldberg and Daniel Blatman, historians of the Holocaust and genocide studies at the Hebrew University of Jerusalem, noted that "most acts of genocide are perceived by their perpetrators as acts of self-defense against their victims" and the Gaza war "falls into this category".

On 31 August 2025, the International Association of Genocide Scholars (IAGS), the world's largest academic association of genocide scholars, passed a resolution saying that Israel has committed genocide in Gaza.

=== Legal and human rights experts ===
In December 2023, former International Criminal Court chief prosecutor Luis Moreno Ocampo told Al Jazeera that the siege of Gaza was a form of genocide due to Israel's imposing conditions that would lead to the deaths of Palestinians. In December, in correspondence published in The Lancet, multiple specialists in international medicine and humanitarian aid reiterated warnings of the risk of genocide, while detailing how Israel's blocking of humanitarian support and aid were leading to unnecessary deaths, and how the death rate would continue to worsen. They called on signatories to the Genocide Convention to enforce a ceasefire on Israel. Nimer Sultany argues that, by mid-2024, a growing consensus among legal scholars suggested that Israel was committing genocide in Gaza. Multiple public declarations from journals and academic organisations have warned of a potential genocide and declared opposition to an ongoing genocide.

In January 2024, a number of prominent Israelis, represented by the human-rights lawyer Michael Sfard, sent Israel's attorney general and state prosecutor an open letter detailing examples of "the discourse of annihilation, expulsion and revenge". The signatories said the Israeli judiciary was ignoring incitement to genocide in Gaza. In January 2024, the American political scientist and international relations scholar John Mearsheimer wrote that, while he had believed during the first two months of the war that Israel was "guilty of serious war crimes", once the 2023 Gaza war ceasefire ended, it "became clear" to him "that Israeli leaders were in fact seeking to physically destroy a substantial portion of Gaza's Palestinian population". William Schabas, an expert in international criminal law, said that South Africa's case was the strongest of all recent genocide cases at the International Court of Justice, citing the destruction of Gazan infrastructure and statements by Israeli politicians that Gazans are "human animals" and that Israel would deny them electricity, water, and medical care.

On 26 January 2024, the ICJ issued a preliminary ruling finding that the rights asserted in South Africa's filing were "plausible", and an order requiring that Israel take all measures in its power to prevent acts of genocide, prevent and punish incitement to genocide, and allow basic humanitarian services into Gaza. Judge ad hoc Aharon Barak dissented from the majority's view that genocide-related rights were "plausible", writing that South Africa had not demonstrated genocidal intent on Israel's part.

On 15 May 2024, a report by the University Network for Human Rights, Boston University School of Law, Cornell Law School, University of Pretoria, and the Yale Law School found that "Israel has committed genocidal acts". In a May 2024 interview, Human Rights Watch co-founder Aryeh Neier detailed how Israel's blocking of aid and the subsequent starvation of Gaza's population is indicative of genocide.

On 1 June 2024, professor of international law Daniel-Erasmus Khan said there was no clear evidence of a special intent among Israeli leadership. A June 2024 report by the University Network for Human Rights and Boston University School of Law found that "Israel has committed genocidal acts". In an August 2024 op-ed, Eli Rosenbaum, a lawyer and former director of the United States Department of Justice's Office of Special Investigations, wrote that Israel's actions in Gaza were not genocidal since it was aiming to "prevent genocide" by Hamas.

In October 2024, legal scholar Conor Gearty called Israel genocidal, pointing to the continued attacks on schools and hospitals and the lack of internal investigations by Israeli authorities into potential crimes. Grietje Baars, who advocates Marxist legal theory, and José Manuel Barreto, who advocates Third World approaches to international law, have argued that the international community's failure to treat Israel's actions in Gaza as genocide and respond accordingly has harmed the principles of the international order and international law itself, and exposed the deficiencies of international governance. Legal scholar José Manuel Barreto argues that "the Palestinian genocide has unveiled the deep colonial structure of the international legal order" and identifies events in Gaza with the history of genocides in the colonised world, which he says the Westphalian system has historically failed to prevent.

In December 2024, Amnesty International published a report accusing Israel of committing genocide. After the Amnesty report, Human Rights Watch also said Israel had committed "genocidal acts" and that Israeli officials statements may indicate genocidal intent.

In April 2025, the barrister Michael Mansfield said there was "no question" that genocide was occurring. In May 2025, Luigi Daniele, a lecturer at Nottingham Law School, noted a link between the IDF's justification for its conduct in Gaza and the Rapid Support Forces rationale in the Sudanese civil war, saying it "reveals the emergence of a template to commit mass extermination and even genocide". In May 2024 the legal scholar Nimer Sultany supported Forensic Architecture's assessment that Israel had weaponised international humanitarian law into "humanitarian violence". This was supported in July by legal scholar Neve Gordon and the anthropologist Nicola Perugini, who argued that Israel used "the law itself as a tool legitimizing genocide".

In June 2025, Ambos and scholar Stefanie Bock wrote that it has become more difficult to deny genocidal intent.

In July 2025, 1,300 professionals and academics in public health, health care, and the social sciences signed a letter acknowledging the Gaza genocide. According to peace studies scholar Ernesto Verdeja, even by "the most inflexible interpretation of genocide, Gaza qualifies as genocidal". In July 2025, Le Monde reported that legal experts remained divided on the question, with some agreeing that Israel was committing genocide and others viewing the charge as unsubstantiated. Bartov wrote that the silence of many scholars of the Holocaust and Holocaust commemoration institutions and their disbelief that Israel could commit war crimes, crimes against humanity, ethnic cleansing, or genocide threatens universalist interpretations of Holocaust studies and Holocaust commemoration and may lead to a decline in the relevance of Holocaust education. Journalist Colin Jones interviewed lawyers affiliated with the US military and concluded that they see Gaza as a test case for what military conduct might be acceptable in a hypothetical war between the US and a peer power such as China.

In August 2025, according to Mia Swart, a growing consensus was emerging "in international legal circles that Israel is committing genocide". Craig Mokhiber, a retired UN human rights lawyer, wrote, "Never, in the modern era, have we seen such a clear-cut, article-by-article violation of the United Nations Genocide Convention, so broad a consensus in the identification of the crime".

=== Other scholars ===
In March 2024, the Middle East Studies Association condemned the "accelerating scale of genocidal violence being inflicted on the Palestinian population of Gaza", saying that Israel's conduct constituted cultural genocide. Surveys of 758 Middle East scholars by the Brookings Institution indicated a growing consensus that Israel's military campaign in Gaza was genocide.

In 2025, John Spencer, chair of urban warfare studies at the Modern War Institute at the United States Military Academy, argued that Israel had not demonstrated genocidal intent, based on what he called "evidence of what Israel is doing to preserve infrastructure, civilian life, to provide services".

Robert Satloff of The Washington Institute for Near East Policy criticized the IAGS genocide resolution for its sourcing and for lacking independent research, noting that it passed with the support of "only one-fifth ... of the organization's membership", though he wrote that his "critique of the IAGS resolution should not be misread as endorsement of Israeli strategy and tactics in Gaza or indifference to the terrible human toll in this conflict".

== Legal proceedings ==
=== International Court of Justice application ===
Stances of states on South Africa v. Israel: South Africa Countries that have supported South Africa's case Countries that have opposed South Africa's case Israel

In December 2023, South Africa instituted proceedings at the International Court of Justice pursuant to the Genocide Convention, accusing Israel of committing genocide, war crimes, and crimes against humanity against Palestinians in Gaza. South African president Cyril Ramaphosa compared Israel's actions to apartheid. Several international organisations and other nations supported South Africa's suit.

In its application, South Africa argued that Israel's actions "are genocidal in character because they are intended to bring about the destruction of a substantial part of the Palestinian national, racial and ethnical group". South Africa requested that the ICJ issue an interim order requiring Israel to "immediately suspend its military operations in and against Gaza".

On 26 January 2024, the ICJ issued a preliminary ruling finding that the rights asserted in South Africa's filing were "plausible" and issued an order requiring that Israel take all measures in its power to prevent acts of genocide, prevent and punish incitement to genocide, and allow basic humanitarian services into Gaza. Later that year, South Africa asked the ICJ to order additional measures against Israel, and in May, the court issued what some experts considered to be an ambiguous order but which was widely understood as requiring Israel to immediately halt its offensive in Rafah. Israel rejected this interpretation and continued its offensive.

The Israeli government spokesman Eylon Levy rejected the allegations "with disgust" and accused South Africa of cooperating with Hamas, calling South Africa's claims "blood libel". On 2 January 2024, Israel decided to appear before the ICJ in response to South Africa's case, despite a history of ignoring international tribunals. On 13 January, Netanyahu said, "No one will stop us. Not The Hague, not the Axis of Evil, no one." Israeli officials accused the court of antisemitic bias. Israel asserted that it had taken all possible measures to safeguard civilians during its military campaign in Gaza. Some left-wing Israeli politicians, including Ofer Cassif, supported South Africa's case.

International Court of Justice Vice President Julia Sebutinde was one of the 17 judges ruling on provisional measures in South Africa's genocide case against Israel. She voted against all the provisional measures, and was the only permanent judge to vote against any of the measures. In her dissenting opinion, Sebutinde wrote, "multiple concrete actions were taken by Israel to facilitate the provision of humanitarian aid for the civilian population of Gaza." She was accused of plagiarizing large parts of her dissenting opinion from pro-Israel sources, Wikipedia, and the BBC. According to political scientist Norman Finkelstein, "at least 32 percent of Sebutinde's dissent was plagiarised", including from writings by Douglas Feith.

=== International Criminal Court ===
In May 2024, International Criminal Court chief prosecutor Karim Ahmad Khan applied for arrest warrants against Israeli Prime Minister Netanyahu and Minister of Defence Yoav Gallant, saying he had reasonable grounds to believe they bore criminal responsibility for war crimes and crimes against humanity committed in Gaza. The charges were the war crimes of starvation of civilians as a weapon of war, willfully causing great suffering or serious injury to body or health, willful killing or murder and intentionally directing attacks against a civilian population, and the crimes against humanity of extermination and/or murder, persecution and "other inhumane acts". The list of crimes did not include genocide, which is legally distinct from extermination. The warrants were issued in November 2024.

As part of a December 2024 report accusing Israel of genocide, Amnesty International called on the ICC "to urgently consider the commission of the crime of genocide by Israeli officials since 7 October 2023 in the ongoing investigation into the situation in the State of Palestine". Also in December 2024, the Israeli law professor Omer Shatz filed a complaint with the ICC naming eight Israeli political and media figures he believed were guilty of incitement to genocide. On 1 October 2025, a complaint was filed with the ICC accusing Italian Prime Minister Giorgia Meloni and other officials of genocide for their support of Israel.

The United States and Israel have imposed sanctions on and politically pressured the ICC in response. The US has directly sanctioned half the court's 18 judges as well as other officials. In July 2026, US Secretary of State Marco Rubio threatened to dismantle the court "brick by brick". In October 2026, the US announced further sanctions banning US entities from making transactions with the ICC. The ICC called the sanctions "an assault on the rule of law and on the very foundations of the international legal order". The Netherlands, Germany, France, Japan, Italy, Canada, Denmark and the United Kingdom jointly reaffirmed their "continued and unwavering support" for the ICC and said that they strongly disagreed with the sanctions. The European Commission said that the European Union was "ready to take any necessary measures to enable the court to carry out its work".

=== Other proceedings ===
In November 2023, the Center for Constitutional Rights sued US President Joe Biden, Secretary of State Antony Blinken, and Secretary of Defence Lloyd Austin, alleging that Israel's "mass killings", targeting of civilian infrastructure, and forced expulsions amount to genocide, and that the US was capable of deterring Israel from committing these acts due to the countries' close relationship. A federal judge dismissed the case in January 2024, ruling that the US Constitution prevented his court from determining foreign policy, but writing that "as the ICJ has found, it is plausible that Israel's conduct amounts to genocide". The judge also commented that he would have preferred to have issued the injunction and urged Biden to rethink US policy.

In February 2024, lawyers representing Palestinians in Germany filed a criminal complaint against politicians including Chancellor Olaf Scholz, Foreign Minister Annalena Baerbock, Economic Minister Robert Habeck, and Finance Minister Christian Lindner for "aiding and abetting" genocide in Gaza. The Public Prosecutor General dismissed the complaint due to lack of reasonable suspicion. The lawyers filed a similar complaint against current and former German government members in September 2025.

In March 2024, the Nicaraguan government initiated proceedings against Germany at the ICJ under the Genocide Convention concerning Germany's support for Israel in the Gaza war. It sought provisional measures of protection, including resumption of suspended German funding of the UNRWA and cessation of military supplies to Israel.

In March 2024, Birchgrove Legal referred Australian Prime Minister Anthony Albanese, Foreign Minister Penny Wong, Opposition Leader Peter Dutton, and others to the ICC as accessories to genocide, war crimes, and crimes against humanity, citing the defunding of UNRWA, the provision of military aid, and "unequivocal political support" for Israel's actions during the Gaza war.

In November 2025, the Chief Public Prosecutor's Office in Turkey issued arrest warrants for 37 Israeli suspects on charges of genocide and crimes against humanity. Officials named in the Turkish indictment included Netanyahu, security minister Itamar Ben-Gvir, defence minister Israel Katz (who had replaced Gallant), and IDF chief of staff Eyal Zamir.

== Responsibility of third states and other entities ==
All UN states that are signatories to the Genocide Convention are obliged "to employ all means reasonably available to them, so as to prevent genocide so far as possible" and must not provide "means to enable or facilitate the commission of the crime". Multiple scholars argue that the inaction of the international community to confirmed atrocities in Gaza expose the irrelevance and weakness of the Responsibility to Protect (R2P) doctrine. Many Western countries — especially the United States, Germany, and the United Kingdom — support Israel by offering diplomatic, military, and intelligence support. Some journalists, scholars, commentators, and UN officials say the actions of Western countries make them complicit in genocide.

The Independent International Commission of Inquiry on Palestine said, "States may be complicit in failing to prevent genocide if they do not act in compliance" with the International Court of Justice's orders or if they directly aid or assist in "the commission of genocide". A UN Special Committee wrote, "Failing to act now ... will tear apart the very foundation of the international rule of law we have collectively built to protect peace, security, and the well-being of all. Our inaction today is setting a perilous precedent for tomorrow."

=== United States ===
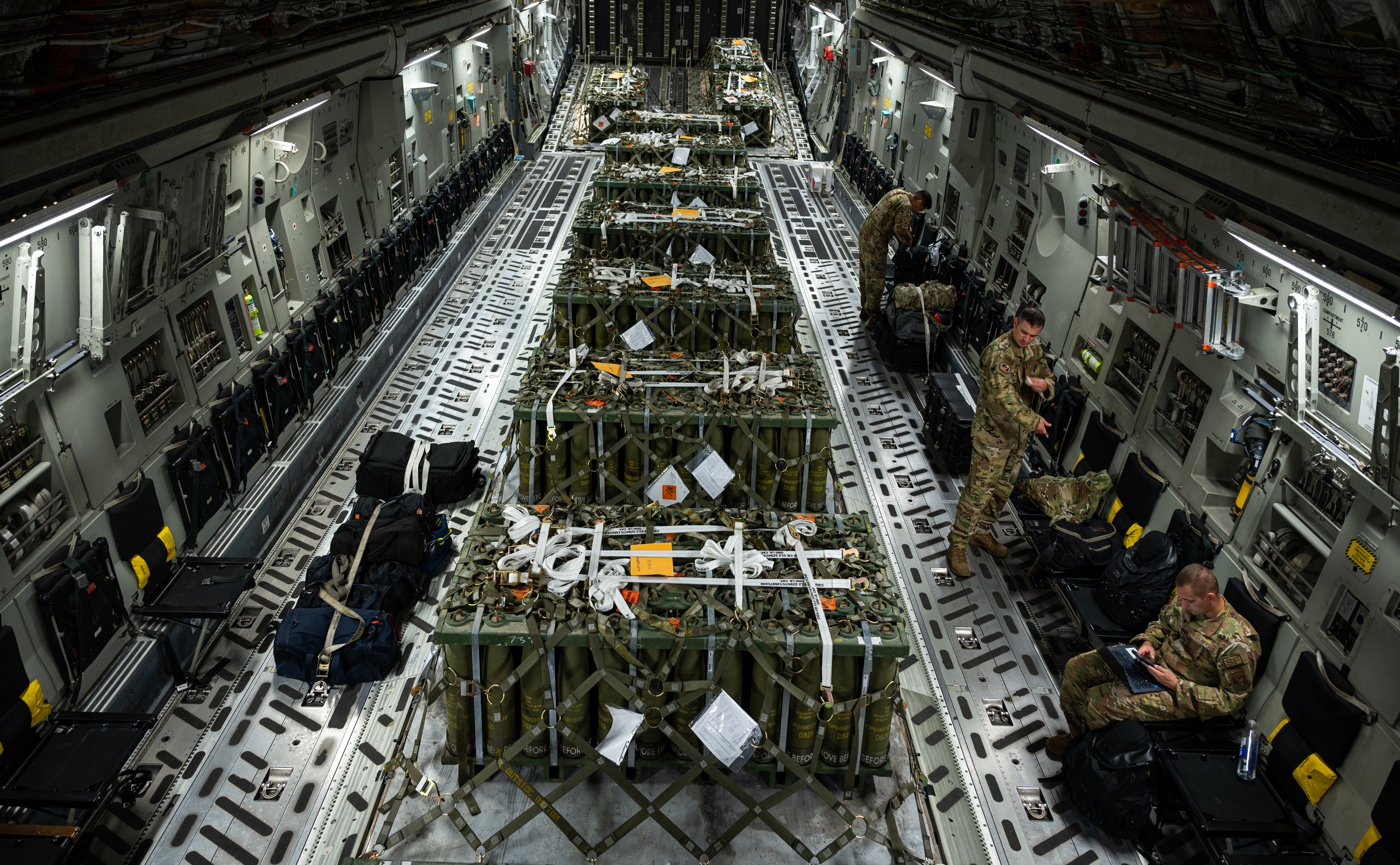
United States Air Force airmen prepare for departure in a C-17 Globemaster III to supply Israel with munitions, Oct. 15, 2023, at Ramstein Air Base, Germany.

Multiple sources—including scholars, journalists, think tanks, the Lemkin Institute, Human Rights Watch, and others—say that the United States is complicit in the genocide.

The United States has been a key provider of diplomatic and material support before and during the Gaza war. It pays for around 15% of Israel's military budget and is its largest supplier of arms; it provided more than $22.8 billion to the war effort in its first year.

Both the Biden and Trump administrations have denied the genocide in Gaza, but by September 2025 six members of the US Congress had recognised the genocide: Alexandria Ocasio-Cortez, Rashida Tlaib, Summer Lee, Marjorie Taylor Greene, Becca Balint, and Bernie Sanders. John Kirby, the U.S. National Security Council spokesman, described by Israeli media outlet Ynet as "an exceptionally accomplished Israeli advocate", said: "Israel's trying to defend itself against a genocidal terrorist threat. So if we're going to start using that word, fine, let's use it appropriately".

In November 2023, critics of President Joe Biden's support of Israel coined the nickname "Genocide Joe", which became popular among pro-Palestinian protesters. On 13 November 2023, the New York-based Center for Constitutional Rights sued Biden for allegedly failing in his legal duties to prevent Israel from committing genocide in Gaza in the Gaza war. In the lawsuit, genocide scholar William Schabas wrote that the US was "in breach of its obligation" under the 1948 Genocide Convention and international law. In January 2024, a federal judge dismissed the case, Defense for Children International – Palestine v. Biden, saying the Constitution prevented his court from determining foreign policy, which is reserved to the political branches of the U.S. government, though he would have preferred to have issued the injunction and urged Biden to rethink U.S. policy, writing, "it is plausible that Israel's conduct amounts to genocide." On 4 January 2024, the U.S. government acknowledged it was not formally assessing whether Israel was violating international humanitarian law. In September 2024, it was reported that the Biden administration ignored or suppressed several memos from its own governmental departments describing human rights abuses in Gaza.

In February 2025, President Donald Trump proposed a U.S. takeover of Gaza and the displacement of its population.

=== United Kingdom ===
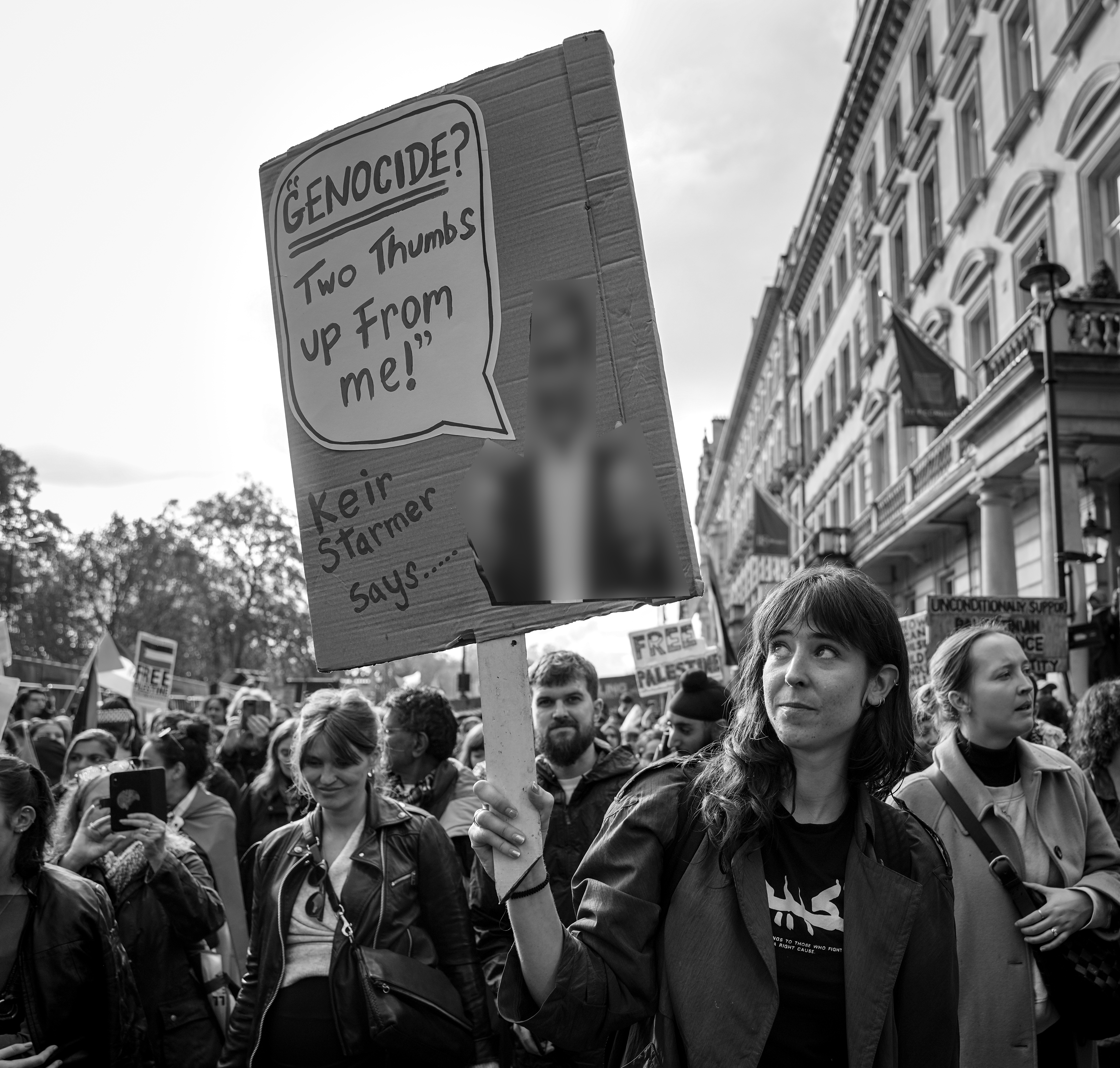
Protester holding a sign claiming the UK Labour Party leader Keir Starmer (image blurred due to copyright) supports genocide

The British government issues export licences for British companies to sell weapons to Israel. Multiple sources—including Human Rights Watch, Save the Children UK, lawyers, and scholars—say that the UK is complicit in the genocide because the UK government continues to issue companies licences to export weapons to Israel despite Israel's conduct in Gaza.

In December 2023, Scottish First Minister Humza Yousaf condemned the UK's abstention from a draft UN resolution calling for a ceasefire in Gaza, saying this would lead to the deaths of more children.

On 2 September 2024, Foreign Secretary David Lammy announced he was suspending approximately 30 arms export licences to Israel after a government review concluded there was a high risk these exports were being used for severe violations of international humanitarian law. At the time of the suspension, Israel had around 350 arms export licences in the UK.

On 3 September 2025, the Scottish Government announced a ban on funding to "arms companies whose products or services are provided to countries where there is plausible evidence of genocide being committed", including Israel. The Scottish Parliament also voted for a boycott of Israel and any companies providing it military support.

In February 2026, noting that over 2,000 UK nationals had served in the IDF during the genocide, the Public Interest Law Centre said the UK had a responsibility to investigate and prosecute where there is sufficient evidence.

In December 2023, human rights groups Al-Haq and Global Legal Action Network sued the British government, arguing that granting export licences for military equipment to Israel risked breaching the Genocide Convention. In June 2025, the High Court of Justice dismissed the case, ruling that the UK's continued participation in the F-35 programme—despite some components reaching Israel through a global spares pool—was lawful and partly beyond the scope of domestic courts.

=== European Union ===
The European Union was accused of potential complicity after it did not suspend the EU-Israel Association Agreement. Secretary General of Amnesty International Agnès Callamard said the EU was giving Israel a "green light" to continue its genocide and was at "risk of complicity in Israel's actions". The Rights Forum said the decision was "shameless complicity in genocide". In March 2024, Oxfam and several other non-governmental organisations released a statement detailing their intention (Note: Amnesty International; Mellemfolkeligt Samvirke; Al-Haq) to sue Denmark to prevent arms sales to Israel, warning that by selling arms Denmark was "complicit in violations of international humanitarian law ... and a plausible genocide".

==== Germany ====
In October 2023, political analyst Lena Obermaier argued that Germany is complicit in Israel's war crimes against Gaza. She detailed how most of Germany's most prominent news outlets have "been silent on Israeli genocidal policies". She also highlighted police suppression of pro-Palestine protests as evidence of state complicity. Accusing Israel of genocide is not illegal in Germany, but according to the European Legal Support Center, a nonprofit aligned with the Palestinian solidarity movement, at least one protester has been arrested after doing so. Germany's Federal Commissioner for the Fight against Antisemitism Felix Klein has called accusations of genocide against Israel antisemitic since they lead to demonisation and delegitimation of the country.

In February 2024 lawyers representing Palestinians in Germany filed a criminal complaint with the Public Prosecutor General against various senior politicians including Olaf Scholz, Annalena Baerbock, Robert Habeck, and Christian Lindner for "aiding and abetting" the genocide in Gaza. On 1 March 2024, Nicaragua instituted proceedings against Germany at the ICJ under the Genocide Convention concerning Germany's support for Israel in the Gaza war.

==== Italy ====
As of May 2025, Italy was Israel's third-largest supplier of weaponry, representing around 1% of Israel's weaponry imports. Despite the Italian government's claims that weaponry supplement to Israel had been interrupted, Leonardo, one of Italy's biggest arms companies, confirmed that the Italian government and Italian companies still exported arms to Israel. Francesca Albanese directly called Italy an accomplice in the Gaza genocide.

On 7 October 2025, Prime Minister Giorgia Meloni said in an interview with RAI – Radiotelevisione italiana that a pro-Palestinian advocacy group had reported her, Defence Minister Guido Crosetto, Foreign Minister Antonio Tajani, and Leonardo director Roberto Cingolani to the ICC for alleged complicity in the genocide. The complaint, which was signed by 50 people, including law professors, lawyers, and several public figures, was filed on 1 October. It accused Meloni's government of complicity for supplying arms to Israel and urged the ICC to evaluate whether a formal investigation into the allegation could be initiated.

=== Egypt ===
Egypt has been accused of complicity in genocide for its enforcement of the blockade on Gaza by refusing to open the Rafah Border Crossing. Egypt was also accused of complicity with Israel for its crackdown on the Global March to Gaza.

In April 2025, Cage and five other African advocacy organisations filed a complaint with the African Commission on Human and Peoples' Rights. Egypt is not permitted to turn people away at its borders if doing so would expose them to life-threatening conditions or collective punishment, as this would violate its obligations under the International Covenant on Civil and Political Rights and the Convention Against Torture.

Egypt has said that it closed the Rafah crossing in opposition to Israeli plans to displace Palestinians. It rejected an Israeli proposal that Gaza be returned to Egypt for up to 15 years and formally supported South Africa's genocide case against Israel.

=== India ===
On 30 July 2026, Amnesty International published "Made in India: The Supply of Weapons and Ammunition to Israel", a report that revealed India's military support to Israel despite the genocide. According to the report, since 7 October 2023, companies directly owned and controlled by the Indian government have sent Israel at least 2,596 weapons shipments containing ammunition, parts and accessories. Amnesty International also reported that at least 390,516 small arms parts for military-grade weapons, 564,970 explosive ordnance parts, and 298 military vehicle components were sent to defence companies in Israel. Amnesty International Secretary General Agnès Callamard said that India's transfer of arms to Israel violates its duty to prevent genocide under the Genocide Convention and demanded that India respect the Geneva Conventions.

=== Other states ===
In March 2024, the Sydney-based firm Birchgrove Legal Australian referred Prime Minister Anthony Albanese, Foreign Minister Penny Wong, Opposition Leader Peter Dutton, and others to the ICC as accessories to genocide, war crimes, and crimes against humanity, citing the defunding of UNRWA, the provision of military aid, and "unequivocal political support" for Israel's actions during the Gaza war.

According to the CCPA, Canada is complicit in the genocide because it has allowed military exports to Israel to continue under previously approved permits despite publicly saying that new arms sales were halted, and has not implemented a comprehensive arms embargo, leaving loopholes such as third-country transfers in place.

=== Private sector and media ===
Multiple corporations have been accused of profiting from the Gaza genocide. Lockheed Martin, General Dynamics, and RTX Corporation executives have called the war in Gaza a source of increased profits. From October 2023 to July 2025, RTX's stock price rose by 77%.

On 20 June 2024, UN experts warned that continued arms transfers to Israel could violate international law and risk state and corporate complicity in genocide. They called for an immediate halt to all weapons transfers to Israel, including by such major arms manufacturers as BAE Systems, Boeing, Lockheed Martin, and Caterpillar. They also warned institutions investing in these companies, such as Bank of America, BlackRock, Citigroup, and Wells Fargo.

In June 2025, a UN expert's report named Alphabet, Amazon, Microsoft, and IBM as "central to Israel's surveillance apparatus and the ongoing Gaza destruction", and Palantir as a source of AI tools for the Israeli military. The report also said Allianz, Barclays, BlackRock, and BNP Paribas had underwritten and purchased Israeli government bonds, which the UN said are the main source of financing for Israel's military expenditures.

Scholars, journalists, media analysts, and human rights advocates have accused various media outlets of complicity through media imperialism. Brazilian journalist Bruno Lima Rocha Beaklini has accused Brazilian media outlets of supporting genocide against Palestinians. Media analyst Adam H. Johnson has written that the Gaza genocide would have been impossible to sustain without the ongoing complicity of the U.S. corporate media. Robin Anderson has also argued that traditional media is complicit in enabling the genocide by providing inadequate coverage for mass murder of children, reporters, human rights workers and many other citizens not involved in the October 7 attack. She also claims that many mainstream media outlets have fired reporters critical of Israel but not reporters with family members in the IDF without disclosing this conflict of interests among their reporters.

== Political recognition ==
=== World leaders and governments ===
Positions of national governments on whether Israel is committing genocide in the Gaza war Agree Disagree Unclear Defer to the ruling in the ICJ case South Africa v. Israel No data

Several Western governments (notably the United States, United Kingdom, and Germany) reject calling Israel's actions in Gaza a genocide. Belgium, Norway, and Canada have said they will abide by or await the ICJ's judgment rather than take a definitive stance.

A large group of states, especially in the Islamic world, most of Africa, Latin America, and some European countries, explicitly describe Israel's actions as genocide and/or have joined or supported South Africa's ICJ case. These include Ghana, Turkey, Malaysia, Egypt, Brazil, Chile, Spain, Ireland, and Slovenia. On November 7, 2025, Turkey issued arrest warrants for genocide against Netanyahu and 36 colleagues. Colombia initially supported the case, but withdrew its support to the case to restore the Colombia–Israel relations.

The Organisation of Islamic Cooperation (OIC), the Arab League, and the African Union have collectively endorsed the characterisation of Israel's actions as genocide and called for accountability and measures such as ending arms transfers. In January 2025, the Hague Group convened in Bogotá with the aim to uphold international rulings on Gaza, end arms shipments to Israel and build a pathway to broader recognition of Palestinian statehood.

=== Non-governmental organisations and intergovernmental organisations ===
Numerous non-governmental organisations and intergovernmental organisations have accused Israel of genocide. Among the first to warn of a risk of genocide, in mid-October 2023, were Genocide Watch and the Lemkin Institute for Genocide Prevention. Several Palestinian human rights groups, including Defence for Children International (DCI), Al-Haq, Al Mezan, and the Palestinian Centre for Human Rights, have filed lawsuits alleging a genocide. Some Israeli human rights organisations, such as B'Tselem and Physicians for Human Rights–Israel, released reports calling Israel's campaign in Gaza a genocide. International human rights groups condemning Israel's genocide include the International Federation for Human Rights, Euro-Mediterranean Human Rights Monitor, Amnesty International, the European Center for Constitutional and Human Rights, and Human Rights Watch. In October 2024, Oxfam and 37 other humanitarian organisations warned that Israel was failing to comply with the Genocide Convention as it wiped Northern Gaza "off the map". Médecins Sans Frontières (MSF) has also found that Israel is committing genocide. The American activist group Jewish Voice for Peace has said that Israel is committing genocide.

In September 2025, the UN Human Rights Council's Independent International Commission of Inquiry issued a report concluding that Israel is committing genocide against Palestinians in Gaza. The Commission found reasonable grounds to determine that Israeli authorities and security forces have committed, and continue to commit, four of the five genocidal acts defined under the 1948 Genocide Convention: killing members of the group; causing serious bodily or mental harm; deliberately inflicting conditions of life calculated to bring about the group's physical destruction in whole or in part; and imposing measures intended to prevent births.

== Cultural discourse ==
Israel's genocide against the Palestinian people in Gaza has been a contentious topic in cultural discourse. Celebrities, athletes, public intellectuals, activists, cultural institutions and ordinary people have weighed in on the events in Gaza, as well as on the cultural and societal implications of viewing those events through the framework of genocide.

=== Public opinion on Israel's actions in Gaza ===
Multiple surveys have found broad support among Jewish Israelis for the government's policies toward Gaza. An August 2025 Accord Center poll found that 76% of Jewish Israelis agreed with the statement "there are no innocent people in Gaza". A May 2025 survey found that 82% supported expelling Gazans, while 56% favoured also expelling Palestinians from Israel. Another August 2025 poll found that 79% of Jewish Israelis were untroubled by reports of famine in Gaza. According to the Lemkin Institute for Genocide Prevention, "the vast majority of Israelis agree with...[Israel's] plan and clearly will support anything to see it realized – from apartheid to extermination."

An August 2025 poll found that half of U.S. voters believed Israel was committing genocide in Gaza and 60% opposed further military assistance. A September 2025 AP-NORC poll found that the number of Americans who believe that Israel's military actions in Gaza have "gone too far" was increasing.

An October 2025 Washington Post poll found that most American Jews believe Israel is committing war crimes and 39% believe it is committing genocide. A Quinnipiac poll found that 50% of U.S. voters believe Israel is committing genocide in Gaza, including 77% of Democrats, while 64% of Republicans disagree. Additionally, 60% of voters oppose sending more U.S. military aid to Israel, with 37% sympathizing more with Palestinians and 36% with Israelis.

== Impact ==
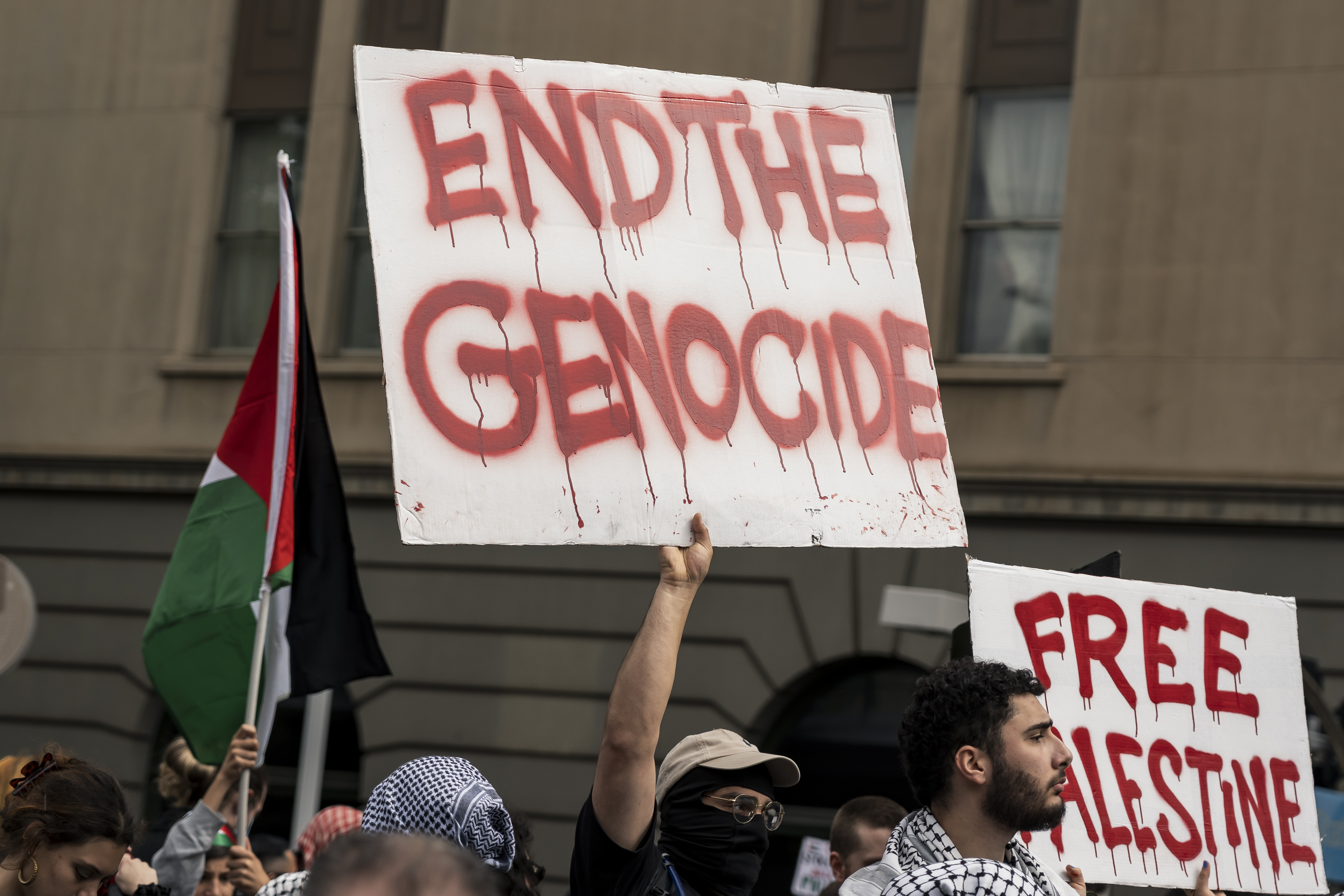
Millions of people around the world protested Israel's actions, many of them explicitly calling for the recognition and cessation of genocide.

British sociologist Martin Shaw has called the Gaza genocide "the genocide that changed the world" because of mass mobilisation against genocide. He also highlights some political victories by Israel, but "at huge cost to its global legitimacy and that of the West". Israeli journalist and author Gideon Levy wrote an article in Haaretz insisting that the people of Gaza will never forget the massacres, bombardments, destruction, and trauma.

Scholars, experts, and other commentators have described Gaza as the "graveyard of international law". Some scholars, particularly those associated with Third World approaches to international law, have argued that the international community's failure to treat Israel's actions in Gaza as a genocide and respond accordingly has harmed the principles of the international order and international law and exposed the deficiencies of international governance. José Manuel Barreto argues that "the Palestinian genocide has unveiled the deep colonial structure of the international legal order", placing the Gaza genocide in a long list of colonial genocides the international system has tolerated. Historian Mark LeVine argues that Israel's actions have destroyed respect for international law and weakened the taboo against large-scale violence in response to perceived threats.

Dutch lawyer and professor of international law André Nollkaemper has said that the United States' rejection of international law is a unique feature of the Gaza war. The journalist Colin Jones interviewed lawyers affiliated with the US military and concluded that they see Gaza as a test case for what military conduct might be acceptable in a hypothetical war between the US and a peer power such as China.

During the 2026 Iran war, Benjamin Netanyahu and Itamar Ben-Gvir both made references to Amalek. According to Séamus Malekafzali, this represents an extension of Israel's "genocidal logic" from Gaza to its war on Iran. In The Guardian, Ben Reiff warned that after "the world failed to prevent genocide in Gaza", Israel will employ similar tactics in the 2026 Lebanon war. Sonia Boulos and Raz Segal write that the US and Israel's war on Iran "underlines how genocidal regimes pose a threat on a global scale."

== See also ==
- Allegations of genocide in the October 7 attacks – Characterization of Hamas atrocities
- Casualties of the Gaza war
- Comparisons between Israel and Nazi Germany
- Effect of the Gaza war on children in the Gaza Strip
- Gaza genocide denial
- Gaza Strip mass graves – Mass graves found during the Gaza war
- Gaza–Israel conflict – Part of the Israeli–Palestinian conflict
- Human rights violations against Palestinians by Israel
- Israeli war crimes in the Gaza war – Violations of laws of war
- List of genocides
- Dehumanization of Palestinians in Israeli discourse
- Timeline of the Gaza war
