= Academic and legal responses to the Gaza genocide =

Scholarly and legal assessments of the Gaza genocide

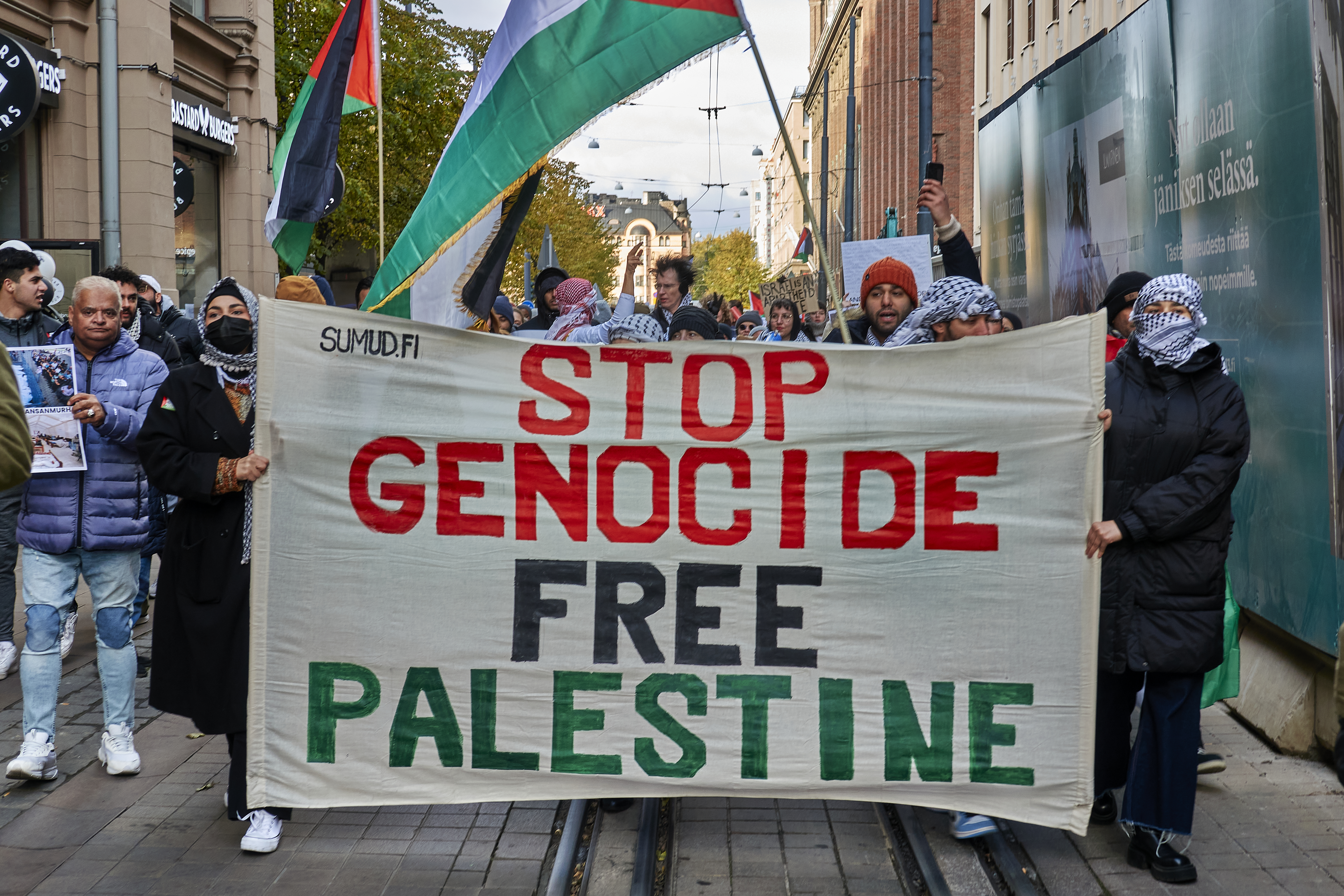
"Stop the genocide, free Palestine" rally in Helsinki, Finland, 21 October 2023

Numerous scholars and legal experts have made assessments of the conduct of Israel in the Gaza genocide. Since late 2023, a growing number of experts have accused the Israeli government of committing genocide in Gaza, including within the fields of genocide studies, Holocaust studies, history, and international law.

In late 2023, the Canadian Broadcasting Corporation reported that "A growing number of academics, legal scholars and governments are accusing the Israeli government of carrying out a genocide". In December 2024, MSNBC anchorman Ayman Mohyeldin and his producer Basel Hamdan said "a growing list of genocide scholars and international law experts" describe Israeli actions as genocide.

== Academic assessments ==
There is a growing consensus among genocide and Holocaust scholars, international legal experts, human rights organisations, and governments that Israel's actions in Gaza constitute genocide. Israel and its supporters deny the accusation.

=== Genocide studies scholars ===
In November 2023, sociologist and genocide expert Martin Shaw said that states avoid the term genocide to avoid their responsibility to end it; moreover, he suggested, Israel avoids the term out of "a misplaced belief that Jews, having been prime historical victims of genocide, cannot also be its perpetrators".

In January 2024, in response to the public split in the field of genocide studies, the Journal of Genocide Research, edited by A. Dirk Moses, launched its new forum "Israel-Palestine: Atrocity Crimes and the Crisis of Holocaust and Genocide Studies". In his article, Shaw noted that while the application of the framework of genocide to Palestine had, in the words of one commentator, "habitually evoked fanatical pushback", the nature of Israel's assault on Gaza "represented a strategic choice" rather than an inadvertent consequence, and thus calling it genocide was both warranted and inescapable.

In her contribution to the journal, Zoé Samudzi, a sociologist and Visiting assistant professor of Genocide Studies and Genocide Prevention at the Strassler Centre for Holocaust and Genocide Studies at Clark University, said that Israel's actions in Gaza arguably included "nearly every act outlined in Article II" of the Genocide Convention, but that the extent of its actions and its "legal impunity" meant it was better understood through Lemkin's original, more comprehensive definition of genocide. Samudzi and another contributor affiliated with the Strassler Center, Elyse Semerdjian, called Israel's attacks on infrastructure, food, and water genocidal. In his contribution, the genocide scholar Uğur Ümit Üngör said that Israel's actions were a form of "subaltern genocide", in which violence by a weaker party (Hamas) is met with disproportionate retaliation by the stronger party (Israel), culminating in genocide.

In February 2024, Abdelwahab El-Affendi, Professor of Politics at Doha Institute for Graduate Studies, said that among the scholars who took part in the Journal of Genocide Research forum, "there was uneven worry about the health of the field", but that there was "near consensus" that Israel's actions on Gaza were "certainly 'genocidal' if not outright genocide". He said, however, that "the increasing polarisation and partisanship in the field", along with the complicity and denial of "major democracies", struck a "very serious blow to the whole endeavour of genocide prevention".

Holocaust scholar Shmuel Lederman said that from mid-2024 there was broad agreement among those genocide scholars who expressed views on this that Israel's actions constitute genocide.

In May 2025, NRC wrote that leading scholars in genocide studies are "surprisingly unanimous" that Israel is committing genocide. In an interview with NOS, Martijn Eickhoff, the director of the NIOD Institute for War, Holocaust and Genocide Studies, said that the denial of access to food for Gazans is potentially genocidal, and highlighted the increasing rates of hunger and food insecurity in Gaza as genocidal violence. In June 2025, Melanie O'Brien, a professor and president of the International Association of Genocide Scholars (IAGS), said that, according to international law, Israel is committing genocide. She has also said that international law does not provide a defence against genocide, even in self-defence.

On 31 August 2025, the IAGS, the world's biggest academic association of genocide scholars, passed a resolution saying that Israel has committed genocide in Gaza. O'Brien called the resolution a "definitive statement from experts in the field of genocide studies that what is going on on the ground in Gaza is genocide". It is the ninth time since its 1994 founding that the IAGS has passed a resolution recognising an ongoing or historical genocide. Some members criticised the process and evidentiary basis of the IAGS resolution. Genocide scholar Sara Brown said the leadership declined to hold a virtual town hall discussion that she described as standard for controversial resolutions, restricted dissenting views on the association's listserv, and did not disclose the names of the resolution's drafters; she called the process "an embarrassing absence of professionalism". Critics also questioned the representativeness of the vote, noting that only about 26% of members participated (129 votes out of around 500 members). IAGS president Melanie O'Brien said the turnout was typical for IAGS resolutions and that voting is conducted by email under the bylaws; the association also defended anonymous balloting and stated that similar votes usually draw 25-34% participation.

In response, the Academic Engagement Network, which seeks to counter "denigration of Jewish and Zionist identities", published an open letter authored by Elliot Malin, founder and president of Alpine Strategies, urging the IAGS to retract the declaration. Titled "Scholars for Truth About Genocide", the letter was signed by several hundred people, including attorney Alan Dershowitz, and several Holocaust educators and survivors' children, and was promoted by pro-Israel figures such as UK Lawyers for Israel and Israel's Ministry of Foreign Affairs. It argued that the IAGS resolution contained significant errors, such as overlooking the role of Hamas, and that accusing Israel of genocide devalued the legal definition of genocide. The letter was subsequently found to feature some signatories whose names had been added without their consent, faked individuals, and the names of people who were not academics. The fact-checking website Misbar reported that there was no evidence of activity by Scholars for Truth About Genocide before the publishing of the letter; that the signatories to the letter included "some academics and experts in history, law, and the Holocaust" but "their numbers are very small compared to the total 514 signatories" which included political advocacy groups, individuals without relevant expertise like graphic designers, or odd entries like “CEO, Tel Aviv University"; and that the letter relied "on selective citations, omission, and misleading framing, falling short of the academic standards required to engage with the IAGS report."

In September 2025, David Simon, director of the Genocide Studies Program at Yale University, said there had been a surge in use of the word "genocide" in relation to Gaza, and that the "man-made famine" in Gaza had made it easier for people to read genocidal intent from Israel's actions. Jeffrey S. Bachman and Esther Brito Ruiz, an associate professor and adjunct instructor in Peace, Human Rights & Cultural Relations at American University also highlighted the use of starvation on the population of Gaza as definitive evidence of Israel perpetrating a genocide. That same month, Samudzi said that most experts now believed "annihilatory intent has rarely been more explicit than the repeated comments made by Israeli leadership in the progression of the state's aggression from the days after 7 October 2023".

==== Holocaust studies scholars ====
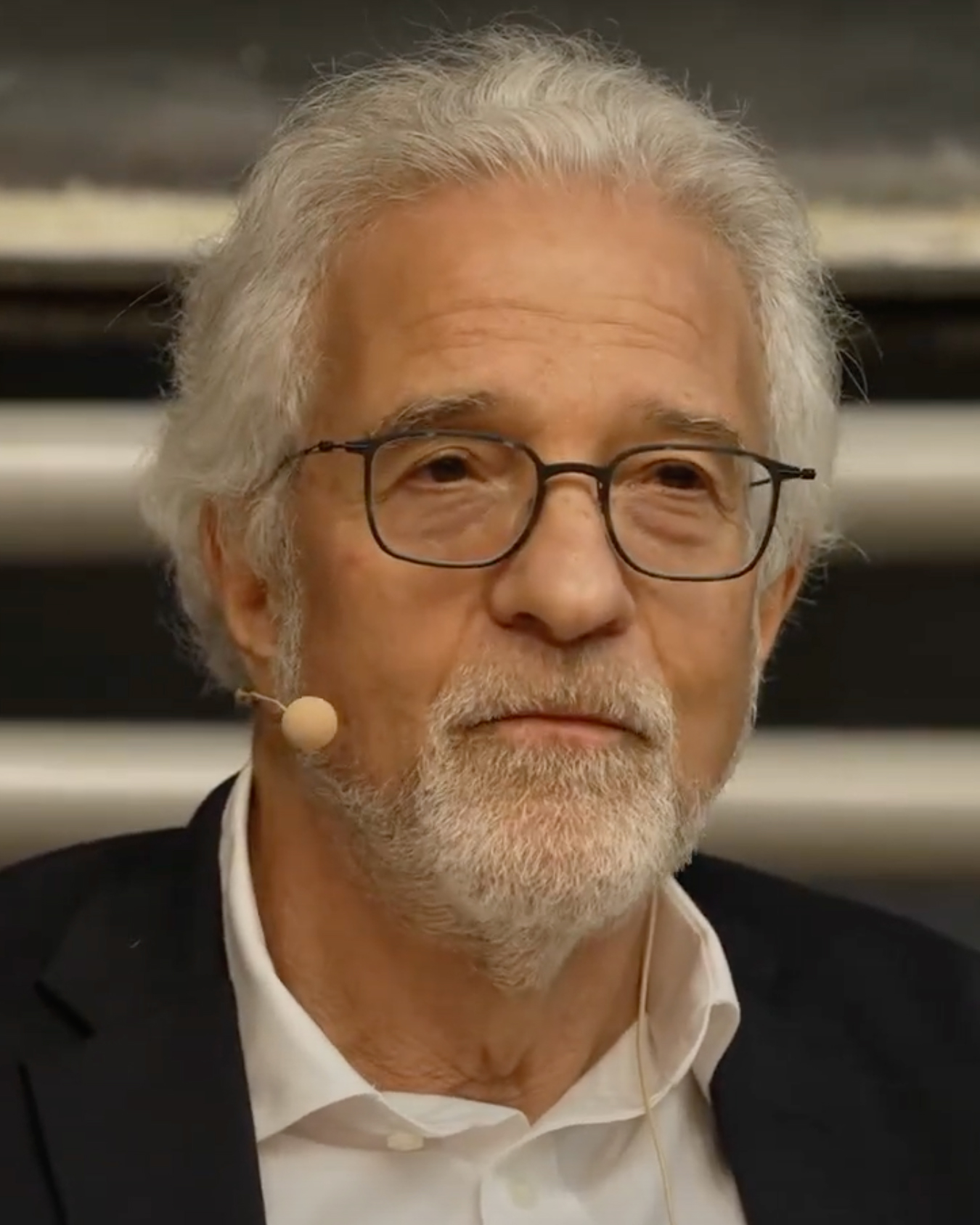
Omer Bartov, a leading Israeli-American Holocaust and genocide scholar who has written extensively about Israel's actions in Gaza

The debate has polarised the field of Holocaust studies, especially among American Holocaust studies centres. Many Holocaust scholars have said that Israel's actions should be analysed as a case of genocide, along with other genocides in history.

Early in the Gaza war, some scholars also defended Israeli violence, said that the genocide is not comparable to the uniqueness of the Holocaust, or said that the charge of genocide is based in antisemitism, in some cases comparing Hamas and Palestinians to Nazis—though many of these have not issued further statements as the war escalated. In May 2025, Uğur Ümit Üngör said, "the gap between Holocaust historians and their colleagues who view genocides in a broader context is shrinking".

In 2023, Omer Bartov expressed concern that Israeli leaders had genocidal intent. In response to Bartov, five Holocaust scholars, while acknowledging Israeli officials' "despicable statements that cannot be ignored", said that only a few officials made such statements and the scholars justified the statements by pointing to Hamas's crimes. The scholars argued that the dehumanising language was "not evidence of genocidal intent".

Bartov later said that, as of May 2024, it was "no longer possible to deny that Israel was engaged in systematic war crimes, crimes against humanity and genocidal actions", while noting that very few in Israel (apart from Palestinians) held this view. In July 2025, he confirmed his genocide assessment even though it was "a painful conclusion to reach", and wrote that the reluctance of many scholars of the Holocaust and Holocaust commemoration institutions to identify events in Gaza as a genocide threatens universalist interpretations of Holocaust studies and Holocaust commemoration and may lead to a decline in the relevance of Holocaust education.

Some scholars of Holocaust studies, such as Norman J. W. Goda and Jeffrey Herf, have said that Israel is not committing genocide. Goda has further argued that some images from Gaza have been staged, and that statements by Israeli officials which others argue show intent, have been "doctored".

In 2024, the Gross Foundation ceased funding the Center for Holocaust and Genocide Studies at Ramapo College in New Jersey, after its director, Jacob Labendz, said "dehumanization is the seedbed of genocide and ethnic war" in relation to comments made by Israeli officials. Lauren Gross said, "Frankly, it is better that [the center] gets shut down because a Holocaust center should not be made to showcase Palestinian and Islamic professors criticizing Israel."

In January 2024, Israeli Holocaust scholar Shmuel Lederman said Israel's actions amounted to "genocidal violence" rather than "genocide", and critiqued the ways genocidal intent were simplified in academic and legal discourse. In September 2025, he clarified his earlier position and said he now considers Israel's actions in Gaza to be genocide, and that he has held this view since April 2024. Lederman also recommended that the definition of intent in genocide be reinterpreted, as proposed by Ireland, "to include the foreseeable consequences of a given policy when its meaning is the genocidal destruction of a group or a severe harm to it as a group—a knowledge-based rather than purpose-based concept of genocide". He suggests this will provide a framework for analysing the "structural nature of genocidal dynamics", rather than focussing on the "obscure mental states" of individuals. Lederman, alongside others, locates the Gaza genocide within a long and ongoing history of oppression, including mass surveillance, collective punishment, restrictions on travel and work, and settler-colonialism.

Amos Goldberg has said that Israel's actions in Gaza exhibit all the elements of genocide, citing explicit intent by high-ranking officials, widespread incitement, and pervasive dehumanisation of Palestinians in Israeli society. Goldberg has also accused mainstream Holocaust studies of abandoning universal human rights and becoming an "enabling factor" of the genocide. Daniel Blatman agreed with the genocide assessment.

=== Historians ===
In November 2023, Italian historian Enzo Traverso said Israel's actions in Gaza had the "hallmarks" of genocide and should be stopped, while criticising the Hamas attacks as "an appalling massacre that nothing can justify". He also said the memory of the Holocaust should not be instrumentalised to justify the genocide. On 1 October 2024, he published Gaza Faces History, in which he confirmed that he thought Israel was committing genocide according to the Genocide Convention.

In January 2024, the historian Mark Levene said Israel's actions were ethnic cleansing at the very least, in line with the Israeli intelligence ministry's policy paper for a forcible and permanent transfer of all Gazans, supported by Benjamin Netanyahu's government. Levene also argued that Israel's actions and its politicians' statements show that it is engaging in genocide. The historian Donald Bloxham wrote that he was uninterested in the debate as "it makes no moral difference", though felt "much of what has transpired is eminently consistent with genocide".

In February 2024, the Holocaust historian Tal Bruttmann responded to Traverso's earlier comments, saying the historian lacked the relevant expertise and that it was flawed to assume genocidal intent based on the devastation of the war, but did not rule out the possibility that Israel had committed war crimes. He said the Israeli government's "statements and political will" had contributed to misperceptions, and criticised it for engaging in a war "without any real objective" or "any reflection on the future".

In April 2024, historian and political scientist Tetsuya Sahara wrote that the scale of violence in Gaza had already exceeded that seen in cases of ethnic cleansing, such as in Bosnia and Armenia, and that with the combination of discourse from Israeli leadership, systematic targeting of the civilian population, and the deteriorating conditions of life in Gaza could lead to a "full-fledged genocide if unchecked".

Palestinian historian Rashid Khalidi has described the Gaza genocide as a continuation of the Nakba in what he has described as a "hundred years' war on Palestine."

In May 2024, the Israeli historian Ilan Pappé said, "What we see now are massacres which are part of the genocidal impulse, namely to kill people in order to downsize the number of people living in Gaza." He said genocide had become the primary means to take "as much of Palestine as possible, with as few Palestinians in it as possible".

In June 2024, Israeli historian Yoav Di-Capua said a "genocidal mindset" was pervasive among settler communities and politicians in Israel, often mirroring Hamas' own genocidal ideology. He charted the history of this ideology among Israel's "ultra-orthodox Zionist nationalists", or Hardal, from the 1970s up to the Gaza war, and its influence on the politics of Netanyahu's government, particularly Bezalel Smotrich and Itamar Ben-Gvir. According to Di-Capua, this genocidal ideology included Jewish supremacy and a desire for maximalist territorial expansion across the biblical Land of Israel. Di-Capua described Netanyahu as a "political captive" of Hardal, saying he had "echoed" their rhetoric of "eradication". He said Smotrich and Ben-Gvir seek the adoption of this ideology as national policy and are using the Gaza war to implement their plan.

In January 2025, Israeli historian Benny Morris contended that Israel was not committing genocide, but said that genocide against Palestinians was possible in the future unless certain steps were taken. Raz Segal said Jewish supremacism plays a role in the Gaza genocide and Israel's settler colonialism.

In January 2025, the members of the American Historical Association voted to condemn Israel's actions in Gaza, saying that Israel had "effectively obliterated Gaza's education system".

In July 2025, a group of Israeli military historians from the Begin–Sadat Center for Strategic Studies published a report titled Debunking the Genocide Allegations. The authors argue that available evidence does not demonstrate an Israeli policy or intent to destroy Gaza's Palestinian population. They dispute allegations of deliberate starvation, systematic civilian targeting, indiscriminate bombing, and commonly cited casualty statistics, claiming that weak source verification, circular citations, uncertain data, and an “inverse information funnel” have created a misleading appearance of independent confirmation. The report emphasizes Gaza's exceptionally difficult urban-warfare conditions, Hamas's tunnels and use of civilian infrastructure, and Israeli warnings and evacuations, while acknowledging that individual attacks may have involved negligence, inadequate precautions, criminal conduct, or war crimes requiring investigation. It particularly criticizes the March 2025 suspension of humanitarian aid and highlights the killing of paramedics in Tel al-Sultan as a serious incident warranting scrutiny. Although challenging Gaza Health Ministry figures, it concedes that no definitive alternative casualty count is currently available. Ultimately, the authors recommend greater reliance on primary and forensic evidence, comparison of competing accounts, transparent acknowledgment of uncertainty, and caution in applying the term “genocide.”

In January 2026, art historian Simon Schama said that Israel is not committing genocide.

=== Other scholars ===
Answers to the question "How would you define Israel's military campaign in Gaza?" among Middle East scholars in a January–February 2025 survey
1. Genocide (46.0%)
2. Major war crimes akin to genocide (36.0%)
3. Major war crimes but not akin to genocide (9.00%)
4. Unjustified actions but not major war crimes (4.00%)
5. Justified actions under the right to self-defense (4.00%)
6. I don't know (2.00%)

Multiple public declarations from journals and academic organisations have warned of a potential genocide and declared opposition to an ongoing genocide.

At the end of October 2023, writing in the French political website AOC Media, anthropologist Didier Fassin compared Israel's actions in Gaza to the Herero and Nama genocide. The Holocaust historian Tal Bruttmann, the sociologist Luc Boltanski, and others have criticised Fassin's arguments, calling his analogy to German colonialism inappropriate. Israeli sociologist Eva Illouz also criticised Fassin, arguing that there was clear evidence that there was no intent on Israel's part and therefore the term genocide is incorrect. In response to these critiques and others, Fassin highlighted three rhetorical formations that he says have repeatedly occurred: presenting 7 October 2023 as the beginning of events, ignoring any history before that; hyperbolic claims; and distortion.

On 13 November 2023, the German social theorist Jürgen Habermas and three colleagues at Goethe University Frankfurt published a statement in which they said that attributing genocidal intent to Israel's actions in Gaza was a misjudgement, triggering public debate in Germany.

Literary scholar Saree Makdisi has highlighted the continuity between the Gaza genocide and Zionism and the 1948 Palestinian expulsions.

In December 2023, in correspondence published in The Lancet, multiple specialists in international medicine and humanitarian aid reiterated warnings of the risk of genocide, while detailing how Israel's blocking of humanitarian support and aid were leading to unnecessary deaths and how the death rate would continue to worsen. They called on signatories to the Genocide Convention to enforce a ceasefire on Israel.

Middle eastern studies scholar Joseph Massad has situated the Gaza genocide within broader frameworks of colonialism and colonial violence and has argued that the goal of the Gaza genocide is demographic: "to safeguard the Jewish settler-colony of Israel by restoring the lost Jewish demographic majority, which had been achieved through mass killings and expulsions since 1948."

In January 2024, the British Society for Middle Eastern Studies published an open letter to the UK government citing the "indiscriminate targeting of the Palestinian education system" and calling on the government to condemn Israel's actions.

In March 2024, the Middle East Studies Association condemned the "accelerating scale of genocidal violence being inflicted on the Palestinian population of Gaza", saying that Israel's conduct constituted cultural genocide. A May–June 2024 Brookings Institution survey asked 758 Middle East scholars to define Israel's current military actions in Gaza; the most frequent response was "major war crimes akin to genocide"; next was "genocide". The two responses together made up a strong majority. In January–February 2025, a follow-up survey indicated a growing consensus that Israel's military campaign in Gaza was genocide.

In June 2024, the Association française des anthropologues published an editorial in their journal, Journal des Anthropologues, concluding that Israel was committing a genocide in Gaza, and highlighting how many of the actions taken had previously been detailed in previous plans for the seizure of the Gaza strip and its integration into Israel.

In March 2025, Israel studies scholar Dov Waxman publicly reversed his position on the genocide, saying that Israel's termination of the ceasefire, blocking of international aid, and renewed attacks on Gaza convinced him that Israel was deliberately committing genocide.

In July 2025, 1,300 professionals and academics in public health, health care, and the social sciences signed a letter calling for academic acknowledgement of the Gaza genocide. In July, peace studies scholar Ernesto Verdeja wrote that even by "the most inflexible interpretation of genocide, Gaza qualifies as genocidal".

In May 2025 the International Sociological Association published a joint statement where they called for an " end to the genocide in Gaza and escalating violence in the West Bank" and an "end to apartheid-like conditions" that Palestinians live under.

Writing in August 2025, political scientist Clemens Heni said that while "there are massive war crimes in Gaza, committed by the IDF, including hunger policies and the intentional shooting of civilians" there was no genocide occurring in Gaza, and called those making the claim that there is a genocide "anti-Semites".

In September 2025, the right-wing Israeli think-tank Begin–Sadat Center for Strategic Studies, published a report stating that Israel had not committed genocide in Gaza. While critiquing certain actions by the IDF, the scholars associated with the report said that allegations of genocidal activities were based on faulty data and methodology. None of the authors of the report are genocide experts. One of the authors teaches at the Command and Staff College of the Israeli military. Iva Vukusic, a Utrecht University assistant professor of international history and genocide scholar, said the report does not negate evidence of genocide. Alex de Waal, a professor at Tufts University, wrote that the report is highly selective, dismisses well-documented facts by making claims without evidence, and contains inaccurate claims about the Gaza Strip famine. The newspaper Haaretz and +972 Magazine characterise the report as part of the pattern of genocide denial or atrocity denial in Israeli media and academic discourse.

Literary scholar Rebecca Gould wrote in September 2025 on scholasticide and genocidal epistemicide in Palestine that "the targeted nature of Israeli attacks on education – on the very possibility of a Palestinian future in Gaza – has gone beyond anything that has previously been seen in Palestine."

In 2026, philosopher and skeptic Maarten Boudry wrote in The Jewish Chronicle that "In reality, the accusation of genocide is as obscene as it is absurd. Netanyahu and his far-right cronies may be guilty of many things, but there's no evidence whatsoever that Israel intends to exterminate Gazans, and abundant evidence to the contrary".

== Legal assessments ==
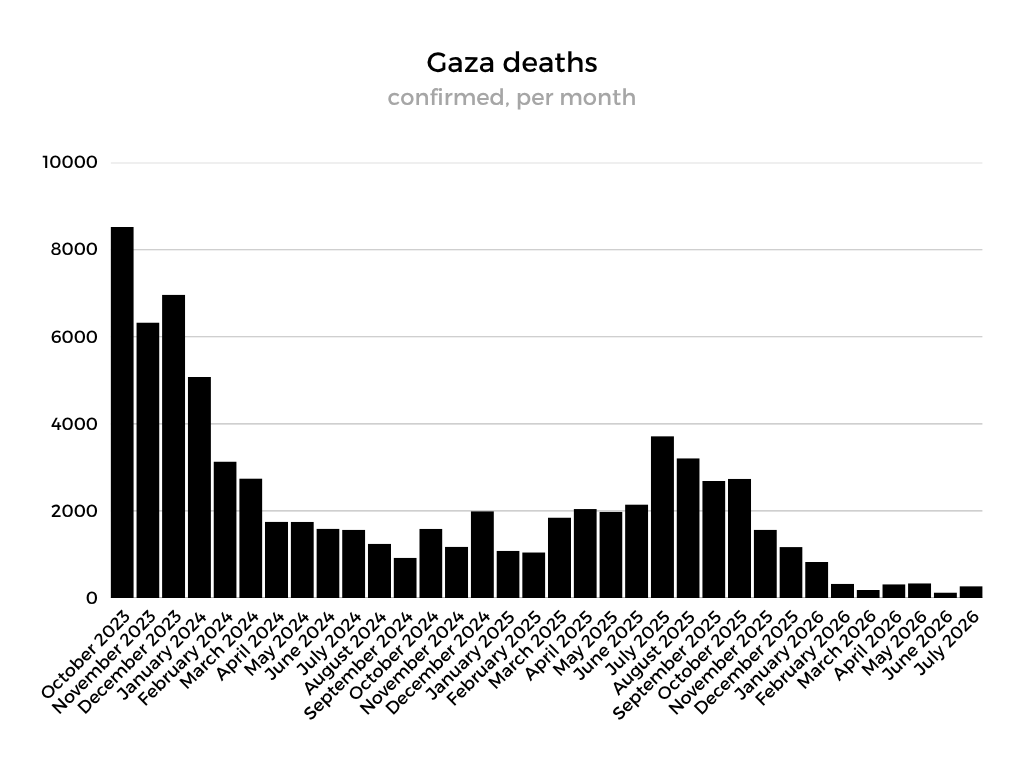
Gaza war deaths by month

A month into the Gaza war, in November 2023, three American genocide scholars—Victoria Sanford, a professor of anthropology at Lehman College; Barry Trachtenberg, a professor of history at Wake Forest University; and John Cox, an associated professor of history at University of North Carolina—submitted evidence to the Defense for Children International – Palestine et al v. Biden et al legal case, detailing similarities between statements Israeli government officials and ministers made and those made during the genocides in Guatemala, Rwanda, Bosnia, Darfur, northern Iraq, and Myanmar. The court dismissed the case on 31 January 2024, ruling that while "it is plausible that Israel's conduct amounts to genocide", US foreign policy was a political question, over which courts lacked jurisdiction.

In November 2023, the scholar David Crane argued that Netanyahu had not expressly stated an intent to destroy Palestinians, and that it could therefore not be considered a genocide. In December 2023, Luis Moreno Ocampo, former chief prosecutor of the International Criminal Court, told Al Jazeera that the siege of Gaza was a form of genocide due to Israel's imposing conditions that would lead to the deaths of Palestinians. That same month, Kai Ambos, a professor and judge at the Kosovo Special Tribunal, warned that statements by politicians, while potentially beneficial for proving intent, could not necessarily be applied in evaluating military decisions.

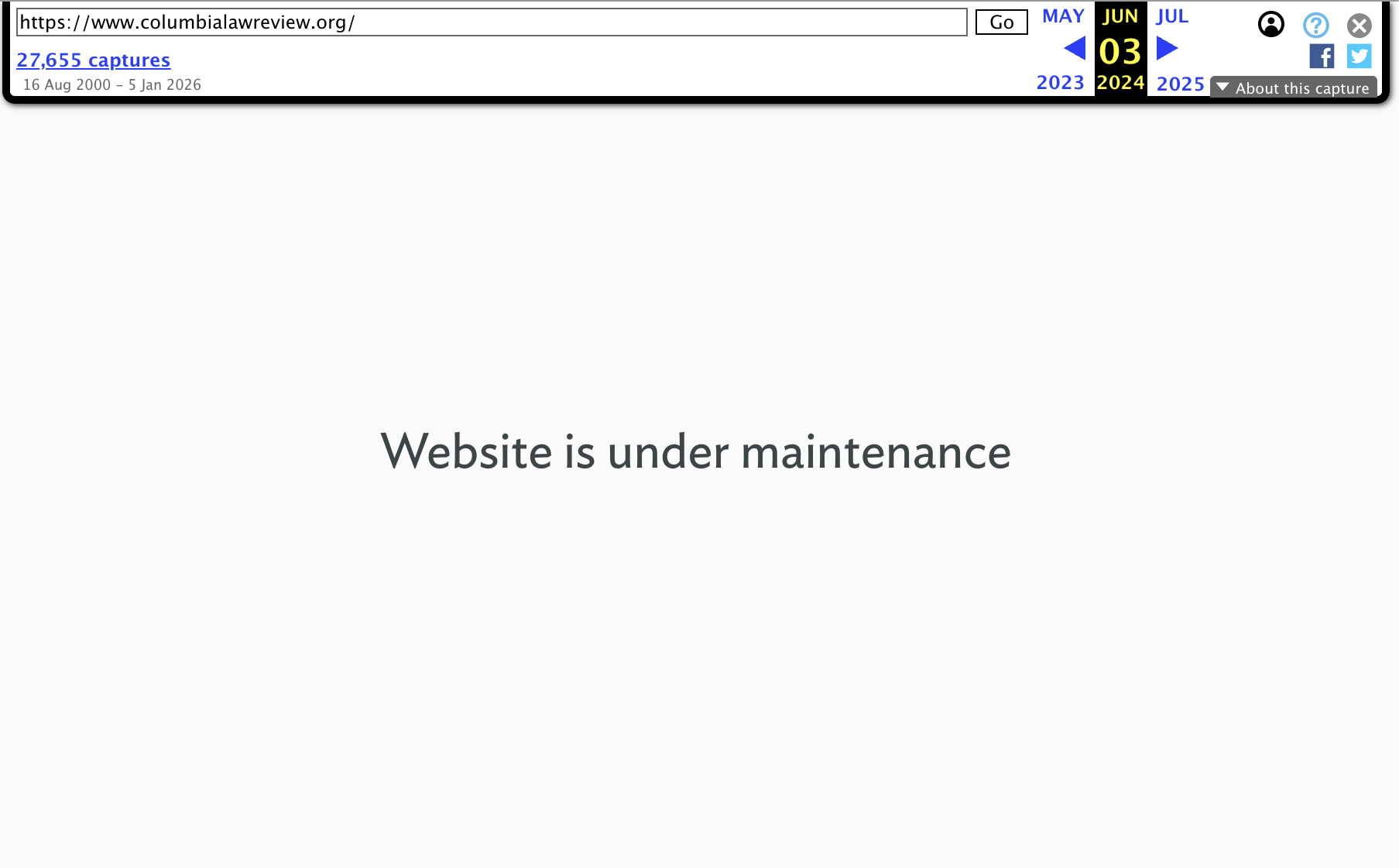
The board of directors of the Columbia Law Review took down its entire website hours after its editorial staff published Toward Nakba as a Legal Concept by Rabea Eghbariah. The website was reinstated after a 20–5 majority of staff editors voted to strike.

Legal scholar Rabea Eghbariah has contextualized the Gaza genocide within the ongoing Nakba and argued that "the denial of the genocide in Gaza is rooted in the denial of the Nakba." Legal scholar Noura Erakat has also emphasised the continuity of the Gaza genocide within broader dynamics through the lens of international law.

On 3 January 2024, a number of prominent Israelis, represented by the human-rights lawyer Michael Sfard, sent Israel's attorney general and state prosecutor an open letter detailing examples of "the discourse of annihilation, expulsion and revenge". The signatories said that the Israeli judiciary was ignoring incitement to genocide in Gaza. On 12 January 2024, Christian Walter, a professor at LMU Munich, said the extent of harm to both civilians and infrastructure were inconclusive, and that attempts to evacuate civilians were an indication against genocidal intent.

On 28 January 2024, the Israeli lawyer Eugene Kontorovich called the genocide allegations "absolutely absurd" and called for Israel to end its acceptance of the ICJ's jurisdiction in response to South Africa's case. In April 2024, the scholar Stefan Talmon told Süddeutsche Zeitung that Israel was not committing genocide in Gaza, but said Israel had committed war crimes. Der Spiegel pointed out that Talmon had a conflict of interest on this matter; he also represents Myanmar in the Rohingya genocide case, and has a professional interest in a narrower definition of genocide. In January 2025, legal scholar Samuel Estreicher made the same arguments, that it was not a case of genocide, but that Israel's actions were commensurate with war crimes or crimes against humanity.

On 9 May 2024, SOAS legal scholar Nimer Sultany said there is a growing consensus among legal and international law scholars that Israel's actions constitute genocide. On 15 May, a report by the University Network for Human Rights, Boston University School of Law, Cornell Law School, University of Pretoria, and the Yale Law School found that "Israel has committed genocidal acts". On the same day, professor Andreas Müller said that the term "genocide" was being used as a criticism instead of according to its legal definition, adding, "there was no sufficient ground of genocide if one takes the legal term seriously".

In an article for SRF News on 20 May 2024, professors Marco Sassoli and Oliver Diggelmann said that some statements by politicians may be genocidal, but that this did not necessarily apply to the actions of the Israeli military. Diggelmann said he did not believe there would be evidence of genocidal intent.

On 26 May 2024, the Human Rights Watch co-founder Aryeh Neier said Israel's blocking of aid and the subsequent starvation of Gaza's population is indicative of genocide. On 1 June 2024, professor of international law Daniel-Erasmus Khan said there was no clear evidence of a special intent among Israeli leadership. This has been supported by other legal scholars who have also argued that there presently is not enough evidence to determine that this is a case of genocide.

In June 2024, human rights lawyer Susan Akram said, "The opposition [to designating Israel's war in Gaza a genocide] is political, as there is consensus amongst the international human rights legal community, many other legal and political experts, including many Holocaust scholars, that Israel is committing genocide in Gaza". The same month, Sultany supported Forensic Architecture's assessment that Israel had weaponised international humanitarian law into "humanitarian violence". This was supported in July by professor of international law Neve Gordon and the anthropologist Nicola Perugini, who argued that Israel used "the law itself as a tool legitimizing genocide". All three highlighted particularly Israel's claim that Hamas uses human shields is being used as a "legal justification for genocide".

Also in June 2024, William Schabas, an expert in international criminal law, said that South Africa's case was "arguably the strongest case of genocide ever brought before the" International Court of Justice. He cited the destruction of Gazan infrastructure and statements made by Israeli politicians that Gazans are "human animals" and that Israel would deny them electricity, water, and medical care. Mia Swart, a visiting professor at University of the Witwatersrand, also said that the South African case led to an ever-growing consensus in international law circles that Israel's actions constitute genocide.

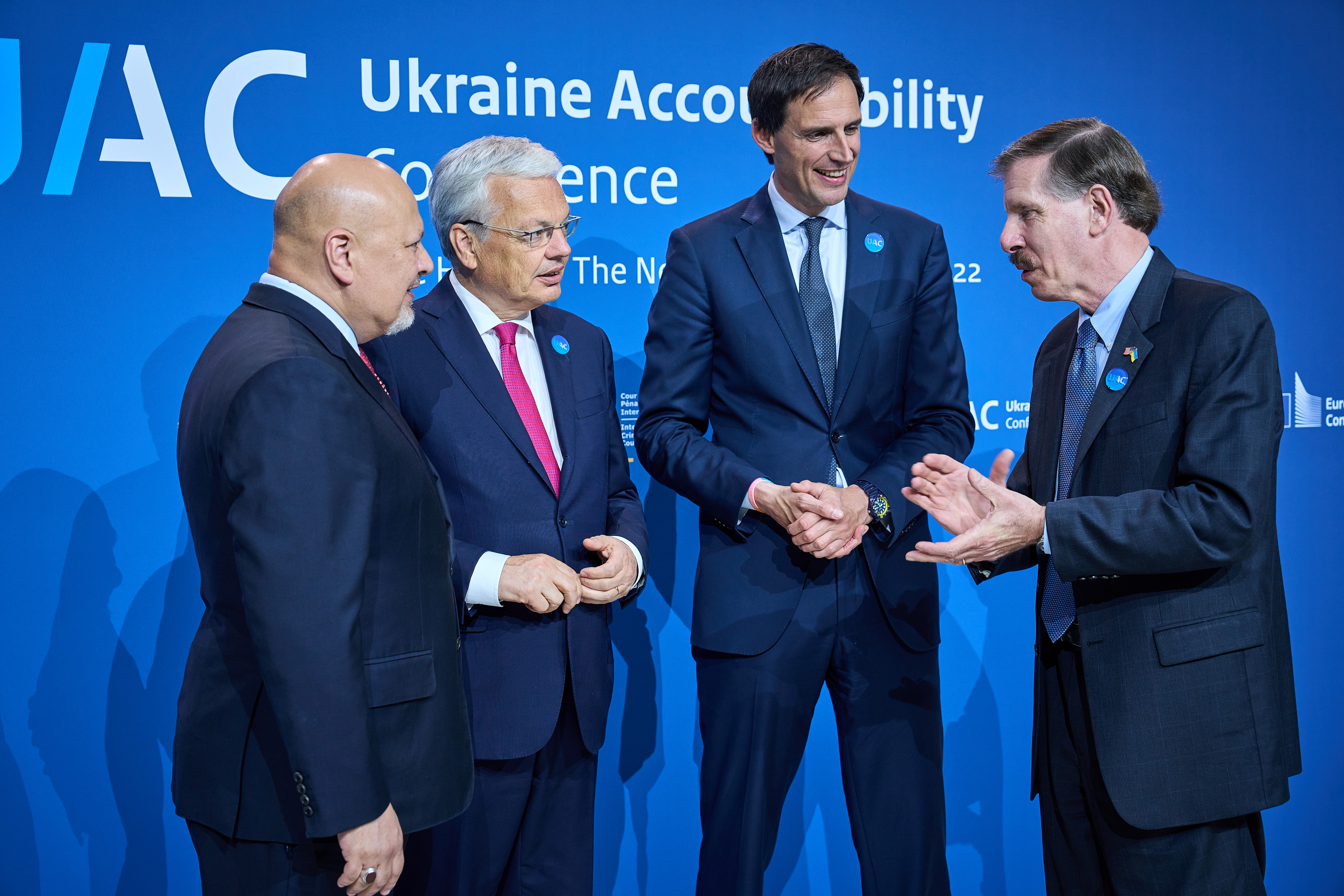
Eli Rosenbaum (right) meeting Karim Khan, Didier Reynders, and Wopke Hoekstra at the Ukraine Accountability Conference at The Hague in July 2022

On 4 July 2024, professor of law Sabine Swoboda said that although Israel may have broken international law, it did not fulfill the criteria for genocide because although officials had made inflammatory comments, genocidal intent was not the only explanation for them. In an op-ed in August 2024, Eli Rosenbaum, a lawyer and former director of the United States Department of Justice's Office of Special Investigations, wrote that Israel's actions in Gaza were not genocidal as it was aiming to "prevent genocide" by Hamas.

In a speech in October 2024, professor of human rights law Conor Gearty called Israel genocidal, pointing to the continued attacks on schools and hospitals and the lack of internal investigations by Israeli authorities into potential crimes. On 16 December 2024, professor of law Adil Ahmad Haque said that Amnesty's November 2024 report describes serious violations of international humanitarian law and that Amnesty "correctly applies existing law" based on "its extensive factual findings". Following the Amnesty report, Human Rights Watch accused Israel of "genocidal acts" in Gaza, but it did not say definitively whether genocidal intent existed.

In March 2025, Craig Mokhiber, a retired UN human rights lawyer, wrote, "Never, in the modern era, have we seen such a clear-cut, article-by-article violation of the United Nations Genocide Convention, so broad a consensus in the identification of the crime". In April 2025, the barrister Michael Mansfield said there was "no question" that genocide was occurring.

In May 2025, Luigi Daniele, a lecturer at Nottingham Law School, noted a link between the IDF's justification for its conduct in Gaza and the Rapid Support Forces rationale in the Sudanese civil war, saying it "reveals the emergence of a template to commit mass extermination and even genocide". In June 2025, Ambos and scholar Stefanie Bock wrote that it has become more difficult to deny genocidal intent.

In July 2025, Le Monde noted that legal experts remained divided on the question, with some supporting the genocide label and others rejecting it as unsubstantiated.

On 16 July 2025, former UK Supreme Court justice Jonathan Sumption said that a court would be likely to regard Israel's actions in Gaza as genocide due to Israel's explicit use of starvation as a weapon of war, the scale of human casualties and indiscriminate destruction in Gaza, and statements in support of forced displacement and ethnic cleansing by Benjamin Netanyahu, Israel Katz, Bezalel Smotrich, and Itamar Ben-Gvir. (Note: Sumption wrote: "The Israeli minister of national security, Itamar Ben-Gvir, is a long-standing advocate of ethnic cleansing. The finance minister, Bezalel Smotrich, is another. He announced at a public press conference on 6 May 2025, shortly after the decision to launch Operation Gideon's Chariots, that "Gaza will be entirely destroyed." He went on to explain that Palestinians would be herded into a Hamas-free zone, and from there would leave "in great numbers" to third countries. [...] A week after Smotrich's remarks, Netanyahu, giving evidence to a Knesset committee, reported that Israel was destroying more and more housing so that the population would have nowhere to return to and would have to leave Gaza. More recently, on 7 July, the defence minister, Israel Katz, briefed Israeli media that it was proposed to incarcerate Palestinians in a vast camp to be built on the ruins of Rafah, pending their departure for other countries.") He said: "The most plausible explanation of current Israeli policy is that its object is to induce Palestinians as an ethnic group to leave the Gaza Strip for other countries by bombing, shooting and starving them if they remain."

In September 2025, Sonia Boulos, a professor of international human rights law at Nebrija University in Spain, said that many prominent Israeli experts, as well as public figures outside Israel, had attempted to justify the Gaza genocide as an "imperfectly waged but just war", but that this was misleading. She also said that Israel's justification that Hamas uses civilians as human shields has effectively attempted to strip Palestinians of their civilian status.

== Global implications ==
Scholars associated with Third World approaches to international law, have argued that the international community's failure to treat Israel's actions in Gaza as a genocide and respond accordingly has harmed the principles of the international order and international law, and exposed the deficiencies of international governance. José Manuel Barreto argues that "the Palestinian genocide has unveiled the deep colonial structure of the international legal order" and identifies events in Gaza with the history of genocides in the colonised world, which he says the Westphalian system has historically failed to prevent.

Journalist Colin Jones interviewed lawyers affiliated with the US military and concluded that they see Gaza as a test case for what military conduct might be acceptable in a hypothetical future war between the US and a peer power such as China. Moustafa Bayoumi wrote, "Israel's acts of extermination and genocide of Palestinians in Gaza, funded and enabled at every turn by a complicit west, [have] contributed the most to the demise of the global, rules-based order."

== See also ==
- Gaza war protests at universities
- Reactions to the 2024 pro-Palestinian protests on university campuses
- Academic boycott of Israel
- Cultural discourse about the Gaza genocide
- Gaza genocide denial
- Intent and incitement in the Gaza genocide
- List of humanitarian groups accusing Israel of genocide in Gaza
- Gaza genocide recognition
- Palestinian genocide accusation#Academic discourse
- Palestinian genocide accusation#Legal discourse

== Bibliography ==
- El-Affendi, Abdelwahab (18 January 2024). "The Futility of Genocide Studies After Gaza". Journal of Genocide Research (Forum: Israel–Palestine: Atrocity Crimes and the Crisis of Holocaust and Genocide Studies): 1–7. doi:10.1080/14623528.2024.2305525.
- El-Affendi, Abdelwahab (3 February 2024). "Gaza and the dilemmas of genocide scholars". Al Jazeera. Archived from the original on 15 August 2024.
- Asem, Sondos (5 June 2025). "Israel committing genocide in Gaza, says top legal scholar Melanie O'Brien". Middle East Eye.
- Bachman, Jeffrey S.; Ruiz, Esther Brito (19 September 2025). "From East Timor to Gaza: How the United States Contributes to and Distances Itself from the Atrocities of Others (and How Genocide Studies Lets the United States Get Away with It)". Journal of Genocide Research (Roundtable: Gaza and Genocide Studies): 1–15. doi:10.1080/14623528.2025.2556592.
- Bartov, Omer (10 November 2023). "Opinion: What I Believe as a Historian of Genocide". The New York Times. ISSN 0362-4331. Archived from the original on 18 December 2023.
- Bartov, Omer (13 August 2024). "As a former IDF soldier and historian of genocide, I was deeply disturbed by my recent visit to Israel". The Guardian. Archived from the original on 14 August 2024.
- Bayoumi, Moustafa (6 July 2025). "The destruction of Palestine is breaking the world". The Guardian. ISSN 0261-3077. Archived from the original on 27 July 2025.
- van den Berg, Stephanie (1 September 2025). "Israel is committing genocide in Gaza, scholars' association says". Reuters.
- Bloxham, Donald (3 April 2025). "The 7 October Atrocities and the Annihilation of Gaza: Causes and Responsibilities". Journal of Genocide Research (Forum: Israel-Palestine: Atrocity Crimes and the Crisis of Holocaust and Genocide Studies): 1–26. doi:10.1080/14623528.2025.2483546.
- Boulos, Sonia (19 September 2025). "The 'G Word,' Liberal Israeli Elites, and the Prospect of Decolonization". Journal of Genocide Research (Roundtable: Gaza and Genocide Studies): 1–21. doi:10.1080/14623528.2025.2556564. ISSN 1462-3528.
- Bouranova, Alene (6 June 2024). "Is Israel Committing Genocide in Gaza? New Report from BU School of Law's International Human Rights Clinic Lays Out Case". Boston University. Archived from the original on 5 June 2024.
- B'Tselem (July 2025). Our Genocide (PDF) (Report). Archived (PDF) from the original on 30 July 2025.
- Burga, Solcyré (13 November 2023). "Is What's Happening in Gaza a Genocide? Experts Weigh In". Time. Archived from the original on 25 November 2023.
- Di-Capua, Yoav (5 June 2024). "Genocidal Mirroring in Israel/Palestine". Journal of Genocide Research (Forum: Israel–Palestine: Atrocity Crimes and the Crisis of Holocaust and Genocide Studies): 1–15. doi:10.1080/14623528.2024.2361978.
- Cohen, J. A. (2 July 2024). "The Law Cannot Let Itself See the Nakba". Jewish Currents.
- Cohen, Mari (19 December 2024). "Can Genocide Studies Survive a Genocide in Gaza?". Jewish Currents. Archived from the original on 16 May 2025.
- Corder, Mike (2 January 2024). "South Africa's genocide case against Israel sets up a high-stakes legal battle at the UN's top court". ABC News. Archived from the original on 7 January 2024.
- Corder, Mike; Quell, Molly (23 September 2025). "More experts see genocide in Israel's wartime conduct in Gaza". Associated Press. Archived from the original on 4 October 2025.
- Dumper, Michael; Badran, Amneh (2024). "Introduction". In Dumper, Michael; Badran, Amneh (eds.). Routledge Handbook on Palestine (1st ed.). Routledge. doi:10.4324/9781003031994. ISBN 9781003031994.
- Englert, Sai; Bhattacharyya, Gargi (1 October 2024). "Capital's Genocide: A Conversation on Racial Capitalism, Settler Colonialism, and Possible Worlds after Gaza". Journal of Holy Land and Palestine Studies. 23 (2): 165–186. doi:10.3366/hlps.2024.0337. hdl:1887/4177888. ISSN 2054-1988.
- Faddoul, Alix; Shannon, Geordan; Asghar, Khudejha; Boukari, Yamina; Smith, James; Neilson, Amy (18 December 2023). "The health dimensions of violence in Palestine: a call to prevent genocide". The Lancet. 403 (10421): 25–26. doi:10.1016/S0140-6736(23)02751-4. PMID 38128558. S2CID 266357297. Archived from the original on 21 December 2023.
- Fassin, Didier (5 February 2024). "The Rhetoric of Denial: Contribution to an Archive of the Debate about Mass Violence in Gaza". Journal of Genocide Research (Forum: Israel–Palestine: Atrocity Crimes and the Crisis of Holocaust and Genocide Studies): 1–7. doi:10.1080/14623528.2024.2308941.
- "Genocide Emergency: Gaza 11 July 2025". Genocide Watch. 14 July 2025. Archived from the original on 31 August 2025.
- Gessen, Masha (7 February 2024). "The Limits of Accusing Israel of Genocide". The New Yorker. Archived from the original on 7 February 2024.
- Goda, Norman; Herf, Jeffrey (3 June 2025). "Why it's wrong to call Israel's war in Gaza a 'genocide'". The Washington Post.
- Goldberg, Amos; Blatman, Daniel (16 January 2025). "amnam mah shemitrachesh be'aza eino Auschwitz, ach zu ota mishpacha — pesha hashmadat am" אמנם מה שמתרחש בעזה אינו אושוויץ, אך זו אותה משפחה — פשע השמדת עם [Although what is happening in Gaza is not Auschwitz, it is the same family – a crime of genocide.]. Haaretz (in Hebrew).
- Goldberg, Amos; Blatman, Daniel (30 January 2025). "There's No Auschwitz in Gaza. But It's Still Genocide". Haaretz.
- Gritten, David (14 March 2025). "UN experts accuse Israel of genocidal acts and sexual violence in Gaza". BBC News. Archived from the original on 15 March 2025.
- "IAGS Resolution on the Situation in Gaza" (PDF). International Association of Genocide Scholars. 31 August 2025. Archived (PDF) from the original on 2 September 2025.
- "International Expert Statement on Israeli State Crime". statecrime.org. International State Crime Initiative. 2023. Archived from the original on 6 January 2024.
- Klein, Shira (8 January 2025). "The Growing Rift between Holocaust Scholars over Israel/Palestine". Journal of Genocide Research (Forum: Israel-Palestine: Atrocity Crimes and the Crisis of Holocaust and Genocide Studies): 1–21. doi:10.1080/14623528.2024.2448061.
- Komnenic, Ana (2 December 2023). "Experts, advocates deeply divided on question of 'genocide' in Gaza". CBC News. Archived from the original on 9 September 2024.
- Johnson, Jake (18 October 2023). "800+ Legal Scholars Say Israel May Be Perpetrating 'Crime of Genocide' in Gaza". Common Dreams. Archived from the original on 22 November 2023.
- van Laarhoven, Kasper; Peek, Eva; Walters, Derk (14 May 2025). "Zeven gerenommeerde wetenschappers vrijwel eensgezind: Israël pleegt in Gaza genocide" [Seven renowned academics almost unanimously agree: Israel is committing genocide in Gaza]. NRC (in Dutch). Archived from the original on 15 May 2025.
- Lawless, Jill (12 July 2024). "Senior UK jurists have joined calls to stop arms sales to Israel. Other allies face similar pressure". Associated Press. Archived from the original on 26 July 2024.
- Lederman, Shmuel (29 January 2024). "Gaza as a Laboratory 2.0". Journal of Genocide Research (Forum: Israel-Palestine: Atrocity Crimes and the Crisis of Holocaust and Genocide Studies): 1–6. doi:10.1080/14623528.2024.2309706.
- Lederman, Shmuel (19 September 2025). "A Not So Textbook Case of Genocide". Journal of Genocide Research (Roundtable: Gaza and Genocide Studies): 1–12. doi:10.1080/14623528.2025.2556550. ISSN 1462-3528.
- "Statement on Why We Call the Israeli Attack on Gaza Genocide". Lemkin Institute for Genocide Prevention. 29 December 2023. Archived from the original on 20 August 2025.
- Levene, Mark (21 January 2024). "Gaza 2023: Words Matter, Lives Matter More". Journal of Genocide Research (Forum: Israel–Palestine: Atrocity Crimes and the Crisis of Holocaust and Genocide Studies): 1–7. doi:10.1080/14623528.2024.2301866. eISSN 1469-9494. Archived (PDF) from the original on 4 July 2024.
- Mohyeldin, Ayman; Hamdan, Basel (10 December 2024). "Why Amnesty International and other experts say Israel is committing genocide in Gaza". MSNBC. Archived from the original on 3 July 2025.
- Mokhiber, Craig (March 2025). "Law on trial: Gaza and the future of the international legal order". Dialectical Anthropology. 49 (1): 121–144. doi:10.1007/s10624-025-09764-0.
- Moses, A. Dirk (19 September 2025). "Introduction: Gaza and the Problems of Genocide Studies". Journal of Genocide Research (Roundtable: Gaza and Genocide Studies): 1–14. doi:10.1080/14623528.2025.2558401.
- Narea, Nicole; Samuel, Sigal (13 November 2023). "How to think through allegations of genocide in Gaza". Vox. Archived from the original on 24 November 2023.
- Narea, Nicole (25 October 2024). "Is Israel committing genocide? Reexamining the question, a year later". Vox.
- Nashed, Mat (5 May 2025). "How RSF is adopting Israel's 'template for genocide' in Sudan". Al Jazeera. Archived from the original on 6 May 2025.
- Nijim, Mohammed (8 October 2024). "Gazacide: Palestinians From Refugeehood to Ontological Obliteration". Critical Sociology. 51 (7–8): 1581–1603. doi:10.1177/08969205241286530.
- O'Brien, Melanie (4 August 2025). "Is Genocide Happening in Gaza?". Opinio Juris. Archived from the original on 27 September 2025.
- "UN Special Committee finds Israel's warfare methods in Gaza consistent with genocide, including use of starvation as weapon of war". OHCHR. 14 November 2024. Archived from the original on 8 May 2025.
- Polychroniou, C. J. (28 August 2025). "Israel's Conduct in Gaza Amounts to Genocidal Acts With an Intent to Commit Genocide". Global Policy Journal. Archived from the original on 29 August 2025.
- "Public Statement: Scholars Warn of Potential Genocide in Gaza" (Press release). Third World Approaches to International Law Review. 20 October 2023 [Statement released 15 October 2023]. Archived from the original on 23 November 2023.
- Quigley, John (3 July 2024). "The Lancet and Genocide By "Slow Death" in Gaza". Arab Center Washington DC. Archived from the original on 13 July 2024.
- Repo, Jemima (25 November 2024). "Genocide and the destruction of the means of social reproduction in Gaza". European Journal of Politics and Gender. 8 (2): 492–499. doi:10.1332/25151088Y2024D000000061.
- Samudzi, Zoé (18 January 2024). ""We are Fighting Nazis": Genocidal Fashionings of Gaza(ns) After 7 October". Journal of Genocide Research (Forum: Israel–Palestine: Atrocity Crimes and the Crisis of Holocaust and Genocide Studies): 1–9. doi:10.1080/14623528.2024.2305524.
- Samudzi, Zoé (18 September 2025). "Echolalias of Famine: Gaza after Biafra". Journal of Genocide Research (Roundtable: Gaza and Genocide Studies): 1–17. doi:10.1080/14623528.2025.2556569. ISSN 1462-3528.
- Segal, Raz (9 December 2023). "Statement of Scholars in Holocaust and Genocide Studies on Mass Violence in Israel and Palestine since 7 October". Contending Modernities. Archived from the original on 3 March 2024.
- Segal, Raz (2 April 2024). "Settler Antisemitism, Israeli Mass Violence, and the Crisis of Holocaust and Genocide Studies". Journal of Palestine Studies. 53 (2): 50–73. doi:10.1080/0377919X.2024.2384385.
- ——— (2025). "Israeli Settler Colonial Genocide". The Journal of Imperial and Commonwealth History. 53: 182–191. doi:10.1080/03086534.2025.2467876.
- Segal, Raz; Daniele, Luigi (5 March 2024). "Gaza as Twilight of Israel Exceptionalism: Holocaust and Genocide Studies from Unprecedented Crisis to Unprecedented Change". Journal of Genocide Research (Forum: Israel–Palestine: Atrocity Crimes and the Crisis of Holocaust and Genocide Studies): 1–10. doi:10.1080/14623528.2024.2325804.
- Semerdjian, Elyse (24 January 2024). "A World Without Civilians". Journal of Genocide Research (Forum: Israel–Palestine: Atrocity Crimes and the Crisis of Holocaust and Genocide Studies): 1–6. doi:10.1080/14623528.2024.2306714.
- Shaw, Martin (3 January 2024). "Inescapably Genocidal". Journal of Genocide Research (Forum: Israel–Palestine: Atrocity Crimes and the Crisis of Holocaust and Genocide Studies): 1–5. doi:10.1080/14623528.2023.2300555. S2CID 266778978.
- ——— (19 September 2025). "The Genocide that Changed the World". Journal of Genocide Research (Roundtable: Gaza and Genocide Studies): 1–15. doi:10.1080/14623528.2025.2556575. hdl:10230/71505.
- Sorek, Tamir (6 February 2025). "Mainstreaming a Genocidal Imagination in Israeli Society: Settler-Colonialism, Settler Anxiety, and Biblical Cues". Journal of Genocide Research (Forum: Israel-Palestine: Atrocity Crimes and the Crisis of Holocaust and Genocide Studies): 1–24. doi:10.1080/14623528.2025.2456321.
- Speri, Alice (20 December 2024). "Defining genocide: how a rift over Gaza sparked a crisis among scholars". The Guardian. Archived from the original on 21 December 2024.
- Sultany, Nimer (9 May 2024). "A Threshold Crossed: On Genocidal Intent and the Duty to Prevent Genocide in Palestine". Journal of Genocide Research (Forum: Gaza: International Humanitarian Law and Genocide): 1–26. doi:10.1080/14623528.2024.2351261.
- Swart, Mia (5 August 2025). "South Africa v Israel: South Africa's case at the International Court of Justice". The Round Table: The Commonwealth Journal of International Affairs and Policy Studies. 114 (5): 687–689. doi:10.1080/00358533.2025.2542794.
- Tharoor, Ishaan (30 July 2025). "Leading genocide scholars see a genocide happening in Gaza". The Washington Post. Archived from the original on 3 August 2025.
- Tlozek, Eric (1 September 2025). "Leading scholars say Israel committing genocide in Gaza". ABC News. Archived from the original on 6 October 2025.
- Traverso, Enzo (2024). Gaza Faces History. Other Press. ISBN 978-1-63542-555-0.
- Üngör, Uğur Ümit (26 January 2024). "Screaming, Silence, and Mass Violence in Israel/Palestine". Journal of Genocide Research (Forum: Israel–Palestine: Atrocity Crimes and the Crisis of Holocaust and Genocide Studies): 1–9. doi:10.1080/14623528.2024.2309709. hdl:20.500.11755/180f1365-bc31-44c0-95d9-02528077c91e.
- "'It Is Important to Call a Genocide a Genocide,' Consider Suspending Israel's Credential as UN Member State, Experts Tell Palestinian Rights Committee". UN News. United Nations. 31 October 2024. Archived from the original on 5 November 2024.
- "Rights expert finds 'reasonable grounds' genocide is being committed in Gaza". UN News. United Nations. 26 March 2024. Archived from the original on 28 March 2025.
- Verdeja, Ernesto (20 January 2025). "The Gaza Genocide in Five Crises". Journal of Genocide Research (Forum: Israel-Palestine: Atrocity Crimes and the Crisis of Holocaust and Genocide Studies): 1–23. doi:10.1080/14623528.2025.2452707.
- De Vogli, Roberto; Montomoli, Jonathan; Abu-Sittah, Ghassan; Pappé, Ilan (2025). "Break the selective silence on the genocide in Gaza". The Lancet. 406 (10504). Supplementary appendix pp. 3–4. doi:10.1016/S0140-6736(25)01541-7. PMID 40752501.
- Al-Waheidi, Majd (25 September 2025). "A question of intent: Is what's happening in Gaza genocide?". NPR. Archived from the original on 11 October 2025.
