= Allegations of genocide in the October 7 attacks =

Characterization of Hamas atrocities

- Part of the October 7 attacks of the Gaza war
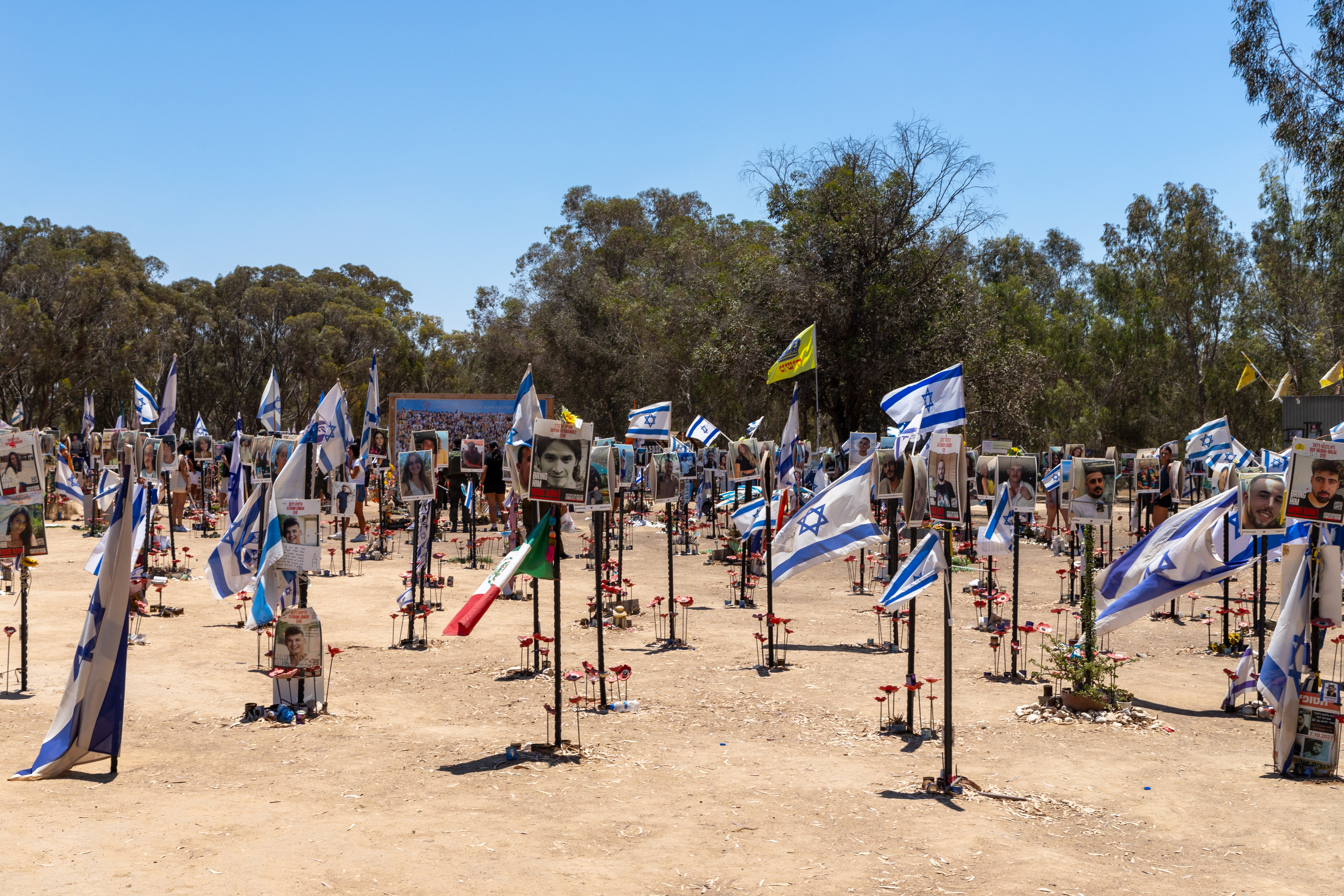
- Nova Festival Victims Memorial in Re'im
- Location: Gaza envelope, Southern District, Israel
- Date: October 7–8, 2023
- Target: Israelis
- Attack type: Massacre, mass murder, mass shooting, immolation, dismemberment, decapitation, sexual violence
- Deaths: 1,163 murdered
- Defender: Israel
- Accused: Hamas; Palestinian Islamic Jihad; Popular Resistance Committees; Popular Front for the Liberation of Palestine; Democratic Front for the Liberation of Palestine; Al-Aqsa Martyrs' Brigades; Palestinian Freedom Movement; Palestinian Mujahideen Movement

Allegations have been made that the October 7 attacks were conducted with genocidal intent toward Israelis, and that it constituted a genocide or a genocidal massacre (or a wave of such massacres). In the course of the assault, Palestinian militants attacked communities, a music festival, and military bases in the region of southern Israel known as the Gaza envelope. The attack resulted in the deaths of 1,163 Israelis and foreigners, two thirds of whom were civilians. The genocidal acts that were said to have been committed include mass killings, dismemberment, infliction of serious bodily and mental harm, immolation, rape and sexual violence, infanticide, and decapitation.

Various legal experts and genocide studies scholars cite a multitude of reasonings for their allegation of genocide, including claims that victims were targeted for their Israeli-Jewish identity, that Hamas still adheres to the antisemitic language of its founding charter, or that the alleged intent to destroy the Israeli people "in part" fits the legal definition of genocide. Comparisons of the attack to the Holocaust have been made. Criticisms against the allegation include citing the taking of hostages as proof that there was no genocidal intent, or that the attack was likely intended as a terrorist attack.

A legal complaint that Hamas committed genocide was brought to the International Criminal Court (ICC) in November 2023. An ICC arrest warrant was issued for Hamas leader Mohammed Deif, charging the group with committing the crime against humanity of extermination.

== Background ==
Both Israel and Palestine frequently accuse the other of planning to commit genocide.

=== October 7 attacks ===
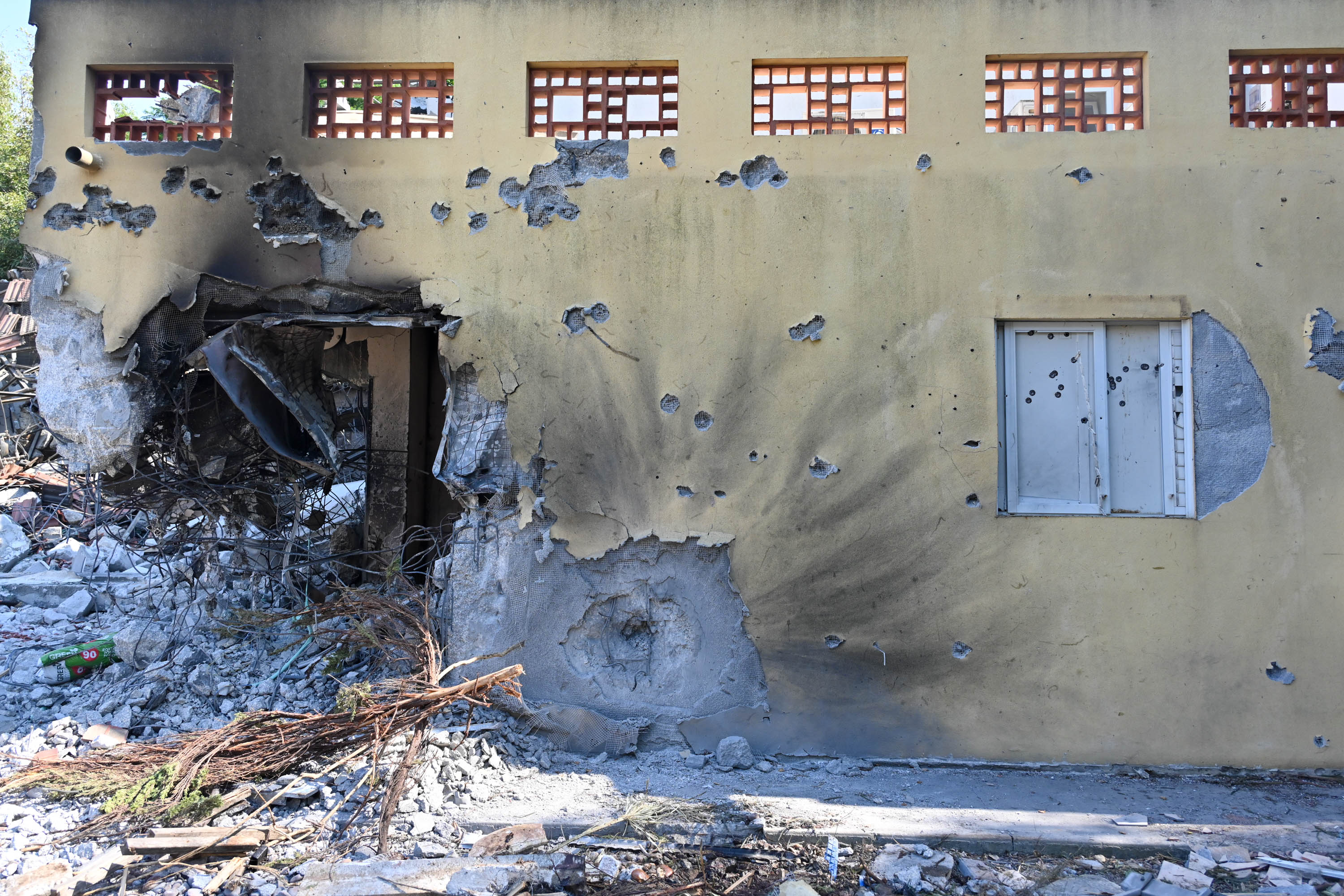
One of the houses in Be'eri in the massacre's aftermath

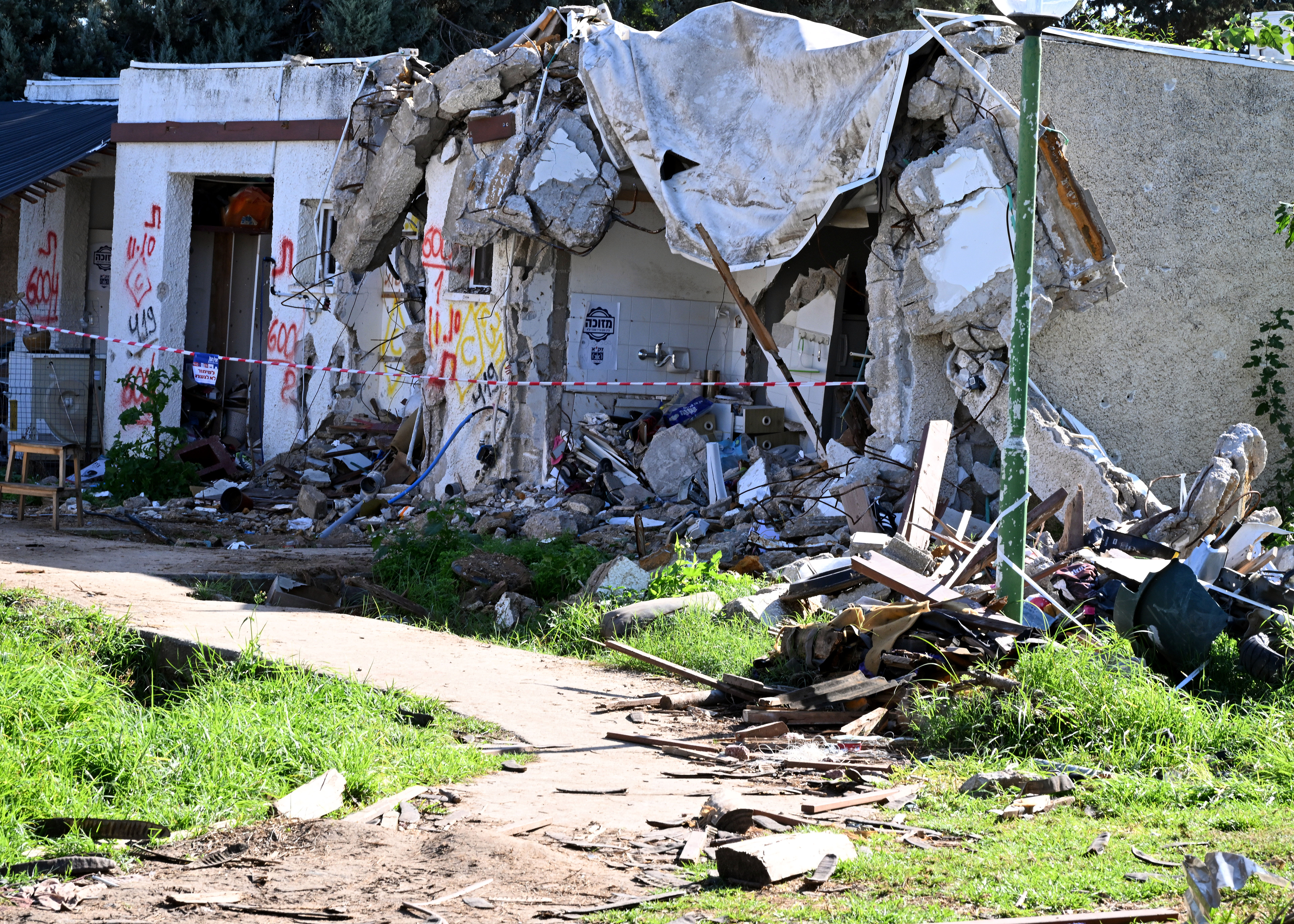
Destroyed housing in Kfar Aza, that was attacked on October 7, 2023

On October 7, 2023, coinciding with the Jewish holiday of Simchat Torah, Hamas launched a surprise attack on Israel from the Gaza Strip. Around 6,000 Palestinians breached the border in 119 places and infiltrated Israel, including 3,800 from the Hamas "elite Nukhba forces" and 2,200 Palestinian civilians and other militants. 1,163 Israelis and foreigners were killed, including 859 civilians, 282 soldiers, 57 policemen and 10 Shin Bet members.

The militants stand accused of various atrocities, including sexual violence. About 250 Israeli civilians and soldiers were also taken as hostages to the Gaza Strip, including 30 kidnapped children. The Hamas assault prompted an Israeli counter-offensive in Gaza. The day is considered the bloodiest in Israel's history and the largest massacre of Jews since the Holocaust.

Al-Qassam militants extensively recorded their actions through body cameras, probably for propaganda purposes. They also stole victims' phones to livestream their deaths on social media. Additionally, they posted messages or media on victims' social media accounts and went as far as calling relatives to taunt them.

Documents discovered on the bodies of Hamas operatives in Israel indicated that carrying out massacres was a key objective of the invasion. Israeli first responders reportedly found instructions on the bodies of the operatives, directing them to target civilian populations, including elementary schools and a youth center, with the explicit order to "kill as many people as possible". The documents also outlined the directive to take hostages for future negotiation purposes.

Ghazi Hamad, a senior Hamas official, said in a late October 2023 interview that the October 7 attack was only the beginning and that Hamas would launch "a second, a third, a fourth" attack until Israel was "annihilated." In the same interview, he said that Hamas "did not want to harm civilians," but there had been "complications on the ground," and described Hamas's actions as justified resistance, stating that "we are the victims of the occupation."

== Academic and legal discourse ==
=== Statements signed by multiple experts and specialists ===
On 16 October 2023, an open letter signed by around 240 international legal experts argued that the Hamas-led attack on 7 October "most probably" constituted an international crime of genocide, stating that the acts appeared to have been carried out with intent to destroy, in whole or in part, a protected group (Israelis). The letter was endorsed by legal experts from prominent institutions, including Harvard and Columbia Law Schools, King's College London, and the Hebrew University of Jerusalem. Dan Eldad, former acting State Attorney of Israel from February to May 2020, played a key role in drafting the letter. The Raoul Wallenberg Centre for Human Rights, chaired by former Canadian Justice Minister Irwin Cotler, also signed the letter.

In response to an International Association of Genocide Scholars resolution condemning Israel's actions in Gaza as genocide, the Academic Engagement Network, which seeks to counter "denigration of Jewish and Zionist identities", published an open letter authored by Elliot Malin, founder and president of Alpine Strategies, urging the IAGS to retract the declaration. Titled "Scholars for Truth About Genocide", the letter was signed by several hundred people, including attorneys Eli M. Rosenbaum and Alan Dershowitz, and several Holocaust educators and survivors' children, and was promoted by pro-Israel figures such as UK Lawyers for Israel and Israel's Ministry of Foreign Affairs. It argued that the IAGS resolution contained significant errors, such as overlooking the role of Hamas, which the letter argued was the only party in the Gaza war that had committed genocide. The letter was subsequently found to feature some signatories whose names had been added without their consent, faked individuals, and the names of people who were not academics. The fact-checking website Misbar said that it could not find any previous activity by Scholars for Truth About Genocide, and stated, "The statement's format and content also lack the credibility and structure expected from a scientific or academic document—contrary to the claims made by the Israeli Ministry of Foreign Affairs. The investigation found the statement relies on selective citations, omission, and misleading framing, falling short of the academic standards required to engage with the IAGS report."

=== General academic discourse ===
Genocide Watch has accused both Hamas and Israel of committing acts of genocide in the Gaza war. On 17 October 2023, it published a "Genocide Emergency Alert" stating that "Hamas targeted Israelis simply because they were Israelis" and describing the attacks as "crimes against humanity, and war crimes." On 24 October 2023, Genocide Watch issued a follow-up statement noting that scholars of Holocaust and genocide studies, including Gregory H. Stanton and Israel Charny asserted that Hamas' actions against Israeli civilians to qualify as genocide and crimes against humanity.

The Jerusalem Institute of Justice argued in March 2024 that the Palestinian Authority was complicit in the genocide due to its "Pay for slay" policy, as well as their endorsement of the attack.

In an opinion article for The Hill, Israeli human rights lawyer Arsen Ostrovsky and Stanislav Pavlovschi, a former judge at the European Court of Human Rights, asserted that Ghazi Hamad's statement that Hamas would repeat the October 7 massacre "again and again" was evidence of the group's genocidal intentions.

Sociologist Martin Shaw viewed Hamas' attack as "a wave of 'genocidal massacres,' localized mass killings whose victims were defined by their Israeli-Jewish identity", adding that the concept of the genocidal massacre, first proposed by Leo Kuper, was "a logical extension of the notion in the convention that genocide can include destroying a group 'in part.'" Stephen D. Smith, a specialist in genocide, also characterized the massacres on October 7 as a genocide. Adam Jones, author of a textbook on genocide, said Hamas' "wild and indiscriminate killing" qualified as a "genocidal massacre" that should be "acknowledged and condemned as such", but the very restrictive intentionality requirement in the legal definition of genocide was still a "high evidentiary bar to reach". Israeli historian and holocaust specialist Raz Segal similarly said: "I definitely see intent to kill a significant number of members of the group, to instill unbelievable trauma and terror among members of the group. But I don't see intent to destroy in relation to the Hamas attack that would render it an act of genocide."

Historian and professor of genocide studies Uğur Ümit Üngör noted that "many commentators rightly pointed out that Hamas committed a genocidal massacre", while also highlighting the killing of Arab Israelis and Bedouins during Hamas' attack as evidence that it may not have been "group selective". He suggested that the attack might fall under the category of "subaltern genocide", (Note: "Subaltern genocide" refers to instances of oppressed groups using genocidal means to destroy their oppressors.) drawing comparisons to the mass killing of pied-noirs in Algeria. Political scientist Abdelwahab El-Affendi refuted the "subaltern genocide" thesis, pointing to a "near-consensus" in the field of genocide studies that "genocides are almost invariably perpetrated by states", which does not apply to the Gazan enclave. He stated that the attacks were consistent with terrorism and mass violence, but that the taking of hostages for prisoner exchanges indicated that the intent of the attacks was not genocidal. According to international law expert Raphael van Steenberghe, a lack of evidence that Hamas intended to destroy a substantial part of the Jewish population is "arguably the only obstacle to qualifying the October 7 attacks as involving a crime of genocide", as Hamas "may well have anticipated that their operations could not extend beyond a limited geographical area".

Law researcher Avraham Russell Shalev argues that Hamas's long-standing ideological framework is relevant for assessing genocidal intent. Shalev states that the scale, brutality, and targeting patterns of the October 7 attacks reflect Hamas's aims and that the attack represents not only a genocidal act but the operationalization of a sustained genocidal worldview.

Genocide scholars have argued that although there was a clear intention to kill a significant number of members of a group, genocide is more than that - it requires an intent to destroy a group or a substantial part of it, but that was never a possibility. Scholars have also cited the taking of hostages as proof that there was no genocidal intent.

Gábor Halmai, Professor Emeritus of Constitutional and International Law at the European University Institute, stated that the internal conflict caused by the 2023 Israeli judicial reform was interrupted by "Hamas' genocidal attack on 7 October 2023". He also predicted that the "Netanyahu government's genocidal reaction to Hamas's genocide" would further endanger internal democracy.

=== Comparisons to the Holocaust ===
British historian Niall Ferguson characterized the events of October 7 as indicative of Hamas' intent to re-enact the Holocaust, and stated that Hamas should be "destroyed" to prevent this. Gideon Greif, a Holocaust historian, drew parallels between the October 7 attacks and the Holocaust in an article for Maariv. He highlighted the infliction of extreme suffering, including immolation, mutilation of corpses, alleged rape, and the kidnapping of babies; and the shared antisemitic hatred between Nazis and Hamas as evident in recorded statements of Hamas operatives proudly announcing the murder of Jews; and the extreme lack of mercy displayed by the attackers. Philip Spencer, a genocide scholar and author of numerous papers about modern antisemitism, stated that the violence on October 7 was "deliberately carried out to remind Jews of the extreme violence used by the Einsatzgruppen".

Israeli historian Havi Dreifuss wrote that "Even though Hamas is unable to replicate the scale of the Holocaust, one cannot ignore the numerous voices that rightly point to experiential elements and ideologies that exhibit similarities", also adding that "These men, women, and children weren't murdered for their actions, but rather, as in the Holocaust, for their very existence."

According to German political scientist Matthias Küntzel: "there are indeed clearly identifiable lines of continuity linking the anti-Jewish terror of the Nazis with that of Hamas." Küntzel described October 7 as the result of widespread antisemitism in the Arab world which dated back to the 1930s, claiming that Hamas viewed the Holocaust as "a brilliant achievement that should be repeated".

British academic Omar McDoom wrote in the Journal of Genocide Research that comparisons between the Holocaust and October 7 are indicative of a pro-Israel bias in sections of the Holocaust studies community. McDoom argues that the comparison is "problematic" because "the Germans were not an occupied and oppressed people. And Gaza is not a powerful, expansionary state. To the contrary." Genocide scholar Omer Bartov called the comparison "false, misleading, and ideologically driven", arguing that unlike the Holocaust, the root cause was not antisemitism but decades of Israeli oppression.

Some scholars have cautioned against narratives that frame marginalized groups as existential or genocidal threats, arguing that similar accusations have historically been used to justify repression. The New York Review of Books published an open letter from 16 scholars of antisemitism and the Holocaust which stated:

Israeli leaders and others are using the Holocaust framing to portray Israel's collective punishment of Gaza as a battle for civilization in the face of barbarism, thereby promoting racist narratives about Palestinians. This rhetoric encourages us to separate this current crisis from the context out of which it has arisen. Seventy-five years of displacement, fifty-six years of occupation, and sixteen years of the Gaza blockade have generated an ever-deteriorating spiral of violence that can only be arrested by a political solution. There is no military solution in Israel-Palestine, and deploying a Holocaust narrative in which an “evil” must be vanquished by force will only perpetuate an oppressive state of affairs that has already lasted far too long.

Writing in the Journal of Genocide Research, Abdelwahab El-Affendi argued that accusations of genocidal intent have at times been embedded in broader narratives of insecurity and conspiracy, including historical examples in which Jews were portrayed as threats to dominant groups, and suggested that such framing warrants critical scrutiny in contemporary debates.

=== Interpretations of Hamas documents ===
Analysts note that the 1988 Hamas charter contains internally contrasting elements. Some scholars emphasize passages such as Article 7, which includes language widely described as antisemitic, as central to understanding Hamas ideology. Others point to provisions such as Article 31, which states that followers of different religions could live in peace under Islamic rule, arguing that the document reflects ideological inconsistency rather than a single coherent doctrine. Studies of Hamas's later statements and documents, including their 2017 revised charter describe a shift toward political pragmatism and nationalist framing, with clearer distinctions between Judaism and Zionism emerging over time. Debate continues over whether this reflects clarification of earlier positions, ideological evolution, or strategic repositioning.

In December 2023 the International Association of Genocide Scholars published a research brief arguing that the statements of Hamas leadership and the scope and intent of the October 7 attacks aligned with Hamas' 1988 charter, and shows that the attack was genocidal in nature.

In an interview with Al Jazeera in December 2023, former ICC prosecutor Luis Moreno Ocampo said that the attack on October 7 was "...a genocide, because it's an attack seeking to destroy a group, in this case Israelis, in Palestine", something he bases on conversations he had while working in the region, while acknowledging that the 2017 Hamas charter could, after investigation, show that they have adjusted their goals. He also said that Israel's siege of Gaza "is a crime against humanity and a form of genocide", and called for investigations of both parties.

== Public discourse ==
In an opinion article for The Wall Street Journal, Qanta A. Ahmed shared her firsthand experience as a human-rights observer in Israel following the October 7 attacks, branding the assaults by Hamas as a "genocidal massacre", and argued for the attacks to be legally designated as such. The Economist has argued that Hamas fighters who conducted the attack on October 7 were carrying out actions in line with their genocidal intentions outlined in the group's founding charter.

In a December 2023 survey conducted by Harvard CAPS and the Harris Poll, 73% of American respondents viewed Hamas attacks against Jews as genocidal in nature, and 74% believed that Hamas harbored intentions of committing genocide against Jews in Israel.

American counterterrorism analyst Bruce Hoffman opined that Hamas has consistently maintained genocidal intentions, pointing to the genocidal and antisemitic language of their founding charter. Hoffman noted that although the revised Hamas charter does not contain the same explicitly violent rhetoric, it nevertheless asserted a desire for the destruction of Israel though military force.

== Government responses ==
=== United States ===
John Kirby, US National Security Council Coordinator for Strategic Communications, accused Hamas of "genocidal intentions against the people of Israel. They would like to see it wiped off the map, they said so on purpose. And they've said that they're not going to stop. What happened on the 7th of October is going to happen again and again and again. And what happened on the 7th of October? Murder; slaughter of innocent people in their homes or at a music festival. That's genocidal intentions." President Donald Trump stated that Hamas's acts on 7 October were 'genocide at the highest level'.

=== Israel ===
At the UN's European headquarters, Yeela Cytrin, a legal advisor at the Mission of Israel to the UN in Geneva, emphasized: "The attacks by Hamas on October 7 were motivated by a genocidal ideology."

== Legal proceedings ==
=== International Criminal Court ===
In November 2023, French diplomat and lawyer François Zimeray, representing the families of nine Israeli victims of the October 7 attacks, filed a complaint at the ICC accusing Hamas of genocide. In February 2024, a separate complaint was filed with the ICC by a delegation of family members of Israeli hostages being held in Gaza, accusing Hamas of committing war crimes.

On 20 May 2024, ICC Prosecutor Karim Khan announced that his office had filed applications for arrest warrants for Hamas leaders Yahya Sinwar, Mohammed Deif, and Ismail Haniyeh, as well as Israeli leaders Benjamin Netanyahu and Yoav Gallant, alleging responsibility for war crimes and crimes against humanity. All five were charged with the crime of extermination, but not genocide.

On 21 November 2024, the ICC issued an arrest warrant for Deif. The ICC found reasonable grounds to believe that hostage-taking during the 7 October operation was conducted with the aim of negotiating the release of Palestinian prisoners held in Israel, and that war crimes and crimes against humanity were committed during the attacks, including murder, extermination, cruel treatment of civilians, and sexual violence including rape and sexual assault. On 26 February 2025, the ICC terminated proceedings against Deif and rendered his arrest warrant without effect following the Prosecution's notification of his death.

=== Israeli tribunal ===
In May 2026, the Knesset passed a law establishing a military tribunal to prosecute Palestinian defendants for crimes committed during the October 7 attacks, including genocide.

== See also ==
- Gaza genocide
- Palestinian genocide accusation
- Sexual and gender-based violence against Israelis
- Sexual and gender-based violence against Palestinians
- War and genocide
