= Genocide definitions =

Scholarly and legal definitions of genocide

Genocide definitions include both scholarly and legal definitions of genocide. Coined by Raphael Lemkin in 1944, the word is a compound of the ancient Greek word γένος (génos, 'genus', or 'kind') and the Latin word caedō ("kill"). While there are various definitions of the term, almost all international bodies of law officially adjudicate the crime of genocide pursuant to the 1948 Convention on the Prevention and Punishment of the Crime of Genocide (CPPCG), also called the Genocide Convention. The international legal definition is narrower than various sociological and cultural definitions of genocide, narrower than the public perception of what this word means, and also narrower than the legal definition of crimes against humanity. From a legal perspective, crimes against humanity are distinct from genocide, but can sometimes be just as heinous, according to the International Commission of Inquiry on Darfur.

The Genocide Convention and nearly all genocide scholars include an intent to destroy as a requirement for any act to be labelled genocide. While many scholars also acknowledge cultural genocide as a form of genocide, there is general agreement that cultural destruction must also be accompanied by physical destruction to be called genocide. The Convention was a legal instrument resulting from a diplomatic compromise; the wording of the treaty was not intended to be a definition suitable as a research tool, and although it is used for this purpose, as it has an international legal credibility that others lack, other definitions have also been postulated. Rouben Paul Adalian writing in 2002 highlights the difficulty of trying to develop a common definition for genocide among specialists.

== Legal definition of genocide ==
The 1948 Genocide Convention defines genocide as any of five "acts committed with intent to destroy, in whole or in part, a national, ethnical, racial or religious group". The acts in question include killing members of the group, causing them serious bodily or mental harm, imposing living conditions intended to destroy the group, preventing births, and forcibly transferring children out of the group. Genocide is a crime of special intent (dolus specialis); it is carried out deliberately, with victims targeted based on real or perceived membership in a protected group.

The Genocide Convention's words "in whole or in part" were interpreted by the International Court of Justice in 2007 as follows:

[S]ince the object and purpose of the Convention as a whole is to prevent the intentional destruction of groups, the part targeted must be significant enough to have an impact on the group as a whole.

United States law also addresses this point. The 1987 statute implementing the Genocide Convention says that the words "in part" mean "in substantial part" and furthermore:

[T]he term "substantial part" means a part of a group of such numerical significance that the destruction or loss of that part would cause the destruction of the group as a viable entity within the nation of which such group is a part.

The genocides recognized under the 1948 legal definition that led to trials in international criminal tribunals are the Cambodian genocide, the Rwandan genocide, and the Srebrenica massacre. But, until 2026, the International Court of Justice had never held a state liable for genocide. There has been scholarly advocacy for expanding or reinforcing the concept of genocide, while others adhere to the original meaning under the Genocide Convention.

=== Themes in definitions of genocide ===
Raphael Lemkin's original definition of genocide was broader than that later adopted by the United Nations; he focused on genocide as the 'destruction of essential foundations of the life of national groups', including actions that led to the 'disintegration of the political and social institutions, of culture, language, national feelings, religion, and the economic existence of national groups'. Scholarly definitions vary, but there are three common themes: 'the violence or other action taken should be deliberate, organized, sustained, and large-scale', atrocities are selective for a distinguishable group, and 'the perpetrator takes steps to prevent the group from surviving or reproducing in a given territory'. The colloquial understanding of genocide is heavily influenced by the Holocaust as its archetype and is conceived as innocent victims targeted for their ethnic identity rather than for any political reason.

Genocide is often considered the apex of criminality, worse than other atrocities even if they lead to an equal amount of civilian death and destruction. However, it has also been argued that several categories of the eleven crimes against humanity can be just as heinous. In international law, genocide is distinct from crimes against humanity, and the legal definition of genocide is narrower. Genocide also has a narrower legal definition than many scholarly non-legal definitions, and the public understanding of genocide is likewise broader than the legal definition.

The tension between law and history serves to clarify the variations in the interpretation of genocide legal definitions and popular discussion. Law focuses on serious acts, defining genocide with specific criteria and limited group protections, while historians explore the complexity of genocides without legal restrictions. They consider long-term processes, various motives, and the evolution of group identities after attacks.

According to Ernesto Verdeja, associate professor of political science and peace studies at the University of Notre Dame, there are three ways to conceptualise genocide other than the legal definition: in academic social science, in international politics and policy, and in colloquial public usage. According to Verdeja, most scholars do not require proof of intent beyond a reasonable doubt. Social scientists often define genocide more broadly than the Convention. The international politics and policy definition is centred around prevention policy and intervention, and it may actually mean "large-scale violence against civilians" when used by governments and international organisations. Lastly, Verdeja says the way the general public colloquially uses "genocide" is usually "as a stand-in term for the greatest evils". This is supported by political scientist Kurt Mundorff who highlights how to the general public genocide is "simply mass murder carried out on a grand scale," akin to the crime of extermination which is a crime against humanity in international law, distinct from the crime of genocide.

== List of definitions ==
Whether something is recognized as genocide depends on which definition is used.

Date	Author	Definition
1944	Raphael Lemkin, Polish-Jewish lawyer	New conceptions require new terms. By 'genocide' we mean the destruction of a nation or of an ethnic group. This new word, coined by the author to denote an old practice in its modern development, is made from the ancient Greek word genos (race, tribe) and the Latin cide (killing), thus corresponding in its formation to such words as tyrannicide, homicide, infanticide, etc. Generally speaking, genocide does not necessarily mean the immediate destruction of a nation, except when accomplished by mass killings of all members of a nation. It is intended rather to signify a coordinated plan of different actions aiming at the destruction of essential foundations of the life of national groups, with the aim of annihilating the groups themselves. The objectives of such a plan would be the disintegration of the political and social institutions, of culture, language, national feelings, religion, and the economic existence of national groups, and the destruction of the personal security, liberty, health, dignity, and even the lives of the individuals belonging to such groups. Genocide is directed against the national group as an entity, and the actions involved are directed against individuals, not in their individual capacity, but as members of the national group. (Axis Rule in Occupied Europe ix. 79)
1945	Count 3 of the indictment of the 24 Nazi leaders at the Nuremberg Trials	They (the defendants) conducted deliberate and systematic genocide—viz., the extermination of racial and national groups—against the civilian populations of certain occupied territories in order to destroy particular races and classes of people, and national, racial or religious groups, particularly Jews, Poles, Gypsies and others.
1945	Raphael Lemkin	It is for this reason that I took the liberty of inventing the word, genocide. The term is from the Greek word genes meaning tribe or race and the Latin cide meaning killing. Genocide tragically enough must take its place in the dictionary of the future beside other tragic words like homicide and infanticide. As Von Rundstedt has suggested the term does not necessarily signify mass killings although it may mean that. More often it [Genocide] refers to a coordinated plan aimed at destruction of the essential foundations of the life of national groups so that these groups wither and die like plants that have suffered a blight. The end may be accomplished by the forced disintegration of political and social institutions, of the culture of the people, of their language, their national feelings and their religion. It may be accomplished by wiping out all basis of personal security, liberty, health and dignity. When these means fail the machine gun can always be utilized as a last resort. Genocide is directed against a national group as an entity and the attack on individuals is only secondary to the annihilation of the national group to which they belong.
1946	Raphael Lemkin	The crime of genocide should be recognized therein as a conspiracy to exterminate national, religious or racial groups. The overt acts of such a conspiracy may consist of attacks against life, liberty or property of members of such groups merely because of their affiliation with such groups. The formulation of the crime may be as follows: "Whoever, while participating in a conspiracy to destroy a national, racial or religious group, undertakes an attack against life, liberty or property of members of such groups is guilty of the crime of genocide. ("Genocide", American Scholar, Volume 15, no. 2 (April 1946), p. 227–230)
1946	United Nations General Assembly Resolution 96 (I) (11 December)	Genocide is a denial of the right of existence of entire human groups, as homicide is the denial of the right to live of individual human beings; such denial of the right of existence shocks the conscience of mankind, ...and is contrary to moral law and to the spirit and aims of the United Nations. ... The General Assembly, therefore, affirms that genocide is a crime under international law...whether the crime is committed on religious, racial, political or any other grounds...
1948	The Convention on the Prevention and Punishment of the Crime of Genocide (CPPCG) was adopted by the UN General Assembly on 9 December 1948 and came into effect on 12 January 1951 (Resolution 260 (III)). Article 2:	Any of the following acts committed with intent to destroy, in whole or in part, a national, ethnical, racial or religious group, as such: killing members of the group; causing serious bodily or mental harm to members of the group; deliberately inflicting on the group conditions of life, calculated to bring about its physical destruction in whole or in part; imposing measures intended to prevent births within the group; [or] forcibly transferring children of the group to another group. (Article 2 CPPCG)
1959	Pieter N. Drost, Dutch law professor	Genocide is the deliberate destruction of physical life of individual human beings by reason of their membership of any human collectivity as such. (The Crime of State, Volume 2, Leiden, 1959, p. 125.)
1960	Nehemiah Robinson, lawyer and director of the Institute of Jewish Affairs of the World Jewish Congress	Genocide has been committed when acts of homicide are joined with a connecting purpose, i.e., directed against persons with specific characteristics (with intent to destroy the group or a segment thereof).
1975	Vahakn Dadrian, Armenian sociologist	Genocide is the successful attempt by a dominant group, vested with formal authority and/or with preponderant access to the overall resources of power, to reduce by coercion or lethal violence the number of a minority group whose ultimate extermination is held desirable and useful and whose respective vulnerability is a major factor contributing to the decision for genocide. (A Typology of Genocide)
1976	Irving Louis Horowitz, sociologist	[Genocide is] a structural and systematic destruction of innocent people by a state bureaucratic apparatus. ...Genocide represents a systematic effort over time to liquidate a national population, usually a minority...[and] functions as a fundamental political policy to assure conformity and participation of the citizenry. (Genocide: State Power and Mass Murder)
1981	Leo Kuper, genocide scholar	I shall follow the definition of genocide given in the [UN] Convention. This is not to say that I agree with the definition. On the contrary, I believe a major omission to be in the exclusion of political groups from the list of groups protected. In the contemporary world, political differences are at the very least as significant a basis for massacre and annihilation as racial, national, ethnic or religious differences. Then too, the genocides against racial, national, ethnic or religious groups are generally a consequence of, or intimately related to, political conflict. However, I do not think it helpful to create new definitions of genocide, when there is an internationally recognized definition and a Genocide Convention which might become the basis for some effective action, however limited the underlying conception. But since it would vitiate the analysis to exclude political groups, I shall refer freely...to liquidating or exterminatory actions against them. (Genocide: Its Political Use in the Twentieth Century)
1982	Jack Nusan Porter, Ukrainian American sociologist	Genocide is the deliberate destruction, in whole or in part, by a government or its agents, of a racial, sexual, religious, tribal or political minority. It can involve not only mass murder, but also starvation, forced deportation, and political, economic and biological subjugation. Genocide involves three major components: ideology, technology, and bureaucracy/organization.
1984	Yehuda Bauer, Israeli historian and Holocaust scholar	[Genocide is] the planned destruction, since the mid-nineteenth century, of a racial, national, or ethnic group as such, by the following means: (a) selective mass murder of elites or parts of the population; (b) elimination of national (racial, ethnic) culture and religious life with the intent of "denationalization"; (c) enslavement, with the same intent; (d) destruction of national (racial, ethnic) economic life, with the same intent; (e) biological decimation through the kidnapping of children, or the prevention of normal family life, with the same intent.... [Holocaust is] the planned physical annihilation, for ideological or pseudo-religious reasons, of all the members of a national, ethnic, or racial group.
1987	Tony Barta, historian	My conception of a genocidal society—as distinct from a genocidal state—is one in which the bureaucratic apparatus might officially be directed to protect innocent people but in which a whole race is nevertheless subject to remorseless pressures of destruction inherent in the very nature of the society. ("Relations of Genocide: Land and Lives in the Colonization of Australia", pp. 239–240.) (see also Australian genocide debate)
1987	Isidor Wallimann and Michael N. Dobkowski	Genocide is the deliberate, organized destruction, in whole or in large part, of racial or ethnic groups by a government or its agents. It can involve not only mass murder, but also forced deportation (ethnic cleansing), systematic rape, and economic and biological subjugation. (Genocide and the Modern Age: Etiology and Case Studies of Mass Death. Syracuse, NY: Syracuse University Press, 2000. Reissue of an early work.)
1988	Helen Fein, sociologist	Genocide is any act that puts the very existence of a group in jeopardy. (Genocide: A Sociological Perspective, London)
1988	Henry Huttenbach	Genocide is a series of purposeful actions by a perpetrator(s) to destroy a collectivity through mass or selective murders of group members and suppressing the biological and social reproduction of the collectivity. This can be accomplished through the imposed proscription or restriction of reproduction of group members, increasing infant mortality, and breaking the linkage between reproduction and socialization of children in the family or group of origin. The perpetrator may represent the state of the victim, another state, or another collectivity. ("Locating the Holocaust on the Genocide Spectrum: Towards a Methodology of Definition and Categorization", Holocaust and Genocide Studies. Vol. 3, No. 3, pp. 289–303.)
1988	Barbara Harff and Ted Gurr, professors of political science	the promotion and execution of policies by a state or its agents which result in the deaths of a substantial portion of a group ...[when] the victimized groups are defined primarily in terms of their communal characteristics, i.e., ethnicity, religion or nationality. ("Toward Empirical Theory of Genocides and Politicides", International Studies Quarterly, 37:3, 1988)
1990	Frank Chalk and Kurt Jonassohn	Genocide is a form of one-sided mass killing in which a state or other authority intends to destroy a group, as that group and membership in it are defined by the perpetrator. (The History and Sociology of Genocide: Analyses and Case Studies, Yale University Press)
1990	John L. P. Thompson and Gail A. Quets	In short, given the problems which arise from restrictions, we define genocide as the destruction of a group by purposive action. This allows the role of intentional action to be explored, different subtypes of genocide to be compared, and the impact of different factors on genocide to be examined empirically. (Genocide and Social Conflict: A Partial Theory and Comparison, p. 248)
1993	Helen Fein	Genocide is sustained purposeful action by a perpetrator to physically destroy a collectivity directly or indirectly, through interdiction of the biological and social reproduction of group members, sustained regardless of the surrender or lack of threat offered by the victim. (Genocide: A Sociological Perspective, 1993/1990)
1993	Christopher Bollas, American-born British psychoanalyst	Genocide composes of the mental processes of intellectual genocide, precursor to, and eventually part of, the genocidal act. The visible traits can be identified in committive genocide, which distorts, decontextualizes, and denigrates the victimized and then caricatures the victimized so as to assassinate the character with a change of name and categorized as an aggregation. It then leads to omittive genocide with an absence of reference. (The Fascist State of Mind in Being a Character: Psychoanalysis and Self Experience, 1993)
1994	Steven T. Katz, American philosopher and scholar	[Genocide is] the actualization of the intent, however successfully carried out, to murder in its totality any national, ethnic, racial, religious, political, social, gender or economic group, as these groups are defined by the perpetrator, by whatever means. (The Holocaust in Historical Context, Vol. 1, 1994) [Modified by Adam Jones in 2000 to read, "murder in whole or in substantial part…, in 2010 to read, "murder in whole or in part… "]
1994	Israel W. Charny, psychologist and genocide-scholar	Genocide in the generic sense means the mass killing of substantial numbers of human beings, when not in the course of military action against the military forces of an avowed enemy, under conditions of the essential defenselessness of the victim. (Genocide: Conceptual and Historical Dimensions ed. George Andreopoulos)
1996	Irving Louis Horowitz, sociologist	Genocide is herein defined as a structural and systematic destruction of innocent people by a state bureaucratic apparatus.... Genocide mean the physical dismemberment and liquidation of people on large scales, an attempt by those who rule to achieve the total elimination of a subject people.
2002	Rome Statute of the International Criminal Court	Article 6 of the Rome Statute provides that "genocide" means any of the following acts committed with intent to destroy, in whole or in part, a national, ethnical, racial or religious group, as such (a) Killing members of the group; (b) Causing serious bodily or mental harm to members of the group; (c) Deliberately inflicting on the group conditions of life calculated to bring about its physical destruction in whole or in part; (d) Imposing measures intended to prevent births within the group; (e) Forcibly transferring children of the group to another group.
2002	Rouben Paul Adalian, historian and director of the Armenian National Institute	[W]ithout constructing a dictionary definition, there are five elements that I find necessary to identify a specific atrocity as genocide: the commissioning party is the state, or any institution acting as the instrument of the state, proceeding in the avowed interest of the state; the objects of the policy, the victims, are civilians incapable of mounting an organized defence of their lives, families, and properties; the atrocity is on a scale such as to indicate a scheme by its architects for the wholesale extermination of a sizable segment of a population, if not an entire people, defined or self-defined as a distinct social community; that the objective is a permanent alteration of the demographic characteristics and composition of a defined geographic space; and that all of the above occur or are implemented over, historically-speaking, a short period of time.
2003	Barbara Harff, political scientist	Genocides and politicides are the promotion, execution, and/or implied consent of sustained policies by governing elites or their agents—or, in the case of civil war either of the contending authorities—that are intended to destroy, in whole or part, a communal, political, or politicized ethnic group.
2005	Manus I. Midlarsky, political scientist	Genocide is understood to be the state-sponsored systematic mass murder of innocent and helpless men, women, and children denoted by a particular ethno-religious identity, having the purpose of eradicating this group from a particular territory.
2005	Mark Levene, historian	Genocide occurs when a state, perceiving the integrity of its agenda to be threatened by an aggregate population—defined by the state as an organic collectivity, or series of collectivities—seeks to remedy the situation by the systematic, en masse physical elimination of that aggregate, in toto, or until it is no longer perceived to represent a threat.
2005	Jacques Sémelin, historian and political scientist	I will define genocide as that particular process of civilian destruction that is directed at the total eradication of a group, the criteria by which it is identified being determined by the perpetrator.
2006	Daniel Chirot and Clark McCauley	A genocidal mass murder is politically motivated violence that directly or indirectly kills a substantial proportion of a targeted population, combatants and noncombatants alike, regardless of their age or gender.
2007	Martin Shaw, sociologist	Genocide is a form of violent social conflict or war, between armed power organizations that aim to destroy civilian social groups and those groups and other actors who resist this destruction. Genocidal action is action in which armed power organizations treat civilian social groups as enemies and aim to destroy their real or putative social power, by means of killing, violence and coercion against individuals whom they regard as members of the groups.
2007	Daniel Feierstein, social scientist	Genocide should be defined in broad and general terms as the execution of a large-scale and systematic plan with the intention of destroying a human group as such in whole or in part. (English translation, 2014)
2009	Donald Bloxham, historian	[Genocide is] the physical destruction of a large portion of a group in a limited or unlimited territory with the intention of destroying that group's collective existence.
2011	Uğur Ümit Üngör, Dutch–Turkish historian, sociologist	Genocide can be defined as a complex process of systematic persecution and annihilation of a group of people by a government... We can speak of genocide when individuals are persecuted and murdered merely on the basis of their presumed or imputed membership in a group rather than on their individual characteristics or participation in certain acts.
2013	Adrian Gallagher, professor of mass-atrocity prevention	Genocide is when a collective source of power (usually a State) intentionally uses its power base to implement a process of destruction in order to destroy a group (as defined by the perpetrator), in whole or in substantial part, dependent upon relative group size.
2014	Christopher Powell and Julia Peristerakis	We define genocide as the violent erasure of a collective identity and understand genocide as a multidimensional process that works through the destruction of the social institutions that maintain collective identity as well as through the physical destruction of human individuals.
2017	John Cox, historian	Genocide is the concerted, coordinated effort to destroy any human group or collectivity as it is defined by the perpetrator. Genocide differs from other mass crimes against humanity and atrocities by its ambition. Genocide aims to not only eliminate individual members of the targeted group but to destroy the group's ability to maintain its social and cultural cohesion and, thus, its existence as a group. Because perpetrators very rarely provide explicit statements of genocidal intent, this intent can be uncovered by examining policies, actions, and outcomes, as well as the guiding ideology.
2017	Maureen S. Hiebert, political scientist	[T]he intentional, systematic physical, biological, and/or cultural destruction of the members of a group in which the group is defined by the perpetrator.
2024	Thomas Earl Porter, historian	Genocide is the purposeful attempt to destroy any human group as defined by the genocidists. It is an effort to disrupt that group's social cohesion, thereby preventing its ability to maintain its cultural identity, and thus, its very existence as a group.

== Criticisms of definitions ==
Since the adoption of the CPPCG there has been criticism of the definition adopted. Common criticisms across definitions includes the focus on physical destruction, the defining of target groups, and the proportion of a group that needs to be affected to cross the threshold to be considered "genocide".

Christian Gerlach, professor of Modern History at the University of Bern, opposes the concept of genocide. His history of the Holocaust, The Extermination of the European Jews, does not use the term, and in a 2023 interview with the World Socialist Web Site he called genocide "an analytically worthless concept made for political purposes" and "an instrument of liberal imperialism".

In literature, some scholars have popularly emphasized the role that the Soviet Union played in excluding political groups from the international definition of genocide, which is contained in the Genocide Convention of 1948, and in particular they have written that Joseph Stalin may have feared greater international scrutiny of the political killings that occurred in the country, such as the Great Purge; however, this claim is not supported by evidence. The Soviet view was shared and supported by many diverse countries, and they were also in line with Raphael Lemkin's original conception, and it was originally promoted by the World Jewish Congress. By 1951, Lemkin was saying that the Soviet Union was the only state that could be indicted for genocide; his concept of genocide, as it was outlined in Axis Rule in Occupied Europe, covered Stalinist deportations as genocide by default, and differed from the adopted Genocide Convention in many ways. From a 21st-century perspective, its coverage was very broad, and as a result, it would classify almost any gross human rights violation as a genocide, and many events that were deemed genocidal by Lemkin did not amount to genocide under the convention. As the Cold War began, this change was the result of Lemkin's turn to anti-communism in an attempt to convince the United States to ratify the Genocide Convention.

Historian Anton Weiss-Wendt has highlighted how much countries' own interest in not being prosecuted under the CPPCG led to changes to the final CPPCG adopted by the UN.

== See also ==
- Outline of genocide studies
- List of genocides
- Prevention of genocide
