= Melanie O'Brien =

Australian legal scholar

- Education: University of Newcastle, Lund University, University of Nottingham
- Employer: University of Western Australia (2022–)
- Office: President of IAGS (since 2021)

Melanie O'Brien is a legal scholar specialising in relations between sexual and gender-based violence against women, atrocities such as genocide and international human rights law and international humanitarian law. Since 2022 or earlier she has been an associate professor at the University of Western Australia. O'Brien has been the president of the International Association of Genocide Scholars from 2021–2025.

== Education ==
O'Brien obtained a Bachelor of Arts degree in history and French and a Bachelor of Laws at the University of Newcastle in Australia, and a master's degree in international human rights law at Lund University in Sweden. In 2010, she obtained her PhD in international law from the University of Nottingham in the UK, for research studying whether national or international jurisdiction for criminal accountability for sexual abuse by UN peacekeepers against women would be more effective. O'Brien's conclusion is that national level criminal procedures would be "far more likely and far more effective".

== Legal research ==
O'Brien's fields of research include the relations between sexual and gender-based violence against women, atrocities such as genocide and human rights.

O'Brien has been an amicus curiae for the International Criminal Court, which has cited her forced marriage research.

== Career ==
Since 2022 or earlier, and as of 2025, O'Brien holds an associate professor position in international law at the University of Western Australia. O'Brien was a research fellow at the Sydney Jewish Museum in 2022. In 2023, she was a visiting fellow at the University of Loughborough. During 2023–2025, she held visitor positions at the Center for Holocaust and Genocide Studies and the Law School Human Rights Center at the University of Minnesota.

O'Brien has been the president of the International Association of Genocide Scholars during the 2021–2023 and 2023–2025 electoral terms.

== Points of view ==
In June 2022, together with Noelle Quinevet, O'Brien argued that toxic masculinity has been characteristic of the Soviet Union/Russian army for 70 years, citing Joseph Stalin's description of Soviet soldiers' rapes of 50,000 to 100,000 German women in 1945 as "having fun" and arguing that the pattern of rape by Russian soldiers during the full-scale invasion of Ukraine was part of an ongoing pattern. O'Brien and Quinevet recommended that the International Criminal Court investigation in Ukraine cover these crimes in its investigations and prosecutions, emphasizing the role of gender. They argued that past impunity for sexual violence by Russians, "in conflict and peacetime, [created] a culture of acceptance for violence against women."

In June 2025, O'Brien stated that the Gaza genocide satisfied the genocide definitions of the international Genocide Convention and the Rome Statute. She stated that genocidal intent was established by "clear expressions of intent" by Israeli leaders' statements "about destroying Gaza and starving its population" as well as "patterns of conduct, including indiscriminate bombings, mass casualties, the destruction of healthcare and essential infrastructure, and the denial of humanitarian aid [including] deliberate denial of water, food, medicine, shelter, and healthcare". O'Brien stated that "even if self-defence is invoked [by Israel against the October 7 attacks], that does not justify genocide. There is no legal defence for genocide under international law."
