= Janja Beč =

Serbian writer

Janja Beč Neumann is German and former Yugoslav sociologist, genocide researcher, writer and lecturer.

== Early life and education ==
Beč Neumann was born in Zemun, former Socialist Federal Republic of Yugoslavia, today Serbia. She holds BSc in Engineering of Technology (University of Belgrade) and PhD in Sociology (University of Zagreb, University of Cambridge). She is a member of the International Association of Genocide Scholars. She holds dual German and Serbian citizenship.

In her scientific work she concerns herself in research and lecture with the topics war crimes, genocide and memories at the territories of the former Yugoslavia. She established the MA Course on War Crimes, Genocide and Memories, the first such course to be set up in South-Eastern Europe since the 1992–1995 Bosnian war. She has written numerous academic publications as well as theater-plays on these topics.

Beč Neumann has been known as a rare voice in Serbia calling for recognition that genocide was perpetrated against Bosniaks in the Bosnian war. Considered an authoritative voice on the Srebrenica genocide, she has described the explanations given by Bosnian Serb officials including Member of the Presidency of Bosnia and Herzegovina from Republika Srpska Nebojša Radmanović for their refusal to attend the collective burial and commemoration ceremonies for the victims as "shameful" and regards the Dutch battalion of the United Nations Protection Force (UNPROFOR) who expelled civilian refugees from their compound at Potočari in July 1995 as accomplices in what happened.

She describes denial as the last phase of genocide which takes generations to confront, as shown in the case of Germany.

In 2005 she was nominated for the Nobel Peace Prize.

== Published books ==
- Why Wars in Yugoslavia? (Novi Sad & Belgrade, 1993)
- The Shattering of the Soul (Belgrade, 1997)
- Sewing up the Blue (Cairo, 2002)
- Genocide live (Granada, 2003)
- Archipelago Atlantis (Sarajevo, 2004)
- Srebrenica from Denial to Confession; Banality of Indifference (2005)
- Top 10 Bystanders in Srebrenica (2005)
- Darkness at Noon: War Crimes, Genocide and Memories (Sarajevo, 2007)
- Talks with Richard Goldstone (Sarajevo, 2007)
