= Jack Nusan Porter =

American sociologist

- Born: Nusia Jakub Puchtik; December 2, 1944 (age 81); Rovno, Ukrainian SSR, Soviet Union (now Ukraine)
- Citizenship: USA
- Occupations: Writer, sociologist, genocide and Holocaust scholar
- Spouse: Miriam Almuly (1977–1997) Rona Vogel (2007) Raya Evashko Porter (m. 2011)
- Parent: Irving Porter (Israel Puchtik) 1906–1979 Faye Merin Porter (Fayge Puchtik) 1909–2009

Jack Nusan Porter (born Nusia Jakub Puchtik, December 2, 1944) is an American writer, sociologist, human rights activist, and former treasurer and vice-president of the International Association of Genocide Scholars. He is a former assistant professor of social science at Boston University and a former research associate at Harvard's Ukrainian Research Institute. Currently, he is a research associate at the Davis Center for Russian and Eurasian Studies at Harvard University, where he conducts research on Israeli-Russian relations. Some of his research topics include the life of Golda Meir, the application of mathematical and statistical models to predict genocide and terrorism, and modes of resistance to genocide.

== Early life and education ==
Nusia Jakub Puchtik was born December 2, 1944, in Rovno, Ukraine, to Jewish-Ukrainian partisan parents Fayge and Israel Puchtik. The family emigrated to the United States on June 20, 1946, and their name was Anglicized to Porter.

He grew up in Milwaukee, Wisconsin, and attended Washington High School. He moved to Israel and studied at the Machon L'Madrichei Chutz La'Aretz. Porter attended the University of Wisconsin–Milwaukee from 1963 to 1967, majoring in sociology and Hebrew Studies. In 1967, he began a PhD in sociology at Northwestern University.

Research topics included: Sociology and National Socialism: the lives of Edward Yarnall Hartshorne and Talcott Parsons of Harvard University in the 1940s, the history of Holocaust studies at Harvard University since the 1930s to the present.

== Career ==
In 1976, Porter founded the Journal of the History of Sociology; it published its first issue in 1978.

In the spring of 2012, Porter ran for United States Representative as a write-in candidate in Massachusetts' Fourth District following the departure of incumbent Representative Barney Frank. Running as a Democrat, Porter described himself as a "radical-libertarian-progressive" and aligned his views with those of Representative Ron Paul and Senator Bernie Sanders. Porter's write-in candidacy gained less than 0.1% of the vote; Joseph Kennedy III won the primary with approximately 90% of the vote and was later elected to his first term in Congress in the 2012 general election.

== Selected works ==
Porter's books include:

- Student Protest and the Technocratic Society: The Case of ROTC (Chicago: Adams Press, 1973 and based on his sociology Ph.D. dissertation from Northwestern University, June 1971)
- Jewish Radicalism (Grove Press, 1973; with Peter Dreier)
- The Sociology of American Jews (University Press of America, 1978, 1980)
- The Jew as Outsider (University Press of America, 1981; The Spencer Press, 2014)
- Jewish Partisans: A Documentary of Jewish Resistance in the Soviet Union During World War II (University Press of America, 1982; The Spencer Press, 2013)
- Conflict and Conflict Resolution: An Historical Bibliography (Garland Publishing, 1982)
- Genocide and Human Rights: A Global Anthology (University Press of America, 1982)
- Confronting History and Holocaust (University Press of America, 1983; new edition with bibliography of Porter's works, The Spencer Press, 2014)
- Sexual Politics in the Third Reich: The Persecution of the Homosexuals During the Holocaust (The Spencer Press, 1991, with Rudiger Lautmann and Erhard Vismar; 20th Anniversary edition, The Spencer Press, 2011)
- The Sociology of Genocide: A Curriculum Guide (American Sociological Association, 1992)
- The Sociology of Jewry: A Curriculum Guide (American Sociological Association, 1992)
- Women in Chains: On the Agunah (Jason Aronson, 1995)
- The Genocidal Mind: Sociological and Sexual Perspectives (University Press of America, 2006)
- Is Sociology Dead? Social Theory and Social Praxis in a Post-Modern Age (University Press of America, 2008)
- Sexual Politics in Nazi Germany: The Persecution of the Homosexuals and Lesbians During the Holocaust (The Spencer Press, 2011, 2023)
- The Radical Writings of Jack Nusan Porter (Academic Studies Press, 2020)
- Jewish Partisans of the Soviet Union During World War II (in Russian and English, Academic Studies Press, 2022)
- Can Mathematical Models Predict Genocide? (The Spencer Press, 2022)
- Can Mathematical Models Predict Terrorist Acts? (Academic Studies Press, 2022; with Trevor Jones)
- The Wit and Wisdom of Erich Goldhagen on Hitler, Nazism, the Holocaust and Other Genocides (The Spencer Press, 2023)
- If Only You Could Bottle It: Memoirs of a Radical Son (Academic Studies Press, 2023)
- L'Matara (For the Purpose): Jewish Partisan Poetry and Prose from the DP Camps of Europe (Academic Studies Press, 2023)

== Awards ==
- 2004: Lifetime Achievement Award, American Sociological Association Section on the History of Sociology for his founding of the Journal of the History of Sociology, 1977–1982. He shared the award with Glenn Jacobs and Alan Sica.
- 2009: The Robin Williams Award for Distinguished Contributions to Scholarship, Teaching, and Service from the American Sociological Association, Section on Peace, War, and Social Conflict (for his work in genocide and Holocaust studies).
