= Academic Engagement Network =

American pro-Israel advocacy group

- Formation: December 2015; 10 years ago
- Website: academicengagement.org

The Academic Engagement Network (AEN) is an American advocacy group founded in 2015. Its aim is to implement pro-Israel policies on university campuses. It says its mission is to "counter antisemitism, oppose the denigration of Jewish and Zionist identities, promote academic freedom, and advance education about Israel." According to the Washington Square News, the AEN is affiliated with the Heritage Foundation and other right-wing organizations.

== History ==
The AEN was founded in December 2015 by a group of academics to counter antisemitic and anti-Israel activity on university campuses. Its leaders were Mark Yudof, a former president of the University of California System, and Kenneth Waltzer, a former director of Jewish studies at Michigan State University, and its members included academics such as Deborah Lipstadt, Steven Pinker and Rabbi David Ellenson. At the time, the AEN was preparing a manual for university administrators to counter the Boycott, Divestment and Sanctions (BDS) movement.

In January 2019, the AEN appointed Miriam Elman, an associate professor of political science at the Maxwell School of Citizenship and Public Affairs at Syracuse University, as its executive director.

After the Gaza war protests at universities started in October 2023, New York University (NYU) named the AEN as a partner in its announcement of a Center for the Study of Antisemitism. The center was launched in May 2024. NYU's updated Non Discrimination and Anti-Harassment guidelines, which designate Zionism as a code word for "Jewish identity", were praised by Elman as a "model text for other universities nationwide."

In December 2025, the AEN, the Anti-Defamation League (ADL) and the American Jewish Committee (AJC) said in a joint statement that they were "deeply troubled" by a report issued that October by the National Communication Association's Task Force on Academic Freedom and Tenure. The report said that false charges of antisemitism and terrorism were being used to attack academic freedom in the U.S.

=== Response to the 2025 IAGS Gaza resolution ===
In September 2025, the AEN published an open letter authored by Elliot Malin urging the International Association of Genocide Scholars (IAGS) to retract its declaration that Israel is committing a genocide in Gaza. Titled "Scholars for Truth About Genocide", the letter was signed by several hundred people, including Eli M. Rosenbaum and several Holocaust educators and survivors' children, and was promoted by pro-Israel figures such as UK Lawyers for Israel and Israel's Ministry of Foreign Affairs. It argued that the IAGS resolution contained significant errors, such as overlooking the role of Hamas, and that accusing Israel of genocide devalued the legal definition of genocide.

The open letter was subsequently found to feature two signatories whose names had been added without their consent. A social media user also said they were able to sign up with false information, revealing overly lax standards for inclusion. In response to allegations of wrongdoing, AEN executive director Miriam Elman said the letter had been subjected to "sabotage attempts." The fact-checking website Misbar reported that there was no evidence of activity by Scholars for Truth About Genocide prior to the letter's publication; that the signatories to the letter included "some academics and experts in history, law, and the Holocaust" but "their numbers are very small compared to the total 514 signatories" which included political advocacy groups, individuals without relevant expertise like graphic designers, or odd entries like "CEO, Tel Aviv University"; and that the letter relied "on selective citations, omission, and misleading framing, falling short of the academic standards required to engage with the IAGS report."

== Affiliations ==
According to the Washington Square News, the AEN is part of the Israel on Campus Coalition (ICC), a pro-Israel umbrella organization established in 2002, and has worked directly with the Heritage Foundation and its Project Esther.

== See also ==
- Israel lobby in the United States
