= Helen Fein =

American sociologist (1934–2022)

Helen Fein (September 17, 1934 – May 14, 2022) was a historical sociologist and professor who specialized in genocide, human rights, collective violence and other issues. She was an author and editor of four books and monographs, an associate of the International Security Program (Harvard University), and a founder and first president of the International Association of Genocide Scholars. Fein was the executive director of the Institute for the Study of Genocide (City University of New York). She died on May 14, 2022, at the age of 87.

== Definition of antisemitism ==
In The persisting question: sociological perspectives and social contexts of modern antisemitism, Fein wrote:

I propose to define antisemitism as a persisting latent structure of hostile beliefs towards Jews as a collectivity manifested in individuals as attitudes, and in culture as myth, ideology, folklore, and imagery, and in actions — social or legal discrimination, political mobilization against the Jews, and collective or state violence — which results in and/or is designed to distance, displace, or destroy Jews as Jews.

== Publications ==
- Genocide Watch, 1992.
- Genocide: A Sociological Perspective, 1993
- Accounting for Genocide, 1979
- Human Rights and Wrongs, 2007
