= Craig Mokhiber =

Former UN employee and human rights official

Craig Gerard Mokhiber (born in 1960) is an American former United Nations (UN) human rights official and a specialist in international human rights law, policy, and methodology. On October 28, 2023, Mokhiber stepped down as the director of the New York office of the United Nations High Commissioner for Human Rights (OHCHR), four days before he was due to retire. In his final letter to High Commissioner Volker Türk, he harshly criticized the organization's response to the war in Gaza, calling Israel's military intervention a "textbook genocide" and accusing the UN of failing to act.

== Early life ==
Craig Gerard Mokhiber is the youngest of six sons of Lorraine Pealer of Niagara Falls, New York, and Mitchell Fadel Mokhiber of Getzville, New York. Mitchell Mokhiber (1932–2021), who was a member of the Antiochian Orthodox community, was the son of Edward Mokhiber who immigrated to the US from what is now Lebanon in 1908.

Mokhiber studied at Niagara Falls High School and graduated from the University at Buffalo Law School. He specialized in investigating human rights abuses. For several years he served as an attorney with the United Nations human rights office in Geneva, Switzerland.

== Career ==
Mokhiber served the United Nations from 1992 to October 2023. Initially he led the Human Rights and Development Team, which was tasked with the development of the Office of the High Commissioner for Human Rights (OHCHR)'s human rights-based approach (HRBA), "a conceptual framework for the process of human development that is normatively based on international human rights standards and operationally directed to promoting and protecting human rights". Mokhiber also served as a UN specialist in Palestine, Afghanistan, and Darfur. He lived in Gaza during the 1990s while working as an advisor for the UN.

In 2009, he spoke at a special themed discussion event on the topics of UN interest addressed by the 2004 television series Battlestar Galactica at United Nations Headquarters in New York City, organized by the Creative Community Outreach Initiative of the UN Department of Public Information.

Most recently, Mokhiber was the director of the New York office of the UN's High Commissioner for Human Rights. In March 2023, he wrote to High Commissioner Volker Türk to express his concerns about human rights violations on the West Bank and to inform him that he would be resigning his post later that year. In March 2023, pro-Israel NGO UN Watch criticized Mokhiber for what it considered a lack of neutrality and an anti-Israel bias in his social media posts. Ynet wrote that Mokhiber's critics contend that, "despite being a part of an agency that claims to be apolitical", he has "a long history of publishing virulently anti-Israel statements". Mokhiber responded that "if you defend the human rights of Palestinians you will be smeared as an antisemite. After 40+ years in the human rights movement, I’m used to this dance".

=== Departure from the UN ===
On October 28, 2023, days before his retirement became effective, he again wrote to the high commissioner, accusing the UN of failing to prevent what he described as the genocide of Palestinian civilians in Gaza by Israel, which he termed "[t]he European, ethno-nationalist, settler colonial project in Palestine". In his departure letter, Mokhiber referred to Israel's military actions in Gaza as "textbook genocide" and criticized the UN for failing to act, drawing parallels with previous genocides in Bosnia, Rwanda, and Myanmar. He called for a one-state solution, stating "We must support the establishment of a single, democratic secular state in all of historic Palestine, with equal rights for Christians, Muslims, and Jews, and, therefore, the dismantling of the deeply racist, settler-colonial project and an end to apartheid across the land." He called on the UN to apply the same standards to Israel as it does when assessing human rights violations in other countries around the world.

Mokhiber said he "resigned" from the United Nations, and much of the press reporting also used that term. The Office of the High Commissioner of Human Rights and the Secretary-General's spokesperson disputed that characterisation and said that he "retired".
