= International Association of Genocide Scholars =

International academic organization

The International Association of Genocide Scholars
- Abbreviation: IAGS
- Established: 1994; 32 years ago
- Type: 501(c)(3), Nonprofit
- Members: ~500
- President: Melanie O'Brien
- Website: genocidescholars.org

The International Association of Genocide Scholars (IAGS) is an international organization with a self-described mission to further research and teaching about the nature, causes, and consequences of genocide. The IAGS also advances policy studies on the prevention of genocide. The official peer-reviewed academic journal of the association is called Genocide Studies and Prevention.

The IAGS had around 500 members in 2025, and a number of sources describe it as the world's leading and largest organization of scholars studying genocide and crimes against humanity. Non-academics may join the IAGS, though the organization has stated that it is primarily made up of academics.

== History ==
According to the IAGS, its origin is based on the scholars who studied genocide in the 1980s including Helen Fein who published "Accounting for Genocide" in 1979 and Leo Kuper who published "Genocide" in 1982, and a genocide conference organised by Israel Charny in Jerusalem in 1982. The IAGS itself was created in 1994, initially with the name Association of Genocide Scholars and holding biennial conferences in the United States and Canada. In 2001, the name was changed to International Association of Genocide Scholars along with a change in the bylaws requiring at least one officer to be from outside of North America, and that the biennial conferences be "regularly" held outside of North America. The original group of scholars was small, with the first conference, held in June 1995 at the College of William & Mary in Williamsburg, Virginia in the US, taking place in a single room with about fifty participants. According to Jack Nusan Porter, the Williamsburg conference included Porter reading a paper by his colleague Steven T. Katz that led to major controversy at the meeting about whether the Holocaust was "the only 'true' genocide".

According to Porter, IAGS finances were managed "carelessly" prior to Porter becoming the treasurer in 2007 and Greg Stanton becoming president of the IAGS, which led to the financial management returning to "a firm footing". During Stanton's presidency, IAGS leaders visited Erbil to prepare a conference in Brussels on the Anfal campaign, a massacre of Kurds in Iraq under Saddam Hussein that Porter views as a genocide.

A parallel genocide researchers' association, the International Network of Genocide Scholars (INoGS), was created in 2005. Jack Nusan Porter describes INoGS as a split from the IAGS, mainly by European researchers, for two reasons: the researchers who created INoGS viewed IAGS as concentrating too much on declarations rather than research; and a public conflict occurred between Israel Charny and Martin Shaw over the assessment of Israel's role in the Deir Yassin massacre and its occupation of Palestinian territories. Charny described the creation of INoGS as occurring independently of IAGS, stating, "There was no prior collaboration with IAGS about the development of INOGS."

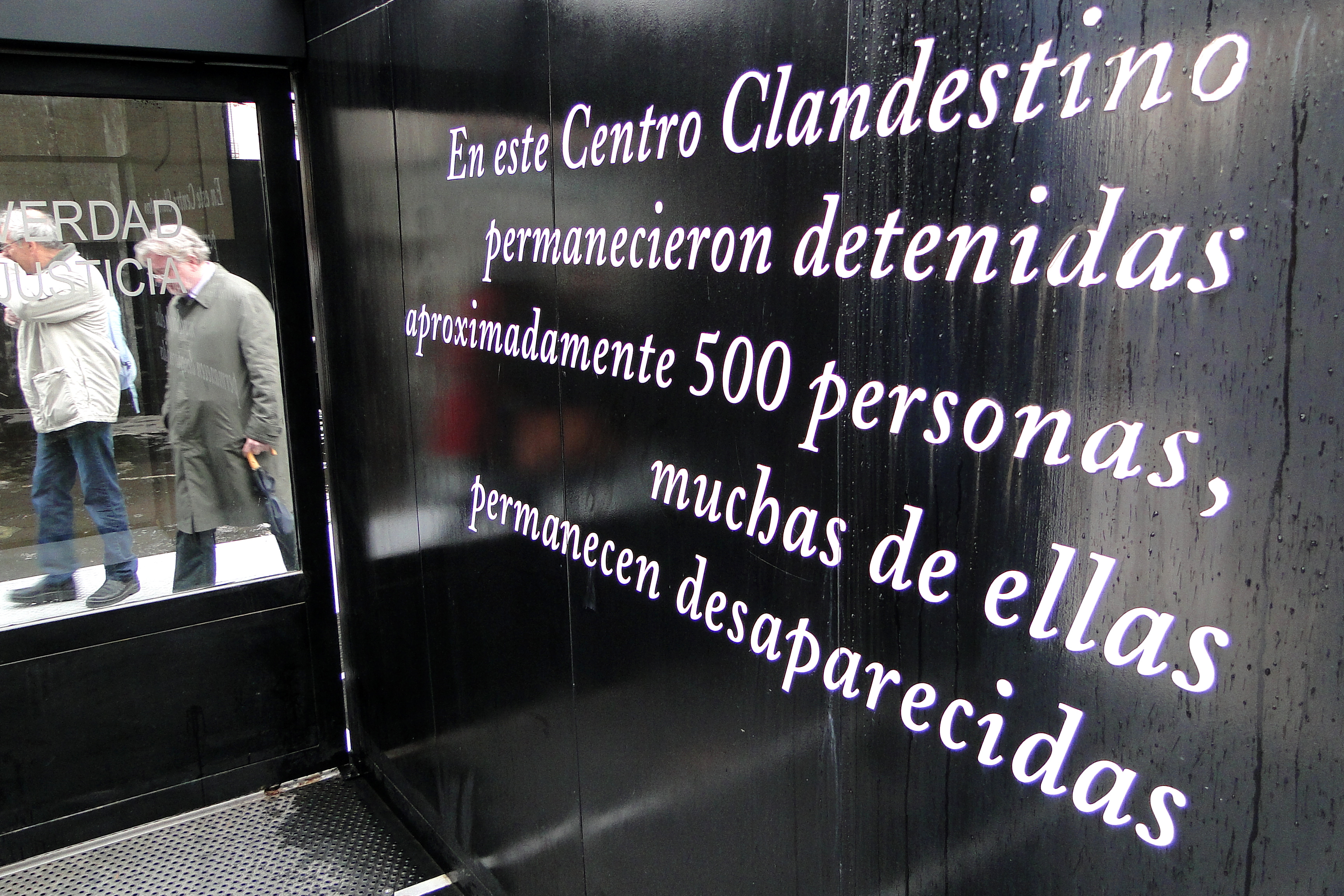
IAGS visitors at the Olimpo Detention and Torture Center, Buenos Aires, Argentina in 2011

Another publishing split occurred with the creation of the journal Genocide Studies International, in association with the International Institute for Genocide and Human Rights at the Zoryan Institute.

Since 2011, all IAGS conferences have been held outside the US. Conference locations have included Buenos Aires (2011), Yerevan (2015), Brisbane (2017), Barcelona (2023), and Johannesburg (2025, at the Johannesburg Holocaust and Genocide Centre).

Historically, the IAGS was criticized in the field who saw it as overly pro-Western and incorrect that robust military intervention by the West was a successful tactic to prevent genocide, as well as the implicit assumption that Western countries were not the perpetrators of genocide. Jürgen Zimmerer argued that instead of genocide being an aberration, perhaps "the world system is itself the root cause of genocide". A number of scholars, including Zimmerer, founded INoGS as an alternative to the IAGS.

== Structure and membership ==
The IAGS describes its members as including "academic scholars, human rights activists, students, museum and memorial professionals, policymakers, educators, anthropologists, independent scholars, sociologists, artists, political scientists, economists, historians, international law scholars, psychologists, and literature and film scholars." Despite the wide range of professions represented, the IAGS stated in early September 2025 that its membership was still composed primarily of "scholars/academics from a wide range of disciplines".

Jack Nusan Porter stated that the early membership of IAGS, during 1994–2007, was "mostly Jewish and Armenian, with some Israelis" and given the background of the founders, largely male and white. By 2023, according to Porter, IAGS had become "fully international and no longer American or European-centred", with "all conferences since 2011 [held] outside the USA."

In January 2012, IAGS stated that it had 339 members, about half from North America. As of 2015, IAGS had about 500 members. In October 2023, 150 members were listed publicly on the IAGS website, 280 in April 2024, and 440 on 1 September 2025.

=== Founders and presidents ===
The four main founders of IAGS were Helen Fein, Israel Charny, Robert Melson, and Roger W. Smith, all four who have been president of IAGS. Reverse chronologically, the presidents have been:

- Melanie O'Brien (2021–present)
- Henry Theriault (2017–2021)
- Andrew Woolford (2015–2017)
- Daniel Feierstein (2013–2015)
- Alexander Hinton (2011–2013)
- William Schabas (2009–2011)
- Gregory H. Stanton (2007–2009)
- Israel W. Charny (2005–2007)
- Robert Melson (2003–2005)
- Joyce Apsel (2001–2003)
- Frank Chalk (1999–2001)
- Roger W. Smith (1997–1999)
- Helen Fein (1995–1997)

=== Notable people ===
- Janja Beč, Serbian-born sociologist, genocide researcher, writer and lecturer

== Resolutions and statements ==
The International Association of Genocide Scholars (IAGS) issues formal positions either through its executive board, advisory board, or via resolutions passed by participating members. A resolution on a public issue passes only if over two-thirds of voters approve and more than 20% of members take part in the vote. The usual range of votes received for a resolution falls between 25 and 34%.

Meetings of resolution authors with the full membership are not required by the bylaws but are sometimes held. The resolutions passed by the IAGS reflect the association's scholarly assessments on genocide, mass atrocities, and denialism. The IAGS has passed resolutions and issued board statements addressing genocidal crimes and related matters in the following cases:

- Genocidal actions by Azerbaijan – including a siege, military offensive, and forced expulsion – against the Armenians of Nagorno-Karabakh, with two additional statements condemning the ongoing Azerbaijani aggression against Armenia
- The Armenian Genocide under the Ottoman Empire, with an open letter to Turkish state authorities in 2005, an open letter in 2006 to others who deny the genocide, and a 2007 executive board letter to the United States Congress in support of a resolution recognizing the genocide
- The genocide of the Kurds in Iraq, particularly the Anfal campaign
- The Bangladesh genocide during the war of independence in 1971, with 218 of 626 members (35%) taking part in the vote, of whom 208 approved the resolution, four rejected it and six abstained
- State-led atrocities against the Uyghurs in China
- Mass violence and displacement targeting the Rohingya in Myanmar, along with the 2022 condemnation of the banning of an IAGS member's scholarly work in Myanmar
- Mass atrocities committed during the Syrian Civil War
- Genocide of Assyrians and Greeks during the late Ottoman period
- Holocaust denial by Iranian president Mahmoud Ahmadinejad
- The Darfur genocide in western Sudan
- Crimes committed by ISIS against religious and ethnic minorities, including the Yazidis, Christians, Shia Muslims, and Sunni Kurds
- Political violence and repression in Zimbabwe under Robert Mugabe
- The situation in Ukraine following the 2022 Russian invasion
- Israel's policies and actions in Gaza, in response to the Hamas-led attacks of October 7, 2023, described by the resolution as meeting a legal definition of genocide

=== Response to the 2025 Gaza resolution ===
In 2025, the IAGS published a resolution stating Israel's policies and actions in Gaza in response to the Hamas-led attacks of October 7, 2023 meet a legal definition of genocide. Out of its around 500 members, 28% took part in the vote and 86% of those who voted supported the resolution. In response, the former IAGS Board member and genocide scholar Sara Brown said the process of passing the resolution was not transparent, and said when she attempted to publish a dissent, it was censored.

Additionally, the Academic Engagement Network (AEN) published an open letter authored by Elliot Malin urging the IAGS to retract the declaration. Titled "Scholars for Truth About Genocide", the letter was signed by several hundred people, including Eli M. Rosenbaum and several Holocaust educators and survivors' children, and was promoted by pro-Israel figures such as UK Lawyers for Israel and Israel's Ministry of Foreign Affairs. It argued that the IAGS resolution contained significant errors, such as overlooking the role of Hamas, and that accusing Israel of genocide devalued the legal definition of genocide.

The open letter was subsequently found to feature two signatories whose names had been added without their consent. A social media user also said they were able to sign up with false information, revealing overly lax standards for inclusion. In response to allegations of wrongdoing, AEN executive director Miriam Elman said the letter had been subjected to "sabotage attempts." The fact-checking website Misbar reported that there was no evidence of activity by Scholars for Truth About Genocide prior to the letter's publication; that the signatories to the letter included "some academics and experts in history, law, and the Holocaust" but "their numbers are very small compared to the total 514 signatories" which included political advocacy groups, individuals without relevant expertise like graphic designers, or odd entries like "CEO, Tel Aviv University"; and that the letter relied "on selective citations, omission, and misleading framing, falling short of the academic standards required to engage with the IAGS report."

== See also ==
- International Network of Genocide Scholars
- Outline of genocide studies
