= Raz Segal =

Israeli historian

- רז סגל
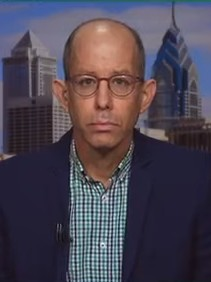
- Segal in 2023

Academic background
- Education: Bar-Ilan University (BA in economics); Tel Aviv University (MA); Clark University (PhD)

Academic work
- Discipline: Historian
- Institutions: Stockton University
- Main interests: Genocide studies

Raz Segal (Hebrew: רז סגל) is an Israeli and American historian residing in the United States, who is Associate Professor of Holocaust and Genocide Studies and Endowed Professor in the Study of Modern Genocide at Stockton University, where he also directs the Master of Arts in Holocaust and Genocide Studies program. He has written multiple books about the Holocaust in Carpathian Ruthenia, based on analysis of primary and secondary sources in Hebrew, English, German, Yiddish, and Hungarian.

== During the Gaza war ==
In the context of the Gaza war, Segal has described Israel's complete blockade—which included the denial of water, food, power, and fuel to the civilian population of the Gaza Strip—as a "textbook case of genocide" and connected it to the Nakba, the expulsion of Palestinians during the establishment of Israel in 1948. According to Segal, the Israel Defense Forces (IDF) are actively engaged in three genocidal actions: acts of killing, infliction of severe bodily harm, and implementation of measures strategically designed to destroy Palestinian existence. As evidence, he cites the IDF's strategy of total warfare, destroying mass swathes of Gaza and imposing a strict blockade of essential goods. His op-ed was credited with opening discussions about the Gaza genocide.

Segal's accusations of genocide caused the cancellation of a job offer from the University of Minnesota for him to lead the Center for Holocaust and Genocide Studies. The rescission was the result of a campaign led by the pro-Israel group Jewish Community Relations Council of Minnesota and the Dakotas and the resignation of two of the center's board members in opposition to Segal's selection. The withdrawal led UMN faculty to pass a non-confidence motion against interim president Jeff Ettinger and the provost and a call for reinstatement by the American Association of University Professors. Around the start of August 2026, Segal was paid a $250,000 settlement by the university. The Guardian reported that the settlement came after Segal had obtained "dozens of emails through a public records request", which revealed "a pressure campaign on university officials by donors, legislators and pro-Israel activists". At the time of the settlement, he was tenured professor at Stockton University in New Jersey.

Following a complaint from John F. Scarpa, a cable and cellular phone executive who donated millions of dollars to Stockton University, in 2026 Stockton removed a statement from Segal about "Israel’s ongoing genocide in Gaza" from the webpage of the Stockton master’s program in Holocaust and Genocide Studies.

== Works ==
- Segal, Raz (2013). Days of Ruin: The Jews of Munkács During the Holocaust. Yad Vashem. ISBN 978-965-308-428-5.
- Segal, Raz (2016). Genocide in the Carpathians: War, Social Breakdown, and Mass Violence, 1914–1945. Stanford University Press. ISBN 978-0-8047-9897-6.
