= UK Lawyers for Israel =

Pro-Israel activist group

- Formation: September 2016; 10 years ago
- Chief Executive: Jonathan Turner
- Chairs: Lady Hazel Cosgrove; Jonathan Lux
- Website: www.uklfi.com

UK Lawyers for Israel (UKLFI) is a pro-Israel activist group in the United Kingdom. UKLFI is known for launching numerous legal claims against what it sees as anti-Israel activities, sometimes described as "lawfare". It challenged the UK Government over its suspension of 30 arms export licences to Israel and raised a complaint about the International Criminal Court’s seeking of arrest warrants against Israeli ministers.

Natasha Hausdorff, who joined UKLFI in 2014, has been described as the organisation's public figure, appearing on news shows and giving evidence to the foreign affairs select committee.

== Activities ==
UK Lawyers for Israel was sued for libel by Defence for Children International – Palestine (DCIP), following the consistent allegations by UKLFI since 2018 that DCIP had links to terrorist groups. The two parties settled out of court, part of which involved UKLFI stating, "we did not intend to suggest that the organisation has close current links, or provides any financial or material support to any terrorist organisation.".

The group was scheduled to host in 2019 a speaker from Regavim, a pro-settler organisation founded by Bezalel Smotrich. The subject of the talk was to be "The Struggle to Preserve Israel's Land". The event was criticised by the Jewish Labour Movement and Yachad. Vivian Wineman, former president of the Board of Deputies of British Jews, called Regavim "the worst racist representatives of Israel politics" and said they "do more to legitimise the Palestinian cause than any number of speeches from pro-Palestinian MPs." The talk was eventually cancelled, which UKLFI said was due to a planned protest by "a consortium of BDS activists and anti-Israel groups".

In 2019, UKLFI accused two British textbooks of "anti-Israel propaganda." In response, the textbook publisher Pearson withdrew the books and coordinated with UKLFI in rewriting the material. The resulting revisions were criticised by John Chalcraft, a Middle East history professor at the London School of Economics as pro-Israel "propaganda under the guise of education". Pearson subsequently withdrew the textbooks again as a result.

In 2023, UKLFI filed a complaint against Chelsea and Westminster Hospital over an artwork display of decorated plates, designed by children at two United Nations schools in Gaza, at the entrance to the children’s outpatients department. The complaint stated that the artwork made Jewish patients feel "vulnerable, harassed and victimised". UKLFI CEO Jonathan Turner called the display "a wall of anti-Israel propaganda." The hospital removed the artwork in response to the complaint.

UKLFI asked the Open University to remove the phrase "ancient Palestine" from its teaching materials because it regarded the phrase as "problematic" given "contemporary political sensitivities". The university responded that it would no longer use the phrase in its teaching. The British Society for Middle Eastern Studies (BRISMES) said the phrase was widely used in historical scholarship to denote the Roman province and described the university's action as part of a "widespread clampdown on freedom of expression and academic freedom with regard to Palestine". BRISMES wrote to the University stating that its actions breached its legal requirement to protect lawful academic expression.

In February 2026, UKLIF sent a letter to the British Museum denouncing the inclusion of the word "Palestine" in some displays and the description of some depicted people as being "of Palestinian descent." In response, the museum removed the terms, stating that they were used "inaccurately" and are "no longer historically neutral." In a statement, the museum acknowledged that the term "Palestine" is "well established in western and Middle Eastern scholarship as a geographical and 'neutral' designation for the southern area of the Levant since the late 19th century," but added that it has also become a term without a neutral "designation.".

=== Gaza War ===
During the Gaza War, Jonathan Turner criticised a Lancet analysis on impact of the conflict on life expectancy in Gaza. Turner stated that the war might reduce obesity in Gaza and "increase average life expectancy in Gaza". The Palestine Solidarity Campaign said Turner's remarks were "utterly sickening" and "illustrate exactly what it means to be 'for Israel' and how low its apologists are prepared to sink in their attempts to justify genocide in Gaza." The Council for Arab-British Understanding said that Turner's comments were "atrocious". In response, Turner said his statement was "accurate and objective" and that the Lancet letter was based on "entirely unfounded speculation, which also ignored factors that might result in lengthening the lives of Gazans".

On 27 May 2025, a report was published by UK advocacy organisation CAGE International accusing UKLFI of "concealing its funding sources, refusing to disclose the financial backers driving its campaign of professional harassment and governance, and institutional racism". In August 2025, it was reported that the UK Charity Commission was investigating a complaint against UKLFI, raised by CAGE International. That same month, the Public Interest Law Centre and the European Legal Support Center, a pro-Palestine advocacy group, filed a complaint with the Solicitors Regulation Authority against UKLFI over its alleged use of SLAPPs and operating as an unregulated law firm.

In September 2026, it was reported that UKLFI had written to Home Secretary Shabana Mahmood to demand that humanitarian charity Médecins Sans Frontières be proscribed as a terrorist group due to alleged links to Palestinian militant groups.

== See also ==
- Israel lobby in the United Kingdom
