= Paradigm Lost =

2019 book by Ian S. Lustick

- Author: Ian S. Lustick
- Genre: Nonfiction
- Publisher: University of Pennsylvania Press
- Publication date: November 15, 2019
- Pages: 232
- ISBN: 978-0812251951

Paradigm Lost: From Two-State Solution to One-State Reality is a 2019 book about the Israeli–Palestinian conflict by American political scientist Ian S. Lustick, published by the University of Pennsylvania Press. Lustick formerly supported the two-state solution, but in the book he analyzes the reasons why, in his view, this solution has become unviable. He proposes working with the current one-state reality—in which a single state controls the entirety of Israel/Palestine—in order to achieve democratization and equal rights for all inhabitants. Many reviewers agreed with Lustick's diagnosis of the current situation as a one-state reality, but several questioned the likelihood of his proposed solution.

== Background ==
Ian S. Lustick is a political scientist and Bess W. Heyman Chair at the University of Pennsylvania. For decades, he supported the two-state solution for the Israeli–Palestinian conflict, but abandoned this in 2013. Lustick was one of the founders of the Association for Israel Studies and served as its president. The English version of the book was published in 2019 and a Hebrew translation was released by Resling in 2022.

== Argument ==
Lustick argues that the proposed two-state solution (TSS) is unlikely to materialize and that the current reality on the ground is one of "one and only one state [Israel] ruling the territory between the Mediterranean Sea and the Jordan River", under what he calls the "one-state reality" (OSR). Lustick views the failure of the two-state solution as primarily due to Israel, which had overwhelming military superiority and controlled the Palestinian territories from 1967 onwards.

Lustick argues that three elements of Israeli society led to a failure to compromise by Israel's leaders. First, while the Iron Wall strategy accurately predicted Arab responses to Zionist victories, it did not predict that these victories would entrench maximalism and refusal to compromise by Israel. Second, he argues that the prominence of memory of the Holocaust in Israel and the lessons drawn from it led to seeing threats to Israel as Nazis, which harms the prospects of a negotiated peace. Third, he argues that the Israel lobby in the United States has pressed the United States government to support Israel in the conflict, marginalizing moderates in Israel.

The fourth chapter of the book addresses why Lustick believes the two-state solution is unlikely and the last chapter presents alternatives. Lustick argues for establishing a single democratic state in Israel/Palestine with equal rights for all inhabitants, but according to him it will probably take decades to establish and is not guaranteed.

== Reception ==
Oren Barak, political scientist at Hebrew University of Jerusalem, called the book "well-written and thought-provoking", with its arguments "supported by ample evidence". He said it would be helpful to policy makers and other readers.

Yasmeen Abu-Laban, political scientist at the University of Alberta, called the book a "well-written and carefully researched new volume" and "an important intervention in the literature on Israel/Palestine". However, she argues that Lustick ignores the literature on settler colonialism and Zionism as an example thereof: "From the perspective of settler-colonial studies, there is nothing unusual in the violence associated with the Iron Wall strategy, nor is there anything unintentional about continually seizing land, controlling resources, and blatantly denying self-rule to the Indigenous population through codification of discriminatory treatment."

According to political scientist Nathan J. Brown, "Paradigm Lost declares what most observers have come to recognize is the case". Brown argues that Lustick exaggerates the two-state solution, which Brown says did not become paradigmatic until it was no longer realistic. Brown sees a weakness in the book as its lack of attention to Palestinian politics and "the desiccation of Palestinian national institutions" in the failure of the two-state solution.

Lawrence Davidson calls it "a good book: well written, well researched and presenting a necessary and welcome argument". However, Davidson argues that the Palestinian–Jewish cooperation that Lustick called for was coming into existence in the early twentieth century, but was destroyed by Zionism. He is not optimistic that democratization can be achieved.

David Abraham, Marxist historian and professor emeritus of Law at the University of Miami, argues that the solutions Lustick proposes are improbable, overlooking anti-normalization sentiment in Palestinian society as well as overestimating the likelihood that Israeli annexation supporters would choose equality over apartheid: "the incentives for the OSR programme today are as lacking as those for the TSS". Yoav Peled describes Paradigm Lost as "a path-breaking book, anchoring the credo of the 'one-state reality paradigm' in a foundational text" but criticizes some minor errors.

The book received a book forum in Israel Studies Review. According to Oded Haklai, political scientist at Queen's University at Kingston, Lustick is proposing to change the institutional design approach to a social realignment approach. However, he disputes Lustick's suggestions for resolving the conflict, because in his view there is little likelihood that social realignment can occur and minority rule has been stable in other countries. Ronnie Olesker argues that Lustick's diagnosis is correct but his proposals are overly optimistic as to the likelihood of democratizing the one-state reality. Mira Sucharov, Jewish political scientist at Carleton University, argues that the book overlooks some issues, such as Palestinian refugees, and says that some readers will consider the obstacles to a single democratic state more insurmountable than to the TSS, although overall she agrees with his argument. Ehud Eiran, political scientist and member of the think tank Mitvim, called it an "important book" but said that there are still some aspects of reality that point to a TSS and argues that realities can shift in the future.

Dov Waxman described the book as a "provocative and pathbreaking study of the conflict", "short and succinct... clearly written, tightly argued, and very timely". Although he argues that the book neglects Palestinian politics and therefore presents a "somewhat skewed and incomplete" account of the failure of the TSS, it is convincing on others—such as treating all of Israel/Palestine as a single, nondemocratic entity—and at a minimum would stimulate thinking and discussion.

Former Meretz MK Naomi Chazan says that "Lustick's reading of the retrogressive trajectory of the two-state strategy is difficult to dispute" and even committed two-state supporters struggle to argue that it is still viable. She argues that the contribution of the book is in forcing readers to consider questions of future political settlements for Israel/Palestine.
