= Nimer Sultany =

Palestinian author on law and identity

- נימר סולטני
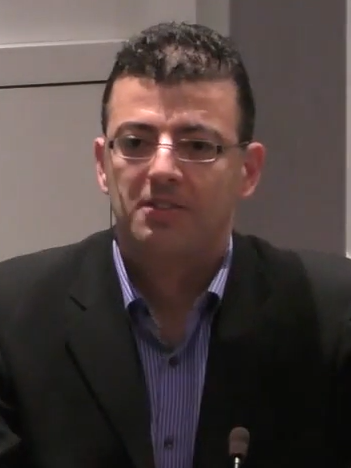
- Sultany in 2015
- Born: Tira, Israel
- Education: Tel Aviv University; University of Virginia; Harvard Law School
- Occupation: Author

Nimer Sultany (Hebrew: נימר סולטני) is a Palestinian citizen of Israel, the author of two books on the situation of Palestinian citizens of that country, and a work on constitutional theory and Arab countries. He is a regular contributor to The Guardian and Jadaliyya.

== Biography ==
Sultany was born in Tira. He earned a Master's degree in law at Tel Aviv University. In the early 2000s he was coordinator of the Political Monitoring Project at the Haifa-based Arab Center for Applied Social Research-Mada. After another master's degree in Law from the University of Virginia, he enrolled in Harvard Law School where he obtained a Doctorate in Juridical Science (SJD), the most advanced law degree of its kind. At present he is Reader in Public law at SOAS in London.

In 2017 Oxford University Press published his major theoretical study Law and Revolution: Legitimacy and Constitutionalism After the Arab Spring, which was awarded the inaugural ICON-S book prize in 2018.

== Law and Revolution ==
Sultany's book is divided into three parts. In each, revolutions are examined in terms of a concept of legitimacy, legality and constitutionalism. His starting point is to analyse and challenge Nathan Brown's view that the dominant polity of the Arab world is one of "constitutions without constitutionalism". (Note: "Over the past century and a half, the Arab world has grown rich in constitutions – documents that spell out the basic legal framework for governing – without growing richer in constitutionalisms-limited and accounted government. Basic laws have proliferated but few Arab governments have been restricted in their authority by them." (Brown 2012, p. xiv))

== Sources ==
- Brown, Nathan J. (2012). Constitutions in a Nonconstitutional World: Arab Basic Laws and the Prospects for Accountable Government. SUNY Press. ISBN 978-0-791-48968-0.
- Brown, Nathan J. (January 2019). "Book Review". International Journal of Constitutional Law. 17 (1): 357–361. doi:10.1093/icon/moz013.
- "Dr Nimer Sultany". SOAS School of Law.
- Hajjar, Lisa (2018). "Review of Sultany 2017". British Journal of Middle Eastern Studies. 45 (5): 860–862. doi:10.1080/13530194.2018.1496707. S2CID 150115121.
- "Nimer Sultany". Jadaliyya. Arab Studies Institute.
- "Nimer Sultany". The Guardian.
- Razai, Sara S. (31 August 2018). "Book Review: Law and Revolution: Legitimacy and Constitutionalism After the Arab Spring By Nimer Sultany". The Legal Agenda.
- Rouhana, Nadim N.; Sultany, Nimer (Autumn 2003). "Redrawing the Boundaries of Citizenship: Israel's New Hegemony". Journal of Palestine Studies. 33 (1): 5–22. doi:10.1525/jps.2003.33.1.5. JSTOR 10.1525/jps.2003.33.1.5.
- Sultany, Nimer (2003). Citizens Without Citizenship: Israel and the Palestinian Minority, 2000-2002. Haifa: Mada al-Carmel Arab Center for Applied Social Research. ISBN 978-9-659-05731-3.
- Sultany, Nimer (2005). Israel And the Palestinian Minority 2004. Mada al-Carmel Arab Center for Applied Social Research. ISBN 978-9-657-30802-8.
- Sultany, Nimer (Winter 2012). "The Making of an Underclass: The Palestinian Citizens in Israel". Israel Studies Review. 27 (2): 190–200. JSTOR 41804808.
- Sultany, Nimer (2017). Law and Revolution: Legitimacy and Constitutionalism After the Arab Spring. Oxford University Press. ISBN 978-0-198-76889-0.
- Sultany, Nimer (10 June 2020). "Legal Structure, Practices, and Discourse in the Middle East". The Palestine Yearbook of International Law. 21: 201–212. doi:10.1163/22116141_021010005. S2CID 225709389.
- Sultany, Nimer (19 May 2021). "Peaceful coexistence in Israel hasn't been shattered – it's always been a myth". The Guardian.
- Sultany, Nimer (9 May 2024). "A Threshold Crossed: On Genocidal Intent and the Duty to Prevent Genocide in Palestine". Journal of Genocide Research: 1–26. doi:10.1080/14623528.2024.2351261.
- Takriti, Abdel Razzaq (August 2020). "Review: Law and Revolution". International Journal of Middle East Studies. 52 (3): 588–590. doi:10.1017/S0020743820000525. S2CID 225444111.
