= Ian Lustick =

American political scientist (born 1949)

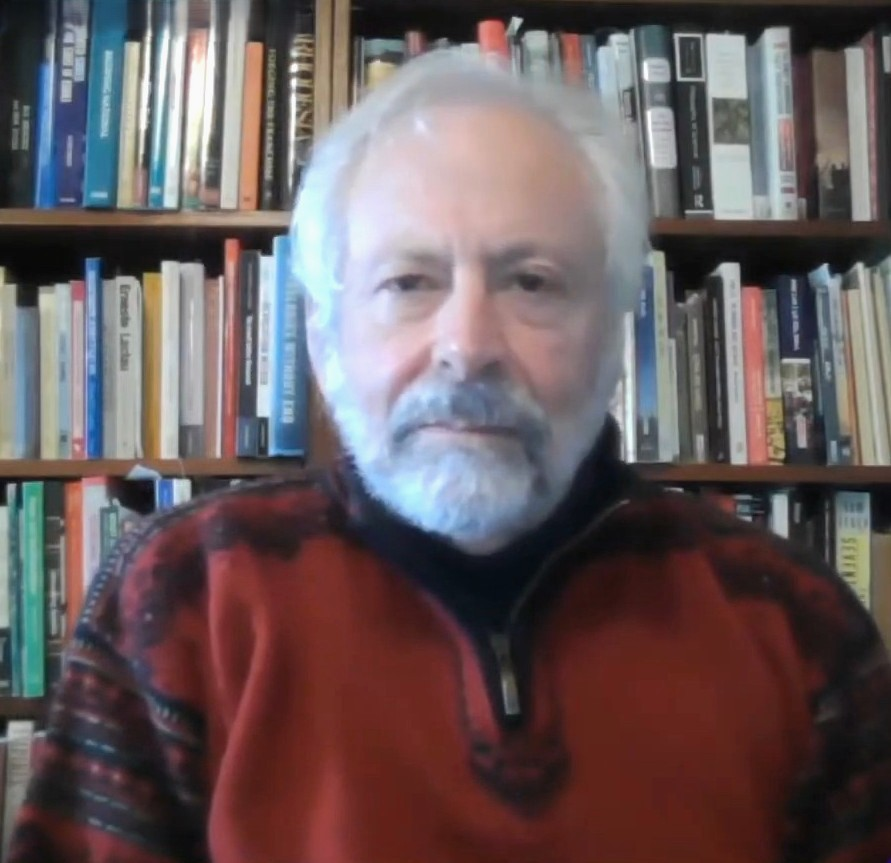
Lustick in 2022

Ian Steven Lustick (born in 1949) is an American political scientist and specialist on the modern history and politics of the Middle East. He holds the Bess W. Heyman Chair in the department of political sciences at the University of Pennsylvania.

== Early life ==
Lustick was born to a Jewish family in Syracuse, New York in 1949. His father was a pediatrician. His grandfather, Alex Lustick, was a farmer. Eager to get out of the "rat race" of Syracuse metropolitan life, the family relocated to Watertown in the northern rural area of Jefferson County, New York. Lustick likened conditions there to those of an eastern European Jewish shtetl, and he was occasionally the object of antisemitic harassment. Nonetheless, his family had a strong sense of patriotic attachment to the United States.

After graduating from high school, Lustick attended Brandeis University in Massachusetts, arriving in 1967 just as a countercultural wave of student activism was sweeping through college campuses in the country. He completed his Ph.D. at the University of California, Berkeley in 1976. His dissertation was Arabs in the Jewish State: a study in the effective control of a minority population, later adapted into a book, which was published in 1980.

== Career ==
Lustick spent 1979–1980 as an intelligence analyst, specializing in the problems of Israel's occupation of the Palestinian territories, for the Bureau of Intelligence and Research of the Department of State. Thereafter, in the summer of 1980, he returned to academia.

He was appointed assistant professor of government at Dartmouth College in 1976, where he taught for 15 years. He then joined the Political Science Department at the University of Pennsylvania, where he held the Richard L. Simon Term Professor in the Social Sciences. He then became chair of the department and was named the Bess W. Heyman Professor. In 2021 he moved to emeritus status, but continues to teach and conduct research at the University of Pennsylvania.

He is a founder and past president of the Association for Israel Studies and past president of the American Political Science Association-Politics and History Section. Lustick became more broadly known with the publication of his book Trapped in the War on Terror (2006) in which he argues that the war on terrorism is an irrational policy for fighting America's enemies. (Note: "Seldom ... had the American government or the American political system as a whole reacted to a problem more irrationally than it has in responding to the attacks of September 11, 2001, with the War on Terror. The result has been not only waste on a colossal scale and camouflage for a host of selfish and destructive projects by well-positioned zealots but the emergence of a War on Terror that is itself a more fearsome enemy than the terrorists it was putatively designed to fight." (Lustick 2006, pp. 1–2)) He argues that this policy was initially conceived of by a neo-conservative cabal (Note: Lustick drew an historical analogy with the junto (a term early used of a group dominating the Whig party in Great Britain) or cabal of politicians and activists who manoeuvered America into a war with Mexico and the annexation of Texas in order to secure a further expansion of the country west and south of its established borders (Lustick 2006, p. 49).) at the Project for a New American Century who were determined to shift the direction of U.S. foreign policy towards unilateralism. Given a number of political features unique to the US system, Lustick concluded, the war on terror has ultimately turned into something beyond anyone's control. (Note: "The mechanisms that power this whirlwind are not under the control of any group or collection of individuals." (Lustick 2006, p. 71))

He has engaged in research involving applications of evolutionary and complexity theory to the development of computer simulations using agent-based models for research and policy analysis. Between 2010 and the present day, Lustick has returned to some prominence by writing articles that variously called for Israel to negotiate with Hamas over the future of the area and said that the only way to resolve the war between Israelis and Palestinians was to gradually democratize the "one-state reality" which Israel's de facto annexation of the territories it occupied in 1967 has produced.

He is a member of the American Political Science Association, the Middle East Studies Association, and the Council on Foreign Relations.

== Reception ==
In a 1989 review of Lustick's early work, the anti-Zionist American rabbi Elmer Berger called Lustick a "first-class Zionist academic", and praised his "meticulous scholarship".

In 1988, Lustick published his For the Land and the Lord a study of religious fundamentalism in Israel. It appeared under the imprint of a series of monographs the Council of Foreign Relations considered a "responsible treatment(s) of a significant international topic worthy of presentation to the public." In this work, according to Joel Brinkley, he suggested that, were it not for Israel's on-going conflict with its regional neighbours, Israel itself might find itself embroiled in a civil war between the opposing poles of secular forces and fundamentalist religious Zionists. (Note: "Indeed, it is Ian S. Lustick's theory that if it weren't for the preoccupying regional conflict between Arabs and Jews, Israel would find itself caught in another war, this one civil." (Brinkley 1988, p. 13; Lustick 1988, pp. 182–183)) (Note: "In the writings of one such theorist the most 'vitriolic language' is not aimed at Gentiles, 'but for Israeli opponents of Gush Emunum, especially those who object to the fundamentalist movement on liberal democratic grounds' (p.123). Democracy as a political system has been the target of numerous attacks from the pens of fundamentalists, and the very idea of majority rule deemed foreign and subversive of Torah Judaism. Only at peril can one ignore the possibility of violence being used against Jewish opponents of the fundamentalists should they achieve a position making this feasible." (Sobel 1989, p. 229))

Elmer Berger wrote that he knew of "no better documented source in English for anyone interested in greater understanding of both the parties and the leading representatives of this phenomenon" (of Israeli religious fundamentalism). (Note: "no better documented source in English for anyone interested in greater understanding of both the parties and the leading representatives of this phenomenon" and its increasing influence in a society often heralded as sharing the values of American democracy and as a bastion of liberal thought in a sea of revolutionary and unreliable Arab regimes (Berger 1989, p. 114).) At the same time, he argued that Lustick shared shortcomings discernible in the works of Israel's revisionist New Historians in that the territorial expansionism and racial discrimination documented as recent Zionist trends by the 1980s wave of young Zionist scholars – Lustick charts these traits as bursting into the secular mainstream of Israeli society with the emergence of messianic movements like Gush Emunim in the 1970s – underplayed, minimized or whitewashed tendencies that were intrinsic to Zionism from its pristine beginnings.

In 2019, Lustick published a new book, Paradigm Lost: From Two-State Solution to One-State Reality, which analyzes the origins and implications of the disappearance of the two-state solution. George Washington University's Nathan Brown stated in his review that he found the book "accessible, forceful, and concise. Its tone will rub some readers the wrong way but strike others as admirably frank."

== Selected publications ==
- Lustick, Ian S. (1980). Arabs in the Jewish State: Israel's control of a national minority (2nd ed.). University of Texas Press. ISBN 978-0-292-70348-3.
- State-building failure in British Ireland & French Algeria. Berkeley, Calif.: Institute of International Studies, University of California, Berkeley, c1985. (x, 109 p.)
- Israel's Dangerous Fundamentalists, by Ian S. Lustick, in Foreign Policy, Number 68, Fall 1987, pp. 118–139
- For the land and the Lord: Jewish fundamentalism in Israel. Council on Foreign Relations. 1988.
- Critical essays on Israeli society, politics, and culture, editors Ian S. Lustick and Barry Rubin. Albany: State University of New York Press, c1991. (xi, 204 p.)
- Unsettled states, disputed lands: Britain and Ireland, France and Algeria, Israel and the West Bank-Gaza. Ithaca, N.Y.: Cornell University Press, 1993
- Arab-Israeli relations: historical background and origins of the conflict, edited with introductions by Ian S. Lustick. New York: Garland, 1994. (xiii, 409 p.)
- Palestinians under Israeli rule, edited with introductions by Ian S. Lustick. New York: Garland, 1994 (xiv, 333 p).
- Economic, legal, and demographic dimensions of Arab-Israeli relations, edited, with introductions by Ian S. Lustick. New York: Garland Pub., 1994. (xii, 349 p.)
- Arab-Israeli relations in world politics, edited with introductions by Ian S. Lustick. New York: Garland Pub., 1994. (xiii, 345 p.)
- The Conflict with the Arabs in Israeli politics and society, edited with introductions by Ian S. Lustick. New York: Garland, 1994. (xi, 369 p.)
- The conflict with Israel in Arab politics and society, edited with introductions by Ian S. Lustick. New York: Garland Pub., 1994. (xii, 393 p.)
- From war to war: Israel vs. the Arabs, 1948–1967, edited with introductions by Ian S. Lustick. New York: Garland Pub., 1994. (xii, 321 p.)
- From wars toward peace in the Arab-Israeli conflict, 1969–1993, edited with introductions by Ian S. Lustick. New York: Garland Pub., 1994. (xiii, 355 p.)
- "The absence of Middle Eastern great powers: political 'backwardness' in historical perspective", International Organization, 1997 (51):4, pp. 653–683.
- "Lijphart, Lakatos, and consociationalism", World Politics, 1997 (50):1, pp. 88–117
- Right-sizing the state: the politics of moving borders, edited by Brendan O'Leary, Ian S. Lustick and Thomas Callaghy. Oxford: Oxford University Press, 2001
- Exile and return: predicaments of Palestinians and Jews, edited by Ann M. Lesch and Ian S. Lustick. Philadelphia: University of Pennsylvania Press, c2005.
- Trapped in the War on Terror. Philadelphia: University of Pennsylvania Press, 2006. (xii, 186p.)
- Paradigm Lost: From Two-State Solution to One-State Reality. University of Pennsylvania Press, 2019.
- Israel's Lobby, 2026

== See also ==
- Historical institutionalism

== Sources and further reading ==
- Berger, Elmer (Fall 1989). "Review: The Fundamentals of Israeli "Fundamentalism"". Arab Studies Quarterly. 11 (4): 109–117. JSTOR 41858925.
- Brinkley, Joel (October 23, 1988). "Israel's Other War". The New York Times. p. 13.
- Brown, Nathan (Spring 2020). "Review of 'Paradigm Lost: From Two-State Solution to One-State Reality by Ian S. Lustick". The Middle East Journal. 74 (1): 137–138 – via Project MUSE.
- Campbell, John C. (January 28, 2009). "For The Land And The Lord: Jewish Fundamentalism In Israel". Foreign Affairs.
- Della Pergola, Sergio (Winter 2011). "When scholarship Disturbs Narrative: Ian Lustick on Israel's Migration Balance". Israel Studies Review. 28 (2): 1–20. JSTOR 41804759.
- Lustick, Ian S. (1988). For the Land and the Lord: Jewish Fundamentalism in Israel. Council on Foreign Relations. ISBN 978-0-876-09036-7.
- Lustick, Ian S. (January 31, 2000). "Agent-based modelling of collective identity: testing constructivist theory". Journal of Artificial Societies and Social Simulation. 3 (3).
- Lustick, Ian S. (2006). Trapped in the War on Terror. University of Pennsylvania Press. ISBN 978-0-812-23983-6.
- Lustick, Ian S. (Summer 2011). "Israel's Migration Balance: Demography, Politics, and Ideology". Israel Studies Review. 26 (1): 33–65. doi:10.3167/isr.2011.260108.
- Lustick, Ian S. (Spring 2013). "What Counts is the Counting: Statistical Manipulation as a Solution to Israel's "Demographic Problem"". Middle East Journal. 67 (2): 185–205. doi:10.3751/67.2.12. S2CID 143466620 – via ResearchGate.
- Lustick, Ian S. (2018) [First published 1983]. Unsettled States, Disputed Lands: Britain and Ireland, France and Algeria, Israel and the West Bank-Gaza. Cornell University Press. ISBN 978-1-501-73194-5.
- Lustick, Ian S. (2019). Paradigm Lost: From Two-State Solution to One-State Reality. University of Pennsylvania Press. ISBN 978-0-812-25195-1.
- Lustick, Ian S. (Spring 2019). "The Red Thread of Israel's "Demographic Problem"". Middle East Policy. 26 (1): 141–149. doi:10.1111/mepo.12406. S2CID 106403058.
- Lustick, Ian S.; Kreisler, Harry (March 4, 2002). "Conversations with History: Harry Kreisler interviews Ian Lustick". University of California, Berkeley – via YouTube.
- Lustick, Ian S.; Lesch, Ann M (2008). "The Failure of Oslo and the Abiding Question of the Refugees". In Lustick, Ian S.; Lesch, Ann M. (eds.). Exile and Return: Predicaments of Palestinians and Jews. University of Pennsylvania Press. pp. 3–17. ISBN 978-0-812-22052-0.
- Lustick, Ian S.; Wilcox, Philip C. (December 17, 2019). "A conversation with Professor Ian Lustick on the Two State paradigm". Foundation for Middle East Peace.
- Medad, Yisrael (May 2020). "Book Review/ Paradigm Lost: From Two-State Solution to One-State Reality". Fathom. BICOM.
- Shafir, Gershon (Spring 1989). "Review of ^For the Land and the Lord?'". Newsletter (Association for Israel Studies). 4 (2): 25–27. JSTOR 41805780.
- Sobel, Zvi (May 1989). "A Review Essay". Modern Judaism. 9 (2): 227–234. doi:10.1093/mj/9.2.227. JSTOR 1396316.
- "Standing Faculty: Ian Lustick". Department of Political Science at the University of Pennsylvania. May 2020.
