= Paradox of tolerance =

Logical paradox in decision-making theory

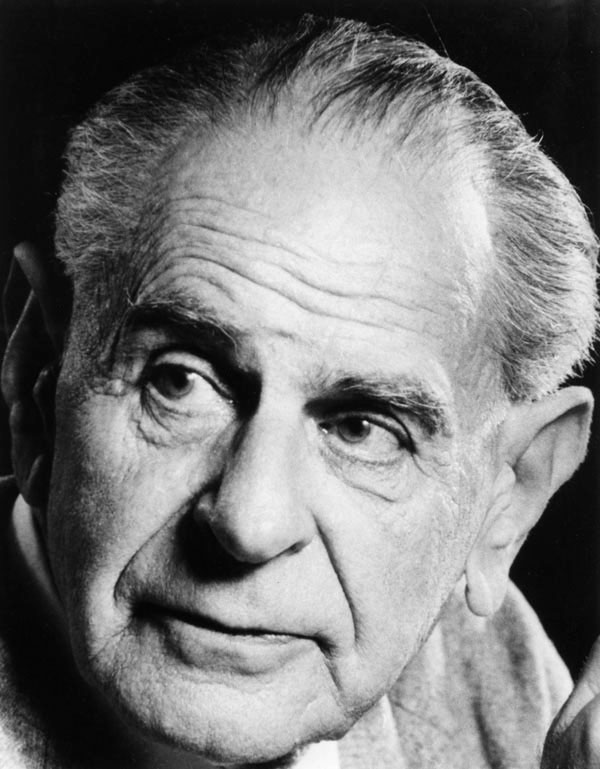
Karl Popper wrote on tolerance of intolerance in Vol. 1 of The Open Society and Its Enemies, published in 1945.

The paradox of tolerance is a philosophical concept suggesting that if a society extends tolerance to those who are intolerant, it risks enabling the eventual dominance of intolerance, thereby undermining the very principle of tolerance. This paradox was articulated by the Austrian-British philosopher Karl Popper in The Open Society and Its Enemies (1945), where he argued that a truly tolerant society must retain the right to deny tolerance to those who promote intolerance. Popper posited that if intolerant ideologies are allowed unchecked expression, they could exploit open society values to erode or destroy tolerance itself through authoritarian or oppressive practices.

In his own words:

"[...] But we should claim the right to suppress them [intolerant ideologies] if necessary even by force; for it may easily turn out that they are not prepared to meet us on the level of rational argument, but begin by denouncing all argument; they may forbid their followers to listen to rational argument, because it is deceptive, and teach them to answer arguments by the use of their fists or pistols."

The paradox has been widely discussed within ethics and political philosophy, with varying views on how tolerant societies should respond to intolerant forces. John Rawls, for instance, argued that a just society should generally tolerate the intolerant, reserving self-preserving actions for only when intolerance poses a concrete threat to liberty and stability. Other thinkers, such as Michael Walzer, have examined how minority groups, which may hold intolerant beliefs, are nevertheless beneficiaries of tolerance within pluralistic societies.

This paradox raises complex issues about the limits of freedom, especially concerning free speech and the protection of liberal democratic values. It has implications for contemporary debates on managing hate speech, political violence, political extremism, and social policies aimed at fostering inclusivity without compromising the integrity of democratic tolerance.

== History ==
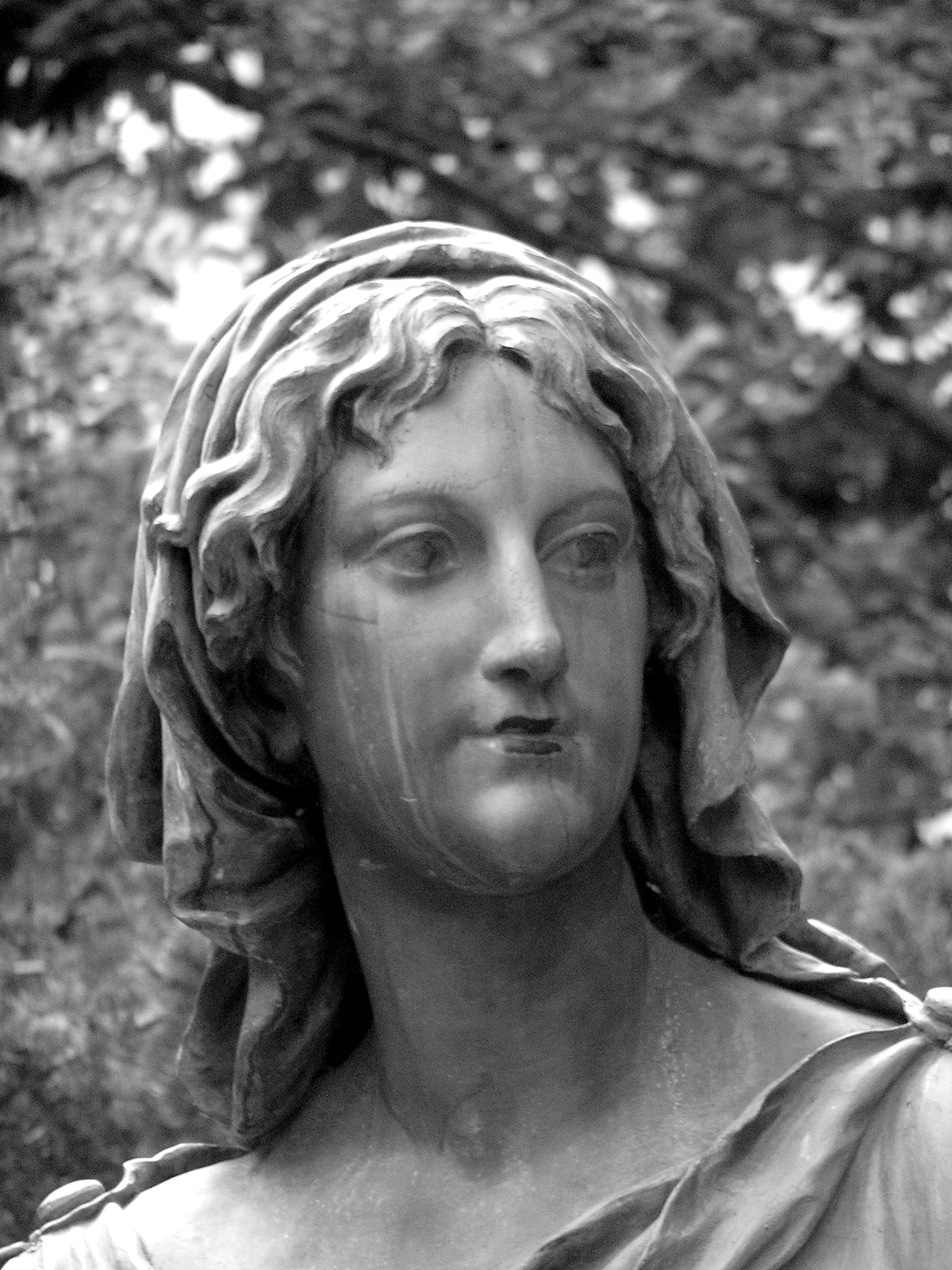
Personification of Tolerance, a statue displayed in Lužánky park in Brno, Czech Republic

One of the earliest formulations of the "paradox of tolerance" is given in the notes of Karl Popper's The Open Society and Its Enemies in 1945. Popper raises the paradox in the chapter notes regarding "The Principle of Leadership", connecting the paradox to his refutation of Plato's defense of "benevolent despotism". In the main text, Popper addresses Plato's similar "paradox of freedom": Plato points out the contradiction inherent in unchecked freedom, as it implies the freedom to act to limit the freedom of others. Plato argues that true democracy inevitably leads to tyranny, and suggests that the rule of an enlightened "philosopher-king" (cf. Noocracy) is preferable to the tyranny of majority rule.

Popper rejects Plato's argument, in part because he argues that there are no readily available "enlightened philosopher-kings" prepared to adopt this role, and advocates for the institutions of liberal democracies as an alternative. In the corresponding chapter notes, Popper defines the paradox of tolerance and makes a similar argument. Of both tolerance and freedom, Popper argues for the necessity of limiting unchecked freedom and intolerance in order to prevent despotic rule rather than to embrace it.

There are earlier examples of the discourse on tolerance and its limits. In 1801, Thomas Jefferson addressed the notion of a tolerant society in his first inaugural speech as President of the United States. Concerning those who might destabilize the United States and its unity, Jefferson stated: "let them stand undisturbed as monuments of the safety with which error of opinion may be tolerated where reason is left free to combat it."

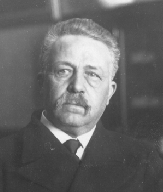
Gaetano Mosca, leading proponent of early elite theory

Gaetano Mosca, a political theorist, is also often quoted: "[i]f tolerance is taken to the point where it tolerates the destruction of those same principles that made tolerance possible in the first place, it becomes intolerable."

Either way, philosopher John Rawls concludes differently in his 1971 A Theory of Justice, stating that a just society must tolerate the intolerant, for otherwise, the society would then itself be intolerant, and thus unjust. However, Rawls qualifies this assertion, conceding that under extraordinary circumstances, if constitutional safeguards do not suffice to ensure the security of the tolerant and the institutions of liberty, a tolerant society has a reasonable right to self-preservation to act against intolerance if it would limit the liberty of others under a just constitution. Rawls emphasizes that the liberties of the intolerant should be constrained only insofar as they demonstrably affect the liberties of others: "While an intolerant sect does not itself have title to complain of intolerance, its freedom should be restricted only when the tolerant sincerely and with reason believe that their own security and that of the institutions of liberty are in danger."

In On Toleration (1997), Michael Walzer asked, "Should we tolerate the intolerant?" He claims that most minority religious groups who are the beneficiaries of tolerance are themselves intolerant, at least in some respects. In a tolerant regime, such (intolerant) people may learn to tolerate, or at least to behave "as if they possessed this virtue".

=== Repressive tolerance ===
A distinct but related critique of tolerance was advanced by Herbert Marcuse in his 1965 essay "Repressive Tolerance", published in A Critique of Pure Tolerance. Marcuse argued that in an oppressive society, tolerance is often a tool of the powerful, allowing the status quo to persist unchallenged while suppressing genuine dissent. He contended that so-called "pure tolerance" masks the fact that the dominant class already controls public discourse, and that this tolerance can be "repressive" because it tolerates injustices under the guise of pluralism. Marcuse proposed a "liberating tolerance" which would be intolerant of right-wing movements and policies that sustain oppression, and would instead practice selective intolerance toward regressive ideas. While Marcuse's argument is not identical to Popper's paradox, it reinforces the notion that tolerance can be self-defeating if it protects forces that seek to destroy the very conditions of liberation.

== Exact formulations ==
Preston King describes tolerance as occurring when one objects to but voluntarily endures certain acts, ideas, organisations and identities. This involves two components:

1. An objection component, wherein an agent objects to an item. For instance, a follower of one faith may assert the beliefs of another faith are wrong. If this objection component is absent, the agent is not tolerant but simply indifferent.
2. An acceptance component, which does not resolve the objection but instead offers positive reasons for overlooking it, e.g., social harmony. This acceptance must be voluntary — enduring an oppressive government, for example, is not an instance of tolerance because it is not voluntary, as the person enduring such a government has no choice but to accept this state of affairs.

Deciding whether to tolerate an item involves a balancing of reasons, for example when we weigh the reasons for rejecting an idea we find problematic against the benefit of accepting it in the name of social harmony, and it is in this balancing of reasons that the paradox of tolerance arises. Most formulations of tolerance assert that tolerance is a reciprocal act, and the intolerant need not be tolerated. This necessitates drawing a limit between the tolerant and intolerant in every implementation of tolerance, which suggests that any act of tolerance requires an act of intolerance.

== Proposed solutions ==
Philosopher Rainer Forst resolves the contradiction in philosophical terms by outlining tolerance as a social norm and distinguishing between two notions of "intolerance": the denial of tolerance as a social norm, and the rejection of this denial.

Other solutions to the paradox of intolerance frame it in more practical terms, a solution favored by philosophers such as Karl Popper. Popper underlines the importance of rational argument, drawing attention to the fact that many intolerant philosophies reject rational argument and thus prevent calls for tolerance from being received on equal terms:

Less well known [than other paradoxes] is the paradox of tolerance: Unlimited tolerance must lead to the disappearance of tolerance. If we extend unlimited tolerance even to those who are intolerant, if we are not prepared to defend a tolerant society against the onslaught of the intolerant, then the tolerant will be destroyed, and tolerance with them. In this formulation, I do not imply, for instance, that we should always suppress the utterance of intolerant philosophies; as long as we can counter them by rational argument and keep them in check by public opinion, suppression would certainly be most unwise. But we should claim the right to suppress them if necessary even by force; for it may easily turn out that they are not prepared to meet us on the level of rational argument, but begin by denouncing all argument; they may forbid their followers to listen to rational argument, because it is deceptive, and teach them to answer arguments by the use of their fists or pistols. We should therefore claim, in the name of tolerance, the right not to tolerate the intolerant. We should claim that any movement preaching intolerance places itself outside the law and we should consider incitement to intolerance and persecution as criminal, in the same way as we should consider incitement to murder, or to kidnapping, or to the revival of the slave trade, as criminal.

Popper also draws attention to the fact that intolerance is often asserted through the use of violence, drawing on a point re-iterated by philosophers such as John Rawls. In A Theory of Justice, Rawls asserts that a society must tolerate the intolerant in order to be a just society, but qualifies this assertion by stating that exceptional circumstances may call for society to exercise its right to self-preservation against acts of intolerance that threaten the liberty and security of the tolerant. Such formulations address the inherent moral contradiction that arises from the assumption that the moral virtue of tolerance is at odds with the toleration of moral wrongs, which can be resolved by grounding toleration within limits defined by a higher moral order.

Another solution is to place tolerance in the context of social contract theory: to wit, tolerance should not be considered a virtue or moral principle, but rather an unspoken agreement within society to tolerate one another's differences as long as no harm to others arises from same. In this formulation, one being intolerant is violating the contract, and therefore is no longer protected by it against the rest of society. Approaches in a defensive democracy which ban intolerant or extremist behavior are often ineffective against a strategy of a façade, which does not meet the legal criteria for a ban.

=== Legal implementations in democratic states ===
Several post-war European democracies have translated the paradox of tolerance into legal doctrines. The German Basic Law embodies the concept of "Streitbare Demokratie" (defensive democracy) which permits the restriction of fundamental rights of those who abuse them to fight the democratic order. Article 18 allows the forfeiture of rights such as freedom of expression, assembly, and association if they are used to combat the liberal democratic foundation. Furthermore, Article 21(2) empowers the Federal Constitutional Court to ban political parties that seek to undermine or abolish the free democratic basic order. Similar constitutional provisions exist in many other European countries, often referred to as "militant democracy". This approach directly confronts the paradox by denying the tools of democracy to those who would use them to establish a dictatorship.

== Tolerance and freedom of speech ==
The paradox of tolerance is meaningful in the discussion of what, if any, boundaries are to be set on freedom of speech. In The Boundaries of Liberty and Tolerance: The Struggle Against Kahanism in Israel (1994), Raphael Cohen-Almagor asserts that to afford freedom of speech to those who would use it to eliminate the very principle upon which that freedom relies is paradoxical. Michel Rosenfeld, in the Harvard Law Review in 1987, stated: "it seems contradictory to extend freedom of speech to extremists who ... if successful, ruthlessly suppress the speech of those with whom they disagree."

=== United States versus European approaches ===
Rosenfeld contrasts the approach to hate speech between Western European democracies and the United States, pointing out that among Western European nations, extremely intolerant or fringe political materials (e.g., Holocaust denial) are characterized as inherently socially disruptive, and are subject to legal constraints on their circulation as such, while the US has ruled that such materials are protected by the principles of freedom of speech and press in the First Amendment to the US Constitution, and cannot be restricted except when incitement to violence or other illegal activities is made explicit.

This transatlantic difference reflects competing responses to the paradox. The European position is that tolerating intolerant speech can embolden extremists and lead to real-world harm, necessitating preventive legal measures. The American position, rooted in the First Amendment absolutism often associated with Oliver Wendell Holmes Jr.'s marketplace of ideas concept, holds that the best remedy for bad speech is more speech, not censorship. Critics of the American model argue that it fails to address the paradox because intolerant movements can capture the public sphere and manipulate democratic processes without directly inciting violence. Proponents counter that suppressing intolerant speech can set a dangerous precedent that might be turned against dissidents.

Criticism of violent intolerance as a response to intolerant speech is characteristic of discourse ethics as developed by Jürgen Habermas and Karl-Otto Apel.

== Homophily and intolerance ==
A relationship between intolerance and homophily, a preference for interacting with those with similar traits, appears when a tolerant person's relationship with an intolerant member of an in-group is strained by the tolerant person's relationship with a member of an out-group that is the subject of this intolerance. An intolerant person would disapprove this person's positive relationship with a member of the out-group. If this view is generally supported by the social norms of the in-group, a tolerant person risks being ostracized because of their toleration. If they succumb to social pressure, they may be rewarded for adopting an intolerant attitude.

This dilemma has been considered by Fernando Aguiar and Antonio Parravano in "Tolerating the Intolerant: Homophily, Intolerance, and Segregation in Social Balanced Networks" (2013), modeling a community of individuals whose relationships are governed by a modified form of the Heider balance theory.

== Paradox of freedom and paradox of democracy ==
In the same work in which Popper elucidates the paradox of tolerance, he brings up two closely related concepts, the "paradox of democracy" and the "paradox of freedom". In the paradox of democracy, he points out the possibility that a democratic majority could vote for a tyrant to rule, thus ending democracy. In the "paradox of freedom", he instead points out that unlimited freedom would "make the bully free to enslave the meek", thus reducing freedom.

In their 2022 book, Paradox of Democracy, Zac Gershberg and Sean Illing argue that the accessibility of communications media potentiates the paradox of democracy. They write "the essential democratic freedom – freedom of expression – is both ingrained in and potentially harmful to democracy." They draw from historical examples such as isegoria (equal access to the civic discourse) in ancient Athens and the development of book publishing in Europe.

== Criticisms ==
Some thinkers argue that the paradox of tolerance is not a genuine paradox or that the solution of suppressing intolerance is more dangerous than the problem it seeks to solve. Libertarian philosophers, for instance, maintain that the state should remain neutral and never restrict speech based on its content. They argue that once the government has the power to suppress "intolerant" views, that power can be abused to silence legitimate political dissent. In this view, the true threat is not the intolerant minority, but the granting of discretionary censorship powers to authorities.

Another criticism comes from critical race theory scholars and some left-wing commentators who caution that the label "intolerant" is often selectively applied by those in power to marginalize dissent. The invocation of Popper's paradox, they argue, can become a pretext for suppressing the speech of minority groups whose protests are branded as extremist or divisive. Thus, the paradox of tolerance can be used to defend an unjust status quo by framing challenges to it as forms of "intolerance" that must not be tolerated.

There is also a practical criticism: historically, attempts to ban intolerant speech have often backfired, either by driving extremism underground and creating martyrs, or by being inconsistently applied. The Weimar Republic's inability to defend itself against the Nazis is sometimes cited as a failure to apply a militant democracy, yet Nazi propaganda also exploited the status of a banned movement to gain sympathy. The effectiveness of legal bans remains contested.

== Modern applications ==
The paradox of tolerance has become a touchstone in debates about platform governance on social media. Companies such as Meta and Twitter have faced criticism both for allowing hate speech and extremist content, and for suppressing certain political views. The paradox helps frame the dilemma: an unmoderated platform may give intolerant voices a megaphone, while heavy moderation can be accused of stifling legitimate expression. Content moderation policies often attempt to distinguish between harmful intolerance and protected speech, but the line is contested.

The concept is also invoked in discussions about the inclusion of extremist political parties in democratic processes. Some European countries have banned neo-Nazi parties or outlawed the display of certain symbols, while others rely on public discourse to marginalize extremists. The varying success of these approaches fuels ongoing debate over the right balance between tolerance and self-preservation.

== See also ==
- A Critique of Pure Tolerance
- Communist Party of Germany v. the Federal Republic of Germany
- Suicidal empathy
- Paradox of freedom
- Paradox of democracy
- Militant democracy
