= Involvement of AIPAC in the 2026 U.S. elections =

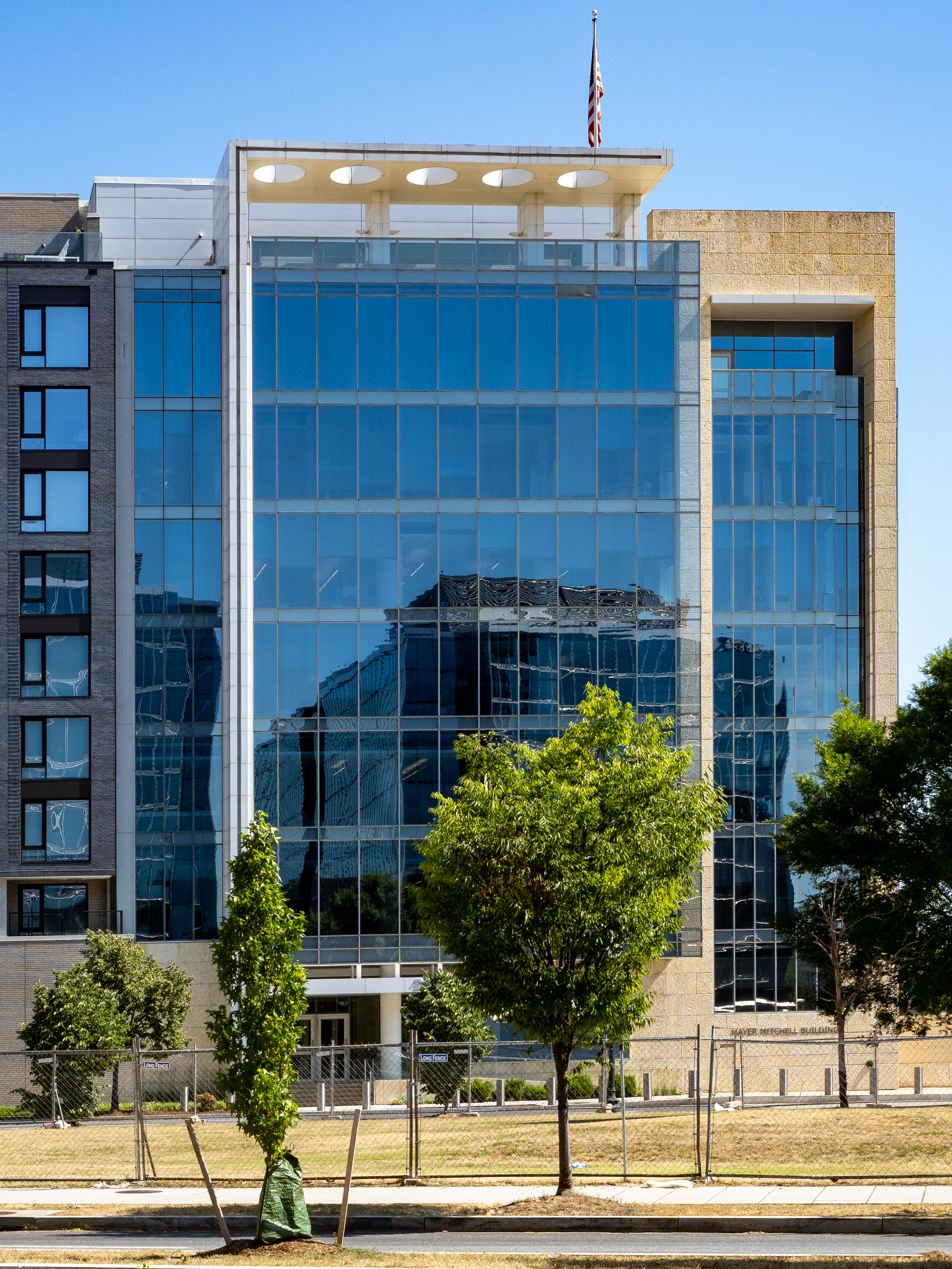
AIPAC headquarters in Mount Vernon Triangle, Washington, D.C.

In the lead-up to the 2026 United States elections, AIPAC – a pro-Israel group – lobbied for legislators who promoted policies aimed at reinforcing Israel–United States relations. The online project "Track AIPAC" shows an about eightfold rise compared to two years prior. Before the 2024 elections, AIPAC backed 12 Democratic candidates.

As American voters have grown more critical of Israel, especially following the genocide in Gaza, numerous Democratic candidates in the 2026 elections took a firmer position against the policies of Israeli prime minister Benjamin Netanyahu. Israel’s bombardment of Gaza has reshaped Democratic politics, triggering a backlash—particularly among younger voters—and deepening the generational divide within the party.

== Background ==
In less than five years since entering U.S. political campaigning, the American Israel Public Affairs Committee (AIPAC) has become one of the most well-funded participants in the midterm elections. It has also turned into one of the most contentious and polarizing forces in the political arena. The organization itself has increasingly become a central focus in election campaigns. This summer, New York City Council member Zohran Mamdani described AIPAC as part of a "monstrous" group that, in his opinion, holds too much influence in American politics. The group’s leaders remain committed to their strategy, describing their mission as a "long game" aimed at electing a Congress that will help address what they see as existential threats to Israel from Iran and other adversarial countries. Despite mounting public criticism of both AIPAC and Israel, the organization has successfully raised tens of millions of dollars, which it uses to support particular candidates running for the House of Representatives and the Senate.

Founded in the 1950s, AIPAC is regarded as one of the most powerful lobbying groups in Washington’s foreign policy arena. The organization invests millions of dollars in political campaigns to promote stronger U.S.-Israel ties, back military assistance to Israel, enforce sanctions on Iran, and push for U.S. laws it considers vital to Israel’s security.

The idea that the pro-Israel lobby controls events has long been favored by conspiracy theorists. This notion gained traction in 2007 when John Mearsheimer and Stephen Walt released “The Israel Lobby and U.S. Foreign Policy,” which gave a weak argument the appearance of academic credibility. Almost twenty years later, Eli Clifton and Ian Lustick continue this line of thought in “Israel’s Lobby: America in the Grip of a Foreign Power.” Clifton, a co-founder of the Quincy Institute for Responsible Statecraft, and Lustick, an emeritus professor of political science at the University of Pennsylvania, express much stronger hostility than Mearsheimer and Walt did.

== Supports in 2026 elections ==
Two organizations that challenge AIPAC—" Track AIPAC," which tracks the group's political expenditures, and " Justice Democrats," a progressive political action committee—have supported more than 100 Democratic candidates. These candidates have committed to refusing donations from pro-Israel organizations (including AIPAC) and to opposing U.S. military aid to Israel. Frank Lowenstein, who served as a special envoy for Israeli-Palestinian talks under Democratic President Barack Obama, says: "Given recent events, a significant share of AIPAC’s funding will probably now be directed toward Republican candidates."

A Reuters analysis of candidates' answers to election surveys found that 73 out of 102 candidates endorsed by groups opposing AIPAC are running against current Democratic members of Congress. Erin Sousa, a spokesperson for AIPAC, said the organization "takes pride in backing the Democratic mainstream by working to block fringe, far-left, anti-Israel candidates from gaining seats in Congress." She also mentioned that "AIPAC and our millions of Democratic supporters will continue to be active during this election season and beyond to help elect candidates who advocate for a strong U.S.-Israel relationship."

More Democratic primary challengers have made opposing the American Israel Public Affairs Committee (AIPAC) a key focus of their campaigns. Their goal is to defeat incumbent Democratic lawmakers who have the support of this powerful pro-Israel lobbying organization. This development underscores divisions over U.S. policy toward Israel—divisions that have been intensified by the conflicts in Gaza and rising tensions with Iran, especially as the November midterm elections near. This dynamic may also hinder Democratic attempts to take advantage of Republican weaknesses, such as high living costs or possible public opposition to a war involving the U.S. and Israel against Iran.

Mike Rogers, the Republican Senate candidate from Michigan, has asked AIPAC—the pro-Israel lobby—not to run a campaign on his behalf in the upcoming midterm elections. He is concerned that, given the growing criticism of Israel from across the political spectrum and the mounting challenges surrounding U.S. support for Israel, the lobby’s backing could prove counterproductive. AIPAC has focused its efforts on Democratic primaries in liberal districts, spending over $6 million on behalf of Melissa Hernandez; despite this significant investment, she was defeated by the frontrunner, Aisha Wahab. In the Michigan Senate primary, AIPAC spent more than $30 million to support Haley Stevens, but Abdul El-Sayed emerged victorious..

=== Haley Stevens ===
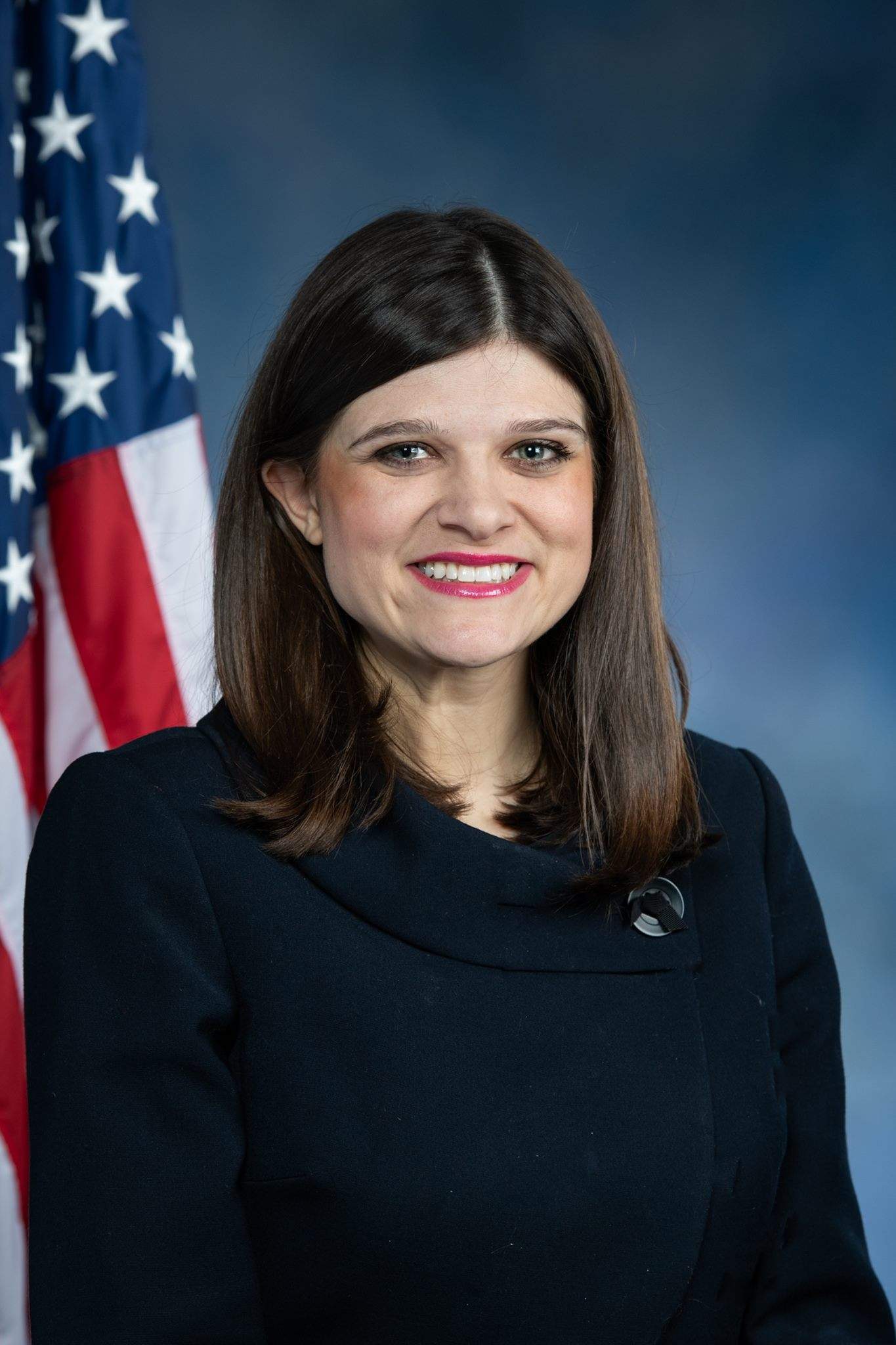
Haley Stevens, 2018

The American Israel Public Affairs Committee (AIPAC) and its related organizations have invested close to $30 million to back Haley Stevens, a Democratic candidate from Michigan. Stevens has mostly steered clear of addressing the group directly. At a campaign event in western Michigan in July, she was asked about AIPAC on two occasions; in response, she spoke for more than 800 words without mentioning the organization even once. She referred to Israel only once, saying she "wants to see the United States and Israel collaborate to rebuild Gaza."

Former Congressman Andy Levin, who was defeated by Stevens in the 2022 Democratic primary after redistricting, commented, "AIPAC never supports AIPAC. They don't even discuss Israel and Palestine." AIPAC invested millions to campaign against Levin, who is Jewish. "As a voter seeing a million ads, you have no way of knowing who funded them."

US Senator Bernie Sanders revealed that the American Israel Public Affairs Committee (AIPAC) intends to allocate $233 million to defeat candidates in this fall’s congressional midterm elections who oppose the government of Israeli Prime Minister Benjamin Netanyahu. He noted, "They spent $33 million trying to defeat Abdul El-Sayed in the Michigan primary, but they were unsuccessful. And they will keep failing." Abdul El-Sayed, a Democratic candidate in Michigan’s elections this year, strongly opposes unconditional US military aid to Israel and has criticized Netanyahu’s government policies concerning Gaza and the occupied West Bank.

== Supports in 2024 elections ==
This tension persisted into 2024. In the Michigan Senate race, Democratic activists pressured the incumbent, Elissa Slotkin, to adopt a tougher stance regarding Israel’s war in Gaza. Slotkin, who is Jewish, had distanced herself from AIPAC years earlier. She ultimately defeated the Republican candidate, Mike Rogers, by fewer than 20,000 votes. Rogers is running for the Senate again this year and faces no opposition in the Republican primary.

== Some reports ==
A March survey conducted by the nonpartisan Pew Research Center found that about 80 percent of Democratic voters and Democratic-leaning independents have a negative opinion of Israel. According to an analysis of Federal Election Commission financial reports by OpenSecrets, a nonpartisan organization that monitors political funding, AIPAC and its backers have donated roughly $25 million to Democratic congressional candidates and more than $16 million to Republicans in the lead-up to the 2024 elections.
