= Censorship in the Federal Republic of Germany =

The Federal Republic of Germany guarantees freedom of speech, expression, and opinion to its citizens as per Article 5 of the constitution. Despite this, censorship of various materials has taken place since the Allied occupation after World War II and continues to take place in Germany in various forms due to a limiting provision in Article 5, Paragraph 2 of the constitution. In 2014 the Reporters Without Borders Press Freedom Index ranked Germany as 14th (out of 180 countries) in the world in terms of press freedom (United States at #46 for comparison). During the Allied occupation of Germany, the media was controlled by the occupying forces. The policy rationales differed among the occupying powers, but there was resentment in literary and journalistic circles in many parts of the country. Undesired publishing efforts were unilaterally blocked by the occupying forces.

Since the publication of the German Grundgesetz, there have been two kinds of censored media in Germany. The first is material that is considered offensive or indecent; such media are placed on the "Index" and restricted in their publication, and distribution to minors is illegal. The second is material that is considered anti-constitutional, dangerous to the state. The underlying concept is "streitbare Demokratie" (self-defending democracy) that legally hinders the rise of all anti-constitutional and thus undemocratic movements. The media concerned are banned outright, with criminal penalties for infringements. An example is the outright ban on material which supports National Socialism.

== Allied occupation ==
During Allied occupation of West Germany in the years following World War II, all printing was subject to Allied approval. Although no formal censorship process was in place, the Allies—particularly the Americans—carefully monitored emerging literature for content they considered harmful. Sympathy with the Nazi cause and criticism of the occupation were considered worthy of censorship. (See Denazification)

The U.S. Army took control of German media. The Information Control Division of the U.S. Army had by July 1946 taken control of 37 German newspapers, 6 radio stations, 314 theaters, 642 cinemas, 101 magazines, 237 book publishers, and 7,384 book dealers and printers. Its main mission was democratization but the agenda also included the prohibition on any criticism of the Allied occupation forces. In addition, on May 13, 1946 the Allied Control council issued a directive for the confiscation of all media that could contribute to Nazism or militarism. As a consequence a list was drawn up of over 30,000 book titles, ranging from school textbooks to poetry, which were now banned. All copies of books on the list were confiscated and destroyed; the possession of a book on the list was made a punishable offense. All the millions of copies of these books were to be confiscated and destroyed. The representative of the Military Directorate admitted that the order was in principle no different from the Nazi book burnings.

The censorship in the U.S. zone was regulated by the occupation directive JCS 1067 (valid until July 1947) and in the May 1946 order valid for all zones (rescinded in 1950), Allied Control Authority Order No. 4, "No. 4 - Confiscation of Literature and Material of a Nazi and Militarist Nature". All confiscated literature was reduced to pulp instead of burning. It was also directed by Directive No. 30, "Liquidation of German Military and Nazi Memorials and Museums." An exception was made for tombstones "erected at the places where members of regular formations died on the field of battle."

As regards art, in the U.S. zone it was just as censored as all other media; "all collections of works of art related or dedicated to the perpetuation of German militarism or Nazism will be closed permanently and taken into custody.". The directives were very broadly interpreted, leading to the destruction of thousands of paintings and thousands more were shipped to deposits in the U.S. Those confiscated paintings still surviving in U.S. custody include for example a painting "depicting a couple of middle aged women talking in a sunlit street in a small town"Cultural Policy Program Artists were also restricted in which new art they were allowed to create; "OMGUS was setting explicit political limits on art and representation".Cultural Policy Program

The publication Der Ruf (The Call) was a popular literary magazine first published in 1945 by Alfred Andersch and edited by Hans Werner Richter. Der Ruf, also called Independent Pages of the New Generation, claimed to have the aim of educating the German people about democracy. In 1947 its publication was blocked by the American forces for being overly critical of occupational government. Richter attempted to print many of the controversial pieces in a volume entitled Der Skorpion (The Scorpion). The occupational government blocked publication of Der Skorpion before it began, saying that the volume was too "nihilistic".

Publication of Der Ruf resumed in 1948 under a new publisher, but Der Skorpion was blocked and not widely distributed. Unable to publish his works, Richter founded Group 47.

The Allied costs for occupation were charged to the German people. The newspaper that revealed that the charges included for example the cost for thirty thousand bras was banned by the occupation authorities for revealing this.

== Constitutional protections ==
In May 1949, the German Grundgesetz, the new constitution, was passed and control of West Germany passed officially into German hands. Freedom of expression is granted by Article 5, with certain limits:

1. Every person shall have the right freely to express and disseminate his opinions in speech, writing, and pictures and to inform himself without hindrance from generally accessible sources. Freedom of the press and freedom of reporting by means of broadcasts and films shall be guaranteed. There shall be no censorship.
2. These rights shall find their limits in the provisions of general laws, in provisions for the protection of young persons, and in the right to personal honor.
3. Art and scholarship, research, and teaching shall be free. The freedom of teaching shall not release any person from allegiance to the constitution.

== Main laws ==
The most important and sometimes controversial regulations limiting freedom of speech and freedom of the press can be found in the Criminal code:

- Insult is punishable under Section 185. Satire and similar forms of art enjoy more freedom but have to respect human dignity (Article 1 of the Basic law).
- Malicious Gossip and Defamation (Section 186 and 187). Utterances about facts (opposed to personal judgement) are allowed if they are true and can be proven. Yet journalists are free to investigate without evidence because they are justified by Safeguarding Legitimate Interests (Section 193).
- Hate speech or "incitement of popular hatred" (Volksverhetzung) may be punishable if against segments of the population and in a manner that is capable of disturbing the public peace (Section 130 Agitation of the People), including racist agitation and antisemitism.
- Holocaust denial is punishable according to Section 130 subsection 3.
- Dissemination of means of propaganda of unconstitutional organizations (Section 86).
- Use of symbols of unconstitutional organizations (Section 86a) such as the Swastika.
- Disparagement of
  - the federal president (Section 90).
  - the state and its symbols (Section 90a).
- Rewarding and approving crimes (Section 140).
- Casting false suspicion (Section 164).
- Blasphemy in the sense of Insulting of faiths, religious societies and organizations dedicated to a philosophy of life if they could disturb public peace (Section 166)
- Dissemination of pornographic writings (Section 184).
  - involving violence or animals (Section 184a).
  - involving minors (Section 184b & 184c).
- Dissemination of writings depicting cruel or otherwise inhumane acts of violence in a manner that is trivializing, glorifying or otherwise injuring human dignity (Section 131).

Outdoor assemblies need no permit, but (generally) prior announcement to authorities. Assemblies can be banned, on a case-by-case basis, at memorial sites or if they endanger public security or order. The right can be ruled forfeit if used to combat the liberal democratic order; parties and other organisations that are banned do not enjoy it. The Love Parade decision (1 BvQ 28/01 and 1 BvQ 30/01 of 12 July 2001) determined that for an assembly to be protected it must comply with the concept of a constituent assembly, or the so-called narrow concept of assembly whereby the participants in the assembly must pursue a common purpose that is in the common interest.

== Index of Harmful Materials ==
Provision 2 of Article 5 of the Basic Law enabled the creation of the Bundesprüfstelle für jugendgefährdende Medien, or the Federal Examination Department for Media Harmful to Young Persons. The Department is responsible for maintaining the Index of Harmful Materials. Materials on the Index are severely restricted in their sale and distribution: they cannot be sold by mail, and many materials can only be sold "under the counter". While their advertisement and marketing is censored in general, these publications themselves are not.

Items on the index include pornography, graphic media which glorify war and violence, materials considered to be anti-constitutional (such as the writings of the Red Army Faction), and material likely or intended to induce hate.

This has resulted in Germany being known for unnecessary censorship of video games and animation. In games like Soldier of Fortune, Half-Life, Team Fortress and Turok: Dinosaur Hunter characters were turned into robots while in Command and Conquer: Generals the portraits of the Generals which are photos of real actors were turned into robots and a suicide bombing unit was turned into a bomb on wheels. While others such as Grand Theft Auto has removed bleeding and removed other gameplay modes.

Material that is considered unconstitutional is also dealt with by the Bundesamt für Verfassungsschutz (Federal Office for the Protection of the Constitution) and may be brought to trial in court. The Verfassungsschutz often operates via "V-Männer" (colloq. shorthand for "Verbindungsmänner", lit. "connection men" - recruited members of unconstitutional groupings working under cover for the state) who keep track of and counter unconstitutional political movements and their projects. This concept of "streitbare Demokratie" (self-defending democracy) was developed as a late response especially to the rise of the NSDAP, but also KPD, that turned the democratic Weimar Republic into the Nazi regime.

== Anti-constitutional activity ==
German protections for freedom of ideas and expression are superseded by various provisions against "anti-constitutional" (verfassungsfeindlich) politics. In practice the ban on "anti-constitutional" politics targets two main categories, Nazism (including Neo-Nazism) and Communism. In the Annual Report on the Protection of the Constitution these categories are discussed in the main chapters on right-wing extremism and left-wing extremism, respectively. Additionally Scientology and some other groups are included as "anti-constitutional."

=== Communism ===
During the Cold War the main emphasis in the Federal Republic of Germany's struggle against "anti-constitutional" activities was placed on communist subversion; most importantly it led to the 1956 ban of the Communist Party of Germany as anti-constitutional, and the ban or surveillance of several other communist or far-left organizations. A number of far-left organizations and their publications are monitored by the Federal Office for Protection of the Constitution as "anti-constitutional." Furthermore the flag and other symbols of the German Democratic Republic with hammer and sickle were banned as anti-constitutional; in the Federal Republic of Germany the GDR flag was regarded as a secessionist flag.

=== National Socialism and Holocaust denial ===
==== National Socialist parties ====
National Socialism is banned outright in Germany as anti-constitutional; it is illegal to found or belong to a Nazi party. Any party considered to be National Socialist can be banned by the Bundesverfassungsgericht, Germany's highest court. Likewise, publications in support of such groups are automatically placed on the Index, and some may be banned altogether.

Materials which express sympathy with National Socialism, however, are a more complicated matter. Ordinarily the printing of these materials does not constitute membership of a National Socialist organization and is therefore allowed. These materials are almost always placed on the Index.

Criminal law also proscribes symbols that are strongly identified with the Nazi Party (such as the Swastika) or that are symbols used often by neo-Nazi successor organizations or racist organizations in general.

There is a debate about whether the German NPD is National Socialist and there have been attempts to ban it.

==== Mein Kampf ====
Printing and public distribution of Hitler's book Mein Kampf was not allowed by the copyright holder, the state of Bavaria, which acquired the copyright after Hitler's death in 1945 since it was the location of his official residence. The copyright expired at the end of 2015. Private ownership and trade is allowed so long as it does not "promote hatred or war". The lesser-known "Second Book" is legal to print and trade, but it appears on the Index.

==== Holocaust denial ====
Holocaust denial is a crime in Germany. § 130(3) of the StGB (German penal code) reads:

He who, publicly or in assembly, approves, denies, or trivializes genocide committed under the regime of National Socialism in a way that is suitable to disturb the public peace, is subject to imprisonment up to 5 years or a monetary fine.

Perpetrators of Holocaust denial can be tried in absentia and declared persona non grata, thus being barred from entering the country. Extradition treaties as relate to Holocaust denial are subject to political asylum pleas, but a persona non grata who enters Germany can be immediately arrested. Furthermore, a German arrest warrant based on the offense of Holocaust denial is deemed executable in many EU states, thus, a Holocaust denier's entry into any EU state could lead to arrest and extradition to Germany (or any other state where such denial is an offense, such as Austria, and which has issued an arrest warrant).

Among those who have been charged with Holocaust denial in Germany are the following:

- David Irving, who was declared persona non grata and has not returned to Germany;
- Germar Rudolf, who was sentenced to prison but fled jurisdiction; he was deported from the United States in 2005;
- Ernst Zündel, received a five-year prison sentence on February 15, 2007 in Germany,
- Fredrick Töben, an Australian citizen, who had an appointment with a German public prosecutor in Mannheim with whom he wanted to discuss Holocaust denial; at the end of the conversation with the prosecutor, Toben was presented an arrest warrant which the prosecutor had already obtained beforehand. A German court sentenced him to a prison sentence of ten months.

== See also ==
- Chilling effect
