= Almagor (surname) =

Almagor is a Hebrew surname. Notable people with the surname include

- Dan Almagor (born 1935), Israeli playwright
- Gila Almagor (born Gila Alexandrowitz; 1939), Israeli actress, film star, and author
- Raphael Cohen-Almagor, educator, researcher, and human rights activist
