= Larry Davidson =

Larry Davidson may refer to:

- Larry Davidson (basketball) (born 1983), Australian former basketball player
- Larry Davidson (tennis) (born 1955), American former tennis player

== See also ==
- Lawrence Davidson, professor of Middle East history
