= Rami Zeedan =

Israeli Druze political scientist

Rami Zeedan (Arabic: رامي زيدان, Hebrew: רמי זידאן) is an Israeli Druze political scientist and historian, currently an associate professor of Israel Studies at the University of Kansas (USA). Dr. Zeedan is the founding editor of the Druze Studies Journal (DSJ).

== Education and career ==
Zeedan studied at the University of Haifa in Israel, completing his PhD in 2013. Before joining the University of Kansas, he held positions at the WZB Berlin Social Science Center, New York University, the Leibniz-Zentrum Moderner Orient, Kinneret College, the Open University of Israel, and the University of California, Berkeley.

At Kansas, Zeedan is a faculty member of the Jewish Studies Program and is affiliated with the Center for Global and International Studies. He served on the board of the Association for Israel Studies (AIS) from 2015 to 2021 and served as the book review editor of the journal Israel Studies Review from 2021 to 2025. Zeedan was promoted to Associate Professor.

Dr. Zeedan is a leader in establishing the emerging field of Druze Studies. He is the editor-in-chief of the Druze Studies Journal (DSJ), organized the Druze Studies Symposium at KU in Fall 2023, and the Druze Conference in Fall 2025 at the University of Kansas.

He is an advocate for open-access scholarship. Rami Zeedan received the 2025 Shulenburger Award for Innovation and Advocacy in Scholarly Communication by KU Libraries. The selection committee mentioned his transformative contributions to open scholarship, including founding the open-access Druze Studies Journal, co-creating an open textbook with students about Israeli society, and revising KU’s Open Access Policy to promote inclusive, globally relevant research.

== Scholarship ==
Zeedan's work covers various aspects of the modern history and status of Arab citizens of Israel and the Druze in Israel.

His first book, "Battalion of Arab- the History of the Minorities’ Unit in the IDF from 1948 to 1956" was published in Hebrew by Modan in 2015. His second book, "The Arab-Palestinian Society in the Israeli Political System: Integration Versus Segregation in the Twenty-First Century", was published by Lexington Books in 2019.

== Selected publications ==
=== Books ===
- Zeedan, R. (2019). Arab-Palestinian Society in the Israeli Political System: Integration Versus Segregation in the Twenty-first Century. Rowman & Littlefield.
- Zeedan, R. (2015). Battalion of Arabs: The History of the Minorities in the IDF. [in Hebrew] Tel Aviv: Modan.

=== Articles ===
- Day, A., & Zeedan, R. (2025). Populism in Israel: Netanyahu and the strategic approach. Mediterranean Politics, 1-36.
- Zeedan, R. (2025). The Druze vote in Israel: between ideology, socioeconomic status, kinship, and the Nation-State Basic Law. Democratization, 1-21.
- Zeedan, R. (2024). Social Identity and Voting Behavior in a Deeply Divided Society: The Case of Israel. Societies, 14(9), 177.
- Hazran, Y., Reed, M. A., Schäbler, B., Timani, H. S., & Zeedan, R. (2024). The Status of Druze Studies and Launching the Druze Studies Journal (DSJ). Druze Studies Journal 1.
- Johnson, C., & Zeedan, R. (2024). Bibliography of Periodical Literature on the Druze in 2023. Druze Studies Journal 1.
- Zeedan, R., & Hogan, R. E. (2022). The Correlation between Budgets and Matriculation Exams: The Case of Jewish and Arab Schools in Israel. Education Sciences, 12(8), 545.
- Zeedan, R. (2022). Palestinians in Israel: New Scholarship on Politics and Religion. Bustan: The Middle East Book Review, 13(1), 20-33.
- Beeri, I., Zaidan, A., & Zeedan, R. (2021). Willingness to pay taxes through mutual trust: The effect of fairness, governability, tax-enforcement and outsourcing on local tax collection rates. Governance, 1–24.
- Zeedan, R., & Wilcoxson, J. (2021). Obama vs. Trump-Different Approaches to the Israeli-Palestinian Conflict: Win-Win vs. Win-Lose Methods and Pure Mediation vs. Power Mediation. The Arab World Geographer, 24(1), 1-24.
- Zeedan, R. and Luce, M. (2021). Druze Women and Gender in Druze Society: A Systematic literature review. Religions 12(12): 1111.
- Zeedan, R. (2020). Reconsidering the Druze Narrative in the Wake of the Basic Law: Israel as the Nation-State of the Jewish People. Israel Studies, 25(3), 153–166.
- Zeedan, R. (2019). The 2016 U.S. Presidential Elections: What Went Wrong in Pre-Election Polls? Demographics Help to Explain. J, 2, 84–101.
- Zeedan, R. “The Druze Community in Israel.” Oxford Bibliographies in “Jewish Studies.” Ed. Naomi Seidman. New York: Oxford University Press. 27 February 2019.
- Zeedan, R. (2019). The Role of Military Service in the Integration/Segregation of Muslims, Christians, and Druze within Israel.” Societies 9(1): 1
- Zeedan, R. (2018). Predicting the Vote in Kinship-Based Municipal Elections- the case of Arab localities in Israel. Journal of Muslim Minority Affairs, 38(1), pp. 87-102.
- Zeedan, R. (2017). Bigger, but not always Better: Size and Local Democracy in Israeli Amalgamated Local Governments. Journal of Urban Affairs, 39 (5), pp. 711-728.
- Zeedan, R., Vigoda-Gadot, E., & Ben-Artzi Y. (2017). “Causes of (and Solutions for?) Financial Crises in Local Governments: Insights from Local Arab Authorities in Israel”, Administration & Society, 49 (7), pp. 1065-1083. (Advance online publication 21 November 2014).
- Zeedan, R. (2013). “Israel’s 2003 Plan for Unification of Local Authorities”. Israel Affairs. 19:1: 170–190.
