= The Open Society and Its Enemies =

1945 book by Karl Popper

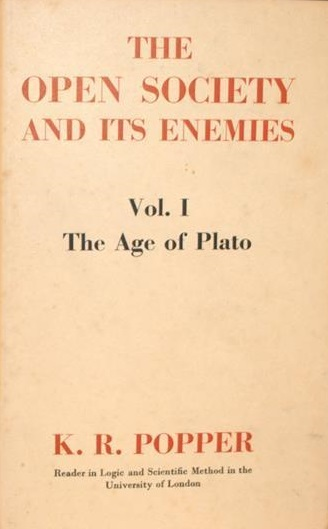
- Dust jacket of volume I of the first edition with the variant "The Age of Plato" instead of "The Spell of Plato"
- Author: Karl Popper
- Language: English
- Subject: Historicism
- Publisher: Routledge
- Publication date: 1945
- Publication place: United Kingdom
- Media type: Print (hardcover and paperback)
- Pages: 361 (1995 Routledge ed., vol. 1); 420 (1995 Routledge ed., vol. 2); 755 (1 volume 2013 Princeton ed.)
- ISBN: 978-0-691-15813-6 (1 volume 2013 Princeton ed.)

The Open Society and Its Enemies is a work on political philosophy by the philosopher Karl Popper, in which the author presents a defence of the open society against its enemies, and offers a critique of theories of teleological historicism, according to which history unfolds inexorably according to universal laws. Popper indicts Plato, Hegel, and Marx for relying on historicism to underpin their political philosophies.

Written during World War II, The Open Society and Its Enemies was published in 1945 in London by Routledge in two volumes: "The Spell of Plato" and "The High Tide of Prophecy: Hegel, Marx, and the Aftermath". A one-volume edition with a new introduction by Alan Ryan and an essay by E. H. Gombrich was published by Princeton University Press in 2013. The work was listed as one of the Modern Library Board's 100 Best Nonfiction books of the 20th century.

The book critiques historicism and defends the open society and liberal democracy. Popper argues that Plato's political philosophy has dangerous tendencies towards totalitarianism, contrary to the benign idyll portrayed by most interpreters. He praises Plato's analysis of social change but rejects his solutions, which he sees as driven by fear of change brought about by the rise of democracies, and as contrary to the humanitarian and democratic views of Socrates and other thinkers of the Athenian "Great Generation". Popper also criticizes Hegel, tracing his ideas to Aristotle and arguing that they were at the root of philosophical underpinnings of 20th century totalitarianism. He agrees with Schopenhauer's view that Hegel "was a flat-headed, insipid, nauseating, illiterate charlatan, who reached the pinnacle of audacity in scribbling together and dishing up the craziest mystifying nonsense." Popper criticizes Marx at length for his historicism, which he believes led him to overstate his case, and rejects his radical and revolutionary outlook. Popper advocates for direct liberal democracy as the only form of government that allows institutional improvements without violence and bloodshed.

== Summary ==
Popper's book is divided into two volumes, which were only published as one volume in more recent editions. The first volume, The Spell of Plato, focuses on Plato, and the second volume, The High Tide of Prophecy, focuses on Karl Marx.

=== Volume 1: The Spell of Plato ===
The first section, "The Myth of Origin and Destiny", contains chapters 1 through 3. The second section, "Plato's Descriptive Sociology", contains chapters 4 and 5. The third section, "Plato's Political Programme", contains chapters 6 through 9. The fourth and last section of the first volume, "The Background of Plato's Attack", only contains chapter 10. The volume is closed by an unnumbered section of "Addenda".

==== The Myth of Origin and Destiny ====
Chapter 1, "Historicism and the Myth of Destiny", describes the historicist approach to social sciences, which Popper considers to be a flawed method. Historicism is "the doctrine that history is controlled by specific historical or evolutionary laws whose discovery would enable us to prophesy the destiny of man." Popper argues that the historicist approach gives poor results, and he outlines a method that he believes would yield better results. He also discusses how historicism originated and became entrenched in our culture. Popper provides "the doctrine of the chosen people" as an example of historicism. The doctrine assumes that God has chosen one people to be the selected instrument of His will, and that this people will inherit the earth – the law of historical development is laid down by the will of God. Popper argues that "the doctrine of the chosen people" grew out of the tribal form of social life, and he notes that other forms of historicist theories may still retain an element of collectivism. Popper identifies the two most important modern versions of historicism as the historical philosophy of racialism or fascism on the right and the Marxian historical philosophy on the left. Both theories base their historical forecasts on an interpretation of history which leads to the discovery of a law of its development.

Chapter 2, "Heraclitus", focuses on the emergence of historicism in ancient Greece, specifically through the philosophy of Heraclitus. Heraclitus believed in the idea of universal change and hidden destiny enforced by punishment, and saw strife or war as the dynamic and creative principle of all change, especially in social life. His philosophy was inspired by his personal experiences of social and political disturbances, and his emphasis on the importance of social dynamics reflects this. Popper sees Heraclitus as a predecessor to Hegel.

Chapter 3, "Plato's Theory of Forms or Ideas", discusses the eponymous theory. It is longer than the first two chapters, and is divided by Popper into six parts. According to Popper, Plato's philosophy was heavily influenced by his experiences of political turmoil and instability, and he believed that moral degeneration leads to political degeneration. He strove to arrest this political change by establishing a state that does not degenerate or change, which he saw as the perfect state of the Golden Age. While Plato deviated from the tenets of historicism by believing in an ideal state that does not change, he shared with Heraclitus a tendency to shrink back from the last consequences of historicism.

This chapter introduces Popper's distinction between the social engineer and the historicist, of which he favors the former. The social engineer believes that humans can control history to achieve their goals, and sees politics as a tool to build and modify social institutions; he evaluates institutions based on their design, efficiency, and other practical factors. (Popper identifies two types of social engineering: piecemeal and utopian, which he further discusses in chapter nine.) In contrast, the historicist is interested in understanding the past, present, and future significance of institutions. They evaluate institutions based on their historical role, such as if they are divinely willed or serving important historical trends. Popper acknowledges that institutions are not simply machines and can have unique characteristics beyond their practical purpose.

This chapter also introduces Popper's distinction between two different methods of understanding things: methodological essentialism and methodological nominalism, of which he favors the latter. Methodological essentialism is the view that science should aim to uncover the hidden reality or essence of things through intellectual intuition and to describe it in words through definitions. Methodological nominalism, by contrast, emphasizes the importance of describing how things behave in different situations, and especially whether there are any regularities in their behavior. According to Popper, natural sciences mostly use methodological nominalism, while the social sciences still rely on essentialist methods, which is one of the reasons for their backwardness. Popper notes that some people argue that the difference in method between natural and social sciences reflects an essential difference between the two fields, but he disagrees with this view.

==== Plato's Descriptive Sociology ====
Chapter 4, "Change and Rest", describes Plato's sociology as based on the theory of Forms and universal flux and decay. It is long, and divided into five parts. According to Popper, Plato believed change can only lead towards imperfection and evil, which is a process of degeneration – he saw history as an illness, and set out a system of historical periods governed by a law of evolution. Plato's ideal state was not a progressive Utopian vision of the future, but rather a historical or even pre-historical one that attempted to reconstruct ancient tribal aristocracies to avoid class war. The ruling class in Plato's best state has an unchallengeable superiority and education. Breeding and training of the ruling class was necessary for ensuring stability, and Plato demanded the same principles be applied as in breeding dogs, horses, or birds. Popper summarizes Plato's systematic historicist sociology, which was an attempt to understand and interpret the changing social world.

Chapter 5, "Nature and Convention", introduces Popper's distinction between natural laws and normative laws. Popper divides stages of the development of this distinction throughout history, and then applies it to a further analysis of Plato. According to Popper, natural laws describe strict, unvarying regularities in nature, such as the laws of motion and gravity, while normative laws are rules that forbid or demand certain modes of conduct, such as the Ten Commandments. Normative laws can be enforced by people and are alterable, whereas natural laws are beyond human control and unalterable.

Popper believes that this distinction developed throughout history, starting from a naïve or magical monism, where there is no distinction made between natural and normative laws, and unpleasant experiences are the means by which people learn to adjust to their environment. Within this stage, there are two possibilities: naïve naturalism and naïve conventionalism. In the latter possibility, both natural and normative regularities are experienced as expressions of and dependent upon the decisions of man-like gods or demons. The breakdown of magical tribalism is connected to the realization that taboos are different in various tribes, that they are imposed and enforced by man, and that they may be broken without unpleasant repercussions if one can only escape the sanctions imposed by one's fellow-men. The development ends at what Popper calls critical dualism, which is the idea that norms and normative laws can be made and changed by humans, and cannot be derived from natural regularities or laws, although they are not necessarily arbitrary. This position was first reached by the Sophist Protagoras. It emphasizes that humans are morally responsible for norms, and should try to improve them if they are objectionable. It can also be described as a dualism of facts and decisions, meaning that decisions must be compatible with natural laws to be carried out, but they cannot be derived from those laws. Decisions can refer to a certain decision that has been made or the act of deciding itself.

According to Popper, there are three intermediate positions in this development from naïve monism to critical dualism, namely biological naturalism, ethical or juridical positivism, and psychological or spiritual naturalism, which combine elements of magical monism and critical dualism. Biological naturalism "is the theory that in spite of the fact that moral laws and the laws of states are arbitrary, there are some eternal unchanging laws of nature from which we can derive such norms." Popper argues that biological naturalism cannot be used to support ethical doctrines since it is impossible to base norms upon facts. Ethical positivism, on the other hand, believes that existing laws are the only possible standards of goodness and that norms are conventional. However, ethical positivism has often been conservative or authoritarian, invoking the authority of God. Popper argues that authoritarian or conservative principles are an expression of ethical nihilism, which is an extreme moral scepticism and a distrust of man and his possibilities. Psychological or spiritual naturalism is a combination of the two previous views, arguing that norms are a product of man and human society and, therefore, "an expression of the psychological or spiritual nature of man, and of the nature of human society." Popper says that this view was first formulated by Plato, and that although it is "plausible", it is "so wide and so vague that it may be used to defend anything".

Having laid down these distinctions, Popper uses the final parts of Chapter 5 to analyze Plato some more. Popper analyzes Plato's use of the term "nature" and its relationship with historicism. He also discusses Plato's view of the state as a super-organism, where the state is viewed as a unified whole and the individual citizen as an imperfect copy of the state. Plato's emphasis on oneness and wholeness is related to tribal collectivism, and he saw the individual as a means to serve the whole. Popper also discusses Plato's theory of degeneration in the state, where degeneration is a natural evolutionary law that causes decay in all generated things. Plato suggests that knowledge of breeding and the Platonic Number can prevent racial degeneration, but lacking a purely rational method, it will eventually occur. The basis of Plato's historicist sociology is racial degeneration, which "explains the origin of disunion in the ruling class, and with it, the origin of all historical development".

==== Plato's Political Programme ====
Chapter 6, "Totalitarian Justice", analyzes what Popper describes as the totalitarian nature of Plato's political philosophy, which he believes is based on historicism and on Plato's "sociological doctrines concerning the conditions for the stability of class rule", as well as the philosopher's idea of justice and the philosopher-king. Popper argues that Plato intentionally introduced confusion by claiming, "in the Republic, that justice meant inequality" and class hierarchy, whereas "in general usage" in his time, "it meant equality". Popper discusses equalitarianism, individualism, and collectivism, and how they relate to Plato's opposition to natural privileges for natural leaders; he concludes that Plato's anti-individualism is deeply rooted in the fundamental dualism of his philosophy, and is anti-humanitarian and anti-Christian. Chapter 6 introduces Popper's theory of the state, which he calls protectionism, in the special sense that the state's primary purpose should be "the protection of the citizens' freedom". Although he believes it to be a liberal theory, he distinguishes it from the "policy of strict non-intervention", a.k.a. laissez-faire, since he believes that "protection of freedom" may be conceived of quite broadly, and may encompass measures of state control in education, since those may protect the young "from a neglect which would make them unable to defend their freedom". He acknowledges, however, that "too much state control in educational matters is a fatal danger to freedom, since it must lead to indoctrination" – he believes that "the important and difficult question of the limitations of freedom cannot be solved by a cut and dried formula."

Chapter 7, "The Principle of Leadership", critiques Plato's idea "that the natural rulers should rule and the natural slaves should slave". He argues that political power is not unchecked, and using this argument, he replaces Plato's fundamental question of "Who should rule?" with "How can we so organize political institutions that bad or incompetent rulers can be prevented from doing too much damage?" He discusses the distinction between personalism and institutionalism in politics – he believes that the problems of the day are largely personal, while building the future must necessarily be institutional. Popper also discusses Socrates' moral intellectualism and its democratic and anti-democratic aspects, as well as Plato's institutional demands regarding the highest form of education. He argues that "the very idea of selecting or educating future leaders is self-contradictory", and that "the secret of intellectual excellence is the spirit of criticism".

Chapter 8, "The Philosopher King", analyses Plato's idea of the philosopher king and how it relates to totalitarianism. Plato's philosopher king is not necessarily a truth seeker but a ruler who must use lies and deceit for the benefit of the state. Popper argues that Plato's emphasis on breeding for the creation of a race of godlike men and women destined for kingship and mastery is an attempt to create a perfect society dominated by a class of rulers. Furthermore, Plato's philosophy was a practical political manifesto rather than a theoretical treatise, and his idea of the philosopher king was an ideal ruler and not just a theoretical construct. Popper suggests that Plato considered only a few individuals, including himself and some of his friends, as true philosophers eligible for the post of philosopher-king.

Chapter 9, "Aestheticism, Perfectionism, Utopianism", focuses on Popper's distinction between two approaches to social engineering: utopian engineering and piecemeal engineering, of which he favors the latter. Utopian engineering requires a blueprint of the ideal society, in rough outline at least, and determines practical action by considering the best means for realizing the ultimate political aim. In contrast, piecemeal engineering adopts "the method of searching for, and fighting against, the greatest and most urgent evils of society, rather than searching for, and fighting for, its greatest ultimate good." The piecemeal engineer aims to improve the current situation of society by gradually fighting against suffering, injustice, and war, and other such social evils whose existence can be established relatively easily. In contrast, utopian engineering is less likely to be supported by the approval and agreement of a great number of people, since it is difficult to judge a blueprint for social engineering on a grand scale. Indeed, since Utopian engineers, according to Popper, tend to deny "that there are rational methods to determine once and for all" what the ideal is, and what the best means of its realization are", it follows that "any difference of opinion between Utopian engineers must therefore lead, in the absence of rational methods, to the use of power instead of reason, i.e. to violence." Popper argues that the piecemeal approach, which involves small-scale social experiments, is more effective and realistic than the utopian approach, which is more liable to attempt "the reconstruction of society as a whole, i.e. very sweeping changes whose practical consequences are hard to calculate, owing to our limited experiences". Popper emphasizes the importance of gaining experience through trial and error, and compares social engineering to mechanical engineering. He contrasts his criticism of Platonic Idealism with Marx's criticism of utopianism, advocating for a piecemeal approach to learn and change our views as we act.

==== The Background of Plato's Attack ====
Chapter 10, titled "The Open Society and Its Enemies" like the book itself, examines Plato's belief in happiness as part of his political program and argues that Plato's treatment of happiness is "analogous to his treatment of justice", and similarly distorts general usage by tying the concept to class hierarchy. Popper believes that Plato's mission was to fight against social change and social dissension. The breakdown of the closed, tribal society, chiefly caused by the development of sea-communications and commerce, led to the partial dissolution of old ways of life, political revolutions and reactions, and the invention of critical discussion, which was free from magical obsessions. Athenian imperialism developed these two as its main characteristics. Popper discusses Thucydides' attitude towards democracy and Athens's empire, arguing that Thucydides was an anti-democrat who viewed Athens's empire as a form of tyranny. Popper defends Athens' imperial expansion by arguing that tribalist exclusiveness and self-sufficiency could only be superseded by some form of imperialism; he explains why some of the most thoughtful and gifted Athenians resisted the open society's attraction, and introduces the "Great Generation", the generation that lived in Athens just before and during the Peloponnesian War, which he considers a turning point in the history of mankind. Finally, he discusses Socrates' criticism of Athenian democracy and his belief in individualism, as well as what he considers Plato's betrayal of Socrates by implicating him in "his grandiose attempt to construct the theory of the arrested society". Plato's argument against democracy, as Popper interprets it, is based on the belief that the root of evil is "the 'Fall of Man', the breakdown of the closed society"; according to Popper, Plato "transfigured his hatred of individual initiative, and his wish to arrest all change, into a love of justice and temperance, of a heavenly state in which everybody is satisfied and happy and in which the crudity of money-grabbing is replaced by laws of generosity and friendship".

==== Addenda ====
A 1957 addendum to the first volume, "Plato and Geometry", discusses Popper's treatment of Plato's views on geometry. A 1961 addendum, titled "The Dating of the Theaetetus", discusses the dating of the Platonic dialogue by that name. A second 1961 addendum, titled "Reply to a Critic", makes an extended reply to various claims made in the book In Defense of Plato, by Ronald B. Levinson. A final addendum, added in 1965 and untitled (numbered "IV"), recommends the book Modern Dictatorship by Diana Spearman, in particular its chapter titled "The Theory of Autocracy".

=== Volume 2: The High Tide of Prophecy ===
Volume 2, subtitled The High Tide of Prophecy: Hegel, Marx and the Aftermath, extends Popper's critique of historicism from Plato to modern "prophets" of history, especially Hegel and Marx, and closes with a general discussion of rationalism, relativism and the meaning of history. Popper presents Hegelian and Marxist philosophies of history as major intellectual sources of modern totalitarian movements and contrasts them with his own defence of liberal democracy, institutional restraints on power and "piecemeal social engineering" in an open society.

==== The Rise of Oracular Philosophy ====
Chapter 11, "The Aristotelian Roots of Hegelianism", traces modern historicism back to Aristotle's essentialism and teleology. Popper argues that Aristotle's method of defining the fixed "essence" of things, together with his theory of the Best State and his defence of "natural" slavery, helped to found a tradition that treats social institutions as expressions of inherent natures and purposes rather than as alterable human constructions. He contrasts this "oracular" approach, which claims to read necessities out of the nature of things, with the provisional and operational use of definitions in modern science, where progress comes from bold conjectures and refutations rather than from uncovering essences.

Chapter 12, "Hegel and the New Tribalism", is a long polemic against Hegel, whom Popper presents as the chief modern source of historicism and as an influential apologist for Prussian state power. Popper portrays Hegel's dialectic and philosophy of identity as obscure devices that sanctify nationalism, statism and war, and argues that Hegel's glorification of the state helped prepare the ground for nineteenth- and twentieth-century forms of "tribalism", including German nationalism and later racist myths of "Blood and Soil".

==== Marx's Method ====
In the second section Popper turns to Marx, whom he regards as both a powerful critic of capitalism and a paradigmatic historicist prophet.

Chapter 13, "Marx's Sociological Determinism", reconstructs Marx's method as a form of sociological determinism which treats large-scale social change as governed by quasi-laws of historical development. Popper argues that Marx mistakenly believed that such laws could ground scientific predictions about the future of capitalism and the inevitable transition to socialism, and he criticises this kind of historicism as an inappropriate extension of the methods of the natural sciences to the open, highly complex system of social life.

Chapter 14, "The Autonomy of Sociology", develops Marx's criticisms of psychologism, the idea that all social laws can be reduced to psychological laws. Popper does this in the form of an extended argument against Mill's version of the idea, explaining at the end of the chapter that he did so because he considered Mill "a worthier opponent than Hegel", who was Marx's real target. He emphasizes the importance of the social environment and its institutions in explaining social phenomena. Popper critiques what he calls the conspiracy theory of society, which is "the view that an explanation of a social phenomenon consists in the discovery of the men or groups who are interested in the occurrence of this phenomenon (sometimes it is a hidden interest which has first to be revealed), and who have planned and conspired to bring it about." He argues that the main task of social sciences is to analyze the unintended social repercussions of intentional human actions. He concludes that psychological analysis should not be used to develop a standard of what is considered rational behavior in a particular situation, and that the problems of society are irreducible to those of human nature.

Chapter 15, "Economic Historicism", distinguishes Marx's own historical materialism from what Popper calls "vulgar Marxism". Popper argues that, for Marx, economic motives and class interests are symptoms of deeper institutional structures rather than the ultimate driving forces of history, and he treats Marx's "economism" – the claim that the economic organisation of society is fundamental for other social institutions – as an important but limited insight that should not be turned into a monocausal explanation or used as a basis for prophetic claims about the inevitable future of capitalism.

Chapter 16, "The Classes", examines Marx's claim that the history of all hitherto existing society is the history of class struggles. Popper interprets Marx's concept of class as an objective social situation which shapes interests and perspectives, but warns against the temptation to treat every political conflict as a simple struggle between exploiters and exploited or to elevate class struggle into a law of history. He considers Marx's attempt to deduce "class consciousness" from the logic of the class situation both illuminating and potentially dangerous when turned into sweeping historicist generalisations.

Chapter 17, "The Legal and the Social System", considers Marx's theory of the state as a superstructure resting on the economic "base". Popper concedes that economic power strongly influences political and legal institutions, but argues that political power is in turn relatively autonomous and can be used, through democratic reforms and economic intervention, to tame market forces and protect individual freedom. He concludes that economic interventionism and the institutional control of power within a democracy are preferable to revolutionary attempts at total social transformation.

==== Marx's Prophecy ====
The third section evaluates the content and failures of Marx's historical prophecies.

Chapter 18, "The Coming of Socialism", analyses Marx's argument that capitalism must collapse and give way to a classless socialist society. Popper reconstructs Marx's three-step argument from the concentration of capital, the growth of misery and the sharpening of class struggles to the inevitability of proletarian revolution, and contends that the conclusion does not follow from the premises and has been contradicted by the development of mixed economies and welfare states in liberal democracies.

Chapter 19, "The Social Revolution", criticises Marxist revolutionary strategy and its ambiguous attitude to political violence. Popper claims that treating violent revolution as historically inevitable, or as a morally privileged route to justice, is dangerous because it discourages gradual institutional reform and can be used to justify authoritarian movements that suppress democracy once in power; instead he urges that all political problems should be seen as institutional problems to be tackled by peaceful change.

Chapter 20, "Capitalism and Its Fate", discusses Marx's economic theories, including the labour theory of value, the tendency of the rate of profit to fall and the prediction of increasing pauperisation of the working class. Popper accepts that capitalism is prone to crises and that surplus labour can exert downward pressure on wages, but argues that trade unions, legal protections and political intervention can mitigate these tendencies and that Marx's law of "increasing misery" has been falsified by later developments in industrial societies.

Chapter 21, "An Evaluation of the Prophecy", offers an overall assessment of Marxism as a mixture of perceptive social analysis and mistaken historicist prophecy. Popper argues that Marx correctly anticipated the growing importance of large-scale industry, credit and productivity, and that his analysis of the trade cycle remains suggestive, but that his predictions about the immiseration of workers, the polarisation of classes and the inevitability of socialism have not been borne out.

==== Marx's Ethics ====
Chapter 22, "The Moral Theory of Historicism", examines the ethical assumptions behind Marx's critique of capitalism. Popper argues that Marx's condemnation of exploitation presupposes moral standards that cannot themselves be derived from historical laws, class interests or the direction of history. Against historicist moral relativism he defends a dualism of facts and decisions (or standards), holding that social conditions shape our values but do not determine them, and that individuals and societies remain responsible for choosing, criticising and revising moral aims.

==== The Aftermath ====
The fourth section considers some later philosophical and political consequences of historicism.

Chapter 23, "The Sociology of Knowledge", discusses historicist versions of the sociology of knowledge that treat scientific and moral beliefs as wholly determined by class position or historical situation. Popper criticises such views as self-defeating and argues instead that scientific objectivity is secured not by value-free observers but by the institutionalised practice of intersubjective criticism – the "friendly-hostile cooperation" of many scientists testing one another's ideas. He links this account to his broader defence of piecemeal social engineering and of institutional checks on power in an open society.

Chapter 24, "Oracular Philosophy and the Revolt against Reason", contrasts rationalism – understood as an attitude that appeals to argument and experience – with irrationalism, which glorifies will, passion or intuition. Popper defends "critical rationalism", the view that rational discussion itself rests on a non-rational decision to value reason, and criticises influential irrationalist philosophies which, in his view, encourage anti-egalitarian and authoritarian politics by disparaging argument and exalting charismatic leadership or historical destiny. This is opposed to 'uncritical or comprehensive rationalism', which "can be described as the attitude of the person who says 'I am not prepared to accept anything that cannot be defended by means of argument or experience'", including rationalism itself – which Popper believes is self-defeating.

==== Conclusion ====
Chapter 25, "Has History Any Meaning?", returns to the central theme of historicism. Popper argues that there are no discoverable laws that give history an inherent meaning or predetermined end, and that attempts to read such a meaning into history tend to legitimise the worship of power and the sacrifice of present individuals to imagined future goals. He suggests instead that human beings can give history "meaning" only by freely adopting and criticising aims – such as reducing avoidable suffering and protecting individual freedom – and by building institutions that embody those aims in an open society.

==== Addenda ====
Later editions of Volume 2 include two substantial addenda. The 1961 essay "Facts, Standards, and Truth: A Further Criticism of Relativism" develops Popper's defence of objective truth and his notion of verisimilitude (truthlikeness) against relativist and sceptical objections, arguing that although our knowledge is fallible, we can still speak meaningfully of getting closer to the truth and of creating, criticising and improving moral standards. A shorter 1965 "Note on Schwarzschild's Book on Marx" comments on Leopold Schwarzschild's biography The Red Prussian and records Popper's view that, had he known more of Marx's private correspondence, he would have portrayed Marx less sympathetically in his earlier chapters on Marx in The Open Society and Its Enemies.

=== Endnotes ===
The Open Society and its Enemies has extensive endnotes, which, together, are about as lengthy as the book's first volume. They are mostly bibliographical in nature, giving quotations from Plato and Marx that support the assertions made in the main body.

One endnote that became very popular was note 4 to chapter 7, since it defines the paradox of tolerance, the idea that "unlimited tolerance must lead to the disappearance of tolerance. If we extend unlimited tolerance even to those who are intolerant, if we are not prepared to defend a tolerant society against the onslaught of the intolerant, then the tolerant will be destroyed, and tolerance with them." This idea is not brought up at all in the main text of the book, which is much more concerned with the related paradox of freedom, "the argument that freedom in the sense of absence of any restraining control must lead to very great restraint, since it makes the bully free to enslave the meek". According to Popper, the paradox of freedom was "used first, and with success, by Plato", but was "never grasped" by Marx, who held the "naïve view that, in a classless society, state power would lose its function and 'wither away'". Popper begins note 4 to chapter 7 by defining the paradox of freedom and then, as an aside, further defines the paradox of tolerance and another paradox, called the paradox of democracy, "or more precisely, of majority-rule; i.e. the possibility that the majority may decide that a tyrant should rule."

== Publication history ==
As Popper wrote in academic obscurity in New Zealand during World War II, several colleagues in philosophy and the social sciences assisted with the book's path to publication. His friend E.H. Gombrich was entrusted with the task of finding a publisher; Lionel Robbins and Harold Laski reviewed the manuscript; J.N. Findlay suggested the book's title after three others had been discarded. ('A Social Philosophy for Everyman' was the original title of the manuscript; 'Three False Prophets: Plato-Hegel-Marx' and 'A Critique of Political Philosophy' were also considered and rejected.) Friedrich Hayek wanted to recruit Popper to the London School of Economics and was enthused by his turn to social philosophy.

=== History until publication, as told by Gombrich ===
Gombrich wrote down his "Personal Recollections" on the book's publication, and these were published in the 2013 Princeton one-volume edition. Gombrich explained that the manuscript was sent from New Zealand to England in the middle of World War II and took two-and-a-half years to publish. Gombrich kept a collection of letters, which he now shares, revealing that Popper saw his book as an "urgent" new philosophy of politics and history, trying to contribute to an understanding of the totalitarian revolt against civilization. Popper believed that the persistent hostility to the open society is due to the strain of civilization, as well as the sense of drift, which is associated with the transition from the closed tribal societies of the past to the individualistic civilization that originated in Athens in the fifth century BC. Gombrich received the manuscript and helped Popper send it to various publishers in England.

On August 19, 1943, Gombrich received a long letter from Karl Popper, which included a reply to the former's critical remarks on Popper's book "The Open Society and Its Enemies". Popper discussed the honesty of Schopenhauer and Hegel and argued that he is not biased by the fact that the democratic creed of the West is based on Christianity. Additionally, Popper shared his excitement about being offered a readership at the London School of Economics (LSE), thanks to the help of his friend, Hayek. Gombrich received instructions from Popper on how to apply for the position, along with Popper's CV and references. Popper also defended the length and complexity of his book, claiming that it achieves a rare degree of lucidity and simplicity despite being "thronged with thoughts on every single page".

In October 1944, Popper reported finishing two important articles on "Private and Public Values" and "The Refutation of Determinism," and intended to return to practical methodology and music after completing another article titled "The Logic of Freedom." Popper was still awaiting a publication date from Routledge and considering offers from universities in New Zealand and Australia. Gombrich also revealed that Popper's head of department at Canterbury had made derogatory comments about him, and Popper was eager to leave. Popper was ill during April, but his health improved while vacationing in the mountains. On May 21, while on a bus in New Zealand, he received a cable from Cambridge congratulating him on his London appointment and thanking him for an excellent article.

Despite the difficulties and worries that Karl Popper and his wife faced in traveling from New Zealand to England during World War II, including the prospect of meeting new people and the fear that their permits to enter Great Britain would be denied, they finally arrived in England and were greeted by Gombrich and his family. Gombrich gave Popper the first copy of his book "The Open Society and Its Enemies," which Popper eagerly scrutinized on the way to Gombrich's house. Gombrich's "Recollections" end on a reflective note, musing on the immense contributions that Popper made to intellectual discourse in the decades that followed.

=== History after publication ===
The book was not published in Russia until 1992. In 2019, the book was released in audiobook format for the first time, narrated by Liam Gerrard. The audiobook was produced by arrangement with the University of Klagenfurt/Karl Popper Library, by Tantor Media, a division of Recorded Books.

== Reception and influence ==
Popper's book remains one of the most popular defenses of Western liberal values in the post-World War II era. Gilbert Ryle, reviewing Popper's book just two years after its publication and agreeing with him, wrote that Plato "was Socrates' Judas." The Open Society and Its Enemies was praised by the philosophers Bertrand Russell, who called it "a work of first-class importance" and "a vigorous and profound defence of democracy", and Sidney Hook who called it a "subtly argued and passionately written" critique of the "historicist ideas that threaten the love of freedom [and] the existence of an open society". Hook calls Popper's critique of the cardinal beliefs of historicism "undoubtedly sound", noting that historicism "overlooks the presence of genuine alternatives in history, the operation of plural causal processes in the historical pattern, and the role of human ideals in redetermining the future". Nevertheless, Hook argues that Popper "reads Plato too literally when it serves his purposes and is too cocksure about what Plato's 'real' meaning is when the texts are ambiguous", and calls Popper's treatment of Hegel "downright abusive" and "demonstrably false", noting that "there is not a single reference to Hegel in Adolf Hitler's Mein Kampf", though neither does Popper refer to Hitler.

Some other philosophers were critical. Walter Kaufmann believed that Popper's work has many virtues, including its attack against totalitarianism, and many suggestive ideas. However, he also found it to have serious flaws, writing that Popper's interpretations of Plato were flawed and that Popper had provided a "comprehensive statement" of older myths about Hegel. Kaufmann commented that despite Popper's hatred of totalitarianism, Popper's method was "unfortunately similar to that of totalitarian 'scholars'".

In his The Open Philosophy and the Open Society: A Reply to Dr. Karl Popper's Refutations of Marxism (1968), the Marxist author Maurice Cornforth defended Marxism against Popper's criticisms. Though disagreeing with Popper, Cornforth nevertheless called him "perhaps the most eminent" critic of Marxism. The philosopher Robert C. Solomon writes that Popper directs an "almost wholly unjustified polemic" against Hegel, one which has helped to give Hegel a reputation as a "moral and political reactionary". The Marxist economist Ernest Mandel identifies The Open Society and Its Enemies as part of a literature, beginning with German social democrat Eduard Bernstein, that criticizes the dialectical method Marx borrowed from Hegel as "useless", "metaphysical", or "mystifying." He faults Popper and the other critics for their "positivist narrowness".

The political theorist Rajeev Bhargava argues that Popper "notoriously misreads Hegel and Marx", and that the formulation Popper deployed to defend liberal political values is "motivated by partisan ideological considerations grounded curiously in the most abstract metaphysical premises". In Jon Stewart's anthology The Hegel Myths and Legends (1996), The Open Society and Its Enemies is listed as a work that has propagated "myths" about Hegel. Stephen Houlgate writes that while Popper's accusation that Hegel sought to deceive others by use of dialectic is famous, it is also ignorant, as is Popper's charge that Hegel's account of sound and heat in the Encyclopedia of the Philosophical Sciences is "gibberish" although he does not elaborate further what specifically Hegel meant.

The Open Society Foundations, created by investor George Soros, were inspired in name and purpose by Popper's book.

The philosopher Joseph Agassi credits Popper with showing that historicism is a factor common to both fascism and Bolshevism.

== See also ==
- Criticism of democracy
- Horseshoe theory
- Paradox of voting
- Paradox of tolerance
