= Defensive democracy =

Prevention of anti-democratic principles

Defensive democracy, also frequently referred to as militant democracy (most notably in Germany), denotes the framework of laws, delegated legislation, and judicial rulings that restrict certain liberties within a democratic society to preserve the state, safeguard its constitutional institutions, and protect minority rights.

This principle navigates an inherent tension within modern democracies; the obligation to uphold core democratic ideals, such as freedom of association, elective rights and universal suffrage, balanced against the necessity of stopping anti-democratic factions from exploiting those exact liberties to dismantle the system.

Advocates view this framework as a necessary evil to the paradox of tolerance. While some democratic nations maintain unique societal or historical justifications for these defensive powers, the doctrine remains a subject of ongoing debate. Legal scholars and civil rights advocates frequently contest the exact threshold at which pre-emptive state interventions cross the line into authoritarianism and the excessive repression of civil liberties.

== Methods ==
The use of defensive democracy can be expressed via several actions applied to a person or group, such as:

- Surveillance by the security corps (especially military and police intelligence) of activists who are considered dangerous, or after entire associations outright;
- Restrictions on the freedom of movement or action over bodies suspected of endangering democracy;
- Restricting the rights of individuals and parties from running for elections through nomination rules (such as Meir Kahane, and subsequently the Kach party which he led, in Israel and Călin Georgescu in Romania);
- Outlawing of organizations considered a danger to democracy (such as Communist Party in West Germany);
- Redoing of elections as a last resort (such as the 2024 Romanian presidential election)

The frequency and extent of use of defensive democratic methods varies from country to country. The United States, for example, is considered a country that uses defensive democratic tactics frequently, especially after the September 11 attacks and the 2021 storming of the United States Capitol. As a rule, democratic countries try to not use the methods of defensive democracy too hastily or too severely, and seek alternative courses of action as much as possible, such as public information campaigns and condemnation of anti-democratic activates by respected public figures. Political bias in nomination rules or political party bans can contribute to political repression. However, there are situations where a state might recourse to defensive democratic methods (usually carried out by the court system or other authorities).

== Examples ==
=== Europe ===
Ten countries in Europe have outlawed Holocaust denial: France (Loi Gayssot), Belgium (Belgian Holocaust denial law), Switzerland (article 261bis of the Penal Code), Germany (§ 130 (3) of the penal code), Austria (article 3h Verbotsgesetz 1947), Romania, Slovakia, the Czech Republic (§ 405 of the Criminal Code), Lithuania, and Poland (article 55 of the law creating the Institute of National Remembrance 1998).

==== Germany ====
In German politics and constitutional law the concept exists under the term wehrhafte or streitbare Demokratie ("well-fortified", "battlesome", "defensive" or "militant democracy") which implies that the federal government (Bundesregierung), the parliament (Bundestag and Bundesrat) and the judiciary are given extensive powers and duties to defend the liberal democratic basic order (freiheitliche demokratische Grundordnung) against those who want to abolish it. The idea behind the concept is the notion that even a majority rule of the people cannot be allowed to install a totalitarian or autocratic regime, thereby violating the principles of the German constitution, the Basic Law for the Federal Republic of Germany. The German concept of defensive/militant democracy is a reaction to the experience of the Weimar Republic, whose liberal and democratic order was eliminated by the Nazi government – which came into office legally – and the Enabling Act of 1933. The lawyer and political scientist Karl Loewenstein who had emigrated from Germany to the United States in 1933, coined the term wehrhafte Demokratie as he was convinced that the Weimar Republic had not sufficiently defended its democracy against subversive elements that were attacking its foundations.

Several articles of the German constitution allow a range of different measures to "defend the liberal democratic basic order".

- Article 9 of the German Constitution allows for associations whose purpose or activity is directed against the constitutional order (verfassungsmäßige Ordnung) to be proscribed by the federal or state governments. The forced dissolution of an association is subject to legal review by administrative courts.
- The Federal Constitutional Court (Bundesverfassungsgericht) may declare political parties unconstitutional and dissolve them if their aims or the conduct of their supporters seek to impair or eliminate the liberal democratic basic order, according to Article 21 paragraph 2.
- According to Art. 18, the Federal Constitutional Court can restrict the fundamental rights of people who fight against the constitutional order. As of 2022, that has never happened in the history of the Federal Republic.
- According to Article 20 paragraph 4 of the Constitution, every German citizen has a right to resistance against anyone who wants to abolish the constitutional order, "if no other remedy is possible". However, this provision has never been applied in practice.

According to the Federal Civil Service Act (Bundesbeamtengesetz) and the Civil Servant Status Act (Beamtenstatusgesetz), every civil servant (Beamter, a category that also includes most school and university teachers) is required "to stand up for the liberal democratic basic order (...) at all times". When they take up their duties, they are therefore sworn to defend the constitutional order. Applicants who do not guarantee to stand up for the democratic order can be excluded from the civil service. This was particularly strict during the period of the Anti-Radical Decree from 1972 to 1985 (in some federal states until 1991), when all applicants were screened by the constitutional protection authorities. Over 1,000 prospective teachers and university lecturers were rejected as "enemies of the constitution" (Verfassungsfeinde) – in most cases due to their membership in far-left organisations – which amounted to a professional ban (Berufsverbot).

In addition, Germany maintains a domestic intelligence service, the Verfassungsschutz (consisting of a Federal Office and 16 State Offices for the Protection of the Constitution), one of whose main purposes is to investigate organisations whose activities are directed against the free democratic basic order (in particular far-right and far-left parties as well as Islamist extremists) – using both publicly accessible sources and undercover methods. The Federal Office for the Protection of the Constitution publishes an annual report with a list of organisations that it monitors for extremist tendencies. The organisations concerned can have their inclusion in this report reviewed by the courts.

=== Israel ===
Israel implemented the principle of defensive democracy, the Basic Law of the Knesset (Section 7A) which determined that "candidate lists would not participate in elections if its goals or actions, expressly or by implication, would deny the existence of the state of Israel as a Jewish state or deny the democratic character of the state of Israel."

Various political science researchers have perceived Israel as a democracy defending itself mainly from social and security constraints with which the state of Israel has been dealing since its creation. During the first three decades of its existence, most Arab countries did not recognize the state of Israel's existence as legitimate. Through the years, concerns have been raised from within the Jewish majority in Israel that the Arab minority within the country, who consider themselves part of the Arab world, would cooperate with the neighboring countries in their struggle against Israel. This situation has often raised the issue of a self-defensive democracy on the agenda in Israel.

During the 1980s, the issue was heavily discussed in a different context – for the first time in Israel's history, an extreme right-wing Jewish party (Kach), who rejected the state's democratic character and the rights of the Arab minority within the country, won representation to the Israeli parliament in the 1984 elections to the Knesset. As a result, in 1985, Israel's Knesset amended a basic law so that parties who engage in incitement to racism would be outlawed. Accordingly, the Supreme Court did not allow the Kach party to run again in the 1988 elections, on the basis that the party advocates racism.

=== Republic of Korea (South Korea) ===
Learning from legislation of West Germany, National Assembly of Second Republic inserted Defensive Democracy in their Constitution in 1960. Currently (as of 2022) in the Sixth Republic, it remains in the Constitution (§8(4) — esp. defensive democracy to prevent illegal parties) and has some procedures in other laws. The Constitutional Court of Korea is in charge of deciding if a party is illegal and therefore should be dissolved.

For the first time since the Constitutional Court of Korea was created, in November 2013, the Justice Ministry of Korea petitioned the Constitutional Court to dissolve the Unified Progressive Party, citing its pro-North Korean activities such as the 2013 South Korean sabotage plot. On 19 December 2014, the Court ruled 8-1 that the Unified Progressive Party be dissolved. This ruling was quite controversial in South Korea.

=== Republic of China (Taiwan) ===
Article 5 of the Additional Articles of the Constitution of the Republic of China clearly states that any political party whose purpose or behaviour threatens the existence of the Republic of China or constitutional order of liberal democracy is unconstitutional, and the Constitutional Court can dissolve it.

=== Chile ===
Article 8 of the 1980 Constitution originally declared acts and groups promoting violence, totalitarianism or class struggle as unconstitutional, as well as barring those found guilty of such from political and some civic activities for a number of years. As a result of the 1989 referendum, multiple reforms to the Constitution were introduced, repealing Article 8 in its original form entirely, but amending Article 19 N°15 to replace it in much of its function (without a specific mention of class struggle), focusing on guaranteeing political pluralism and safeguarding the constitutional and democratic order.

== See also ==
- Communist Party of Germany v. the Federal Republic of Germany
- Eternity clause in Germany
- Guided democracy
- National security
- Paradox of tolerance
- Socialist Reich Party

== Literature ==
- Andras Sajo. From militant democracy to the preventive state? Constitutional Law Review No. 1
- Rory O'Connell Militant Democracy and Human Rights Principles Constitutional Law Review No. 1
