= Israel's Lobby =

2026 book

Israel's Lobby: America in the Grip of a Foreign Power
- Author: Eli Clifton; Ian Lustick
- Publisher: Atria Publishing Group
- Publication date: August 11, 2026
- ISBN: 978-1-668-21086-4

Israel's Lobby: America in the Grip of a Foreign Power is a 2026 book by Eli Clifton and Ian Lustick, focused on the Israel lobby in the United States.

== Background ==
Clifton is a co-founder and senior adviser at the Quincy Institute for Responsible Statecraft. Lustick is a professor emeritus at the University of Pennsylvania of political science, specializing in Arab-Israeli relations and US foreign policy.

The idea that the pro-Israel lobby wields immense power and secretly controls events has been a common belief among conspiracy theorists for a long time. This view gained renewed attention in 2007 when John Mearsheimer and Stephen Walt released an article called "The Israel Lobby and U.S. Foreign Policy," which gave an academic appearance to a weak argument. Almost twenty years later, Eli Clifton and Ian Lustick have continued this line of thought in their book "The Israel Lobby: America in the Grip of a Foreign Power".

== Contents ==
The authors claim the "special relationship" with Israel is a bad deal for the United States, writing, "The repeated sacrifice of American national interests, repeated betrayals of traditional American values, and repeated exposure of the United States to the risks of instability, war and loss of influence in the international arena."

The authors identified 9 billionaires, including American, Israeli, and dual Israel and American citizens who indicate that "Israel is the driving motivation for their engagement in American politics." The 9 donors have collectively donated over $1.2 billion in disclosed donations since 2012.

These include:

- Miriam Adelson and her late husband, Sheldon Adelson
- Paul Singer
- Bernie Marcus
- Jeff Yass
- Larry Ellison
- Haim Saban

== Reviews ==
In August 2026, Daniel Levy writing for The Nation described Israel's Lobby as "a kind of spiritual sequel to Mearsheimer and Walt’s study", referencing the 2007 book The Israel Lobby and U.S. Foreign Policy by John Mearsheimer and Stephen Walt. Levy wrote that "Walt and Mearsheimer, and now Lustick and Clifton, have helped demystify how the Israel lobby works in the United States."

Both Mearsheimer and Walt have endorsed the new book.

== See also ==
- The Israel Lobby and U.S. Foreign Policy, 2007 book by John Mearsheimer on the Israel lobby in the United States
- Hasbara – Public relations work by the State of Israel
