= Association for Israel Studies =

International learned society (1985–)

Association for Israel Studies (AIS) is an international, interdisciplinary scholarly society devoted to the academic and professional study of modern Israel.

== History ==
The Association for Israel Studies (AIS) was founded in the U.S. as an independent scholarly association by a group of scholars in 1985 to critically study Israel as an academic topic. Early involved scholars included Ian Lustick, a proponent of the one-state solution, and Gershon Shafir, a critical sociologists who studied Zionism as a form of colonialism. Since its founding, AIS has been affiliated with the Middle East Studies Association (MESA).

When MESA members voted in 2022 to endorse the BDS movement, AIS members were the only scholars to speak out against the proposal. At AIS's annual conference, its membership voted to officially disaffiliate from MESA.

== Membership and Affiliates ==
The Association's membership is composed of individual scholars from multiple fields of study. The association also offers institutional membership to college and university programs, departments, research institutions, and cultural organizations that focus on Israel Studies [2].

== Officials ==
AIS President for the 2021-2023 period is Professor Arieh Saposnik[3]. Vice-president is Professor Raphael Cohen-Almagor [4] (Hull University). The organization's Executive Director is Dr. Asaf Shamis [5] (University of Haifa) and its Treasurer is Dr. Ilan Ben Ami [6] (The Open University of Israel). Former presidents includes: Prof. Myron (Mike) Aronoff, Prof. Robert Freedman, Prof. Gregory Mahler, Prof. Ian Lustick, Prof. Pnina Lahav, Prof. Ilan Peleg, Prof. Hanna Herzog, Prof. Alan Dowty, Prof. Joel Migdal, Pro. Rachel Brenner, Prof. Ilan Troen, Prof. Aviva Halamish, Prof. Gad Barzilai, Prof. Menachem Hofnung, Prof. Donna Robinson Divine, and Prof. Yael Aronoff.

== Journal ==
In 1986, the AIS began to publish a scholarly journal, Israel Studies Review (ISR), published a few times a year by Berghahn Books. ISR explores modern and contemporary Israel from the perspective of the social sciences, history, the humanities, and cultural studies and welcomes submissions on these subjects. The journal also pays close attention to the relationships of Israel to the Middle East and to the wider world; it encourages scholarly articles with this broader theoretical or comparative approach provided the focus remains on modern Israel.

One of the main tasks of the ISR is to review in a timely manner recent books on Israel-related themes, published in English and Hebrew. Authors and publishers are invited to send their books for review consideration.
