= Communist Party of Germany v. the Federal Republic of Germany =

1957 European Commission of Human Rights decision concerning political speech

Decided 20 July 1957
- Case: 250/57
- Nationality of parties: West Germany
- President; Humphrey Waldock

Communist Party of Germany v. the Federal Republic of Germany was a 1957 European Commission of Human Rights decision which upheld the dissolution of the Communist Party of Germany by the Federal Constitutional Court a year earlier.

== Background ==
The German federal government had petitioned for the Communist Party to be banned in 1952 on the basis that the party's revolutionary practice means "the impairment or the abolition of the fundamental liberal democratic order in the Federal Republic". Following hearings, the Federal Constitutional Court ordered in 1956 that the party be dissolved and its assets confiscated, and banned the creation of substitute organizations. The neo-Nazi Socialist Reich Party had been banned due to the same government petition back in 1952, but the Communist Party's lengthy defense in part had caused a delay. The party argued that the constitutional article 21(2) itself was unconstitutional because it violated the rights of freedom of speech and freedom of association, and that the Marxist–Leninist ideology was a "science" that should not be subjected to judicial review.

== Decision ==
The Commission referred to the article 17 of the European Convention on Human Rights, which states that no one may use the rights guaranteed by the Convention to seek the abolition of other rights, and found no need to consider the case with respect to articles 9, 10 and 11. It found the appeal inadmissible and thus upheld the ban on the party on the basis that the dictatorship of the proletariat stage advocated by the Communist doctrine in order to establish a regime is "incompatible with the Convention, inasmuch as it includes the destruction of many of the rights or freedoms enshrined therein." As a result, pursuing dictatorship is not is not compatible with the convention even if it is done with constitutional methods.

== Legacy ==
The decision is a landmark case establishing limits on freedom of expression on speech that putatively endangers democracy or is based on a totalitarian doctrine.

Many of the same arguments laid out in this decision were repeated by the European Court of Human Rights when it upheld the ban of the Welfare Party in Refah Partisi (the Welfare Party) and Others v. Turkey in 2001.

== See also ==
- Brandenburg v. Ohio
- Debs v. United States
- Dennis v. United States
- Australian Communist Party v Commonwealth
- Streitbare Demokratie
