= Elective rights =

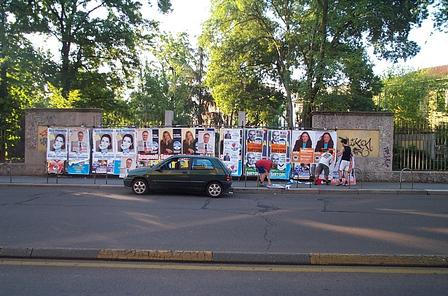
Campaigners working on posters in Milan, Italy, 2004

Two central issues for democracies are the right to candidate, and suffrage or the franchise—that is, the decision as to who is entitled to vote. For example, Athenian democracy limited the vote to male citizens, while slaves, foreigners, and women of any status were excluded. Requirements and exclusions such as these, along with racial prohibitions, have been common in democracies. The definition of legal personhood has been historically tied up with these questions.

Generally, franchise is restricted on account of one or more of the following:

- age (in all democracies),
- gender,
- nationality,
- race,
- religion,
- wealth,
- birth (e.g., inherited social status),
- education,
- previous crimes, etc.

Most contemporary democracies agree that only age, citizenship and (in some jurisdictions) serious, previously-committed crimes are the only of these restrictions which apply. One prominent exception to this is the limited representation available for denizens of the capital of the United States, Washington, DC (see District of Columbia voting rights). The legal basis of the right to candidacy and right to create a political party (nomination rules) are less clear than voting rights (suffrage) in the United States.

A recent example of how the "right to vote" changed over history is New Zealand, which was the first country to give women the right to vote (September 19, 1893), though not the right to be elected. The participation in politics via both candidacy and suffrage in Europe and the Americas is, largely, a 20th-century phenomenon.

Sex equity has been recognized in other ways in other societies, however. The Iroquois Confederacy gave a strong political role to women perhaps to as far back as its origins in the 12th century, although, as in 19th century New Zealand, this was expressed as support for a specific male, not the right to sit in council. The Iroquois Confederacy, like many Native American societies, recognized rituals to allow post-menopausal or powerful widowed women to assume the role of a man—because of this, it is possible that at some point in its history, the Confederacy permitted a full and formal role to women.

Some limited (to a greater or lesser degree) alternative voting and official appointing systems claim to be democratic. One-party states such as the People's Republic of China apply a limited form of disapproval voting that helps to signal the acceptance of those promoted into new posts. Those who do not receive very high (over 80%) acceptance generally rise no further in rank or position.

Under perestroika, shortly before its collapse, the Union of Soviet Socialist Republics under Mikhail Gorbachev implemented reforms to allow multiple candidates, all from the local Communist Party, to run against each other. Such methods are not generally viewed as providing an equivalent political expression to the right to replace an entire centralized power group by way of election, as can occur in a multi-party system.

Another means of limited democracy is that practiced in the Islamic Republic of Iran, where the right to run as a candidate is controlled by the religious authorities. Such groups as the Communist Party and the Green Party of Iran are excluded from the slate of candidates. Recent elections in Iran have suffered from very low turnout.

In the United States of America, restrictions on the right to vote due to property ownership or lack thereof, and in some places literacy, were common until the Voting Rights Act of 1965. Today all but a few states deny the right to vote to those who have been convicted of a felony at any point in their past (voting rights are, in some cases, restored via executive (on the state or federal level) pardon).

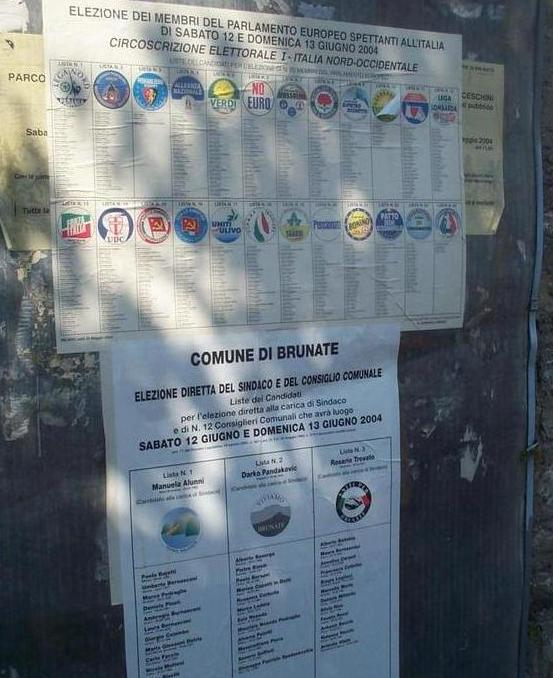
a poster for the European Parliament election 2004 in Italy, showing party lists.

In the European Union every citizen has the right to participate in the elections of the European Parliament. Not every vote is counted equally, however: Voters from bigger countries are significantly underrepresented relative to voters from smaller countries. E.g., a vote from Luxembourg carries 12 times as much weight as does a vote from Germany. Many places have similar problems with the distribution of votes per region. In the US, a Californian vote carries four times the weight of a Montana vote in the presidential election.

== See also ==
- Universal suffrage
