= Lawrence Davidson =

American professor

- Born: June 21, 1945 (age 81); Philadelphia, Pennsylvania
- Education: Rutgers University (B.A.); Georgetown University (M.A.); University of Alberta (Ph.D.)
- Occupations: Author, columnist, editor, professor
- Notable work: Islamic Fundamentalism; Cultural Genocide

Lawrence Davidson is a retired professor of Middle East History at West Chester University in West Chester, Pennsylvania. He is the author of Islamic Fundamentalism, Cultural Genocide and has focused his academic research on American foreign relations with the Middle East.

== Early life and education ==
Davidson was born to a secular Jewish household in Philadelphia, Pennsylvania in 1945. He attended Rutgers University from 1963 to 1967, where he earned a bachelor's degree in history. While attending Rutgers, Davidson developed a leftist perspective regarding the problems facing the US in the 1960s.

In 1967, Davidson was accepted into Georgetown University Master's program where he studied modern European intellectual history under Palestinian expatriate professor Hisham Sharabi. Sharabi and Davidson subsequently became close friends and one can date his interest in Palestinian, as well as Jewish and Zionist, issues from this time. During his years at Georgetown (1969–1970), Davidson became one of the founding members of the Students for a Democratic Society (SDS) at Georgetown at the height of the Vietnam War.

In 1970, with the breakup of the SDS, Davidson left the United States for Canada. He spent the next six years at the University of Alberta in Edmonton where he earned a PhD (1976) in modern European Intellectual history.

After returning to the United States in the mid-1970s, Davidson spent several years as an adjunct instructor at various colleges and universities, as well as working for a time as a middle manager at Alexian Brothers Health Systems Catholic hospital in St. Louis. Subsequently, he was contracted to write the history of Alexian Brothers’ oldest hospital. This led to his first book, The Alexian Brothers of Chicago (1990).

In 1989, Davidson joined the faculty of history at West Chester University as a tenure track professor where he taught Middle East history, the history of science, and modern European intellectual history. He retired from WCU in May 2013.

Currently, Davidson writes for his Blog To The Point Analyses and is a contributing editor for Logos: A Journal of Modern Society and Culture. Davidson is a board member of the U.S. Campaign for the Academic and Cultural Boycott of Israel.

== Cultural Genocide (2012) ==
In 2012, Rutgers University Press published Davidson's book Cultural Genocide. Davidson defines cultural genocide as the "purposeful destructive targeting of out-group cultures so as to destroy or weaken them in the process of conquest or domination".

== Books ==
- Davidson, Lawrence. The Alexian Brothers of Chicago: An Evolutionary Look at the Monastery and Modern Health Care. New York: Vantage Press, 1990.
- Davidson, Lawrence. Islamic Fundamentalism. Westport, CT: Greenwood, 1998.
- Davidson, Lawrence. America's Palestine: Popular and Official Perceptions from Balfour to Israeli Statehood. Gainesville, FL: U of Florida, 2001.
- Goldschmidt, Arthur, Lawrence Davidson, and Tom Weiner. A Concise History of the Middle East. Boulder, CO. : Westview Press, 2002.
- Davidson, Lawrence. Foreign Policy, Inc.: Privatizing America's National Interest. Lexington: U of Kentucky, 2009.
- Davidson, Lawrence. Cultural Genocide. New Brunswick, NJ: Rutgers UP, 2012.
- Davidson, Lawrence. Essays Reflecting the Art of Political and Social Analysis (Critical Political Theory and Radical Practice). Palgrave Macmillan, 2019 doi:10.1007/978-3-319-98005-8 ISBN 978-3030074364
