= Raphael Cohen-Almagor =

British academic

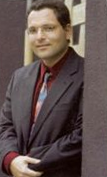
Raphael Cohen-Almagor in 2010

Raphael Cohen-Almagor (Hebrew: רפאל כהן-אלמגור; born 1961) is an Israeli/British academic.

Cohen-Almagor received his D.Phil. in political theory from Oxford University in 1991, and his B.A. and M.A. from Tel Aviv University (both magna cum laude). In 1992–1995 he lectured at the Hebrew University Law Faculty. In 1995–2007 he taught at the University of Haifa Law School, Department of Communication, and Library and Information Studies University of Haifa. In 2019, he was distinguished visiting professor to the Faculty of Laws, University College London (UCL). In 2023, he was the Olof Palme Visiting Professor at Lund University, Sweden. In 2024-2025, he was a Fellow at the Israel Institute for Advanced Studies in Jerusalem.

Cohen-Almagor has served in various organisations, including as chairperson of "The Second Generation to the Holocaust and Heroism Remembrance" Organization in Israel; founder and director of the Medical Ethics Think-tank at the Van Leer Jerusalem Institute; member of the Israel Press Council, chairperson of library and information studies, and founder and director of Center for Democratic Studies, both at the University of Haifa. Cohen-Almagor was the Yitzhak Rabin – Fulbright Visiting Professor at UCLA School of Law and Dept. of Communication, visiting professor at Johns Hopkins University, and Fellow at the Woodrow Wilson International Center for Scholars. Until 2025, he was chair in politics at the University of Hull, United Kingdom, and Founding-Director of the Middle East Study Group. In 2008–2009, he served as Deputy Dean for research at Hull Faculty of Arts and Social Sciences. In June 2023, Cohen-Almagor was elected President of the Association of Israel Studies, an international scholarly association established in the United States in 1984 and based in Israel.

Cohen-Almagor co-drafted the Israel Dying Patient Law, which impacted patient-physician relationships and promoted patient's autonomy and decision-making capacity. By July 2022, 12,393 people signed advance directives and deposited them in the Ministry of Health depository. Cohen-Almagor has also formulated principles conducive to safeguarding fundamental civil rights.

== Authored books ==
- Middle Eastern Shores (poetry, Hebrew, 1993)
- The Boundaries of Liberty and Tolerance (1994)
- Basic Issues in Israeli Democracy (Ed., Hebrew, 1999)
- The Right to Die with Dignity (2001)
- Euthanasia in the Netherlands: The Policy and Practice of Mercy Killing (2004)
- Speech, Media and Ethics: The Limits of Free Expression (2005)
- The Scope of Tolerance: Studies on the Costs of Free Expression and Freedom of the Press (2006)
- The Democratic "Catch": Free Speech and Its Limits (2007)
- Voyages (poetry, Hebrew, 2007)
- Confronting the Internet's Dark Side: Moral and Social Responsibility on the Free Highway (2015)
- Just, Reasonable Multiculturalism: Liberalism, Culture and Coercion (2021)
- The Republic, Secularism and Security: France versus the Burqa and the Niqab (2022)
- Resolving the Israeli-Palestinian Conflict: A Critical Study of Peace Negotiations, Mediation and Facilitation Between Israel and the PLO (2026)

== Edited books ==
- Basic Issues in Israeli Democracy (Hebrew, 1999)
- Liberal Democracy and the Limits of Tolerance: Essays in Honor and Memory of Yitzhak Rabin (2000)
- Medical Ethics at the Dawn of the 21st Century (2000)
- Challenges to Democracy: Essays in Honour and Memory of Isaiah Berlin (2000)
- Moral Dilemmas in Medicine (Hebrew, 2002)
- Israeli Democracy at the Crossroads (2005)
- Israeli Institutions at the Crossroads (2005)
- Public Responsibility in Israel (with Asa Kasher and Ori Arbel-Ganz, Hebrew, 2012)
