= Israel Studies Review =

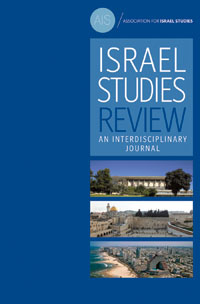
- Discipline: Area studies
- Language: English
- Edited by: Oded Haklai and Adia Mendelson-Maoz

Publication details
- Former names: Israel Studies Bulletin, Israel Studies Forum
- History: 1986-present
- Publisher: Berghahn Books
- Frequency: Triannually

Standard abbreviations
- ISO 4: Isr. Stud. Rev.

Indexing
- ISSN: 2159-0370 (print); 2159-0389 (web)
- OCLC no.: 795179168

Links
- Journal homepage; Online archive

The Israel Studies Review is a peer-reviewed academic journal published on behalf of the Association for Israel Studies by Berghahn Books and covering the study of all aspects of society, history, politics, and culture of Israel. The journal was previously known as the Israel Studies Bulletin from 1992 to 2001 and as the Israel Studies Forum from 2001 to 2010. The editors of the journal since summer 2021 are Oded Haklai (Queen's University, Ontario, Canada) and Adia Mendelson-Maoz (The Open University of Israel, Israel). Rami Zeedan (University of Kansas, Kansas, USA) was the journal's book review editor until 2025. In 2026, the journal began to be published in an open access format.

== Abstracting and indexing ==
The journal is abstracted and indexed in:

- Academic Search Premier
- Columbia International Affairs Online
- eHRAF: Collection in Ethnography
- Expanded Academic ASAP
- Index for Jewish Periodicals
- International Bibliography of Book Reviews of Scholarly Literature on the Humanities and Social Sciences
- International Bibliography of Periodical Literature
- Index Islamicus
- International Political Science Abstracts
- MLA International Bibliography
- Sociological Abstracts
