= Nathan J. Brown (political scientist) =

American scholar of Middle Eastern law and politics

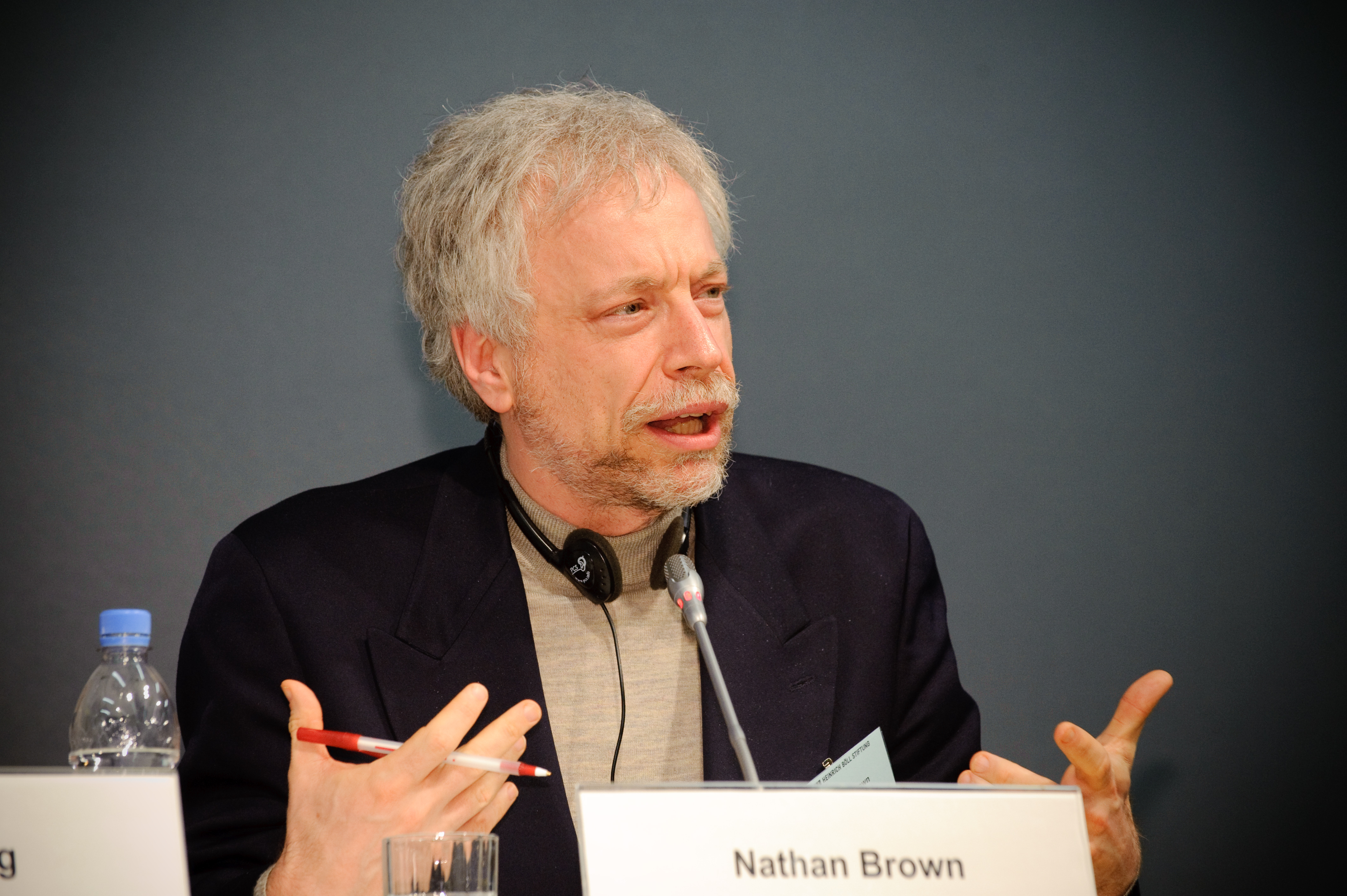
- Nathan J. Brown
- Born: July 9, 1958 (age 68)
- Education: Princeton University; University of Chicago
- Scientific career
- Fields: Political science
- Workplaces: Elliott School of International Affairs, George Washington University

Nathan J. Brown (born July 9, 1958) is an American scholar of Middle Eastern law and politics at the George Washington University. Brown is Professor of Political Science and International Affairs at the Elliott School of International Affairs. He is the former director of its Institute for Middle East Studies.

== Education ==
He received his BA from the University of Chicago and his PhD from Princeton University.

== Career and work ==
His work is focused on Islamic politics, particularly in Egypt and the Palestinian territories, having his work published in The Washington Post and Islamist movements in the Arab world. His highest cited paper is "The rule of law in the Arab world: courts in Egypt and the Gulf" at 562 times, according to Google Scholar.

Brown served two years as a senior associate at the Carnegie Endowment for International Peace. He was a scholar at the Middle East Institute. He is currently on the Board of Advisors of the Project on Middle East Democracy. Brown was selected as a 2013 Guggenheim Fellow for Near East Studies.

== Selected publications ==
- Peasant Politics in Modern Egypt: The Struggle Against the State. Yale University Press, 1990.
- The Rule of Law in the Arab World: Courts in Egypt and the Gulf. Cambridge University Press, 1997.
- Constitutions in a Non-Constitutional World: Arab Basic Laws and the Prospects for Accountable Government. State University of New York Press, 2001.
- Palestinian Politics After the Oslo Accords: Resuming Arab Palestine. University of California Press, 2003.
- When Victory Is Not an Option: Islamist Movements in Arab Politics. Cornell University Press, 2012.
- Evolution after Revolution: Egypt, Israel and the United States. (2013). Israel Journal of Foreign Affairs, VII (1), 9-12.
- Arguing Islam After the Revival of Arab Politics. Oxford University Press, 2017.

== See also ==
- Peter Mandaville
