= Iran Pen Society =

Iranian association of writers

- Established: Officially on May 27, 1999
- Type: Literary society, Cultural, non-profit
- Purpose: Unite committed litterateur of the Country; Promoting the Culture and Literature of the Country; Improving the quality of life of the litterateurs; Introducing literature and culture to other nations; Protecting freedom of expression and pen within the framework of the constitution; Lending and creating financial credit for the litterateurs; Investments and financial contributions to fund the Pen Society; Providing intellectual and consulting services to other institutions to improve the quality of regulations about litterateurs; Holding ceremonies and so on to improve the quality of community study; Quality upgrade of literary and research works by creating an environment for exchange of information and experiences; Promoting divine and humane values in the pen field; Creating the conditions for a more positive presence of litterateurs in the historical and social developments of the country
- Headquarters: Tehran, Iran
- Location: Iran
- Members: About 200 people: Poets; Writers; Critics; Translators; Researchers; and Thinkers in the field of humanities
- Chairman: Mohsen Parviz (October 2018)
- Vice chairman: Pedram Pak Ayin (October 2018)
- Secretary: Razieh Tojjar (October 2018)
- Treasurer: Abbas Ali Baratpour (October 2018)
- Website: anjomanghalam.ir

The Iran Pen Society (Persian: انجمن قلم ایران) is an Iranian association of writers, formed in 1998 by some activists in the field of writing, but officially began operating after obtaining a legal license from Ministry of Culture and Islamic Guidance on 27 May 1999. The Iran Pen Society is the only official legal association of litterateurs whose members include poets, writers, critics, translators, researchers, and thinkers in the humanities. The association is not affiliated with any political, religious, or governmental party, group, organization, domestic or foreign. The Iran Pen Society has about 200 members.

== Purposes ==
The following are some of the goals of the establishment of the Iran Pen Society:

- Unite the litterateurs of the country committed to guild issues
- Providing the conditions for a more productive presence of litterateurs in the process of social and cultural developments and events in Iranian society
- Defend the freedom of expression, thought and pen within the country's constitution
- Spreading the highest spiritual and human values in the pen field
- Improving the quality of the works presented in the field of pen, by creating suitable contexts for exchange of information and experiences among litterateurs
- Creating a centrality for communicating between artistic and cultural centers and litterateurs
- Move towards introducing literature, art and intellectual products of the country to other cultural and artistic communities in the world
- Supporting the intellectual property rights of writers and facilitating the process of publishing their works
- Resolving legal disputes and legal issues regarding literary works and its practitioners
- Improving the quality of Iranian society's study by presenting and implementing appropriate plans in this regard
- Providing intellectual and consulting services to other institutions to improve the quality regulations about litterateurs

== Founders ==
Some of the founders of the Iran Pen Society are:

- Hamid Sabzevari
- Abdolkarim Beeazar Shirazi
- Ali Akbar Velayati
- Ali Larijani
- Razieh Tojjar
- Shamoddin Rahmani
- Ali Moallem
- Hamid Gerogan
- Mohsen Chiniforoushan
- Mohammad Reza Sarshar
- Ebrahim Hassanbeigi
- Mohammad Mirkiani
- Mohsen Parviz
- Samira Aslanpour
- Seyyed Mahdi Shojaee
- Maryam Jamshidi
- Maryam Sabaqzadeh Irani
- Mohammadreza Javadi

== Golden Pen Award ==
The Iran Pen Society Established the Golden Pen Award in Iran. This prize is for Best Poetry, Fiction, Research and Literary Criticism works and awarded annually on National Pen Day in Iran. The Golden Pen Festival was held to 16 courses in Iran so far.

== Important actions ==
The Iran Pen Society has pursued many activities in the field of Iranian art and culture, the most important of which are:

- The suggestion of naming a day known as "World Pen Day in the Islamic World", this day was finally registered and announced in the official calendar of Iran as National Pen Day (14 Tir, July 5).
- Proposal to grant equivalent university degrees to poets, writers, scholars and literary critics, like other disciplines. After years of effort, the proposal was finally approved in October 2006 by the Supreme Council of the Cultural Revolution.
- Proposal to publication of one hundred works (fiction, poetry, research and literary criticism) from one hundred novice author, with the participation of Ministry of Culture and Islamic Guidance. The proposal was approved and dozens of titles were published so far.
- Proposal to publish 40000 pages of the work of forty pioneering poets and authors, with the participation of Ministry of Culture and Islamic Guidance. It has been approved and has published more than 28653 pages of these works so far.
- Establishment of the literary-cultural quarterly magazine "Ashabe Qalam" (Companions of the Pen).
- Establishment of the specialized monthly magazine "Eghlime Naghd" (The Criticize Climate).
- Donate dozens of loans to members.
- Efforts to form the "Union of Islamic Writers".
- Meetings and consultations with some foreign literary and cultural organizations and entities (including the Union of Arab Writers).
- Holding courses in storytelling with the participation of the Foundation for the Preservation and Publication of Sacred Defense Works and Values, Story Critic Sessions, and "Salam bar Nasrollah" Literary Festival with the participation of relevant institutions.

== See also ==
- Society for the National Heritage of Iran
- Glory Entertainment (The Association of Tehran Young Voice Actors)
- Academy of Persian Language and Literature
- Owj Arts and Media Organization
- Society of Iranian Calligraphists
