= Intent and incitement in the Gaza genocide =

In assessments of the Gaza genocide, experts state that statements by Israeli political and military leaders—coupled with eliminationist media rhetoric, and Israel's conduct in Gaza—indicate genocidal intent and incitement against the Palestinian people in the Gaza Strip. Genocidal intent is also evidenced by the scale and systematic nature of actions that exceed any legitimate military objective, including the extensive targeting of children, widespread sexual violence, the destruction of cultural heritage, and the imposition of life-destroying conditions, together with the persistence of these practices despite full awareness of their catastrophic effects.

Both a United Nations commission of inquiry and Amnesty International documented a "pattern of conduct" by Israeli authorities, concluding that genocidal intent is the "only reasonable inference" that could be drawn based on the evidence. A United Nations panel also concluded that statements made by Israeli officials indicate genocidal intent.

Multiple genocide studies experts—including the Lemkin Institute for Genocide Prevention, Genocide Watch and others—draw attention to the multitude of verbal statements made by Israeli officials that dehumanize Palestinians and which incite, justify, or praise atrocities against them. The United Nations commission of inquiry found that Israeli officials—President Isaac Herzog, Prime Minister Benjamin Netanyahu, and former Defence Minister Yoav Gallant—had engaged in the crime of "direct and public incitement to commit genocide" with their comments. Incitement-to-genocide is a stand-alone crime that is prosecutable even if genocide does not occur. Genocidal intent and incitement have also been attributed to Israeli journalists and United States congressmen.

== Legal standard ==
According to a 2025 United Nations commission of inquiry that convened on Israel's actions in Gaza, genocidal intent can be established through "direct evidence, such as statements expressing an intent to destroy", or inferred from "circumstantial evidence, taking into account the totality of the evidence, by inference through the examination of the pattern of conduct".

== Background ==
Since its foundation in 1948 and the Nakba, Israel has been accused of carrying out genocide against Palestinians during the Israeli–Palestinian conflict. Israel's treatment has been characterised as "slow-motion genocide", as well as a corollary or expression of settler colonialism and indigenous land theft.

== After 7 October 2023 ==
Approximate situation on October 7–8

On 7 October, after armed incursions and massacres in Israel, Prime Minister Benjamin Netanyahu vowed to exact a "huge price" by turning Hamas hideouts "into rubble", while minister of defense Yoav Gallant declared, "We are fighting human animals and we are acting accordingly." Professor Omer Bartov interprets these statements as genocidal intent. Scholar Mark Levene noted the increasing rhetoric of genocide and ethnic cleansing under the preceding Netanyahu governments.

The Israeli historian Raz Segal and legal scholar Luigi Daniele also pointed to increasing genocidal rhetoric before October 2023, highlighting a May 2023 Times of Israel article that said that the only way to achieve peace is to "obliterate" Palestine. Segal and Daniele draw parallels between that article's rhetoric and scholarship that points to Russian media outlets' rhetoric in the Russian invasion of Ukraine as genocidal. Segal and Daniele also point to previous comments by National Security Minister Itamar Ben-Gvir, the former Knesset member Ayelet Shaked, and Finance Minister Bezalel Smotrich, who in February 2023 called for the destruction of Palestinian villages in the West Bank. The genocide scholar Shmuel Lederman detailed how these comments by Smotrich, alongside others denying Palestinian statehood and calling for their destruction or removal from territory claimed by Israel, influenced Hamas' decisions before October 2023. News outlets at the time of Smotrich's comments also highlighted their genocidal nature.

In a report presented to the UNHRC in March 2024, the legal scholar Francesca Albanese concluded that Israel was committing genocide. She wrote that genocidal intent can be inferred from "the totality of conduct targeting the totality of Palestinians, in the totality of the occupied Palestinian territory". Israel rejected the report. Albanese later accused Israel of "carrying out a systematic campaign of forced displacement, destruction, and genocidal acts against Palestinians in Gaza and the West Bank".

In June 2024, historian Yoav Di-Capua said a "genocidal mindset" was pervasive among settler communities and politicians in Israel, often mirroring Hamas' own genocidal ideology. He charted the history of this ideology among Israel's "ultra-orthodox Zionist nationalists", or Hardal, from the 1970s up to the Gaza war, and its influence on the politics of Netanyahu's government, particularly Bezalel Smotrich and Itamar Ben-Gvir. According to Di-Capua, this genocidal ideology included Jewish supremacy and a desire for maximalist territorial expansion across the biblical Land of Israel. Di-Capua described Netanyahu as a "political captive" of Hardal, saying he had "echoed" their rhetoric of "eradication". He said Smotrich and Ben-Gvir seek the adoption of this ideology as national policy and are using the Gaza War to implement their plan.

== Statements by Israeli officials ==
=== Israeli prime minister and cabinet ministers ===
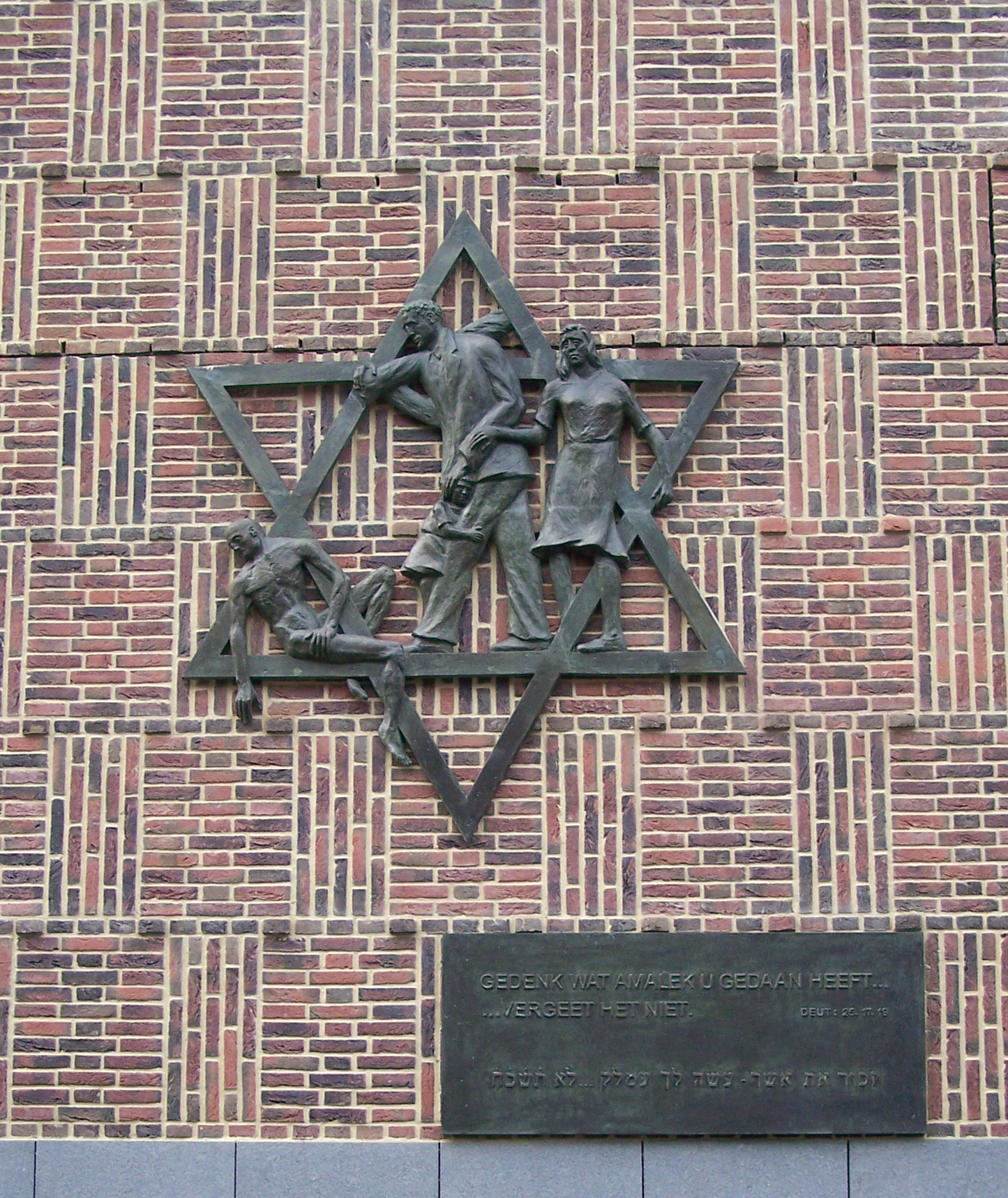
"Davidster" by Dick Stins, also known as "the Amalek monument", is a Holocaust memorial in The Hague. The text at the side is from Deuteronomy 25:17, 19 – "Remember what Amalek has done to you ... do not forget."

The nonprofit organization Law for Palestine compiled a database of over 500 statements by Israeli officials indicating incitement and intent in Gaza. Zoé Samudzi, a sociologist and genocide studies scholar, stated in September 2025 that most experts now believed "annihilatory intent has rarely been more explicit than the repeated comments made by Israeli leadership in the progression of the state's aggression from the days after 7 October 2023".

According to scholars Mark Levene and Abdelwahab El-Affendi, since 7 October 2023, official and semi-official sources have engaged in rhetoric suggestive of genocidal intent. The Israeli human rights lawyer Michael Sfard said that the 7 October attacks, the Gaza war hostage crisis, and Hamas's war crimes "generated rage that transformed what has been the rhetoric of marginalised groups into a flood of statements now made by politicians, journalists and celebrities, ... provid[ing] a tailwind" for others to find such speech acceptable.

On 9 October 2023, Israeli minister of defense Yoav Gallant said:

I have ordered a complete siege on the Gaza Strip. There will be no electricity, no food, no fuel. Everything is closed. We are fighting human animals and we are acting accordingly.

The statement was characterised as dehumanisation. According to Kenneth Roth, while some excuse this remark as referring only to Hamas, the context makes clear that "human animals" refers to everyone in Gaza. On 10 October, Gallant said: "Gaza won't return to what it was before. There will be no Hamas. We will eliminate everything."

In May 2025, Netanyahu said in closed-door testimony to members of the Knesset that Israel was "destroying more and more houses [in Gaza, and Palestinians accordingly] have nowhere to return", and that "the only obvious result will be Gazans choosing to emigrate outside of the Strip". The International Commission of Jurists characterised these statements as support for forced displacement, and former UK Supreme Court justice Jonathan Sumption said that they would be likely to substantiate a case of genocidal intent. (Note: Sumption wrote: "Statements like these from the prime minister and senior ministers in his cabinet have to be considered together with the sheer scale of the human casualties and the indiscriminate physical destruction inflicted on their orders. The most plausible explanation of current Israeli policy is that its object is to induce Palestinians as an ethnic group to leave the Gaza Strip for other countries by bombing, shooting and starving them if they remain. A court would be likely to regard that as genocide.")

In October 2023, Israeli energy (later defense) minister Israel Katz said: "All the civilian population in Gaza is ordered to leave immediately. We will win. They will not receive a drop of water or a single battery until they leave the world." In July 2025, Israel Katz, now the Defense Minister, instructed the IDF to relocate all Gazans to a "humanitarian zone" in the destroyed city of Rafah, in preparation for an unspecified "emigration plan". Legal experts condemned this as a violation of international law, including crimes against humanity, and an open letter by Israeli legal scholars said that the plan "could amount to the crime of genocide".

Israeli minister of agriculture Avi Dichter called for the war to be "Gaza's Nakba". Following the October 7 attacks, then Minister of Intelligence Gila Gamliel recommended a plan which proposed the forced expulsion of Palestinians from Gaza into Egypt. Minister of Heritage Amihai Eliyahu called for dropping an atomic bomb on Gaza. Minister of Communications Shlomo Karhi advocated for the forced removal of civilians and for Israel to settle the region, a position that other ministers endorsed. Dov Waxman said that some of the rhetoric right-wing ministers use can be seen as "potentially genocidal" in its dehumanisation of Palestinian civilians. He added that these statements can have only limited impact on Israeli policy, as they were made by ministers "not in the war cabinet", but are still concerning. Minister of Education Yoav Kisch said "Those are animals, they have no right to exist. I am not debating the way it will happen, but they need to be exterminated." He further said "until we see hundreds of thousands fleeing Gaza, we, the IDF has not achieved its mission."

May Golan, the Minister for Social Equality, said after the October 7th attacks that "All of Gaza’s infrastructures must be destroyed to its foundation and their electricity cut off immediately. The war is not against Hamas but against the state of Gaza.” Golan later said "I am personally proud of the ruins of Gaza, and that every baby, even 80 years from now, will tell their grandchildren what the Jews did." In a speech before a rally advocating for Jewish settlements in Gaza, Golan called for "another Nakba."

In April 2024 during a public event, Finance Minister Bezalel Smotrich said of Gaza: "this place does not exist, cannot possibly exist. This is delusional: we are negotiating with those who should never have existed". In August 2024 Smotrich said that "it might be justified and moral" to "starve 2 million people", lamenting that the world would not allow it. The Knesset member Ofer Cassif claims the plan for genocide dates back to Smotrich's Subjugation Plan in 2017, which he called the "prime exhibit" of Israel's genocidal intent. On 6 May 2025 Smotrich said that Gaza would be "entirely destroyed" and that Palestinians would "leave in great numbers to third countries". National Security Minister Itamar Ben-Gvir, the leader of the Otzma Yehudit Party, echoed Smotrich in calling for Israel to block all humanitarian aid into Gaza until Israeli hostages were released, and called for the expulsion of Palestinians from Gaza, referring to such an expulsion as "voluntary migration". Both Smotrich and Ben-Gvir were sanctioned by the United Kingdom, Canada, Australia and New Zealand for inciting violence against Palestinians, while the government of Slovenia banned them from the country.

In April 2024, Minister of Economy and Industry Nir Barkat was interviewed on the Morning Joe show. When co-host Mika Brzezinski asked Barkat about "civilians starving in Gaza", Barkat responded by using air quotes to refer to "innocent people in Gaza", implying he did not believe there were innocents in Gaza. Barkat said "We don't want anybody, any civilian, to suffer. And we collaborate with the world, helping the 'innocent people, the innocent people in Gaza' — that 80% of them, 70, 80% of them support October 7 — we don't want anybody to starve or anything." Barkat had previously, in February 2024, posted on X that all humanitarian aid to Gaza be cut off until Israeli hostages were released by Hamas.

In July 2025, during the Gaza Strip Famine, Miri Regev, Minister of Transport and Road Safety denied that there was an ongoing famine and said there were no innocent people in Gaza. "There is no famine. There is no humanitarian disaster. And according to the hostages' testimonies – there are also no innocents or uninvolved people," Regev said.

In August 2025, Eli Cohen, Minister of Energy and Infrastructure and former minister of foreign affairs, called for Gaza City to be turned into a wasteland, saying "Gaza City itself should be exactly like Rafah, which we turned into a city of ruins."

==== Amalek ====
Israeli prime minister Benjamin Netanyahu's repeated invocation of Amalek and the phrase "remember what Amalek did to you" during the war has been considered evidence of genocidal intent by many critics, including South Africa. Finance Minister Smotrich also said, "There are no half measures ... Rafah, Deir al-Balah, Nuseirat – total annihilation. 'Thou shalt blot out the remembrance of Amalek from under heaven.'" (Note: In a criminal complaint submitted to the Prosecutor of the International Criminal Court in December 2024, Omer Shatz gave an alternative version of Smotrich's words. He quoted Smotrich as saying: "We must not do the job halfway. Rafah, Deir al-Balah, Nuseirat, total extermination, erase the memory of the Amalek living under this sky.") The Israeli newspaper Haaretz described his comments as a call to genocide. "Remember what Amalek did to you" (Note: Hebrew: זכור את אשר עשה לך עמלק (zchor et asher ase lech amlak)) is used at Holocaust memorials, including Yad Vashem. Amalek was "the foe that God ordered the ancient Israelites to genocide", and scholars have called the verse an instance of "divinely mandated genocide". In February 2025, Norman J. W. Goda argued that there was undue attention paid to this phrase to conclude genocidal intent. Genocide Watch states that "That the President of Israel invoked this divine mandate [of Amalek] for genocide is evidence of his genocidal intent to destroy in part the Palestinian people of Gaza. The historical parallel is precise: Palestinians in Gaza live in nearly the same area as the ancient Amalekites." In response to this accusation, the Israel Democracy Institute issued an opinion stating that the references to Amalek in the context of the war were misunderstood. According to the opinion, the commandment to annihilate Amalek has effectively been erased from Jewish law; moreover, the indictment misquoted Netanyahu - he did not refer to the commandment to annihilate Amalek, but rather to the commandment to remember what Amalek did.

=== Israeli president and members of Israeli parliament ===
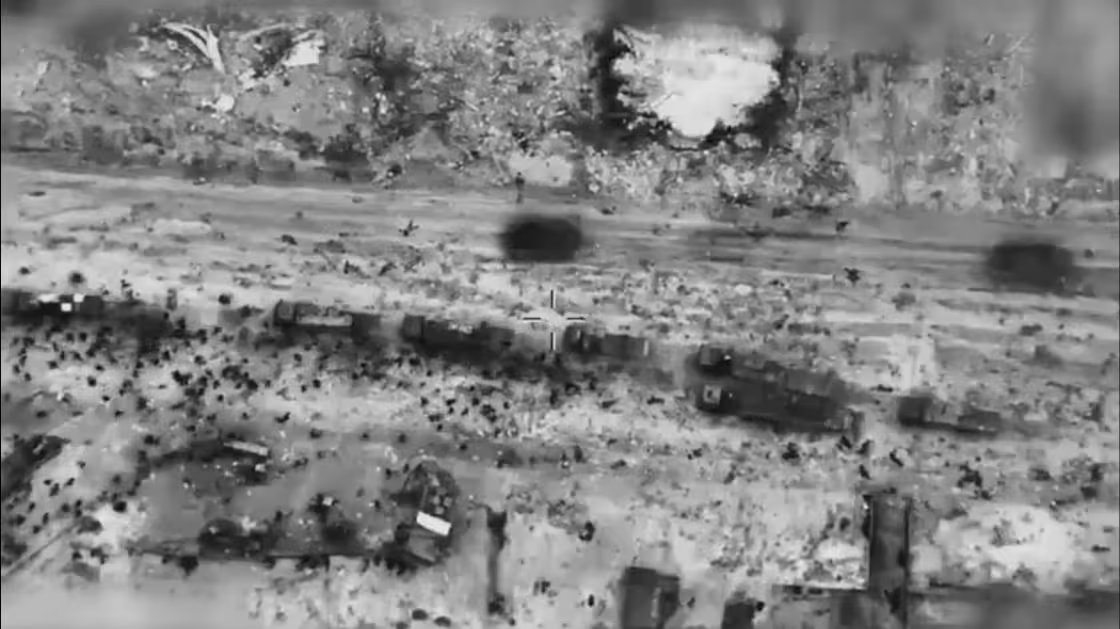
An aerial view of the Flour Massacre captured by an Israeli drone. Aid trucks and Palestinian pedestrians (some dead) are visible.

President Isaac Herzog blamed the "entire nation" of Palestine for the 7 October attack. He added: "It is not true, this rhetoric about civilians being not aware, not involved." The statement was made in response to a journalist from ITV News asking what Israel was doing to alleviate the suffering of Gazan civilians. Herzog later claimed that his remarks had been taken out of context, saying that he was attempting to highlight "the involvement of many residents" and that he accepted that there are innocent Palestinians in Gaza.

Deputy Speaker of the Knesset Nissim Vaturi wrote that the government was allowing too much aid to enter Gaza and that the IDF should "burn Gaza now". He said that Israel's goal was "erasing the Gaza Strip from the face of the Earth." When asked to clarify his statements by Kol BaRama, Vaturi reiterated that Gaza and its inhabitants must be destroyed, saying: "I don't think there are any innocent people there now... If there is an innocent person there, we will know about them. Whoever stays there should be eliminated, period." In 2025, Vaturi called Palestinians "scoundrels" and "subhumans" and called for the adult men in Gaza to be killed.

Yitzhak Kroizer, who represents the extreme-right Otzma Yehudit party in the Knesset, said that the "Gaza Strip should be flattened, and for all of them there is but one sentence, and that is death." Tally Gotliv of the Likud party called for the use of nuclear weapons against Gaza. Gotliv later praised the value of revenge in relation to the Gaza war, saying "'May your village burn!' Yes yes as far as I'm concerned it is a great chant to wish upon Gaza to be erased and go up in flames." She further called to "Wipe out the memory of Amalek!" Likud Knesset member Boaz Bismuth said in relation to Gaza: "It is forbidden to take mercy on the cruel, there's no place for any humanitarian gestures. The memory of Amalek must be erased." Moshe Saada, also of the Likud party, approvingly quoted an acquaintance who told him that everyone in Gaza should be killed. Ariel Kallner of the Likud party wrote that there is "one goal: Nakba! A Nakba that will overshadow the Nakba of [1948]. Nakba in Gaza and Nakba to anyone who dares to join". Galit Distel-Atbaryan of Likud wrote "Erase Gaza from the face of the earth. Let the Gazan monsters rush to the southern border and flee into Egypt, or die. And let them die badly. Gaza should be wiped off the map, and fire and brimstone on the heads of the Nazis in Judea and Samaria. Jewish wrath to shake the earth around the world. We need a cruel, vengeful IDF here. Anything less is immoral." In 2024, Keti Shitrit of Likud said "If you ask me personally, not as a member of the Knesset, I'd flatten Gaza. I have no sentimental feelings about it, because there's no separating the murderers of women and children from the citizens of Gaza." Zvika Fogel of Otzma Yehudit called for the expulsion of Palestinian residents in Gaza and called for the resettlement of Jews in the Gaza Strip. In May 2025, Zvi Sukkot of the Religious Zionist Party appeared to celebrate public indifference to Palestinian civilian casualties, saying "Last night, almost 100 Gazans were killed. And the question you asked me just now had nothing to do with Gaza. Do you know why? Because it doesn't interest anyone. Everyone has gotten used to [the fact] that [we can] kill 100 Gazans in one night during a war and nobody cares."

Almog Cohen, a Knesset member for Otzma Yehudit, called for collective punishment of the Palestinians in Gaza in October 2023, shortly after Hamas took Israeli hostages. "Destroy a neighborhood in Gaza every day the abductees are in their hands. If we blink, we run out of global credit. Every day that the abductees are with them, a neighborhood must be destroyed on its inhabitants and I will be called cruel. It is a Middle Eastern language," Cohen said.

After Hamas released the bodies of the Bibas family, Ohad Tal of the Religious Zionist Party compared Gaza to the biblical city of Sodom, which was destroyed by God for its wickedness. Tal said that "No one there in Gaza protested, no one in this Sodom condemned, no one tried to save them. A collective of murder, and there is no righteous person in Sodom." Avihai Boaron of Likud compared Hamas to Amalek, saying "Only a neo-Nazi-Shiite ideology of systematic murder of Jews, based on a brutal and sadistic culture, can give rise to such animalistic barbarity. If they could, they would murder us all and rape all our daughters. This is the very nature of Amalek. His purpose. His whole essence, to hunt down the Jews and kill and destroy them." Boaron had previously, in 2011, published an editorial that called for Amalekites to be put in extermination camps.

In January 2025, eight members of the Knesset's Foreign Affairs and Defense Committee signed a letter to Defense Minister Israel Katz proposing that Katz order the destruction of all of Gaza's food and power supplies and "kill anyone without a white flag". The Palestinian official Rawhi Fattouh said of the letter, "The Knesset has become a den for bloodthirsty extremists...now they are astonished that Palestinians in Gaza are still alive". Osher Shekalim, a Likud member of the Knesset who signed the letter, also called for the forced displacement of the Palestinians in the Gaza Strip, saying emigration from Gaza should not be voluntary. "It's either us or them. Anyone who defines themselves as Palestinian is saying, I am your enemy. I don't want you here," Shekalim said.

The Knesset members Amit Halevi and Limor Son Har-Melech disagreed with a doctor who argued that suffering children in Gaza should receive "painkillers or minimal medical treatment". Halevi said, "When fighting a group like this, the distinctions that exist in a normal world don't exist." Halevi and Son Har-Melech both also claimed that reports of starvation in Gaza were Hamas lies. Halevi had previously said: "We want to occupy the territory to cleanse it of the enemy; otherwise, it will kill your children and kidnap your grandchildren again." Halevi had additionally called newborn Palestinian babies in Gaza "terrorists." In May 2025, Simcha Rothman of the Religious Zionist Party said that the children of Gaza were his enemies and denied that children in Gaza were starving.

=== Israeli army officers ===
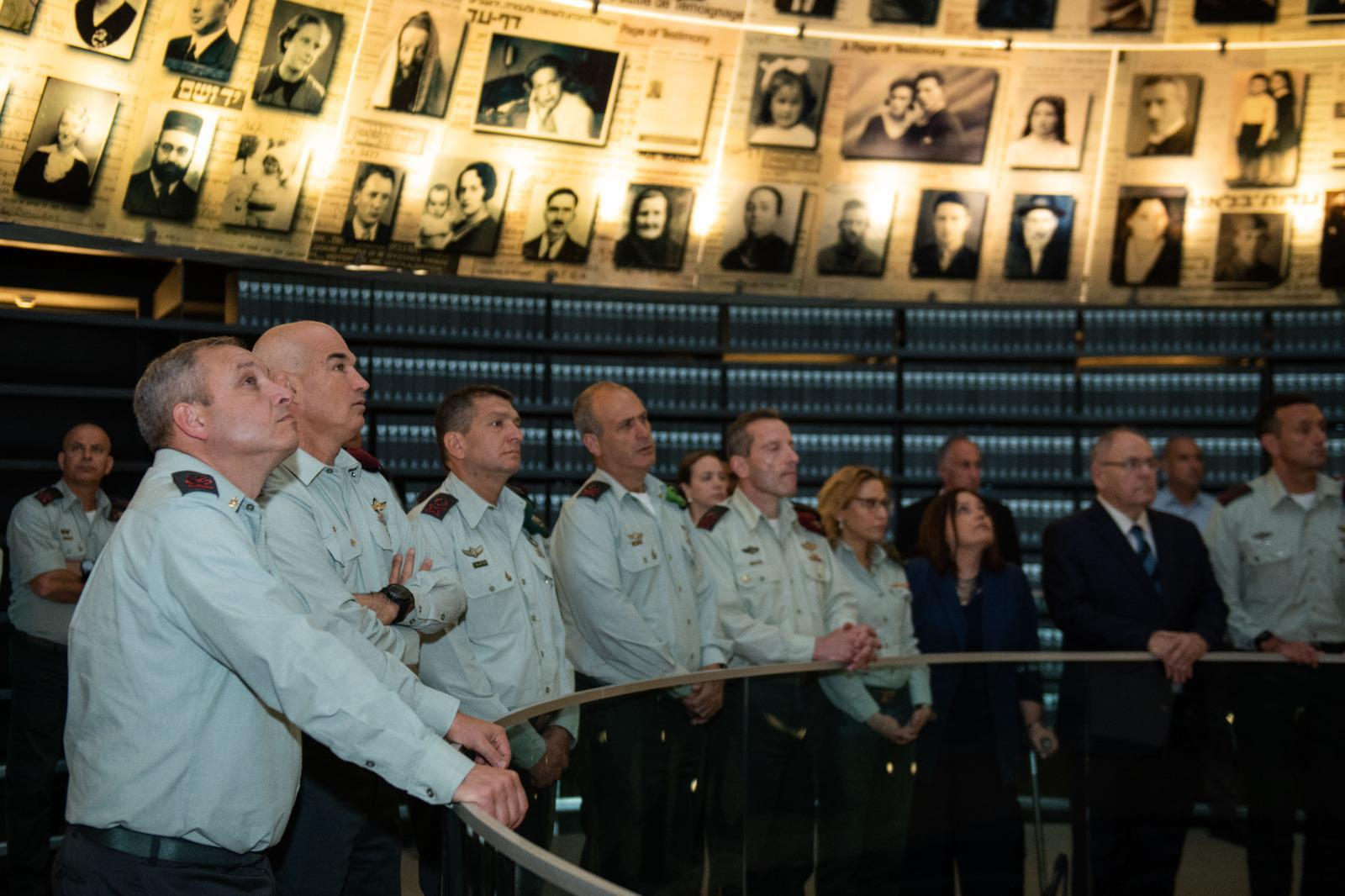
IDF General Staff, including Ghassan Alian and Aharon Haliva, holding a seminar at Yad Vashem for Yom HaShoah in April 2023.

Ghassan Alian, Coordinator of Government Activities in the Territories, said: "There will be no electricity and no water [in Gaza], there will only be destruction. You wanted hell, you will get hell." Giora Eiland wrote, "Gaza will become a place where no human being can exist" and "Creating a severe humanitarian crisis in Gaza is a necessary means to achieving the goal." The Israeli scholar Omer Bartov noted that no Israeli politician nor anyone in the IDF denounced this statement.

Of Israel's bombing of Gaza, Israeli army spokesperson Daniel Hagari said, "while balancing accuracy with the scope of damage, right now we're focused on what causes maximum damage". Legal scholars interpreted this as intention to destroy Gaza.

The legal scholar Nimer Sultany highlights statements by Israeli army commanders leading ground operations in northern Gaza that call for depopulation and a "scorched earth" approach. Soldiers have echoed such sentiments on social media. Former Israeli defence minister Moshe Ya'alon said, "The path we are currently being led down involves conquering, annexing, and ethnic cleansing."

In comments published in August 2025, Aharon Haliva, the former head of Israel's Military Intelligence Directorate, said that 50 Palestinians should be killed for every Israeli killed on 7 October, "regardless of whether they are children or women", and called the killing of 50,000 Palestinians in Gaza "necessary and required so that future generations will say to them: you humiliated us and killed us, but that was the price".

=== Other Israeli officials ===
On 11 June 2024, the Israeli government's official Twitter account posted that "Gazan civilians participated in the horrific events of October 7", later citing a statement that "there are no innocent civilians there". David Roet, the Israeli ambassador to Austria, stated during a 2025 meeting with Jewish leaders that it was "not correct" that there were innocent people in Gaza, and commented that Israel would simply destroy Gaza a second time if it was reconstructed. Moshe Feiglin, the leader of the Zehut political party, said: "There is one and only solution, which is to completely destroy Gaza before invading it." In May 2025, Feiglin said, "every child, every baby in Gaza is an enemy".

During an LBC interview in January 2024, Tzipi Hotovely, Israel's ambassador to the United Kingdom, called Gaza City a "horrible terror city" and advocated the bombing of "every school, every mosque, every second house" in Gaza. When host Iain Dale objected that she was calling for the destruction of all of Gaza, Hotovely responded that this was the only solution.

== Israeli conduct exceeding military objectives ==
Genocidal intent is also evidenced by the scale and systematic nature of actions that exceed any legitimate military objective — including the extensive targeting of children, widespread sexual violence, the destruction of cultural heritage, and the imposition of life-destroying conditions — together with the persistence of these practices despite full awareness of their catastrophic effects.

Genocide studies scholar, Shmuel Lederman suggests that the determination of genocidal intent include "the foreseeable consequences of a given policy" which considers the "structural nature of genocidal dynamics", rather than attempting to determine the "obscure mental states" of those engaged in genocide. Professor John B. Quigley argues that the living conditions the war has inflicted on Gaza could be used as proof of genocidal intent in the absence of direct evidence, as they are so destructive that Israel should have known they would result in the extermination of Palestinians in Gaza. President of the International Association of Genocide Scholars, Melanie O'Brien said that, in addition to statements by Israeli leaders, "patterns of conduct" such as large-scale loss of life, mass bombings, and aid blockade show intent.

Professor Maryam Jamshidi enumerates eight reasons that they contend make it more likely that the ICJ will rule in South Africa's favor: numerous genocidal statements made by high-ranking Israeli officials, the volume of direct evidence of Israel’s actions, expert analyses of genocide accusations against Israel, including from the UN, high civilian casualties and mass starvation caused by Israel’s actions, large scale forced displacement and ethnic cleansing, the long-term pattern of Israeli conduct towards Palestinians contributing to an inference of genocidal intent since 7 October, the possibility that ICJ's genocide jurisprudence may shift in a more victim-friendly direction before the case is decided and the relative weaknesses of Israel’s counter-arguments. She also argues that genocidal intent can be demonstrated when evidence shows that eliminating a protected group's civilian, intellectual, cultural, religious, military, and law enforcement leadership is intended to leave the rest of the group more vulnerable to unlawful abuses like forced migration. In September 2025, David Simon, director of the Genocide Studies Program at Yale University, said there had been a surge in use of the word "genocide" in relation to Gaza, and that the "man-made famine" in Gaza had made it easier for people to read genocidal intent from Israel's actions. Jeffrey S. Bachman and Esther Brito Ruiz also highlight the use of starvation on the population of Gaza as definitive evidence of Israel perpetrating a genocide.

The Lemkin Institute for Genocide Prevention states that Israel's deliberate destruction of cemeteries in Gaza is a crime indicative of genocidal intent "because of its erasure of a people's ancestors and therefore of their historical presence," adding that "intentional murder and forced displacement of all Palestinians from their ancestral homes...has been going on since Israel's founding, but sped up significantly first after Netanyahu assumed power in 2022 and again after October 7, 2023."

Genocide Watch states that genocidal intent may be established either through a "systematic pattern" of acts listed in the Genocide Convention, and—contrary to common misconception—the Convention requires only an intent to destroy "part of a people." However, Genocide Watch founder Gregory Stanton states that ICJ precedent suggests that genocide must be the "only intent" to warrant a conviction which could allow Israel to argue additional aims such as "defeating Hamas," thereby complicating proof of exclusive genocidal intent.

=== Extensive targeting of children ===
Genocidal intent is also evidenced by the extensive targeting of children.

The UN Commission of Inquiry reports cases where Israeli forces directly targeted children, including during evacuations, at shelters, and at humanitarian supply distribution sites; in some cases unarmed toddlers were shot in the head by snipers.

Multiple sources have highlighted how the targeting of children was instrumental in the ICJ case which charged Myanmar with genocidal intent, drawing parallels with Israel's conduct. Raz Segal stated "Israel’s figures far exceed those in the Rohingya case, further strengthening the argument." The IAGS said that Israel's destruction and injury of more than 50,000 children may constitute genocide, and linked this to a joint ICJ intervention in Rohingya genocide case by Canada, Denmark, France, Germany, the Netherlands, and the United Kingdom, which stressed that "children form a substantial part of the groups protected by the Genocide Convention" and that "the targeting of children provides an indication of the intention to destroy a group," since "physical destruction…is assured where it is unable to regenerate itself."

Nimer Sultany adds that "it follows that if these six western states were to deny that Israel has committed a genocide, they would exhibit double standards...[and]...Israel's invocation of security pretexts is not credible because, as these states stipulate, targeting children on this scale is 'likely to preclude a defense that members of a protected group were targeted solely for certain other reasons, such as that they posed a security threat.'

== Israeli media ==
In 2023, a group of over 55 scholars in genocide studies stated that there was widespread incitement to genocide in Israeli media since October 7, including calls to turn Gaza "into a slaughterhouse", "violate all norms on the way to victory" and "let there be a million bodies" of dead Palestinians. Elad Barashi, a TV producer affiliated with Channel 14, in a deleted post on X, formerly Twitter, wrote "Gaza deserves death. The 2.6 million terrorists in Gaza deserve death! … Men, women, and children – in every way possible, we must simply carry out a Holocaust on them". According to B'Tselem, incitement and dehumanisation play a role in the genocide. Dehumanisation of Palestinians has been a long-term issue in Israel, with the Israeli media contributing to it. Ayala Panievsky, a researcher at Molad, compared Israel's Channel 14 to Radio Rwanda and believed they should be tried for incitement to genocide.

== Potential motive ==
Many see the Gaza genocide as a consequence of Zionism and a continuation of the over 75 years of violence since the Nakba, in which Palestinians were killed and dispossessed to establish the State of Israel in Palestine.

Alongside but separate to intent is potential motive. The Israeli government has said that the military actions it has undertaken are in response to the October 7 attacks and sought to destroy Hamas and overthrow its governance of the Gaza Strip, while denying that their military operations constitute genocide. Multiple commentators argue that part of the motive is retaliation for the October 7 attacks. Nimer Sultany argues that anti-Palestinianism is in part the motive, while historian Mark Levene points to Zionism. Multiple genocide scholars argue that settler colonialism is an important motive. Raz Segal and B'Tselem also highlight the increasing idea of Jewish supremacy in Israeli politics, while reports by Albanese and Amos Goldberg highlight the project of Greater Israel.

== Statements by American officials ==
=== U.S. congressmen and senators ===
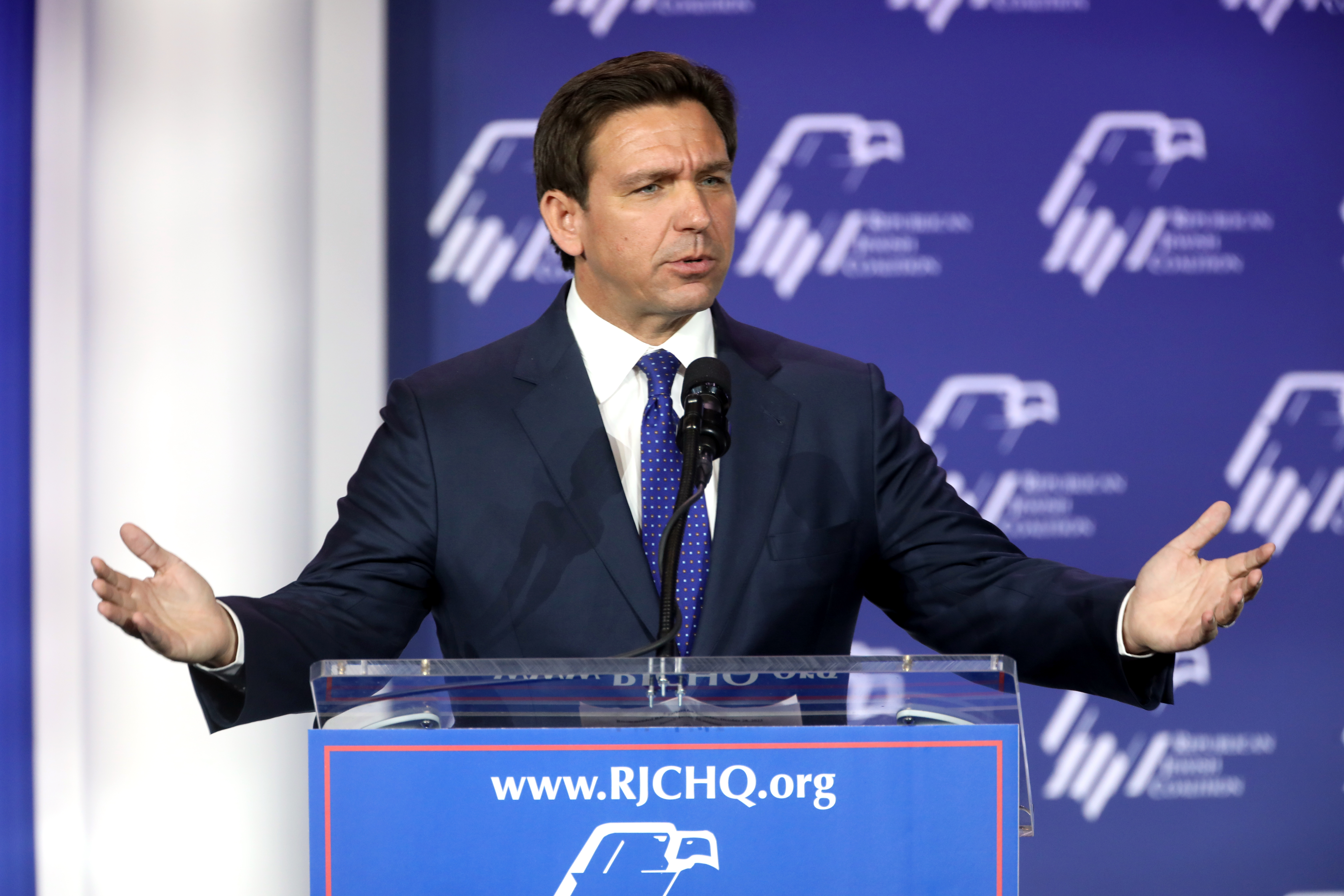
Governor Ron DeSantis speaking with attendees at the Republican Jewish Coalition's Annual Leadership Summit in Nevada, October 2023.

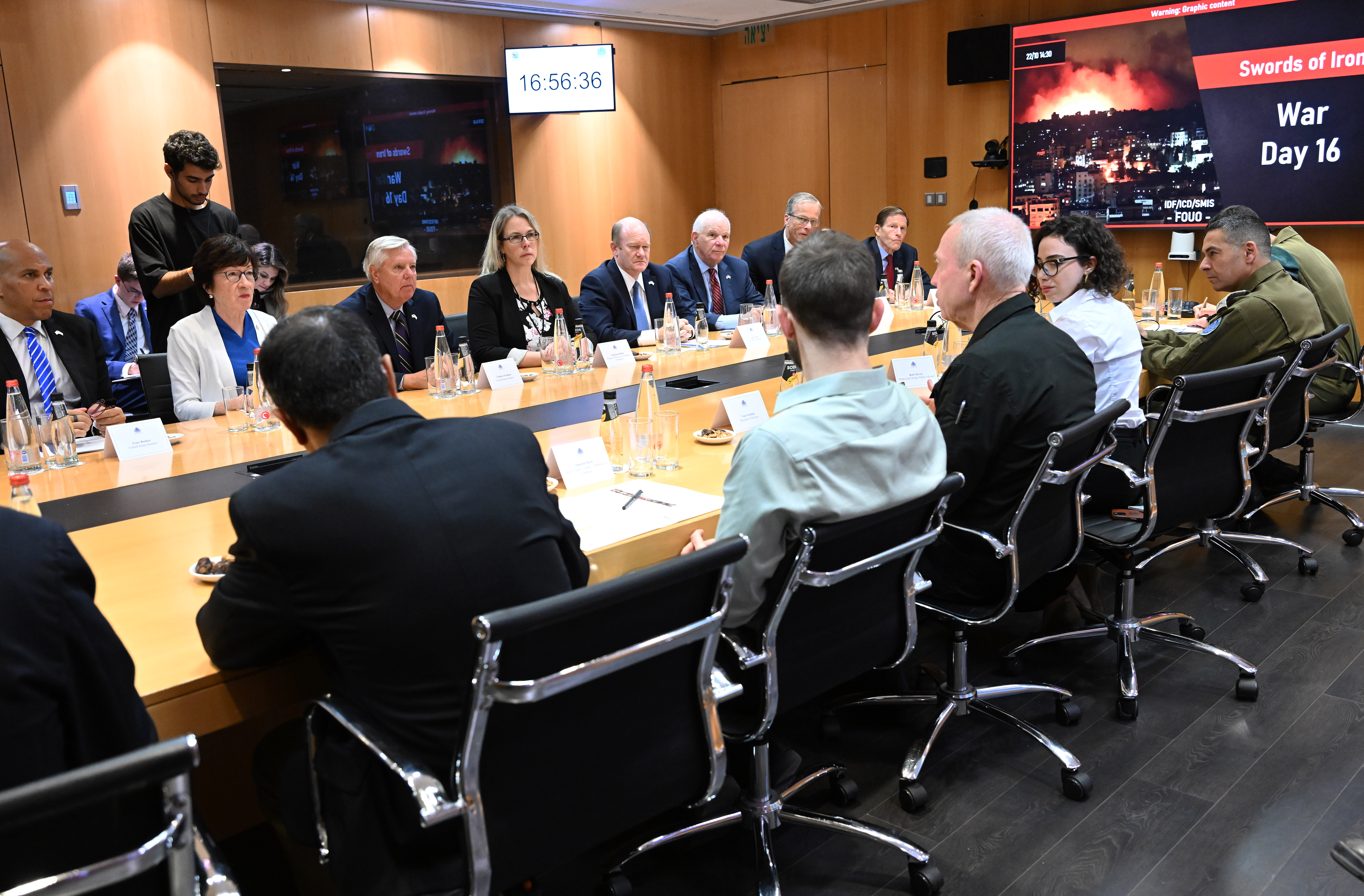
Bipartisan congressional delegation to Israel, October 2023

In the Florida legislature, Democratic Representative Angie Nixon, supporting a ceasefire resolution early in the Gaza war, highlighted the high death toll of Palestinians questioning how many had to die before a ceasefire was called for: (Note: Around 10,000 Palestinians had been reported dead at the time of the debate.) Republican Representative Michelle Salzman replied instantly "All of them". Salzman's remark, perceived as a call for genocide, led to calls for censure or resignation from Nixon and the Florida chapter of the Council on American-Islamic Relations (CAIR) called for her to be censured or to resign. CAIR-Florida Executive Director Imam Abdullah Jaber said in a statement: "This chilling call for genocide by an American lawmaker is the direct result of decades of dehumanization of the Palestinian people by advocates of Israeli apartheid and their eager enablers in government and the media."

Republican US congressman Max Miller, on Fox News, stated that Palestine is "about to get eviscerated ... to turn that into a parking lot." He said there should be "no rules of engagement" during Israel's bombardment of Gaza. Miller also questioned the accuracy of the Gaza Health Ministry's claim that 10,000 people have been killed in Gaza, saying that he believes many of those killed have been "Hamas terrorists" and not innocent civilians.

Republican U.S. representative Brian Mast compared Palestinians to citizens of Nazi Germany in November 2023 on the House floor, stating "I don't think we would so lightly throw around the term 'innocent Nazi civilians' during World War II. It is not a far stretch to say there are very few innocent Palestinian civilians." On January 31, 2024, Mast made remarks during a confrontation with Code Pink activists regarding the war in Gaza. When asked about images of Palestinian babies killed in Israeli attacks, he responded, "These are not innocent Palestinian civilians." During the exchange, Mast also stated, "It would be better if you kill all the terrorists and kill everyone who are supporters", and said that "there's more infrastructure that needs to be destroyed" in Gaza. Republican Tennessee representative Andy Ogles said "I think we should kill them all." Arkansas senator Tom Cotton remarked "As far as I'm concerned, Israel can bounce the rubble in Gaza." Michigan representative Tim Walberg said "We shouldn't be spending a dime on humanitarian aid. It [Gaza] should be like Nagasaki and Hiroshima. Get it over quick." South Carolina senator Lindsey Graham called the genocide a "religious war" and said he sides with Israel, calling on it to do "whatever the hell you have to do to defend yourself; level the place."

Florida representative Randy Fine called for Gaza to be obliterated like Nagasaki and Hiroshima and made numerous statements endorsing genocide and starvation in Gaza, such as "There is no suffering adequate for these animals. May the streets of Gaza overflow with blood," "Release the hostages. Until then, starve away," "There is no starvation. Everything about the 'Palestinian' cause is a lie," and "Kill. Them. All. #NoMercy #BombsAway."

=== Others ===
Former presidential candidate in the 2024 Republican Party presidential primaries, Nikki Haley, wrote "finish them" on an Israeli bomb bound for Gaza.

Fox News commentator Jesse Watters claimed "This population in Palestine is hostile, it's uneducated. It's even more radicalized than they were at the beginning of this. I mean, now, they have no homes at all. They're even more hateful of the Israelis. And their birthrate is explosive."

== Denial and justification ==
The Israeli government denies that its operations constitute genocide. It states that the military actions it has undertaken are in response to the October 7 attacks and sought to destroy Hamas, overthrow its governance of the Gaza Strip, and free the hostages taken in the October 7 attacks.

Genocide Watch asserts that Israel employs twelve documented genocidal denialist tactics: falsely minimizing statistics on civilian deaths, attacking critics, dehumanization, attributing casualties to mistakes or ancient enmity, invoking legalistic defenses, and blaming victims.

Common denial rhetoric includes ad hominem attacks against critics of Israel's genocide, asserting that the accusations are motivated by antisemitism or support for Hamas. Other frequent claims include downplaying Israeli violence and the death toll in Gaza, justifying Israel's actions in terms of self-defense or international humanitarian law, and arguing that Israel's relationship to the Holocaust means it is incapable of perpetrating genocide. Historian Taner Akçam has found a high degree of similarity between Armenian genocide denial and Gaza genocide denial.

Israeli historian Raz Segal writes that prominent institutes which document the Holocaust, such as the United States Holocaust Memorial Museum and Shoah Foundation, start from the premise that the Holocaust is unique and Israel, viewed as a nation of Holocaust survivors, cannot commit another genocide. This has contributed to the "rationalization and legitimation of Israel's genocide in Gaza from the very beginning."

== Israeli public opinion ==
Israel is deteriorating horribly. The most important thing, and you mentioned it, is how unanimous it is. It's not only the right-wingers. You cannot even show some empathy to Gaza, to the suffering of Gaza, which Israel doesn't see at all. The average Israeli saw nothing [of what has unfolded in] Gaza. Only the soldiers there see it. The bravery, the sacrifice, the hostages and families, this is shown nonstop, but not a single image of the suffering of two million people in Gaza. I think it's the darkest time of Israel, maybe ever.

— Israeli author Gideon Levy, January 2024

The Lemkin Institute for Genocide Prevention states that "the vast majority of Israelis agree with...[Israel's] plan and clearly will support anything to see it realized – from apartheid to extermination."

A June 2025 poll by the Hebrew University of Jerusalem found that 64% of Israelis largely agreed with the statement "there are no innocent people in Gaza".

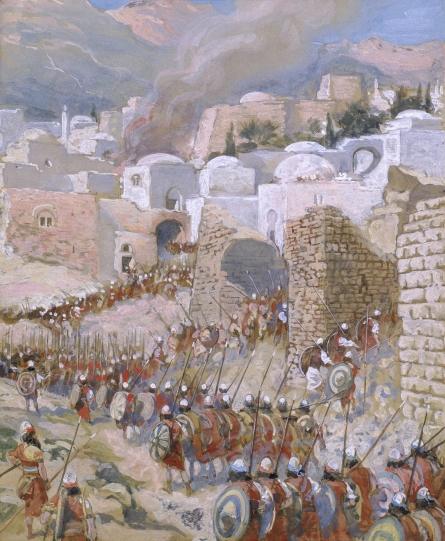
The Taking of Jericho, c. 1896–1902, by James Tissot.

A January 2024 Tel Aviv University poll of Israeli Jews found that 51% believed the IDF was using an appropriate amount of force in Gaza and 43% believed it was not using enough.

In a February 2024 Israel Democracy Institute survey of Israelis, 68% of Jewish respondents supported preventing all international aid from entering Gaza, (Note: Broken down by political identity: 39% among left-wing Jewish Israelis; 51.5% among centrist Jewish Israelis; 80% among right-wing Jewish Israelis) and 55% of Jewish respondents opposed ending the war.

A March 2025 poll of Israeli Jews found that 82% supported the forced expulsion of Gaza residents; 47% responded affirmatively to the question: "When conquering an enemy city, should the IDF act like the Israelites led by Joshua when they conquered Jericho, that is, kill all its inhabitants?" (Note: As detailed in the Book of Joshua, when the city of Jericho was conquered, the ancient Israelites "utterly destroyed all that was in the city, both man and woman, both young and old, and ox, and sheep, and ass, with the edge of the sword.") In July 2025, a poll conducted by the Viterbi Family Center for Public Opinion and Policy Research at the Israel Democracy Institute poll found that 79% of Israeli Jews were "not so troubled" or "not troubled at all" by reports of famine and suffering in Gaza.

An August 2025 poll conducted by aChord, a research group from the Hebrew University of Jerusalem, found that 76% of Israeli Jews agree or partially agree that "there are no innocents in Gaza".

== See also ==
- Academic and legal responses to the Gaza genocide
- Cultural discourse about the Gaza genocide

== Bibliography ==
- Abdo, Nahla (13 May 2024). "Israel's settler colonialism and the genocide in Gaza: Alternatives". Studies in Political Economy. 105 (1): 94–106. doi:10.1080/07078552.2024.2325298.
- Abraham, Yuval (3 April 2024). "'Lavender': The AI machine directing Israel's bombing spree in Gaza". +972 Magazine. Archived from the original on 10 October 2024.
- Adhikari, Mohamed; Carmichael, Cathie; Jones, Adam; Kapila, Shruti; Naimark, Norman; Weitz, Eric D. (2018). "Genocide and Global and/or World History: Reflections". Journal of Genocide Research. 20 (1): 134–153. doi:10.1080/14623528.2017.1363476.
- Albanese, Francesca (25 March 2024). Anatomy of a Genocide: Report of the Special Rapporteur on the situation of human rights in the Palestinian territories occupied since 1967, Francesca Albanese (PDF) (Report). United Nations Special Rapporteur on the occupied Palestinian territories. Archived (PDF) from the original on 28 January 2025.
- Albanese, Francesca (1 October 2024). Report of the Special Rapporteur on the situation of human rights in the Palestinian territories occupied since 1967, Francesca Albanese: Genocide as colonial erasure (Report). United Nations Special Rapporteur on the occupied Palestinian territories. Archived from the original on 20 July 2025.
- 'You Feel Like You Are Subhuman': Israel's Genocide Against Palestinians In Gaza (PDF) (Report). Amnesty International. 4 December 2024. Archived (PDF) from the original on 5 December 2024.
- Antonio, Raymund (23 October 2023). "Civilians not a target: Envoy decries 'genocide' tag of Israel–Hamas war". Manila Bulletin. Archived from the original on 1 November 2023.
- Bachman, Jeffrey S.; Ruiz, Esther Brito (19 September 2025). "From East Timor to Gaza: How the United States Contributes to and Distances Itself from the Atrocities of Others (and How Genocide Studies Lets the United States Get Away with It)". Journal of Genocide Research (Roundtable: Gaza and Genocide Studies): 1–15. doi:10.1080/14623528.2025.2556592.
- Bartov, Omer (10 November 2023). "Opinion: What I Believe as a Historian of Genocide". The New York Times. ISSN 0362-4331. Archived from the original on 18 December 2023.
- Bishara, Marwan (12 October 2023). "Israel is manufacturing a case for genocide". Al Jazeera. Archived from the original on 20 November 2023.
- B'Tselem (July 2025). Our Genocide (PDF) (Report). Archived (PDF) from the original on 30 July 2025.
- Burga, Solcyré (13 November 2023). "Is What's Happening in Gaza a Genocide? Experts Weigh In". Time. Archived from the original on 25 November 2023.
- Bybelezer, Charles (3 November 2023). "Netanyahu writes to IDF soldiers ahead of Shabbat". Jewish News Syndicate. Archived from the original on 1 December 2024.
- Casciani, Dominic (16 May 2024). "Israel-Gaza: What did the ICJ ruling really say?". BBC News.
- Chacar, Henriette (10 November 2023). "Israel revises Hamas attack death toll to 'around 1,200'". Reuters. Archived from the original on 11 November 2023.
- Coghill, Arianna (11 January 2024). "As It Formally Accuses Israel of Genocide, South Africa Condemns Netanyahu's Amalek Reference". Mother Jones. Archived from the original on 22 January 2024.
- Di-Capua, Yoav (5 June 2024). "Genocidal Mirroring in Israel/Palestine". Journal of Genocide Research (Forum: Israel–Palestine: Atrocity Crimes and the Crisis of Holocaust and Genocide Studies): 1–15. doi:10.1080/14623528.2024.2361978.
- Docker, John (2012). "Instrumentalising the Holocaust: Israel, Settler-Colonialism, Genocide (Creating a Conversation Between Raphaël Lemkin and Ilan Pappé)". Holy Land Studies. 11 (1). Edinburgh University Press: 1–32. doi:10.3366/hls.2012.0027. ISSN 1474-9475.
- Eghbariah, Rabea (May 2024). "Toward Nakba as a Legal Concept". Columbia Law Review. 124 (4). Archived from the original on 17 March 2025.
- El-Affendi, Abdelwahab (18 January 2024). "The Futility of Genocide Studies After Gaza". Journal of Genocide Research (Forum: Israel–Palestine: Atrocity Crimes and the Crisis of Holocaust and Genocide Studies): 1–7. doi:10.1080/14623528.2024.2305525.
- Fassin, Didier (5 February 2024). "The Rhetoric of Denial: Contribution to an Archive of the Debate about Mass Violence in Gaza". Journal of Genocide Research (Forum: Israel–Palestine: Atrocity Crimes and the Crisis of Holocaust and Genocide Studies): 1–7. doi:10.1080/14623528.2024.2308941.
- Gessen, Masha (7 February 2024). "The Limits of Accusing Israel of Genocide". The New Yorker. Archived from the original on 7 February 2024.
- Goda, Norman J. W. (February 2025). "The Genocide Libel: How the World Has Charged Israel with Genocide". Research Paper Series. 2025 (3). Institute for the Study of Contemporary Antisemitism. Archived from the original on 6 March 2025.
- Goldberg, Amos (15 October 2024). "The Problematic Return of Intent". Journal of Genocide Research (Forum: Israel-Palestine: Atrocity Crimes and the Crisis of Holocaust and Genocide Studies): 1–10. doi:10.1080/14623528.2024.2413175.
- Gurmendi Dunkelberg, Alonso (22 January 2025). "How to Hide a Genocide: Modern/Colonial International Law and the Construction of Impunity". Journal of Genocide Research (Forum: Israel-Palestine: Atrocity Crimes and the Crisis of Holocaust and Genocide Studies): 1–24. doi:10.1080/14623528.2025.2454739.
- Jamshidi, Maryam (6 May 2024). "Genocide and Resistance in Palestine under Law's Shadow". Journal of Genocide Research (Forum: Gaza: International Humanitarian Law and Genocide): 1–35. doi:10.1080/14623528.2024.2348377.
- Jones, Owen (13 January 2024). "The brutality and inhumanity of Israel's assault on Gaza is no surprise. It's just what was promised". The Guardian. Archived from the original on 22 January 2024.
- Khalidi, Rashid (11 April 2024). "'A new abyss': Gaza and the hundred years' war on Palestine". The Guardian. ISSN 0261-3077.
- Khan, Mishal S.; Tinua, Alu Tacon (16 February 2024). "Israel–Palestine: dehumanisation and silencing". The Lancet. 403 (10429): 805–806. doi:10.1016/S0140-6736(24)00043-6. PMID 38373433.
- Khoury, Nadim (2018). "Holocaust/Nakba and the Counterpublic of Memory". In Bashir, Bashir; Goldberg, Amos (eds.). The Holocaust and the Nakba: A New Grammar of Trauma and History. Columbia University Press. pp. 114–131. ISBN 978-0-231-54448-1.
- Kulkarni, Pavan (18 December 2023). "It is clear that Israel is committing genocide in Gaza, UN-Panel concludes". Peoples Dispatch. Archived from the original on 13 August 2025.
- Lakhani, Nina (5 March 2024). "UN experts condemn Israeli 'massacre' of Palestinians collecting flour". The Guardian. ISSN 0261-3077. Archived from the original on 3 December 2024.
- Lederman, Shmuel (29 January 2024). "Gaza as a Laboratory 2.0". Journal of Genocide Research (Forum: Israel-Palestine: Atrocity Crimes and the Crisis of Holocaust and Genocide Studies): 1–6. doi:10.1080/14623528.2024.2309706.
- ——— (19 September 2025). "A Not So Textbook Case of Genocide". Journal of Genocide Research (Roundtable: Gaza and Genocide Studies): 1–12. doi:10.1080/14623528.2025.2556550. ISSN 1462-3528.
- Lendman, Steve (2010). "Israel's Slow-Motion Genocide in Occupied Palestine". In Cook, William (ed.). The Plight of the Palestinians. Palgrave Macmillan. pp. 29–38. doi:10.1057/9780230107922_2. ISBN 978-1-349-28656-0. Archived from the original on 12 October 2023.
- Levene, Mark (21 January 2024). "Gaza 2023: Words Matter, Lives Matter More". Journal of Genocide Research (Forum: Israel–Palestine: Atrocity Crimes and the Crisis of Holocaust and Genocide Studies): 1–7. doi:10.1080/14623528.2024.2301866. eISSN 1469-9494. Archived (PDF) from the original on 4 July 2024.
- Mackenzie, James; Lubell, Maayan (29 October 2023). "Israel launches Gaza war's second phase with ground operation, Netanyahu says". Reuters.
- Marin, Siobhan; West, Andrew (30 January 2024). "Why a biblical story is central to South Africa's ICJ case against Israel". ABC News. Archived from the original on 9 December 2024.
- Mraffko, Clothilde (9 March 2024). "Gaza: New accounts of the 'flour massacre'". Le Monde. Archived from the original on 26 November 2024.
- Narea, Nicole; Samuel, Sigal (13 November 2023). "How to think through allegations of genocide in Gaza". Vox. Archived from the original on 24 November 2023.
- Narea, Nicole (25 October 2024). "Is Israel committing genocide? Reexamining the question, a year later". Vox.
- Netanyahu, Benjamin (3 November 2023). "Letter from PM Netanyahu to Our Soldiers and Commanders in the Swords of Iron War". www.gov.il.
- Nichols, Michelle (11 October 2023). "Palestinian UN envoy accuses Israel of 'genocidal' campaign against Gaza". Reuters. Archived from the original on 14 November 2023.
- Nijim, Mohammed (2020). Genocide in Gaza: Physical destruction and beyond (MA). University of Manitoba. Archived from the original on 26 January 2024.
- Nijim, Mohammed (2023). "Genocide in Palestine: Gaza as a case study". The International Journal of Human Rights. 27 (1): 165–200. doi:10.1080/13642987.2022.2065261. eISSN 1744-053X. ISSN 1364-2987. S2CID 248334822. Archived from the original on 16 October 2023.
- Polglase, Katie; Mahmood, Zahid; Mezzofiore, Gianluca (9 April 2024). "Dying for a bag of flour: Videos and eyewitness accounts cast doubt on Israel's timeline of deadly Gaza aid delivery". CNN. Archived from the original on 16 December 2024.
- "Public Statement: Scholars Warn of Potential Genocide in Gaza". Third World Approaches to International Law Review (Press release). 20 October 2023 [Statement released 15 October 2023]. Archived from the original on 23 November 2023.
- Quigley, John B. (14 March 2024). "Legal Standard for Genocide Intent: An Uphill Climb for Israel in Gaza Suit". EJIL: Talk!. European Journal of International Law. Archived from the original on 13 April 2024.
- Radnofsky, Caroline; Almendral, Aurora; Sackur, Leila (14 March 2024). "How did 118 people die in Gaza's Al-Rashid aid convoy violence?". NBC News. Archived from the original on 16 March 2025.
- Rashed, Haifa; Short, Damien (2012). "Genocide and settler colonialism: can a Lemkin-inspired genocide perspective aid our understanding of the Palestinian situation?". The International Journal of Human Rights. 16 (8): 1142–1169. doi:10.1080/13642987.2012.735494. S2CID 145422458.
- Rashed, Haifa; Short, Damien; Docker, John (2014). "Nakba Memoricide: Genocide Studies and the Zionist/Israeli Genocide of Palestine". Holy Land Studies. 13 (1). Edinburgh University Press: 1–23. doi:10.3366/hls.2014.0076. ISSN 1474-9475.
- Saldívar, Martha Vanessa (December 2010). "From Mexico to Palestine: An Occupation of Knowledge, a Mestizaje of Methods". American Quarterly. 62 (4). Johns Hopkins University Press: 821–833. doi:10.1353/aq.2010.a409338. S2CID 145324721.
- Samudzi, Zoé (18 January 2024). ""We are Fighting Nazis": Genocidal Fashionings of Gaza(ns) After 7 October". Journal of Genocide Research (Forum: Israel-Palestine: Atrocity Crimes and the Crisis of Holocaust and Genocide Studies): 1–9. doi:10.1080/14623528.2024.2305524.
- Samudzi, Zoé (18 September 2025). "Echolalias of Famine: Gaza after Biafra". Journal of Genocide Research (Roundtable: Gaza and Genocide Studies): 1–17. doi:10.1080/14623528.2025.2556569. ISSN 1462-3528.
- Segal, Raz (9 December 2023). "Statement of Scholars in Holocaust and Genocide Studies on Mass Violence in Israel and Palestine since 7 October". Contending Modernities. Archived from the original on 16 September 2025.
- Segal, Raz (2025). "Israeli Settler Colonial Genocide". The Journal of Imperial and Commonwealth History. 53: 182–191. doi:10.1080/03086534.2025.2467876.
- Segal, Raz (19 September 2025). "Introduction: Genocide Studies – Coming to Terms with Failure". Journal of Genocide Research (Roundtable: Gaza and Genocide Studies): 1–11. doi:10.1080/14623528.2025.2557712.
- Segal, Raz; Daniele, Luigi (5 March 2024). "Gaza as Twilight of Israel Exceptionalism: Holocaust and Genocide Studies from Unprecedented Crisis to Unprecedented Change". Journal of Genocide Research (Forum: Israel–Palestine: Atrocity Crimes and the Crisis of Holocaust and Genocide Studies): 1–10. doi:10.1080/14623528.2024.2325804.
- Semerdjian, Elyse (24 January 2024). "A World Without Civilians". Journal of Genocide Research (Forum: Israel–Palestine: Atrocity Crimes and the Crisis of Holocaust and Genocide Studies): 1–6. doi:10.1080/14623528.2024.2306714.
- Sharon, Jeremy (29 January 2024). "Cabinet members call to resettle Gaza, encourage Gazans to leave, at jubilant conference". Times of Israel. Archived from the original on 31 January 2024.
- Shatz, Omer (6 December 2024). Communication to the Prosecutor of the International Criminal Court: Incitement to Genocide in Gaza (PDF) (Report). The Hague. ICC-01/18. Archived (PDF) from the original on 20 October 2025.
- Shaw, Martin (2013). "Palestine and Genocide: An International Historical Perspective Revisited". Holy Land Studies. 12 (1). Edinburgh University Press: 1–7. doi:10.3366/hls.2013.0056.
- Shaw, Martin (3 January 2024). "Inescapably Genocidal". Journal of Genocide Research (Forum: Israel–Palestine: Atrocity Crimes and the Crisis of Holocaust and Genocide Studies): 1–5. doi:10.1080/14623528.2023.2300555. S2CID 266778978.
- Short, Damien (2016). Redefining Genocide: Settler Colonialism, Social Death and Ecocide. Bloomsbury Publishing. ISBN 978-1-84813-546-8.
- Shpigel, Noa (3 January 2025). "Israeli Lawmakers Call on Military to Destroy Food, Water and Power Sources in Gaza". Haaretz.
- Smith, Mitch; McCarthy, Lauren; Londoño, Ernesto; Jordan, Miriam (12 October 2023). "Palestinian Americans, Dismayed by Violence, Say Historical Context Is Being Overlooked". The New York Times. ISSN 0190-8286. Archived from the original on 12 November 2023.
- Sorek, Tamir (6 February 2025). "Mainstreaming a Genocidal Imagination in Israeli Society: Settler-Colonialism, Settler Anxiety, and Biblical Cues". Journal of Genocide Research (Forum: Israel-Palestine: Atrocity Crimes and the Crisis of Holocaust and Genocide Studies): 1–24. doi:10.1080/14623528.2025.2456321.
- Sultany, Nimer (9 May 2024). "A Threshold Crossed: On Genocidal Intent and the Duty to Prevent Genocide in Palestine". Journal of Genocide Research (Forum: Gaza: International Humanitarian Law and Genocide): 1–26. doi:10.1080/14623528.2024.2351261.
- Tlaib, Rashida (15 May 2025). "H.Res.409 – 119th Congress (2025–2026): Recognizing the ongoing Nakba and Palestinian refugees' rights". www.congress.gov.
- United Nations Independent International Commission of Inquiry on the Occupied Palestinian Territory and Israel (16 September 2025). Legal analysis of the conduct of Israel in Gaza pursuant to the Convention on the Prevention and Punishment of the Crime of Genocide (PDF). OHCHR (Report). Archived (PDF) from the original on 16 September 2025.
- Üngör, Uğur Ümit (26 January 2024). "Screaming, Silence, and Mass Violence in Israel/Palestine". Journal of Genocide Research (Forum: Israel–Palestine: Atrocity Crimes and the Crisis of Holocaust and Genocide Studies): 1–9. doi:10.1080/14623528.2024.2309709. hdl:20.500.11755/180f1365-bc31-44c0-95d9-02528077c91e.
- "Israel's illegal occupation of Palestinian territory, tantamount to 'settler-colonialism': UN expert". UN News. United Nations. 27 October 2022. Archived from the original on 28 October 2022.
- Usher, Graham (2006). "The wall and the dismemberment of Palestine". Race & Class. 47 (3). SAGE Publications: 9–30. doi:10.1177/0306396806061084. S2CID 144318760.
- Al-Waheidi, Majd (25 September 2025). "A question of intent: Is what's happening in Gaza genocide?". NPR. Archived from the original on 11 October 2025.
