= Mehrdad Raissi Ardali =

Iranian voice actor (born 1975)

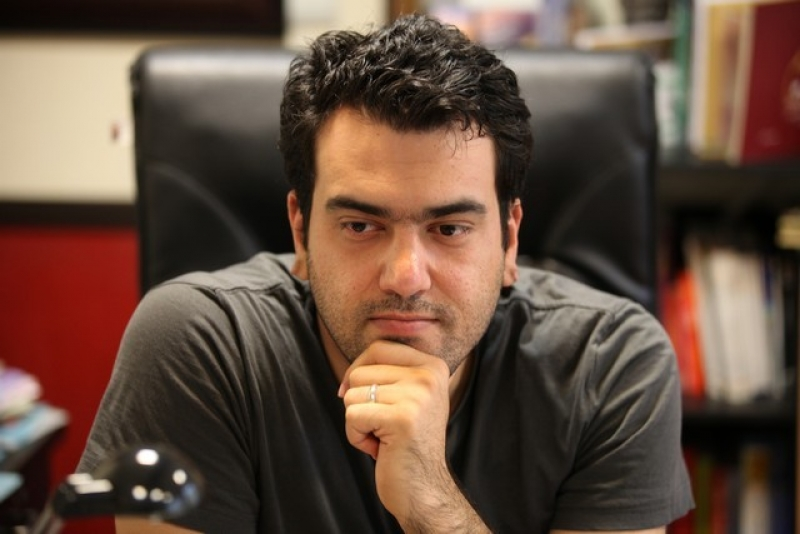
- Born: Mehran Gill; 17 October 1975 (age 51); Tehran, Iran
- Citizenship: United States, San Diego
- Education: University of Science and Culture (Software Engineering)
- Occupations: voice actor, voice acting director, CEO of Glory Entertainment
- Years active: 2003–present
- Spouse: Nasim Nezhad Azar
- Children: 2 (Glory & Lily)
- Mehrdad Raissi's voice One of Mehrdad Raissi's voices

Mehrdad Raissi Ardali (Persian: مهرداد رئیسی اردلی) Real name: Mehran Gill, born 17 October 1975) is a prolific Iranian voice actor, dubbing director, founder, director, CEO and Quality Control Manager of Glory Entertainment (The Association of Tehran Young Voice Actors). He has also provided Persian voices for several animation characters, including famous characters such as Donkey in Shrek, Marty in Madagascar, Madagascar: Escape 2 Africa and Madagascar 3: Europe's Most Wanted, Buck in Ice Age: Dawn of the Dinosaurs, Bolt in Bolt, Carl Fredricksen in Up, Flynn Rider in Tangled, The Once-ler in The Lorax, RJ in Over the Hedge, Francesco Bernoulli in Cars 2, Mr. Ping in Kung Fu Panda, Ramon in Happy Feet 2, The Man in the Yellow Hat in Curious George, Raoul in A Monster in Paris, Kevin in Ben 10 Ultimate Alien: Cosmic Destruction, Barry in Bee Movie, Bunnymund in Rise of the Guardians, Guy in The Croods and Kristoff in Frozen.

== Education and career ==
Mehrdad Raissi studied computer software engineering at University of Science and Culture in Tehran. He started dubbing animations and movies in 2003. Different channels of Islamic Republic of Iran Broadcasting, i.e. Channel 2, Namayesh, Pouya Cartoon Channel, home video companies having the Ministry of Culture and Islamic Guidance permit, directors, domestic and foreign animation producers, the UN and Radio Javan have broadcast his works. Mehrdad Raissi has received certificates of appreciation from IRIB TV5, the 16th Festival of the Capital Cities of Iran's Provinces' TV-Radio Products and the UN - WFP.

In 2006 he published the first professional dubbing periodical called Dubbing in Iran which provided information on dubbing. He has also directed a 15-episode program called The Eighth Art – each episode 40 minutes long – which was created for IRIB TV5 and was about dubbing and voice acting. Mehrdad Raissi has equipped the Association of Tehran Young Voice Actors with 10 digital recording studios. He has been holding regular voice acting auditions for animations/movies since 2003 and has trained more than 380 up-and-coming voice actors. Mehrdad Raissi has also been auditioning journalists for animation voice acting for free since 2006.

In 2010, during a formal ceremony, he paid tribute to Ali Kassmaei and Arshak Ghokasian, pioneers in dubbing in Iran, and named two of the studios of the Association of Tehran Young Voice Actors after them.

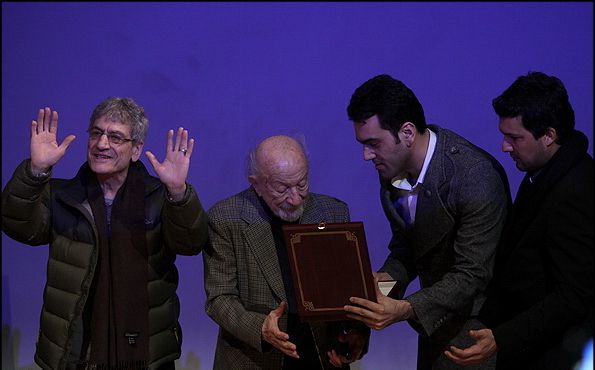
Mehrdad Raissi paying tribute to Ali Kassmaei, known as the father of Persian voice acting, in Tehran, 2010 - From left to right: Arshak Ghokasian, Ali Kassmaei, Mehrdad Raissi Ardali, Hamed Behdad

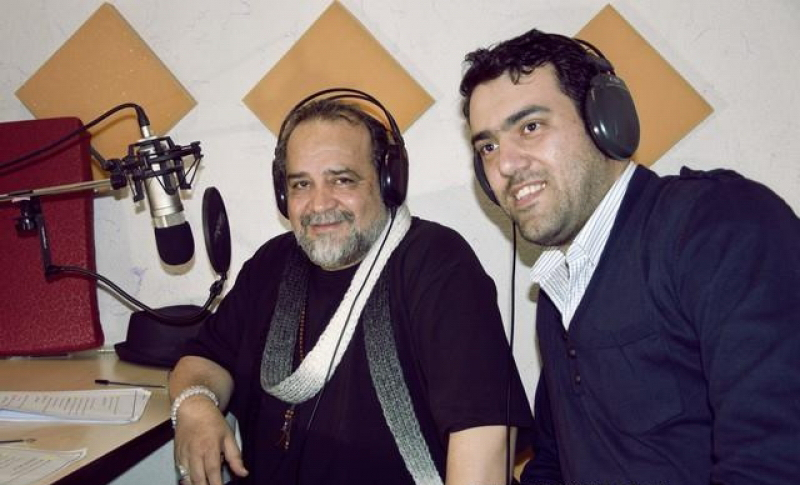
Mehrdad Raissi Ardali and Mohammad-Reza Sharifinia in one of the studios of Glory Entertainment working on Tehran 1500, 2011

In 2011, he published the first and only voice acting magazine called Sedapisheh in Iran as the head of the policy-making board. He holds the record for the highest selling dubbed animations in Iran. In 2011, he attended the Annecy International Animated Film Festival and met Carlos Saldanha and invited him to come to Iran to exchange information regarding animation making and voice acting. Mehrdad Raissi has written the Persian lyrics for a couple of renown musicals such as A Monster in Paris, Tangled, The Nightmare Before Christmas and Frozen. In 2012, he started an Internet radio station by the name of Voice of Glory which streams children's stories 24/7.

== Awards and honors ==
- Receive an appreciation certificate for the best voice actor from IRIB Tehran in 2006
- Receive an appreciation certificate from TDH institute, the Sony and Columbia pictures representative in Iran
- Receive an appreciation statuette from the second computer games festival
- Receive an appreciation certificate in the 16th festival of radio and television productions in provincial centers
- Receive an appreciation certificate from WPF in Iran due to cooperation in announcer affairs and dubbing

== Director of voice actors ==
He has also directed Iranian voice actors in several animated feature films such as:

- Finding Nemo
- Monsters, Inc.
- The Incredibles
- Shrek
- Shrek 2
- Shrek the Third
- Shrek Forever After
- Kung Fu Panda
- WALL-E
- Ice Age
- Ice Age: The Meltdown
- Ice Age: Dawn of the Dinosaurs
- Ice Age: Continental Drift
- Bolt
- Up
- Bee Movie
- The Lorax
- Rise of the Guardians
- Wreck-It Ralph
- Tangled
- Tehran 1500
- Simorgh's Heart
- Masouleh
- Mina va Palang
- Quest of Persia
- The Smurfs
- Mixed Nutz
- Cloudy with a Chance of Meatballs
- Corpse Bride
- Chicken Little
- The Princess and the Frog
- Everyone's Hero
- Wallace and Gromit: The Curse of the Were-Rabbit
- Meet the Robinsons
- The Nutcracker in 3D
- Spirit: Stallion of the Cimarron
- Curious George
- Monster House
- Mulan
- Mulan II
- The Polar Express
- Brother Bear
- Brother Bear 2
- Robots
- The Prince of Egypt
- Lion King 1 1/2
- Despicable Me
- Sinbad: Legend of the Seven Seas
- Antz
- Brave
- The Croods
- Monsters University
- Frozen

== Voice acting ==
Title	Character	Year
Lightyear	Buzz lightyear	2022
Luca	Ercole	2021
Storks	Junior	2016
Zootopia	Nick	2016
Big Hero 6	Tadashi	2014
Frozen	Kristoff	2013
Monsters University	Frank McCay	2013
The Croods	Guy	2013
Rise of the Guardians	Bunnymund	2012
Shrek Forever After	Donkey	2010
Tangled	Flynn Rider/Yujin	2010
Cloudy with a Chance of Meathballs	Brent and Flint's ringtone	2009
Up	Carl Fredricksen	2009
Horton Hears A who!	Mayor	2008
Kung Fu Panda	Mr. Ping, Grand Master Oogway	2008
Madagascar: Escape 2 Africa	Marty	2008
Bolt	Bolt	2008
Shrek the Third	Donkey	^{2007}
Ratatouille	Alfredo Linguini	2007
Bee Movie	Barry	^{2007}
TMNT (2007)	Casey Jones	^{2007}
A Scanner Darkly	Freck	^{2006}
Ice Age 2: The Meltdown	Fast Tony	2008
Over the Hedge	RJ	2006
Corpse Bride	Informer and the French waiter	2005
Madagascar	Marty	^{2005}
Robots	Herb	2005
ماجراهای یقنلی	Narrator	-
Shrek 2	Donkey	^{2004}
Mickey Mouse and Friends	Mickey Mouse	1994

== Director of voice actors in Tehran 1500 ==
Mehrdad Raissi has directed Iranian voice actors/actors Bahram Radan, Hedieh Tehrani, Mohammad Reza Sharifinia, Gohar Khayrandish, Habib Rezaei, Mahtab Nassirpour, Hessam Navvab Safavi and Mehran Modiri in Tehran 1500 which is the first Iranian animation feature directed by Bahram Azimi.

== TV show director ==
- The Eighth art (persian: هنر هشتم) TV show, 2007
- Tamashakhane, summer 2008
- Gaffe Show, winter 2017 and summer 2020
- Bekhandim Podcasts
- Joystick TV Show, 2018 and summer 2020
- Jackpot TV show, 2019

== See also ==
- Majid Habibi
- Ali Caszadeh Mataki
