= End of Innocence =

(The) End of Innocence may refer to:

== Television ==
- "End of Innocence" (Blue Heelers), an episode of Blue Heelers
- "The End of Innocence" (The O.C.), an episode of The O.C.
- "The End of Innocence", an episode of The Proud Family: Louder and Prouder
- "End of Innocence", an episode of Young Riders
- "The End of Innocence", an episode of "Survivor: Marquesas
- "The End of Innocence", an episode of season 5 of Highlander
- Gumrah: End of Innocence, an Indian television series

== Film ==
- End of Innocence (1957), by Leopoldo Torre Nilsson
- The End of Innocence (1990), by Dyan Cannon
- Warlock III: The End of Innocence, a direct-to-video film

== Music ==
- End of Innocence, a studio album by Tony Kaye (2021)
- End of Innocence (video), a music DVD by Nightwish
- "End of Innocence", a song by Iced Earth from Dystopia

== Literature ==
- The End of Innocence, a book by Estelle Blackburn
- The End of Innocence: Britain in the Time of AIDS, a book by Simon Garfield
- The End of Innocence: A Memoir, a 2003 memoir of Chastity Bono, now Chaz Bono

== Other uses ==
- Quest of Persia: The End of Innocence, a video game

== See also ==
- The End of the Innocence (disambiguation)
- An End to Innocence, a book by Leslie Fiedler
