= John Spencer (military officer) =

American military officer and researcher

- Alma mater: Georgetown University
- Military career
- Allegiance: United States
- Branch: United States Army; California State Guard
- Rank: Major (USA); Colonel (CSG)
- Commands: Urban Warfare Training, 40th Infantry Division
- Conflicts: Iraq War

John W. Spencer is a retired United States Army officer, researcher of urban warfare, and author. He currently serves as the chair of urban warfare studies at the Modern War Institute, codirector of the Urban Warfare Project, and host of the Urban Warfare Project Podcast at West Point. He is a founding member of the International Working Group on Subterranean Warfare.

He has commented on the Russian invasion of Ukraine. His comments on the Gaza war and Gaza genocide have been controversial.

== Military career ==
Spencer enlisted in the United States Army as a private, immediately after graduating from high school at the age of 17, eventually reaching the rank of Sergeant first class, until receiving commission; he retired from active service with the rank of major.

During his military career, he was infantry platoon leader and company commander, including two combat tours during the Iraq War. In Iraq, he served during the initial invasion in 2003 and later in 2008 during the Iraq War troop surge and the Battle of Sadr City. He was also assigned to Ranger School, Joint Chiefs of Staff, etc. Later he became a fellow with the chief of staff of the Strategic Studies Group, until he moved to Modern War Institute (MWI).

== Later work ==
Spencer is currently a chair of urban warfare studies at the MWI and a colonel in the California State Guard, where he is assigned as the director of urban warfare training with the 40th Infantry Division.

During the summer of 2022, while Russian invasion of Ukraine was still in progress, he visited Ukraine, "to study the battle of Kyiv."

During the Russian invasion of Ukraine in 2022, he started giving advice on "how to resist the Russian invasions" through Twitter. This culminated in him releasing "The Mini-Manual for the Urban Defender: A Guide to the Strategies and Tactics of Defending a City", which was translated into more than 10 languages.

He is also a contributing editor at War on the Rocks.

== Opinions on the Gaza war ==
=== Civilian to combatant casualty ratio ===
Spencer praised Israel's ratio of civilian casualties in Gaza as "historically low for modern warfare," citing IDF claims that 50-60% of Gazans killed were civilians and previous estimates of 80-90% of casualties in modern conflicts being civilians. Spencer's claims were echoed by Israeli Prime Minister Benjamin Netanyahu, and Gen. David A. Deptula, Dean of the Mitchell Institute for Aerospace Studies at the U.S. Air Force Academy.

However, Professor Michael Spagat of the University of London wrote in August 2025 that the statistics Spencer cites, and his conclusions, are both false. Spagat cites academic analysis showing that the idea that 80-90% of casualties in war are civilians is a myth. Spagat points out that the Uppsala Conflict Data Program database of wars (1989–2017) shows 42–55% of casualties are civilians in modern warfare; in urban warfare, 40–70% of casualties are civilians. Spagat also estimates that 80% of Gaza casualties are civilians, concluding that civilian casualties in Gaza are higher than the average for both urban warfare and modern warfare.

=== Israeli military practices ===
In February 2024, a foreign policy advisor of Benjamin Netanyahu paraphrased Spencer as having said that "Israel sets the gold standard in terms of preserving civilian lives". Spencer said the following month in a Newsweek article that "Israel has not created a gold standard in civilian harm mitigation in war. That [would imply] there is a standard in civilian casualties in war that is acceptable or not acceptable". Spencer further asserted that the IDF was "taking unique precautions [...] to protect the innocent", claimed that "Israel's critics [... did not] mention the efforts of the IDF to minimize civilian casualties", and opined that Israel set a "remarkable, historic new standard" in terms of civilian safety in war zones.

In December 2023, Spencer asserted that Israeli attacks on Gaza were "proportional, very discriminate, very precise". His comments were criticized by Wes J Bryant, a former JTAC in the United States Air Force who coordinated airstrikes against ISIS. He said IDF's deliberate and continued targeting within densely populated refugee camps showed its campaign was neither discriminate nor precise. In a January 2024 Newsweek article, Spencer argued of the 2023 Israeli invasion of the Gaza Strip that Israel "has taken more measures to avoid needless civilian harm than virtually any other nation that's fought an urban war". He states that the IDF issued warnings in northern Gaza to notify civilians to evacuate before attacks began; that the IDF calls and texts nearby civilians before an attack; and that the IDF employs "roof knocking," using a small, non-destructive munition on the roof of a structure to create a noise and warn civilians to flee before attacking it—and that these are practices that no military has ever implemented before. In the March 2024 article, Spencer stated that the Israeli military has created a "new standard" consisting of a multitude of precautionary measures it has implemented during its invasion of the Gaza Strip, including giving them days or weeks to evacuate.

Larry Lewis of the Center for Naval Analyses has criticized Spencer's positions. He argues that the IDF's order for 1 million Gazans to evacuate from northern Gaza to southern Gaza in 24 hours was deemed practically impossible by experts, and that Israel attacked civilians while they were evacuating and then again once the civilians were in southern Gaza. Lewis also questions the effectiveness of communication with cell phones, given widespread destruction of Gaza's infrastructure; and that interviews with Gazans after the 2014 war showed that the effectiveness of roof knocking was mixed due to confusion among civilians caused by Israel's tactics.

Law professor Maryam Jamshidi, citing legal experts and United Nations bodies, criticized the praise of Israel's "precautionary measures" by commentators (including John Spencer), arguing they often violate international law and can constitute war crimes, such as forcible transfer and collective punishment. She contends that "insufficient" or "unlawful" evacuation orders, including the directive for 1.1 million Palestinians to relocate, undercut claims that these measures demonstrate a lack of genocidal intent.

=== Gaza genocide ===
In December 2024, John Spencer co-authored an opinion piece with Arsen Ostrovsky in Newsweek criticizing Amnesty International's characterization of Israel's actions in Gaza as genocide, which they described as "no less than a blood libel." The article originally stated:

To demonstrate just how utterly ludicrous Amnesty's accusation of genocide is, one only needs to see that, according to the CIA World Factbook, the population in Gaza has actually increased 2 percent in the last year. This is the very opposite of seeking to destroy, in whole or in part or in any way, a group of people.

In October 2025, Newsweek removed this sentence, issuing a statement that read:

This article previously stated the CIA World FactBook claims the Gaza's population increased in 2024. That statement has been removed.

Separately, the AAP FactCheck team analyzed social media claims that Gaza's population had increased by 2 percent according to the CIA World Factbook and determined them to be false, noting that the figures were based on U.S. Census Bureau projections from August 2023, before the outbreak of conflict. In July 2024, the Palestinian Central Bureau of Statistics (PCBS) released a Gaza population growth rate for 2024 of about 1 percent.

== Publications ==
- Liam Collins and John Spencer, Understanding Urban Warfare (2022; ISBN 978-1912440351)
- John Spencer, Connected Soldiers: Life, Leadership, and Social Connections in Modern War (2022; ISBN 978-1640125124)
