= Orient: A Hero's Heritage =

Orient: A Hero’s Heritage (Known in Iran as Asre Pahlevanan or The Age of Pehlivans عصرِ پهلوانان) was a role-playing video game designed for the PC platform. The game was produced by the software company ODEC (Orient Digital Entertainment Company Ltd.) of Iran later called RAS Games. The game was the first RPG Style game released in the Islamic Republic of Iran. The dialogue was mainly in Persian. The game was cancelled due to lack of funding.

Orient: A Hero’s Heritage received intense media coverage in many Iranian publications, being the longest game ever created in Iran by the time of release. It was named the best Iranian game by emag. The developers sold the game on DVD within Iran.

== Gameplay ==
Orient: A Hero’s Heritage was a single-player, role-playing game in Persian language. It featured fast-paced magic and combat-heavy gameplay. The storyline included multiple alternative paths with different endings and numerous sub-quests.

The story of the game is based loosely on the history of ancient Persia, and the symbology of the Epic of the Kings, also known as Firdauwsi’s Shahnameh. It was also to touch on various epics on the ancient history of Assyria, Babylon, and Egypt, and offer a new take on all of the above.

One of the major role-playing features in the game was the possibility of a choice between the side of Light or that of the Darkness. The player would have met people, and befriend or fight with them depending on his alignment, which in turn would depend on his previous actions and even thoughts. For example, the player would have had to choose his path in his own mental realm upon hearing his inner voice. The gameplay would have seen the player advance in strength, agility, etc. in order to grow from an aspiring young prince to a renowned Pehlivan (hero) and magician.

== Storyline ==
This segment has directly been quoted with permission from the developer’s website.

The ancient dream of living eternal lives in a paradise has returned to haunt the people of Persia. Dark priests of the god Khashmoday are threatening to open the magical gateway to the realms of the elementals, opened by King Jamshid, which brought destruction and oblivion to Iran the first time, once again. This time it is not the elemental servants they are wishing to evoke, but the dark god of chaos himself. The only Ancient One who could possibly stop them has been slumbering for many millennia in a secret tomb. Amidst the political strife and haggling between the Priests, the King of Iran, The Dwarves and the Paries, the dark forces of the north have overrun the Northern provinces. Demons and beasts ravage the country, led by a mysterious arch-mage with two faces.

Atar, Pehlivan and prince of Sistan thought he had set out on a journey to discover his heritage and family, but he will soon find out that his past and future are closely tied to the battle that has long since started among the forces of good and evil, divinity and flesh. He will have to unite old enemies in order to save his people from a deep fall into chaos, and he will find very soon that sometimes evil can only be defeated by evil.

== See also ==
- Quest of Persia: The End of Innocence
- Quest of Persia: Lotfali Khan Zand
- Donya ye Bazi
