= Glory Entertainment =

Iranian dubbing organization

Glory Entertainment (The Association of Tehran Young Voice Actors)
- انجمن گویندگان جوان تهران
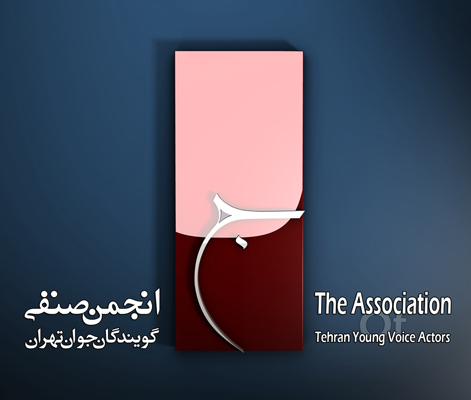
- Formation: 2005
- Headquarters: Tehran, Iran
- Location: Iran
- Services: Animation and Movie dubbing, Specialized dubbing training and making animation
- President: Mehrdad Raissi Ardali
- Key people: Mehrnaz Razeqi, Vice President
- Website: www.irdub.com

Glory Entertainment (also known as The Association of Tehran Young Voice Actors) (Persian: انجمن گویندگان جوان تهران) is an Iranian institute specializing in dubbing movies and primarily animated films and cartoons for the Persian-speaking audience. The association began operating officially on December 6, 2005, after acquiring official license and permit from the Ministry of Labour and Social Affairs and the Ministry of Culture and Islamic Guidance.

The association increased its range of activities since by dubbing works commissioned by the IRIB, local home-video companies, directors, local and foreign animation producers, the UN and Radio Javan.

== History ==
This association first began working with name Glory Entertainment and in 2003, and after registration in 2005, increased activity range and cooperated with broadcasting different channels, media institutions with license of Iran Ministry of Culture and Guidance, directors and Iranian and foreign animation producers, United Nations, and Radio Javan. They won certificate of appreciation from IRIB TV5 channel.

== Other activities ==
From Association of Tehran Young Voice Actors other works, is releasing Dubbing specialized publication with name dubbing. Also this association released voice actor publication since March 2012. Furthermore first Iranian children stories website and «Glorytoon» website for preparing dubbed works in June 2014 by this association.

== Dubbed works ==
Notable works dubbed by the association include the works of Walt Disney, Pixar, DreamWorks and studios alike.

- Winx Club 3D: Magical Adventure
- Encanto
- Luca
- Frozen
- Shrek (movie)
- Shrek 2
- Shrek the Third
- Shrek Forever After
- Hotel Transylvania
- Hotel Transylvania 2
- Hotel Transylvania 3
- Tangled
- Zootopia
- Big Hero 6
- Cloudy with a Chance of Meathballs
- Cloudy with a Chance of Meathballs 2
- Kung Fu Panda
- Kung Fu Panda 3
- Horton Hears a Who!
- Happy Feet
- Happy Feet Two
- Ben 10: Ultimate Alien
- Finding Nemo
- Valiant
- Ratatouille
- A Christmas Carol (2009)
- Cars
- Cars 2
- Monsters, Inc.
- Monsters University
- Corpse Bride
- The Nightmare Before Christmas
- Toy Story
- Toy Story 2
- Toy Story 3
- The Angry Birds Movie
- Storks
- Moana (movie)
- A Monster in Paris
- TMNT (film)
- Batman & Mr. Freeze: SubZero
- How to Train Your Dragons
- How to Train Your Dragons 2
- Megamind
- The Incredibles
- Osmosis Jones
- Ice Age
- Ice Age: The Meltdown
- Ice Age: Dawn of the Dinosaurs
- Ice Age: Continental Drift
- Ice Age: Collision Course
- The Ice Age Adventures of Buck Wild

== Glory Entertainment voice actors ==
- Mehrdad Raissi
- Mohammad Reza Solati
- Majid Habibi
- Hooman Haji Abdollahi
- Hooman Khayat
