= Shkarchi tank =

1996 video game

Shkarchi Tank
- Publisher: Hanafa Studio
- Platform: DOS
- Release: December 1996

Shkarchi Tank (Persian: شکارچی تانک, lit. 'Tank Hunter') is a video game for DOS, released by Hanafa Studio in December 1996.

Created by a video game studio linked to the Iranian government, the game is set during 1980-1988 Iran–Iraq War, with a simple gameplay in which the player hunts Iraqi tanks with a rocket launcher. It is regarded as the first or one of the earliest video games in Iran.
