= The End of the Innocence =

The End of the Innocence may refer to:

- The End of the Innocence (album), an album by Don Henley
- "The End of the Innocence" (song), a song by Don Henley
- "The End of the Innocence", an episode of Dharma & Greg
- "The End of the Innocence", an episode of American Dreams

== See also ==
- End of Innocence (disambiguation)
