= Ali Baba and the Forty Thieves of Bagdad =

1995 Iranian video game

- Publisher: Parsian Computer
- Platform: MS-DOS
- Release: 1995

Ali Baba and the Forty Thieves of Bagdad, also known as Ali Baba, is a 1995 Iranian videogame published by Parsian Computer for MS-DOS.

Obviously based on the Ali Baba story of One Thousand and One Nights, the games copies mechanics from Prince of Persia.

== History ==
The game, widely regarded as Iran's first videogame, was created by Ramin ZafarAzizi and sold at his father's toy shop. Ramin was in charge of the programming and art asset creation, which was made with Deluxe Paint, and got some color correction and drawing advice by Ms. Farokhzad Mousaei.

Finally, the game was released in November 1995, being sold exclusively at the family business, except for ten copies distributed to other businesses. Also was distributed in the November issue of Elm Electronic va Computer. Ali Baba became popular by word of mouth, with presence at Tehran International Expo in 1997, and an interview in Iranian National TV in March 2000.

In 1997 a second improved version appeared, with voice acting, and three languages: Persian, Arabic, and English.
