= Majid Habibi =

Iranian voice actor

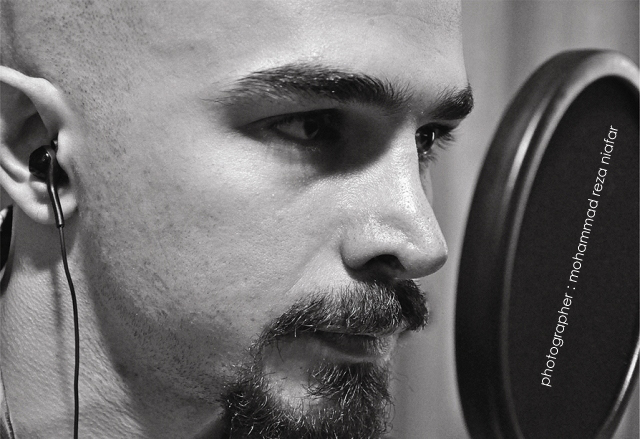
- Born: 30 December 1981 (age 44); Tehran, Iran
- Education: Soore University
- Years active: 2004–present
- Website: https://majidhabibi.com/

Majid Habibi (Persian: مجيد حبیبی; born December 20, 1981) is an Iranian voice actor. He is known for Persian voice acting for films, animations, documentaries, video games, film trailers, television advertisements, radio advertisements, network promotions, radio or audio dramas, puppet shows, audiobooks and television programs.

His fame started in 2006 for dubbing Otis character in Barnyard (2006) that received a lot of reception in Iran and home video but broadcasting prevented it from playing on channels because of showing cows breast in the animation. From other Habibi's works in voice acting that became very popular among people is Megamind (2010) that also this animation was banned from broadcasting because of Satanism symbol and showing American culture but received a lot of reception in home video and won best man voice actor in the second voice acting festival.

He graduated from Soore University with a Bachelor of Arts in Cultural Management.

== Early life ==
From an early age, he showed an interest in learning martial arts such as Judo, Kyokushin, Pro Wrestling, and Wado-Ryu Karate. As a young adult, he started to practice Wushu under coaches, Mohammad PourGholami and Masoud Jafari. He continued practicing the sport for several years and became champion and runner-up in state championships in 2000 and 2000. He also worked as a coach and judge. In his early thirties, he joined the Glory Dubbing Group after developing an interest in dubbing. Around the same time, he stopped participating in martial arts because of a slipped disc injury. He later continued pursuing work in dubbing and voice acting.

== Voice actor roles ==
Habibi's major roles are as following:

- Ted Templeton Jr. / Boss Baby in The Boss Baby: Family Business (2021)
- Chief Benja in Raya and the Last Dragon (2021)
- Lance Sterling in Spies in Disguise (2019)
- MufasaThe Lion King (2019 film)
- Mighty Eagle in The Angry Birds Movie 2 (2019)
- Snowball The Secret Life of Pets 2 (2019)
- Boss Baby in The Boss Baby (2017).
- Snowball The Secret Life of Pets (2016)
- Shere Khan in The Jungle Book (2016)
- Mighty Eagle in The Angry Birds Movie (2016)
- Top Cat Top Cat Begins (2015).
- Marcel in Rio (2011).
- Lord Shen (Gary Oldman) in Kung Fu Panda 2 (2011)
- Gobber the Belch in How to Train Your Dragon (2010)
- Megamind in Megamind (2010).
- General W.R. Monger in Monsters vs. Aliens (2009)
- Willie Bear in Horton Hears a Who! (2008)
- Lightning McQueen in Cars (2006)
- Mandi in Ice Age: The Meltdown (2006)
- Superman in Superman returns (2006).
- Keanu Reeves & Woody Harrelson in A Scanner Darkly (2006).
- Otis in Barnyard & Back at the Barnyard (2006).
- Dwayne LaFontant in Over the Hedge (2006)
- Fly in The Ant Bully (2006)
- Troy in Shark Bait (2006)
- Shaw in Open Season (2006).
- Bones in Monster House (2006)
- Lug in Robots (2005)
- Jamie Foxx in Stealth (2005)
- Eamonn Walker in Duma (2005).
- Zuko in Avatar: The Last Airbender (2005)
- Frankie in Shark Tale (2004)
- El Cid in El Cid: The Legend (2003)
- Ryan in Final Fantasy: The Spirits Within (2001)
- Tarzan in Tarzan (1999)

== Dub director ==
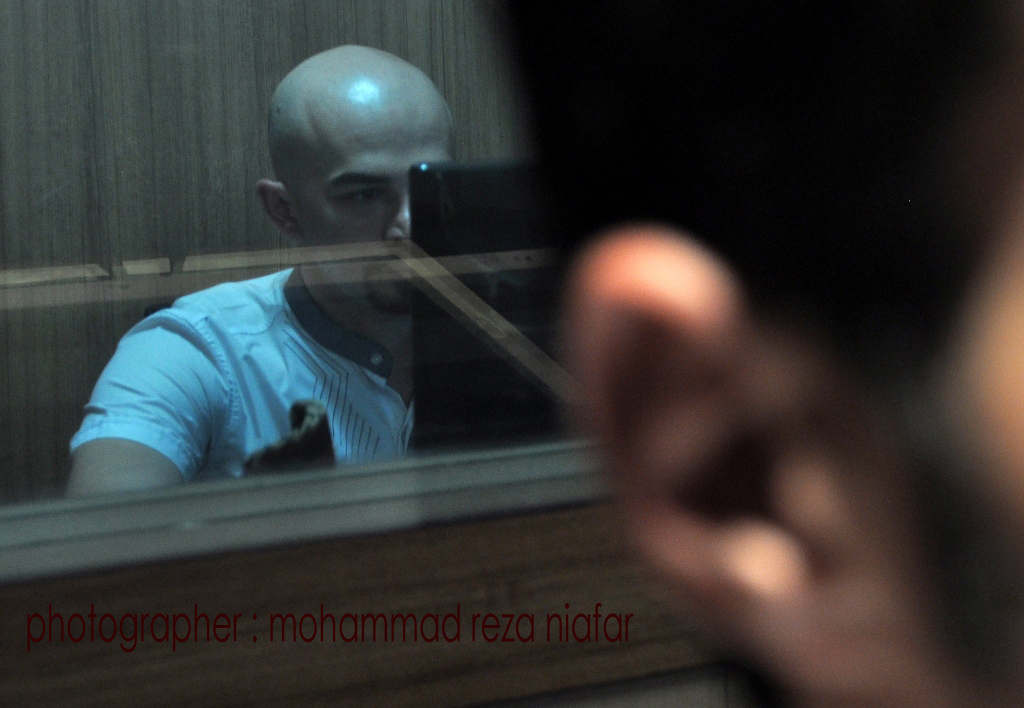
Majid Habibi, Dub director

- The Secret Garden (1993)
- A Little Princess (1995)
- The Living Forest (2001).
- Jester Till (2003)
- Stealth (2005)
- The Fox and the Hound 2 (2006)
- Phoebe in Wonderland (2008)
- Inside Job (2010 film) (2010)
- Ice Age: Continental Drift (2012).
- Street Fighter (Video game series)

== Book ==
Majid Habibi has also written a book about Voice acting in 2017 (solar calendar: 1396) in the name of Sedabazigar (Persian: صدابازیگر).

== Filmography ==
- Battle of the Kings: Rostam & Sohrab (2012). Sohrab And Afrasiab Voices.
- Paat (2013). Dub director
- Fish & Cat (2013). Narrator
- Red Carpet (2013). Dub director
- 360 Degree (2015). Voice actor

== Theater performance ==
- Zoro (2014). Voice actor, live voice acting.
- Red and the Others (2014).
- Afra, or the Day Passes (2016).

== Video game ==
- Farmandeh (2018).
- Shabgard (2014).
- Combat in the gulf of Aden (2012)
- Zolfaghar (2012)
- Orient: A Hero's Heritage (2008).

== Discography ==
Singles
English	Persian
4 Min & 4 Second More	چهار دقیقه و چهار ثانیه بیشتر
Be Honest	صادق باش
Reviews of the Fragments	ترکش مرورها
Requiem For The Persian Dream	مرثیه‌ای برای رؤیای پارسیان
Requiem For a World Full Of Evilism	مرثیه‌ای برای دنیایی مملو از صفات شیطانی

== Awards and nominations ==
=== In the field of voice acting ===
- Nominated for the best voice actor in first dubbing festival 2012.
- Best voice actor in second dubbing festival 2013.
- Best voice actor in third dubbing festival and nominated for the best dub director 2014.

=== In the field of sports ===
- National runner-up in sanshu department of wushu discipline (free fights) in 2000.
- National champion in taolu department of wushu discipline (chang chuan dramatic form and movements) in 2001.

== See also ==
- Mehrdad Raissi Ardali
