= Hooman Haji Abdollahi =

Iranian actor (born 1975)

- هومن حاجی‌عبداللهی
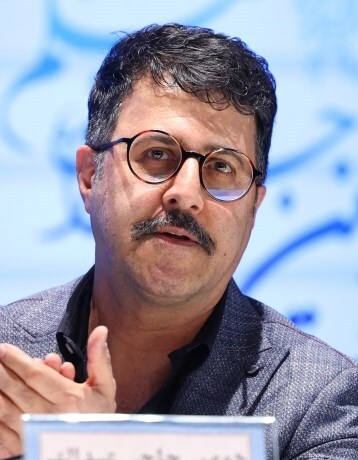
- Haji Abdollahi at the 2025 Fajr Film Festival
- Born: 14 July 1975 (age 50); Tehran, Iran
- Occupations: Actor; television presenter; voice actor
- Years active: 1994–present
- Spouse: Salimeh Ghotbi (m. 2003)
- Children: 1

Hooman Haji Abdollahi (Persian: هومن حاجی‌عبداللهی; born July 14, 1975) is an Iranian actor.

== Career ==
The most famous role in his acting is Rahmatollah Amini Shalikar hezarjaribi. He has been a member of Glory Entertainment (The Association of Tehran Young Voice Actors) for a short time. He has dubbed many roles, include Monsters vs. Aliens (as Dr. cockroach), Meet the Robinsons (as Grandpa), Barnyard (as Miles) and (Two Pizza Sellers), The Wild (as Zoo Squirrel), Avatar: The Last Airbender, SpongeBob SquarePants (as SpongeBob), Shrek (as Shrek), Happy Feet (as Shahin), Five Children and It, Coconut (as Lengeh). At the 37th Fajr International Theater Festival, he won the Best Actor award for his play in "Reincarnation 3 to 35 Tomans" in the "Iran Two" theater event .

== Filmography ==
=== Film ===
| Year | Title | Role | Director | Notes | Ref(s) |
|---|---|---|---|---|---|
| 2023 | Seven Citrus Aurantium | | Farshad Golsefidi | | |
| 2024 | Alligator Blood | Himself | Javad Ezzati | Cameo | |
| 2024 | Aryashahr, Two People | | Hamid Bahramian | | |
| 2025 | North by Southwest | Majid | Hamid Zargarnezhad | | |
| 2025 | Setareh's Husband | | Ebrahim Irajzad | | |

=== Television ===
| Year | Title | Role | Director | Network | Notes | Ref(s) |
|---|---|---|---|---|---|---|
| 2013–present | Capital | Rahmat Amini Shalikar Hezarjaribi | Sirous Moghaddam | IRIB TV1 | Main role | |

=== TV Presenter ===
| Title | note |
|---|---|
| One Hundred Seconds | TV show competition |
| Golden Cup | TV show competition |
| Snake and Ladder | TV show competition |
| Behind the Line | TV show competition |
| Golden Ball | TV show competition |
| Triangle | TV program |
| Celebration of Ramadan | TV program |
| Night Way or 25 o'clock | TV program |
| Friday is not a holiday | TV program |
| B like bahar | Special program |
| Be the Spring | |

=== Voice acting ===
- Coconut (Home video) (Voice actor of doll)
- Rainbow (Chapel voice actor)
- Rainbow (Pengul voice actor)
- Pengul or Cats City(Pengul voice actor)
- khandevaneh (farkhondeh voice actor)
- Pagard

=== Dubbing ===
- Ice Age (2002 film)
- Ice Age 3
- SpongeBob SquarePants
- Barnyard (as Miles / Pizzerias)
- Happy Feet
- Meet the Robinsons
- Avatar: The Last Airbender
- Monsters vs. Aliens
- Five Children and It
- The Wild
- The Legend of Arash
- Angry Birds
- Finding Dory
- Soul

=== Stand-up comedy ===
- Top Laughing

=== Home video ===
| Year | Title |
|---|---|
| 2020 | Mafia Nights |
| 2022 | Joker (Iranian TV series) |
