= Independent International Commission of Inquiry on the Occupied Palestinian Territory =

UN inquiry into Israel-Palestine

The Independent International Commission of Inquiry on the Occupied Palestinian Territory including East Jerusalem, and Israel (COI OPTEJI) was founded after the United Nations Human Rights Council voted, on 27 May 2021, to set up a United Nations fact-finding mission to investigate possible war crimes and other abuses committed in Israel and the Occupied Palestinian territories. This followed the 2021 Israel–Palestine crisis. The Commission has subsequently published several reports on possible war crimes and other abuses.

On 19 June 2024, the Commission reported that Israeli forces and Palestinian militant groups including Hamas were responsible for war crimes, and that Israel was responsible for crimes against humanity. A pattern of sexual violence by Palestinian militants against Israelis during the attacks on 7 October 2023 was identified, among other offences. Israel was found to have intentionally attacked civilians in Gaza and to have carried out the extermination of Palestinians, among other offences.

On 16 September 2025, the Commission concluded that Israel is committing genocide against Palestinians in Gaza. In its 72-page report, the Commission found reasonable grounds to determine that Israel has committed, and continues to commit, four of the five genocidal acts defined under the 1948 Genocide Convention. On 23 June 2026, the Commission released a report concluding that Israeli forces have deliberately targeted Palestinian children, resulting in genocide, crimes against humanity, and war crimes in Gaza, alongside atrocity crimes in the West Bank. The report found that children comprised roughly 30% of Gaza fatalities and stated that targeting them was a deliberate strategy to destroy the demographic vitality and future of the Palestinian people.

== Mission members ==
Former members include Navi Pillay (South Africa; 2021–2025); Miloon Kothari (India); and Chris Sidoti (Australia).

In November 2025, Sidoti was reappointed, with Srinivasan Muralidhar (India) appointed as chair, and Florence Mumba (Zambia) appointed as the third commissioner.

As of June 2026, Srinivasan Muralidhar serves as chair of the commission.

== Mandate ==
The commission will report to the Human Rights Council annually from June 2022. Unlike previous fact finding missions the inquiry is open ended and will examine "all underlying root causes of recurrent tensions, instability and protraction of conflict, including systematic discrimination and repression based on national, ethnic, racial or religious identity."

=== Opposition and response ===
Manpower was reduced from 24 to 18 persons following a US-Israel campaign to reduce the Commission budget. On 17 February 2022, Israel said it will not cooperate with the commission, alleging bias. At the end of March, 68 US senators signed a letter to Secretary of State Antony Blinken calling for the Biden administration to use its influence to quash the inquiry. In June 2023, United States and Israel joined 25 countries in condemning the open-ended nature of the UN investigation and "the long-standing disproportionate attention given to Israel in the council." Responding, Kothari said "There seems to be no sunset clause recommended to Israel to end the occupation.... as long as the occupation continues the UN needs to investigate the occupation...we would like to see the end of the occupation."

== Reports ==
=== 2022–2023 Reports: Initial Findings on the Occupation ===
The first annual report (A/HRC/50/21) to the General Assembly was released on 7 June 2022. The report said that ending the occupation would be insufficient. It said that the root cause of the problems lay in "perpetual occupation" with no intent to end it and that Israel wanted "complete control" over the occupied area. Israel refused access to Israel or the Palestinian territories, Palestinian and Israeli testimony was collected in Geneva and Jordan. Israel's Foreign Ministry and the U.S State department rejected the report as biased.

When the report was formally presented to the 50th session of the Human Rights Council on 13 June 2022, the United States representative read out a statement objecting to the mandate given to the Committee, saying that it was unfair scrutiny of Israel. Including the United States and Israel, twenty-two countries, most not UNHRC members, signed the statement. Addressing the Council, Navi Pillay said: "Given a clear refusal by Israel to take concrete measures to implement the findings and recommendations of past commissions, the international community must urgently explore new ways of ensuring compliance with international law." She also criticized the Palestinian Authority for its failure to hold legislative and Presidential elections and leaders in Gaza for their failure to uphold human rights standards.

On 20 October 2022, the commission released a report (A/77/328) to the United Nations General Assembly, calling on the Security Council to end Israel's "permanent occupation" and on individual UN member states to prosecute Israeli officials. The report found "reasonable grounds" to conclude that the occupation "is now unlawful under international law due to its permanence" and Israel's "de-facto annexation policies." The commission has requested that an International Court of Justice advisory opinion declaring the occupation illegal be obtained. Israeli prime minister Yair Lapid said the report is "biased, false, inciting and blatantly unbalanced" and tweeted that "Not all criticism of Israel is anti-Semitism, but this report was written by anti-Semites … and is a distinctly anti-Semitic report".

On 2 June 2023, the commission presented a report (A/HRC/53/CRP.1) accusing Israel of silencing civil society and Palestinian NGOs, and said it intended to probe Israeli settler violence and its link to West Bank annexation.

=== 2023–2024 Reports: Investigation of the Gaza War ===
The second annual report (A/78/198) to the General Assembly was published on 5 September 2023 and states "The commission finds the increasingly militarised law enforcement operations of Israel and repeated attacks by Israel on Gaza are aimed at maintaining its unlawful 56-year occupation."

On 19 June 2024, the commission presented its first report on the Gaza war to the United Nations Human Rights Council during its 56th regular session. The report was the UN's first in-depth investigation of the conflict and covered the period from 7 October to 31 December 2023. In its report (A/HRC/56/26) the Commission affirmed that both Hamas and Israel committed war crimes and that Israel's actions also constituted crimes against humanity. The report found that the military wing of Hamas and six other Palestinian armed groups are responsible for the war crimes of intentionally directing attacks against civilians, murder or willful killing, torture, inhuman or cruel treatment, destroying or seizing the property of an adversary, outrages upon personal dignity, and taking hostages, including children. The commission identified a pattern of sexual violence committed by Palestinian militants against Israeli victims.

In relation to Israeli military operations and attacks in Gaza, the commission concluded that Israeli authorities are responsible for the war crimes of starvation as a method of warfare, murder or willful killing, intentionally directing attacks against civilians and civilian objects, forcible transfer, sexual violence, torture and inhuman or cruel treatment, arbitrary detention and outrages upon personal dignity. It also found that Israel committed numerous crimes against humanity, including carrying out the extermination of Palestinians and gender persecution targeting Palestinian men and boys. The commission said that they had submitted 7,000 pieces of evidence to the International Criminal Court related to crimes committed by Israel and Hamas, as part of the International Criminal Court investigation in Palestine.

The third annual report (A/79/232) to the General Assembly was published on 11 September 2024 and examines the treatment of detainees and hostages and attacks on medical facilities and personnel from 7 October 2023 to August 2024 in Gaza.

=== 2025 Reports: Findings on Gender-Based Violence and Genocide ===
On 13 March 2025, the commission submitted a report (A /HRC/58/CRP.6) to the Human Rights Council on the systematic use of sexual, reproductive and other gender-based violence carried out since 7 October 2023 by the Israeli Security Forces and Israeli settlers. The report found that certain forms of sexual and gender-based violence, including forced public stripping and nudity, sexual harassment, threats of rape, and sexual assault are part of "standard operating procedures" of Israel's security forces.

The report concludes that "the frequency, prevalence and severity of sexual and gender-based crimes perpetrated across the Occupied Palestinian Territory [suggest] that sexual and gender-based violence is increasingly used as a method of war by Israel to destabilise, dominate, oppress and destroy the Palestinian people". The Commission also finds, that the Israeli justice system "does not meet international standards of justice with respect to its application to Palestinians [as it is] used to persecute Palestinians and exculpate perpetrators".

The fourth report of the commission submitted to UN General Assembly on 16 August 2025 stated that the Israeli military forces have been perpetrating four genocidal acts against the civilians in Gaza. According to the commission's report, these four genocidal acts included:

"(a) killing members of the group;

(b) causing serious bodily or mental harm to members of the group;

(c) deliberately inflicting on the group conditions of life calculated to bring about its physical destruction in whole or in part; and

(d) imposing measures intended to prevent births within the group."

The commission also noted that Israeli soldiers carried out genocidal acts under direct orders and incitement from the Israeli military and political leadership. The commission concluded that the perpetration of these genocidal acts are part of the Israeli regime's "consistent pattern of conduct" to "physically destroy the Palestinians". Presenting the commission's fourth report to the UN General Assembly on 28 October 2025, Navi Pillay described the Gaza genocide as “the most ruthless, prolonged and widespread attack against the Palestinian people in history.” She further urged UN member states to sever all military, economic, and diplomatic ties with the Israeli regime.

On 16 September 2025, the Independent International Commission of Inquiry on the Occupied Palestinian Territory released a report concluding that Israel is failing to prevent and is actively committing genocide against Palestinians. The commission that released the report was set up by the United Nations Human Rights Council (UNHRC), though it is independent and does not officially represent the UN. The Commission found Israel guilty of four out of five acts specified in Article 2 of the 1948 Genocide Convention against Palestinians (murder, causing serious bodily or mental harm, deliberately inflicting conditions of life calculated to destroy the group, and imposing measures to prevent births) and found statements by senior Israeli officials alongside other evidence sufficient to establish genocidal intent. The report called for genocide charges to be added to the ICC arrest warrants for Israeli leaders.

The report's official title is Legal analysis of the conduct of Israel in Gaza pursuant to the Convention on the Prevention and Punishment of the Crime of Genocide. The report, spanning 72 pages long, resulted from a two-year investigation, examining evidence between 7 October 2023 and 31 July 2025 limited to the Gaza Strip. The report was released in the 60th session of the Human Rights Council in Geneva, Switzerland.

=== 2026 Report: Findings on the Targeting of Children ===
On 23 June 2026, the commission published a 94-page report titled "'The essence of childhood has been destroyed': Israel's deliberate targeting of Palestinian children in the Occupied Palestinian Territory since 7 October 2023" (A/HRC/62/CRP.2). The report found that between October 2023 and October 2025, the conflict resulted in the deaths of at least 20,179 Palestinian children and injuries to 44,143 others, representing approximately 30% of the overall death toll, a significantly higher proportion of child fatalities than in previous Gaza conflicts. Backed by forensic pathology analysis of CT scans and medical reports, the commission concluded there were reasonable grounds to determine that Israeli forces directly targeted children using snipers and quadcopter drones. The report highlighted specific cases, such as a 14-year-old boy left to bleed to death by a military patrol when no active fighting was occurring, and documented a widespread pattern of Israeli soldiers filming themselves mocking, weaponizing, and desecrating symbols of childhood across at least 35 instances in private homes and public spaces, which it assessed demonstrated a prevailing dehumanizing attitude enabled by a tacit acceptance among military commanders. The commission asserted that these actions continued past the October 2025 ceasefire and served as a key element establishing genocidal intent to destroy the Palestinian group in Gaza by weakening its capacity to exist, causing irreversible physical and long-term psychological harm, and producing an intergenerational "occupied psyche". The report also found that Israel's targeting of neonatal and maternity care centers directly impacted the survival of newborns, resulting in increased miscarriages and birth defects, while severe blockades caused fatal malnutrition. In the West Bank and East Jerusalem, the report documented a sharp increase in settler violence against children and found systematic mistreatment, food deprivation, and sexual violence against detained Palestinian boys, concluding that the treatment constituted the crimes against humanity of torture and other inhumane acts. The commission noted it had identified specific military units within the Israeli security forces responsible for these actions to ensure future legal accountability.

== See also ==
- International Criminal Court investigation in Palestine
- Legality of the Israeli occupation of Palestine
- Human rights violations against Palestinians by Israel
- Israeli apartheid
- Gaza genocide
