= Quest of Persia =

Quest of Persia is an Iranian action-adventure video game series. The first Game of the series “The End of Innocence” was released in September 2005. "Lotfali Khan Zand" was released in May 2008.

| Title | Developer | Platforms | First Released |
|---|---|---|---|
| Quest of Persia: The End of Innocence | Puya Arts | Windows | September 25, 2005 |
| Quest of Persia: Lotfali Khan Zand | Puya Arts | Windows | May 5, 2008 |
| Quest of Persia: Nader's Blade | Puya Arts | Windows | July 20, 2009 |

== Quest of Persia: The End of Innocence ==
Quest of Persia: The End of Innocence
- Developer: Puya Arts
- Publisher: Puya Arts
- Engine: QoP Engine
- Platform: Windows
- Release: NA: September 25, 2005
- Genre: Action-adventure
- Mode: Single-player

Quest of Persia: The End of Innocence (Persian: پايان معصومیت) is the first game of the series which was released in September 2005 in Iran. It was developed and published by Persian studio Puya Arts. It was the first 3D game to be developed in Iran.

The story begins with Iraq attacking Iran from the air, sea and land. Arashk who is an engineer working in Petrochemical plant, gets caught in the attacks, and has to escape the factory while it's burning into ashes. He meets Leyla an archeologist who is working in the desert. She is trying to find out the secrets of Ancient Persian Sites. Together they have to fight the Iraqi Invasion army, while trying to solve the mystery of Ancient Sites. Arashk and Leyla find a manuscript which provides them with information about secrets of Ancient Persian Sites. It gives them a clue about the famous battle of Agha Mohammad Khan Ghajar and Lotfali Khan Zand.

The Major part of the game is a Quake style First Person Shooter game with various weapons. There are also some driving missions, and a puzzle. The game has 21 one short levels and can be completed in five hours.

QoP: The End of Innocence two years after its release has become "The Best Iranian Game Of The Year" at the WCG (World Cyber Games) 2007's Iranian national final.

It has been described as "Quake II dropped on its head in a desert" by PC Zone UK.

== Quest of Persia: Lotfali Khan Zand ==
Quest of Persia: Lotfali Khan Zand
- Developer: QoP Dev Team
- Publisher: Pardis Games
- Engine: C4 Engine
- Platform: Windows
- Release: NA: May 5, 2008
- Genre: Action-adventure
- Mode: Single-player

Quest of Persia: Lotfali Khan Zand (Persian: لطفعلی خان زند) is the second installment of the "Quest of Persia" game series. The game was released on May 5, 2008. It's a third person sword fighting game, which tells the story of the last swordsman of the east, Lotfali Khan Zand, the brave king of Persia, 200 years ago. The Game world reflects the splendor of Persian culture at that time.

The story happens in the 17th century when the Agha Mohammad Khan Ghajar controls the north and central part of Iran. After Lotfali Khan Zand has been betrayed by his minister Ebrahim Kalantar and loses his capital Shiraz, he decides to take the fortress close to the capitol called Zarghan and make it his command center. Little that he knew Ebrahim Kalantar, and Agha Mohammad Khan Ghajar prepared a huge assault on Zarghan. He escapes to Kerman, where the second part of the game takes place...

The Major part of the game is Third Person sword-fighting with various moves and weapons. Additionally the game features other gameplays such as mechanical puzzles, and command attacks. The game has 22 levels and can be completed in five hours.

Quest of Persia: Lotfali Khan Zand won the golden trophy for best Persian game of the year from the second digital media festival. MEGamers (The Voice of Gaming in the Middle East) and Persian game website Game PF-I previewed Quest of Persia: Lotfali Khan Zand. N4G reviewed the game, awarding 6.5/10 score. Persian website GamersLand called Quest of Persia the best Iranian game ever built, but rated it 4.6 / 10.

== Quest of Persia: Nader's Blade ==
Quest of Persia: Nader's Blade
- Developer: Puya Arts
- Publisher: Puya Arts
- Engine: C4 Engine
- Platform: Windows
- Release: NA: July 20, 2009
- Genre: Action-adventure
- Mode: Single-player

Quest of Persia: Nader's Blade is the third installment of the "Quest of Persia" game series. The game was released on July 20, 2009. It's a third person sword fighting game, which tells the story of the great king of Persia, Nader Shah. The game references historical characters of that era.

The gameplay features an advanced third person sword-fighting with different playable characters, various combos, counterattacks, and kill moves.

== Awards ==
QoP: Nader's Blade has become "The Best Persian Game Of The Year" at the third digital media festival.

== See also ==
- Prince of Persia
- Quest of Persia: The End of Innocence
- Quest of Persia: Lotfali Khan Zand
- Orient: A Hero's Heritage
- Donya ye Bazi The first official game magazine in Iran
