= Zoé Samudzi =

American writer, photographer and activist

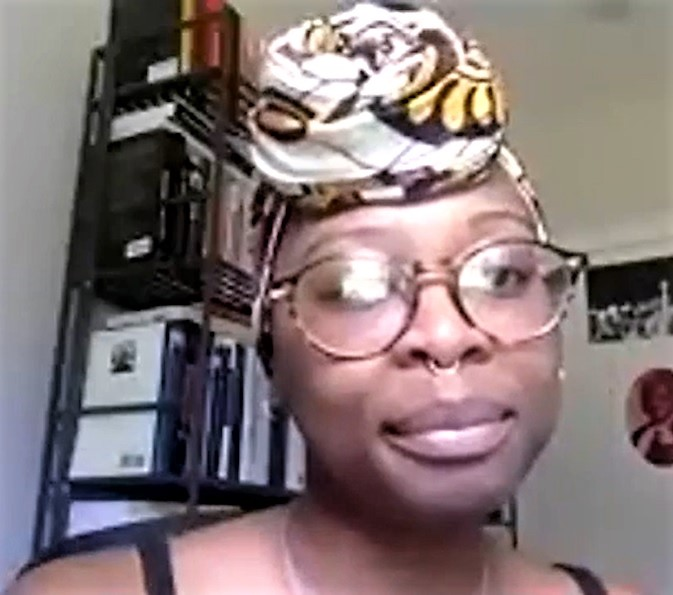
- Samudzi in 2020
- Born: 1992 or 1993 (age 32–33)
- Education: Northwest Missouri State University; University of Pittsburgh (BA); London School of Economics (MS); University of California, San Francisco (PhD)
- Website: www.zoesamudzi.com

Zoé Samudzi (born 1992/1993) is an American writer and activist known for her co-authored book As Black as Resistance. Samudzi has written for The New Inquiry, The Daily Beast and Vice magazine. Samudzi was a 2017 Public Imagination Fellow at the Yerba Buena Center for the Arts. She is currently a postdoctoral scholar at the Department of African-American and Africana Studies at The Ohio State University.

== Early life and education ==
Samudzi's parents are from Zimbabwe and grew up in British colonial Africa. Her grandfather was Abel Muzorewa, the first and only Prime Minister of Zimbabwe Rhodesia. She attended the Northwest Missouri State University (then Missouri Academy of Sciences) where she took part in the Model United Nations. She was an undergraduate student at the University of Pittsburgh, where she studied political science and African studies. While at the University of Pittsburgh, Samudzi attended a rally in response to the unjust shooting of Trayvon Martin, where she called for police and government accountability.

In 2013 Samudzi moved to London, where she completed a master's programme at the London School of Economics. As a doctoral researcher at the University of California, San Francisco, she studied German colonialism, the Herero and Namaqua genocide and the role of science in Indigenous and Black identity. She has studied the barriers that transgender people face accessing healthcare, contextualizing trans health within "larger systems of oppression".

== Writing and career ==
In 2018 Samudzi and William C. Anderson published their co-authored book, As Black as Resistance, which called for a new type of politics for Black Americans. Her work with Anderson on Black anti-fascism notes that "Black radical formations are themselves fundamentally anti-fascist despite functioning outside of 'conventional' antifa spaces." Her critique of white anti-fascism states that it fails to account for the fact that "American fascism is an evolution of state carceral forms that were founded on the settler genocide of indigenous communities and the enslavement of black people." Until white anti-fascists do more than repeat Black Lives Matter slogans and "fully assimilate nonwhite thinkers into the body of knowledge that we rely on to counter fascism" they will not be able to fully address the complexity of the US anti-fascist movement.

Samudzi is an intersectional feminist, believing that "woman is not a catchall category that alone defines all our relationships to power". Samudzi described the COVID-19 pandemic as a "pandemic of western movement". She investigated the reasons that coronavirus disease disproportionately impacted the Black community, and reported on the legacy of apartheid as seen in the COVID response from Namibia. Samudzi has argued for anarchism in an interview and expressed support for the EZLN.

On Juneteenth 2020 Samudzi's quotation, "We are not ready to fight because we love fighting. We are ready to fight because we are worth fighting for.", was selected by Bustle as one of the best quotations to keep inspired in the fight for racial justice.

Since 2022, Samudzi has been an associate editor of Parapraxis, a magazine of psychoanalysis and politics.

From 2023 to 2025, she was the Charles E. Scheidt Visiting Assistant Professor of Genocide Studies and Genocide Prevention at the Strassler Center for Holocaust and Genocide Studies at Clark University.

== Art and creative works ==
In 2018, Samudzi curated an art show at the Ashara Ekundayo gallery in Oakland, California, which is dedicated to Black women artists. She was part of a five-member Oakland film collective called The Black Aesthetic dedicated to highlighting "the multidimensionality of Blackness in under appreciated films or works by emerging filmmakers, which put on screenings and lectures for three seasons. Samudzi would often act as the visiting scholar, leading discussions of films after the showings. "The East Bay Express described Samudzi as the "Best Voice for a Radical New Future."

== Selected publications ==
=== Books ===
- Samudzi, Zoé; Anderson, William C. (5 June 2018). As black as resistance : finding the conditions for liberation. Chico, CA: AK Press. ISBN 978-1-84935-315-1. OCLC 1037813731.

=== Articles and chapters ===
- Samudzi, Zoe; Mannell, Jenevieve (2016-01-02). "Cisgender male and transgender female sex workers in South Africa: gender variant identities and narratives of exclusion". Culture, Health & Sexuality. 18 (1): 1–14. doi:10.1080/13691058.2015.1062558. ISSN 1369-1058. PMID 26242843. S2CID 25303598.
- Samudzi, Zoe; Anderson, William C. (2017-06-01). "The Anarchism of Blackness". Roar Magazine (5): 70–81.
- Samudzi, Zoe (4 July 2019). "Afro-Diasporic Feminism and Freedom in Fluidity". In Eric-Udorie, June (ed.). Can we all be feminists?: seventeen writers on intersectionality, identity and finding the right way forward for feminism. Little, Brown Book Group Limited. ISBN 978-0-349-00988-9. OCLC 1051693928.
- Samudzi, Zoe (10 June 2020). "Stealing Away in America". Jewish Currents.

== See also ==
- Anarchism in the United States
- Black anarchism
- Hypatia transracialism controversy
