= Video games in Iran =

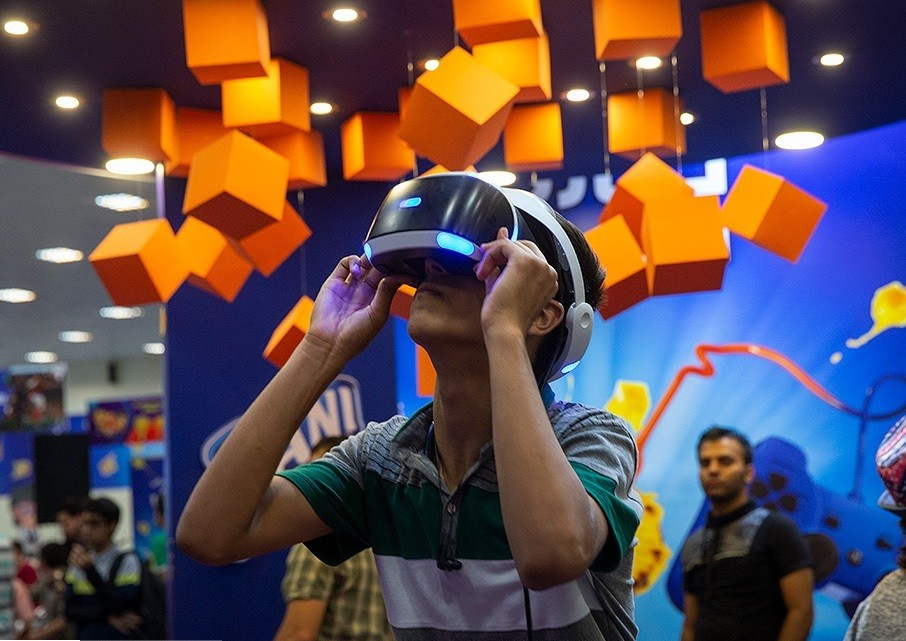
An Iranian player at a game event in Tehran in 2020

Video games are among the most popular hobbies of Iranians.

According to the country's official statistics in 2022, Iran has 34 million gamers. In this year, the total population of the country was 84 million people. Also, 41% of Iranian gamers are female, and Alborz province has the most gamers while Qom province has the least gamers. Approximately 58% of gamers play online and 56% of them play daily. 96% of Iranian gamers play with mobile phones, 88% with home consoles, 59% with personal computers, 48% with laptops, 14% with tablets and 13% with handheld consoles. Also, 33% of Iranian gamers play on multiple platforms.

Economic sanctions against Iran have hampered Iranian video game developers and their participation in international trade. The sanctions prevent their licensing of major game engines. Among consumers, sanctions block use of major digital stores and limit access to credit cards.

== Demographics ==
There were about 23 million video game players in the country as of 2015. By 2021 this had increased to 32 million.

The average age of an Iranian gamer is 25.

== History ==
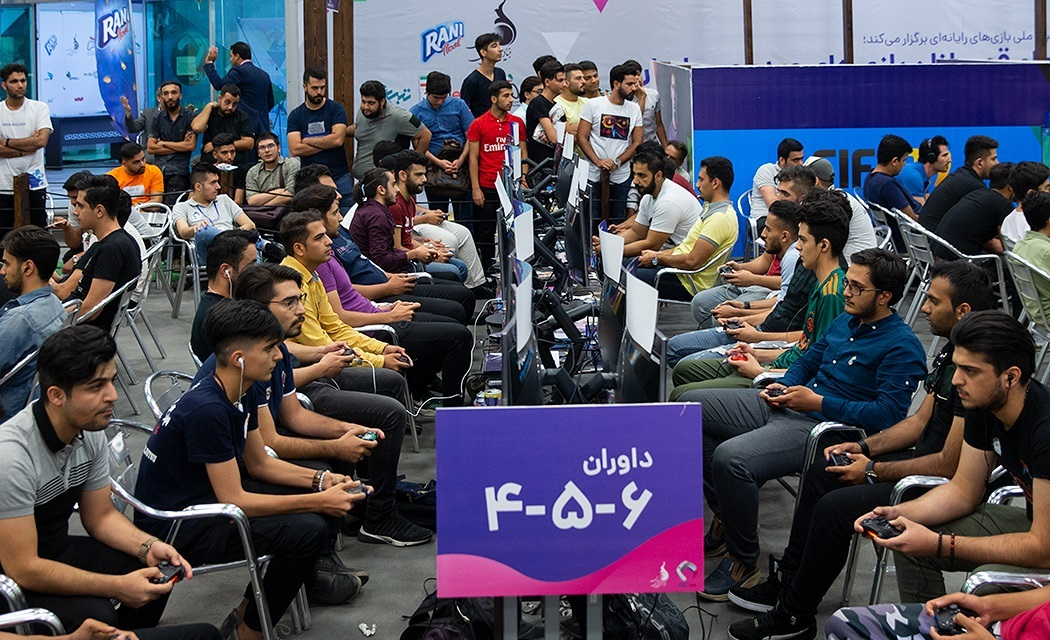
An esports event in Tehran

The first Iranian game console which was named as "Video Master" was released into market in 1976. Its production factory was situated in Isfahan. The next Iranian company in this field was called as "General Electronic kit", situated in Tehran, which in 1978 was producing a game console named as "TV Game".

Hanfa, was the first Iranian game studio, which was established in mid-90s. "Tank Hunter" was the name of its first game produced, and "Ali Baba" was the second one. The first 3D video game of Iran was named as "Payan-e Masumiat" and was produced by the Iranian game studio "Puya Arts".

During the mid-2000s, Iran's domestic gaming industry thrived, with companies such as Darinoos localizing pirated international PC games, and domestic studios like "Puya Arts" and "Dead Mage" drawing inspiration from Iranian history to create content, capitalizing on their unique approach to attract a local following.

According to WIRED, Iran has used digital games like "Safire Eshgh" and "Commander of the Resistance: Amerli Battle" as part of their propaganda machine to promote state ideology. This was rejected by Tasnim News Agency, a news organization affiliated with the Islamic Revolutionary Guard Corps.

== Internet and social media ==
Cosplay and the economy related to the sale of clothing of game characters in Iran, although rejected by the government, are significant. The cosplay of game characters is usually done on TikTok or Instagram by Iranian users. Characters like Elastigirl, Spiderman, Supergirl and Ellie have been the most popular of the 2010s and 2020s.

== Magazines ==
Cover of Donya-ye Bazi, No. 70, February 2010

The first Iranian magazine specialized in video game news, titled Bazi-e Rayaneh was established in 2001.

Donya-ye Bazi (Persian: دنیای بازی), also known as DBazi or Donya e Baz, was an Iranian Persian-language computer games magazine. Founded by editor-in-chief Babak Namazian in September 2005, the magazine was devoted to supporting Iranian game developers, reviewing PC and console games and covering game industry news.

The magazine's website, dbazi.com, was established in 2009, making it the first Iranian gaming news website. Donya ye Bazi ceased publication after September 2014.

== See also ==
- 1979 Revolution: Black Friday
