= Maryam Jamshidi =

Iranian-American writer and academic

Maryam Jamshidi is a US legal scholar, working at the University of Colorado Law School since 2023.

== Teaching ==
Jamshidi was a lecturer at the University of Florida (UF) until mid 2023. In May 2023, following Floridan state-level legislation opposing anti-prejudice policies in Floridan universities, Jamshidi resigned from UF and stated that she "could [no longer] teach in the classroom or do [her] scholarship in the way [she] wanted to in an environment like UF". She started a new position at University of Colorado Law School in June 2023.

== Works ==
- Jamshidi, Maryam (2013). The Future of the Arab Spring: Civic Entrepreneurship in Politics, Art, and Technology Startups. Elsevier. ISBN 978-0-12-416574-8.
