= Genocides in history (World War I through World War II) =

Overview of genocides from 1914 to 1945

Genocide is the intentional destruction of a people (Note: Defined under the Genocide Convention as "national, ethnical, racial, or religious group.") in whole or in part. The term was coined in 1944 by Raphael Lemkin. It is defined in Article 2 of the Convention on the Prevention and Punishment of the Crime of Genocide (CPPCG) of 1948 as "any of the following acts committed with intent to destroy, in whole or in part, a national, ethnical, racial, or religious group, as such: killing members of the group; causing serious bodily or mental harm to members of the group; deliberately inflicting on the group conditions of life calculated to bring about its physical destruction in whole or in part; imposing measures intended to prevent births within the group; [and] forcibly transferring children of the group to another group."

The preamble to the CPPCG states that "genocide is a crime under international law, contrary to the spirit and aims of the United Nations and condemned by the civilized world", and it also states that "at all periods of history genocide has inflicted great losses on humanity." Genocide is widely considered to be the epitome of human evil, and has been referred to as the "crime of crimes". The Political Instability Task Force estimated that 43 genocides occurred between 1956 and 2016, resulting in 50 million deaths. The UNHCR estimated that a further 50 million had been displaced by such episodes of violence.

== Definitions of genocide ==
The debate continues over what legally constitutes genocide. One definition is any conflict that the International Criminal Court has so designated. Mohammed Hassan Kakar argues that the definition should include political groups or any group so defined by the perpetrator. He prefers the definition from Frank Chalk and Kurt Jonassohn, which defines genocide as "a form of one-sided mass killing in which a state or other authority intends to destroy a group so defined by the perpetrator."

In literature, some scholars have popularly emphasized the role that the Soviet Union played in excluding political groups from the international definition of genocide, which is contained in the Genocide Convention of 1948, and in particular they have written that Joseph Stalin may have feared greater international scrutiny of the political killings that occurred in the country, such as the Great Purge; however, this claim is not supported by evidence. The Soviet view was shared and supported by many diverse countries, and they were also in line with Raphael Lemkin's original conception, (Note: By 1951, Lemkin was saying that the Soviet Union was the only state that could be indicted for genocide; his concept of genocide, as it was outlined in Axis Rule in Occupied Europe, covered Stalinist deportations as genocide by default, and differed from the adopted Genocide Convention in many ways. From a 21st-century perspective, its coverage was very broad, and as a result, it would classify almost any gross human rights violation as a genocide, and many events that were deemed genocidal by Lemkin did not amount to genocide under the convention. As the Cold War began, this change was the result of Lemkin's turn to anti-communism in an attempt to convince the United States to ratify the Genocide Convention.) and it was originally promoted by the World Jewish Congress.

== First half of the 20th century (World War I through World War II) ==
In 1915, during World War I, the concept of crimes against humanity was introduced into international relations for the first time when the Allied Powers sent a letter to the government of the Ottoman Empire, a member of the Central Powers, protesting massacres that were taking place within the Empire.

== Ottoman Empire ==
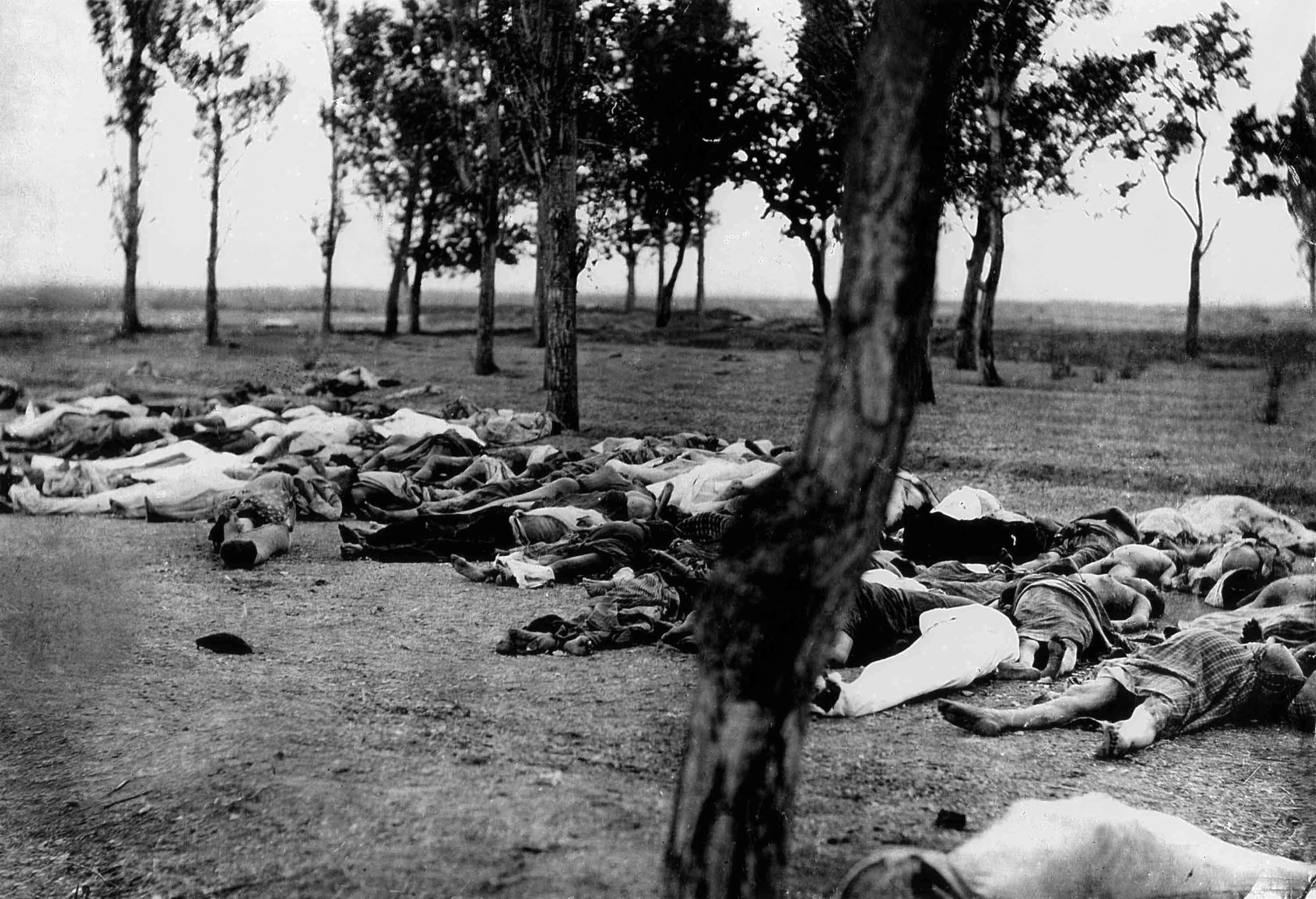
Of this photo, the U.S. ambassador Henry Morgenthau, Sr. wrote, "Scenes like this were common all over the Armenian provinces, in the spring and summer months of 1915. Death in its several forms—massacre, starvation, exhaustion—destroyed the larger part of the refugees. The Turkish policy was that of extermination under the guise of deportation".

On 24 May 1915, the Allied Powers (Britain, France, and Russia) jointly issued a statement which for the first time ever explicitly charged a government, the Ottoman Empire, with committing a "crime against humanity" in reference to that regime's persecution of its Christian minorities, including Armenians, Assyrians and Greeks. Many researchers consider these events a single genocide rather than separate genocides, based on their belief that all of these genocides were part of the planned ethnoreligious purification of the Turkish state, a policy which was implemented and advanced by the Young Turks.

This joint statement stated, "[i]n view of these new crimes of Turkey against humanity and civilisation, the Allied Governments announce publicly to the Sublime Porte that they will hold personally responsible for these crimes all members of the Ottoman Government, as well as those of their agents who are implicated in such massacres."

=== Greeks ===
The Greek genocide refers to the fate of the Greek population of the Ottoman Empire both during and after World War I (1914–18). Like the Armenians and the Assyrians, the Greeks were also subjected to massacres, expulsions, death marches and various other forms of persecution by the Young Turks. The mass killing of Greeks continued to occur under the rule of the Turkish National Movement during the Greco-Turkish War phase of the Turkish War of Independence. George W. Rendel of the British Foreign Office, among other diplomats, documented the massacres and deportations of Greeks during the post-Armistice period. Estimates of the number of Anatolian Greeks who were killed range from 348,000 to 900,000.

=== Assyrians ===
The Assyrian genocide (also known as the Sayfo or the Seyfo; Aramaic: ܩܛܠܐ ܕܥܡܐ ܐܬܘܪܝܐ or ܣܝܦܐ, Turkish: Süryani Soykırımı) was committed against the Assyrian population of the Ottoman Empire during the First World War by the Young Turks. The Assyrian population of northern Mesopotamia (Tur Abdin, Hakkâri, Van, Siirt region in modern-day southeastern Turkey and Urmia region in northwestern Iran) was forcibly relocated and massacred by Ottoman (Turkish and allied Kurdish) forces between 1914 and 1920. This genocide paralleled the Armenian genocide and Greek genocide. The Assyro-Chaldean National Council stated in a 4 December 1922, memorandum that the total death toll is unknown, but it estimated that about 750,000 Assyrians were murdered between 1914 and 1918.

=== Armenians ===
The Armenian genocide (Armenian: Հայոց Ցեղասպանություն, translit.: Hayots' Ts'eġaspanout'youn; Turkish: Ermeni Soykırımı and Ermeni Kıyımı) refers to the deliberate and systematic destruction of the Armenian population of the Ottoman Empire which occurred both during and just after World War I. It was implemented through extensive massacres and deportations, with the deportations consisting of forced marches under conditions which were designed to lead to the death of the deportees. The total number of resulting deaths is generally held to have been between one and one and a half million.

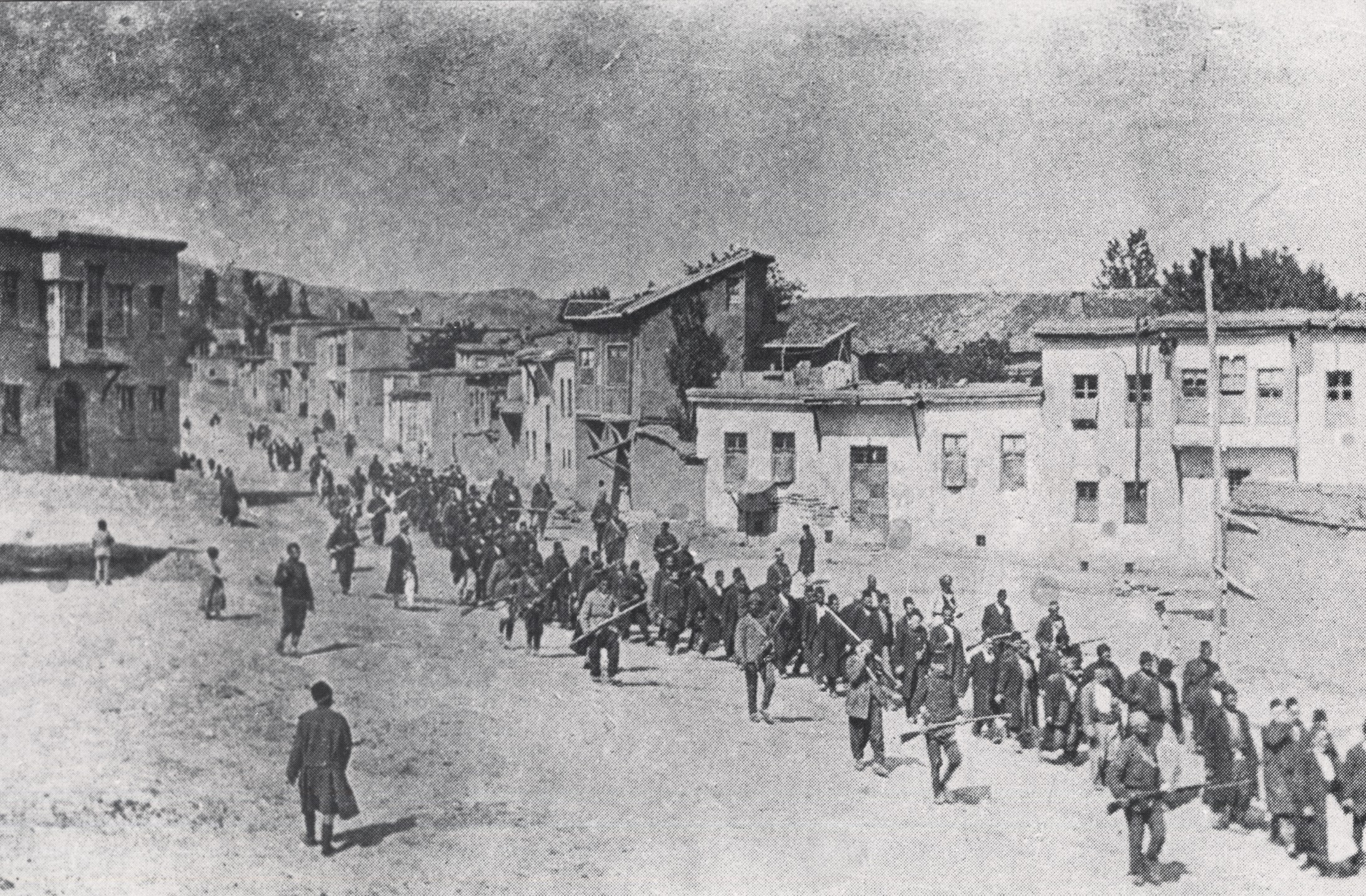
Armenian civilians, escorted by armed Ottoman soldiers, are marched through Kharpert to a prison in the nearby Mezireh district, April 1915.

The genocide began on 24 April 1915, when Ottoman authorities arrested some 250 Armenian intellectuals and community leaders in Constantinople. Thereafter, the Ottoman military uprooted Armenians from their homes and forced them to march hundreds of miles, without food or water, to the desert of what is now Syria. The Armenians were massacred regardless of their age or gender, with rape and other acts of sexual abuse being commonplace. The majority of Armenian diaspora communities were founded as a result of these events. Mass killings continued to be committed by the Republic of Turkey during the Turkish–Armenian War phase of the Turkish War of Independence.

Modern Turkey succeeded the Ottoman Empire in 1923 and since then, it has denied the fact that a genocide occurred. In recent years, it has resisted calls to acknowledge the crime by scholars, countries and international organisations.

=== Diyarbekir ===
In 1915, a genocide was committed in Diyarbekir vilayet, claiming the lives of most Armenians, Syriac Christians, Greek Orthodox, and Greek Catholics living there. The genocide was ordered by governor Mehmed Reshid, partly with the backing of the CUP Central Committee. According to historian David Gaunt, "These figures indicate that although the eradication of the Assyrian [Syriac] population was extreme, it was still not as total as for the Armenians." According to historian Uğur Ümit Üngör, "all Christian communities of Diyarbekir were equally hit by the genocide, although the Armenians were often particularly singled out for immediate destruction".

=== Yazidis ===
During the Armenian genocide, many Yazidis were killed by Hamidiye cavalry. According to Aziz Tamoyan, as many as 300,000 Yazidis were killed with the Armenians, while others fled to Transcaucasia.

=== Kurds ===
Concurrent to the Late Ottoman genocides most sources suggest that as many as 700,000 Kurds were deported during World War I, although there are no reliable statistics. Safrastian (1948) estimates that half of these deported Kurds died. Genocide scholar Üngör writes that "it would require a separate study to calculate meticulously how many were deported".

A few decades later deportations continued. The Dersim massacre for example refers to the depopulation of Dersim in Turkish Kurdistan, in 1937–38, in which approximately 13,000–40,000 Alevi Kurds were killed and thousands more of them were driven into exile. A key component of the Turkification process was a policy of massive population resettlement. The main document, the 1934 Law on Resettlement, was used to target the region of Dersim as one of its first test cases, with disastrous consequences for the local population.

Many Kurds and some ethnic Turks consider the events which took place in Dersim a genocide. A prominent proponent of this view is İsmail Beşikçi. Under international laws, the actions of the Turkish authorities were arguably not genocide, because they were not aimed at the extermination of a people, but at resettlement and suppression. A Turkish court ruled in 2011 that the events could not be considered genocide because they were not directed systematically against an ethnic group. Scholars such as Martin van Bruinessen, have instead talked of an ethnocide directed against the local language and identity.

== Russia and the Soviet Union ==
=== Kyrgyz ===
In 1916, in territory which is currently part of Kazakhstan and Kyrgyzstan, an uprising against Tsarist Russia occurred. A public commission in Kyrgyzstan called the crackdown of 1916 in which 100,000 to 270,000 Kyrgyz were killed, a genocide, though Russia rejected this characterisation. Russian sources put the death toll at 3,000.

=== Pogroms against Jews ===
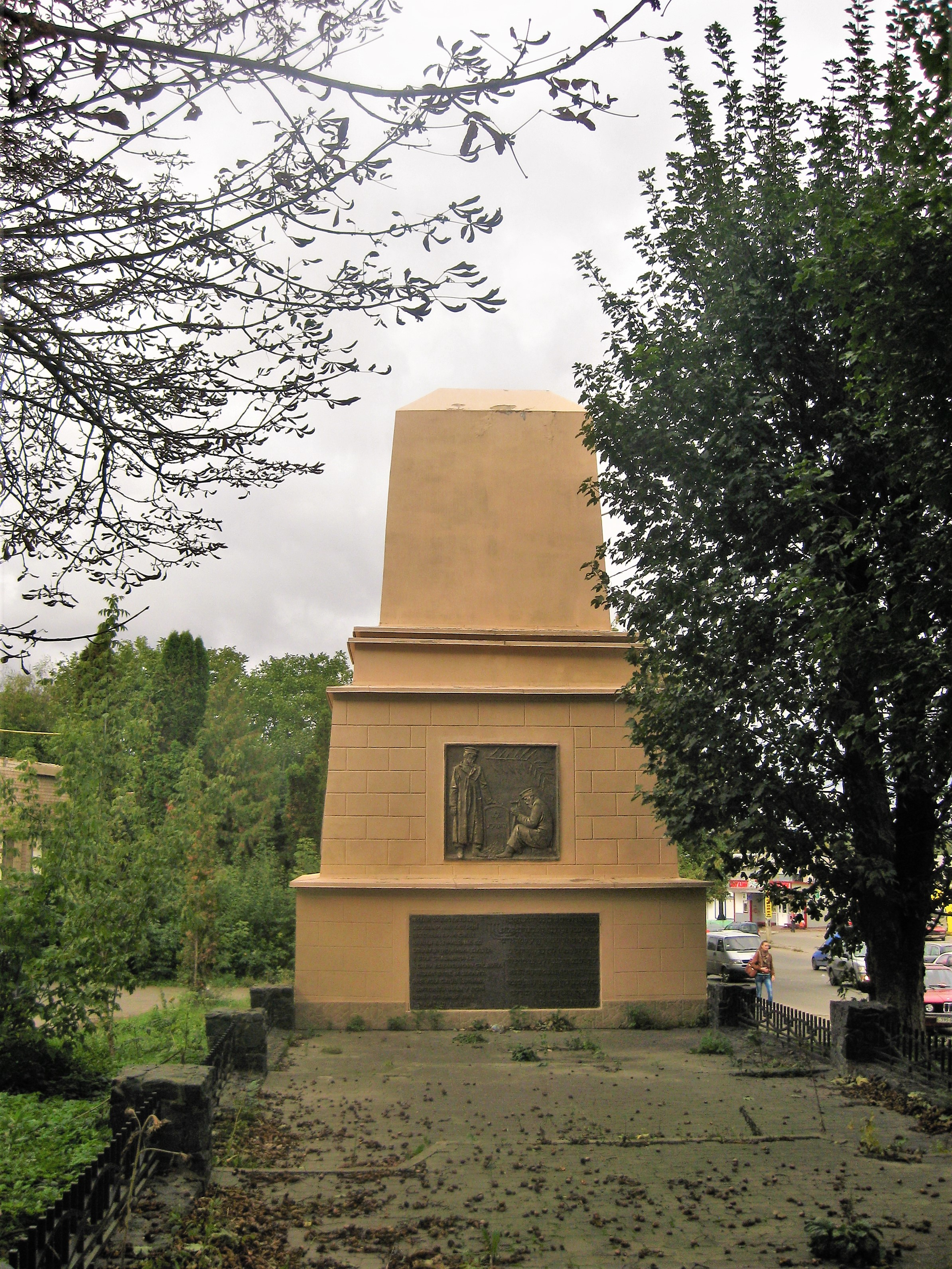
Monument to victims of the Proskurov pogrom in Khmelnytskyi.

The Whitaker Report of the United Nations cited the massacre of 100,000 to 250,000 Jews in more than 2,000 pogroms which occurred during the White Terror in Russia as an act of genocide. During the Russian Civil War, between 1918 and 1921, a total of 1,236 pogroms were committed against Jews in 524 towns in Ukraine. Estimates of the number of Jews who were killed in these pogroms range from 30,000 to 60,000. Of the recorded 1,236 pogroms and excesses, 493 of them were carried out by Ukrainian People's Republic soldiers who were under the command of Symon Petliura, 307 of them were carried out by independent Ukrainian warlords, 213 of them were carried out by Denikin's army, 106 of them were carried out by the Red Army and 32 of them were carried out by the Polish Army.

=== Decossackisation ===
During the Russian Civil War the Bolsheviks engaged in a genocidal campaign against the Don Cossacks. University of York Russian specialist Shane O'Rourke states that "ten thousand Cossacks were systematically slaughtered in a few weeks in January 1919" and he also states that this mass-slaughter "was one of the main factors which led to the disappearance of the Cossacks as a nation." The late Alexander Nikolaevich Yakovlev, head of the Presidential Committee for the Rehabilitation of Victims of Political Repression, notes that "hundreds of thousands of Cossacks were killed". Historian Robert Gellately claims that "the most reliable estimates indicate that between 300,000 and 500,000 were killed or deported in 1919–20" out of a population of around three million.

Peter Holquist states that the overall number of executions which were carried out is difficult to establish. In some regions hundreds were executed. In Khoper, the tribunal was very active, with a one-month total of 226 executions. The Tsymlianskaia tribunal oversaw the execution of over 700 people. The Kotel'nikovo tribunal executed 117 in early May and nearly 1,000 were executed overall. Others were not quite as active. The Berezovskaia tribunal made a total of twenty arrests in a community of 13,500 people. Holquist also notes that some of the White reports of Red atrocities in the Don were consciously scripted for agitation purposes. In one example, an insurgent leader reported that 140 were executed in Bokovskaia, but later provided a different account, according to which only eight people in Bokovskaia were sentenced to death, and the authorities did not manage to carry these sentences out. This same historian emphasises he is "not seeking to downplay or dismiss very real executions by the Soviets".

Research by Pavel Polian from the Russian Academy of Sciences on the subject of forced migrations in Russia shows that more than 45,000 Cossacks were deported from the Terek province to Ukraine. Their land was distributed among pro-soviet Cossacks and Chechens.

=== Ingrian Finns ===
The genocide of the Ingrian Finns (Finnish: Inkeriläisten kansanmurha) was a series of events triggered by the Russian Revolution in the 20th century, in which the Soviet Union deported, imprisoned and killed Ingrians and destroyed their culture. In the process, Ingria, in the historical sense of the word, ceased to exist. Before the persecution there were 140,000 to 160,000 Ingrians in Russia and today approximately 19,000 (including several thousand repatriated since 1990).

=== Joseph Stalin ===
Multiple documented instances of unnatural mass death occurred in the Soviet Union when it was under the rule of Joseph Stalin. The causes of these unnatural mass deaths include Union-wide famines in the early 1920s and early 1930s and deportations of ethnic minorities. Stalin declared a need to extract a "tribute" or a "tax" from the peasantry due to his factional struggles with the Bukharin wing of the party, peasant resistance to the NEP under Lenin, and the need for industrialisation. This idea was supported by most of the party in the 1920s. The tribute collected by the party took on the form of a virtual war against the peasantry that would lead to its cultural destruction and the relegating of the countryside to essentially a colony homogenised to the urban culture of the Soviet elite. This campaign of "colonising" the peasantry had its roots both in old Russian Imperialism and modern social engineering of the nation state yet with key differences to the latter such as Soviet repression reflecting more the weakness of said state rather than its strength. There have also been more selective discussions of collectivisation as a project of colonialism in regard to Ukraine and Kazakhstan. On 26 April 1991 the Supreme Soviet of the Russian Socialist Federal Soviet Republic, under its chairman Boris Yeltsin, passed the law On the Rehabilitation of Repressed Peoples with Article 2 denouncing all mass deportations as "Stalin's policy of defamation and genocide."

==== Holodomor ====
Memorial to victims of the Holodomor in Kharkiv.

During the Soviet famine of 1930–1933, Ukraine, Kazakhstan and some densely populated regions of Russia were all affected, but the highest number of deaths occurred in Ukraine. The events which occurred there are referred to as the Holodomor and they are also recognised as a genocide by multiple governments. The famine was caused by a variety of factors with different explanations for them depending on the opinion of the scholar. According to Simon Payaslian, the scholarly consensus classifies the Soviet famine (at least the famine in Ukraine) as a genocide, but some scholars say that it remains a significant issue in modern politics and they do not believe that Soviet policies would fall under the legal definition of genocide. Several scholars have disputed the belief that the famine was a genocidal act which was committed by the Soviet government, including J. Arch Getty, Stephen G. Wheatcroft, R. W. Davies, and Mark Tauger. Getty says that the "overwhelming weight of opinion among scholars working in the new archives ... is that the terrible famine of the 1930s was the result of Stalinist bungling and rigidity rather than some genocidal plan." Wheatcroft says that the Soviet government's policies during the famine were criminal acts of fraud and manslaughter, though not outright murder or genocide. While Wheatcroft rejects the genocide characterisation of the famine, he states that "the grain collection campaign was associated with the reversal of the previous policy of Ukrainisation."

A 2020 Journal of Genocide Research article by Oleh Wolowyna estimated a total of 8.7 million deaths across the entire Soviet Union, including 3.9 million in Ukraine, 3.3 million in Russia, and 1.3 million in Kazakhstan, plus a lower number in other republics. According to the All-Union census of 1926–1937, the rural population in the North Caucasus decreased by 24%. In the Kuban alone, from November 1932 to the spring of 1933, the number of documented victims of famine was 62,000. According to other historians, the real death toll is many times higher. For example, one paper estimates over 14% of the Krasnodar Oblast which roughly includes the Kuban perished due to the famine. The self-identification of the Ukrainian population of Kuban decreased from 915,000 in 1926, to 150,000 in 1939.

According to some scholars, collectivisation in the Soviet Union and the lack of favoured industries were the primary contributors to famine mortality (52% of excess deaths), and some evidence shows that ethnic Ukrainians and Germans were discriminated against. Lewis Siegelbaum, professor of History at Michigan State University, states that Ukraine was hit particularly hard by grain quotas which were set at levels which most farms could not produce. The 1933 harvest was poor, coupled with the extremely high quota level, which led to starvation conditions. The shortages were blamed on kulak sabotage, and authorities distributed what supplies were available only in the urban areas. According to a Centre for Economic Policy Research paper published in 2021 by Andrei Markevich, Natalya Naumenko, and Nancy Qian, regions with higher Ukrainian population shares were struck harder with centrally planned policies corresponding to famine, and Ukrainian populated areas were given lower amounts of tractors which were correlated to a reduction in famine mortality, ultimately concluding that 92% of famine deaths in Ukraine along with 77% of famine deaths in parts of Russia and Belarus can be explained by the fact that there was systematic bias against Ukrainians. The collectivisation and high procurement quota explanation for the famine is somewhat called into question by the fact that the oblasts of Ukraine with the highest losses being Kyiv and Kharkiv which produced far lower amounts of grain than other sections of the country. Oleh Wolowyna comments that peasant resistance and the ensuing repression of said resistance was a critical factor for the famine in Ukraine and parts of Russia populated by national minorities like Germans and Ukrainians allegedly tainted by "fascism and bourgeois nationalism" according to Soviet authorities.

Ukraine's Yuschenko administration recognised the Holodomor as an act of genocide and it also pressured international governments to do the same. This move was opposed by the Russian government and some members of the Ukrainian parliament, especially the Communists. A Ukrainian court found Joseph Stalin, Vyacheslav Molotov, Lazar Kaganovich, Genrikh Yagoda, Yakov Yakovlev, Stanislav Kosior, Pavel Postyshev, Vlas Chubar and Mendel Khatayevich posthumously guilty of genocide on 13 January 2010. As of 2010, the Russian government's official position was that the famine took place, but it was not an ethnic genocide; former Ukrainian president Viktor Yanukovych supported this position. A ruling of 12 January 2010 by Kyiv's Court of Appeal declared the Soviet leaders guilty of "genocide against the Ukrainian national group in 1932–33 through the artificial creation of living conditions intended for its partial physical destruction."

==== Kazakhstan ====
Some historians and scholars consider the Kazakh famine of 1930–1933 to have been a genocide of Kazakhs. The Soviet authorities undertook a campaign of persecution against the nomads in the Kazakhs, believing that the destruction of the class was a worthy sacrifice for the collectivisation of Kazakhstan. Europeans in Kazakhstan had disproportionate power in the party which has been argued as a cause of why indigenous nomads suffered the worst part of the collectivisation process rather than the European sections of the country. Regarding the Kazakh catastrophe, Michael Ellman states that it "seems to be an example of 'negligent genocide' which falls outside the scope of the UN Convention". However, historian Robert Kindler refuses to call the famine a genocide, claiming that doing so masks the culpability of lower-level cadres who were locally rooted among the Kazakhs themselves. Historian Sarah Cameron argues that while Stalin did not intend to starve Kazakhs, he did see some deaths as a necessary sacrifice to achieve the political and economic goals of the regime. However, Sarah Cameron believes that while the famine combined with a campaign against nomads was not genocide in the sense of the UN definition, it does comply with Raphael Lemkin's original concept of genocide, which considered destruction of culture to be as genocidal as physical annihilation. Historian Stephen Wheatcroft criticises this view because he believed that the high expectations of central planners were sufficient to demonstrate their ignorance of the ultimate consequences of their actions. Wheatcroft views the state's policies during the famine as criminal acts, though not as intentional murder or genocide. Niccolò Pianciola argues that from Raphael Lemkin's point of view on genocide, all nomads of the Soviet Union were victims of the crime, not just the Kazakhs. A monument for the famine's victims was constructed in 2017. The Turkic Council has described the famine as a "criminal Stalinist ethnic policy". A genocide remembrance day is held on 31 May for the victims of the famine.

==== Poles in the Soviet Union ====
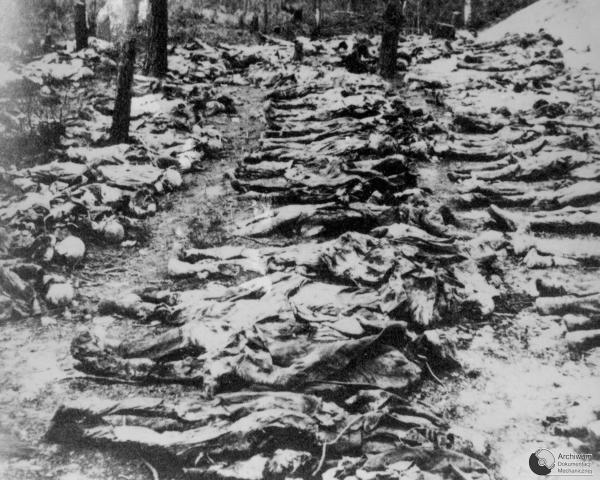
Photo from 1943 exhumation of mass grave of Polish officers killed by NKVD in the Katyn Forest in 1940

Several scholars write that the killing, on the basis of nationality and politics, of more than 120,000 ethnic Poles in the Soviet Union from 1937 to 1938 was genocide. An NKVD official remarked that Poles living in the Soviet Union were to be "completely destroyed". Under Stalin the NKVD's Polish operation soon arrested some 144,000, of whom 111,000 were shot and surviving family members deported to Kazakhstan.

According to historian Michael Ellman, "The 'national operations' of 1937–38, notably the 'Polish operation', may qualify as genocide as defined by the UN Convention, although there is as yet no legal ruling on the matter". Karol Karski argues that the Soviet actions against Poles are genocide according to international law. He says that while the extermination was targeting other nationalities as well and according to the criteria other than ethnicity, but as long as Poles were singled out basing on their ethnicity, that makes the actions to be genocide. The historian Terry Martin, refers to the "national operations", including the "Polish Operation", as ethnic cleansing and "ethnic terror". According to Martin, the singling out of diaspora nationalities for arrest and mass execution "verged on the genocidal". Historian Timothy Snyder called the Polish Operation genocidal: "It is hard not to see the Soviet "Polish Operation" of 1937–38 as genocidal: Polish fathers were shot, Polish mothers sent to Kazakhstan, and Polish children left in orphanages where they would lose their Polish identity. As more than 100,000 innocent people were killed on the spurious grounds that theirs was a disloyal ethnicity, Stalin spoke of "Polish filth"." Norman Naimark called Stalin's policy towards Poles in the 1930s "genocidal" but did not consider the entire Great Purge genocidal since it targeted political opponents as well. Simon Sebag Montefiore presents a similar opinion.

In practice abandoning its 'official socialist' ideology of the "fraternity of peoples", the Soviets in the Great Terror of 1937–1938 targeted "a national group as an enemy of the state." During their Polish operation against party enemies the NKVD hit "Soviet Poles and other Soviet citizens associated with Poland, Polish culture, or Roman Catholicism. The Polish ethnic character of the operation quickly prevailed in practice... ." Stalin was pleased at "cleaning out this Polish filth." Among the several different nationalities targeted in the Great Terror (e.g., Latvians, Estonians, Finns, Belarusians), "ethnic Poles suffered more than any other group." In 1940 the Soviets also killed thousands of Polish POWs, among about 22,000 Polish citizens shot in the Katyn forest and other places.

==== Chechens, Ingush, Balkars, Karachay, Kalmyks, Meskhetian Turks, and Volga Germans ====
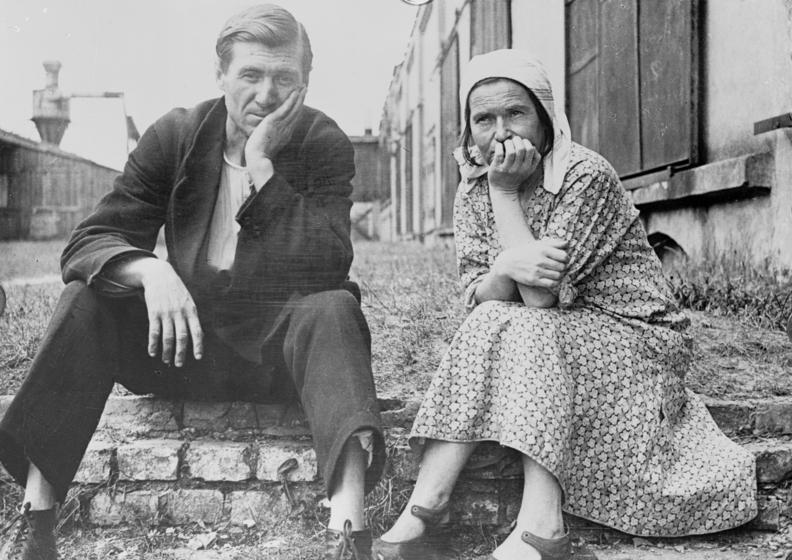
Ethnic Germans from the Volga region at a refugee camp in Schneidemühl, Germany, early 1920s.

The decree on the deportation of Volga Germans was published on 28 August 1941. Men aged 15–55 and later women between the ages of 16 and 45 were forced to work in the forests and mines of Siberia and Central Asia under conditions similar to those prevailing in the slave labor camps of the Gulag. The expulsion of the Germans from the Volga ended in January 1942. The number sent to Siberia and Kazakhstan totaled approximately 438,000. Together with 27,000 evicted in the same ethnic cleansing of the Stalingrad Oblast and 47,000 of the Saratov Oblast, the total number sent to forced internal exile was about 950,000, of which 30% died during deportation (285,000), and most never returned to the Volga Region.

On 26 February 2004 the plenary assembly of the European Parliament recognised the deportation of Chechen people during Operation Lentil (23 February 1944), as an act of genocide, on the basis of the 1907 IV Hague Convention: The Laws and Customs of War on Land and the CPPCG.

The event began on 23 February 1944, when the entire population of Checheno-Ingushetia was summoned to local party buildings where they were told they were to be deported as punishment for their alleged collaboration with the Germans. The inhabitants were rounded up and imprisoned in Studebaker trucks and sent to Siberia.

- Many times, resistance was met with slaughter, and in one such instance, in the aul of Khaibakh, about 700 people were locked in a barn and burned to death. By the next summer, Checheno-Ingushetia was dissolved; a number of Chechen and Ingush placenames were replaced with Russian ones; mosques and graveyards were destroyed, and a massive campaign to burn numerous historical Chechen texts was nearly complete. Many people from remote villages were executed per Lavrentiy Beria's verbal order that any Chechen or Ingush deemed 'untransportable should be liquidated' on the spot.
- Throughout the North Caucasus, about 700,000 people were deported (according to Dalkhat Ediev, 724,297, of which the majority, 412,548, were Chechens, along with 96,327 Ingush, 104,146 Kalmyks, 39,407 Balkars and 71,869 Karachais). Many died on the trip, of exposure in Siberia's extremely harsh environment. The NKVD, supplying the Russian perspective, gives the statistic of 144,704 killed in 1944–1948 alone (with a death rate of 23.5% for all groups). Estimates for Chechen deaths alone (excluding the NKVD statistic), range from about 130,000 to 200,000 thus ranging from over a quarter of the total Chechen population to nearly half being killed (of those that were deported, not counting those killed on the spot) in those 4 years alone.

==== Deportations of Estonians, Latvians, and Lithuanians ====
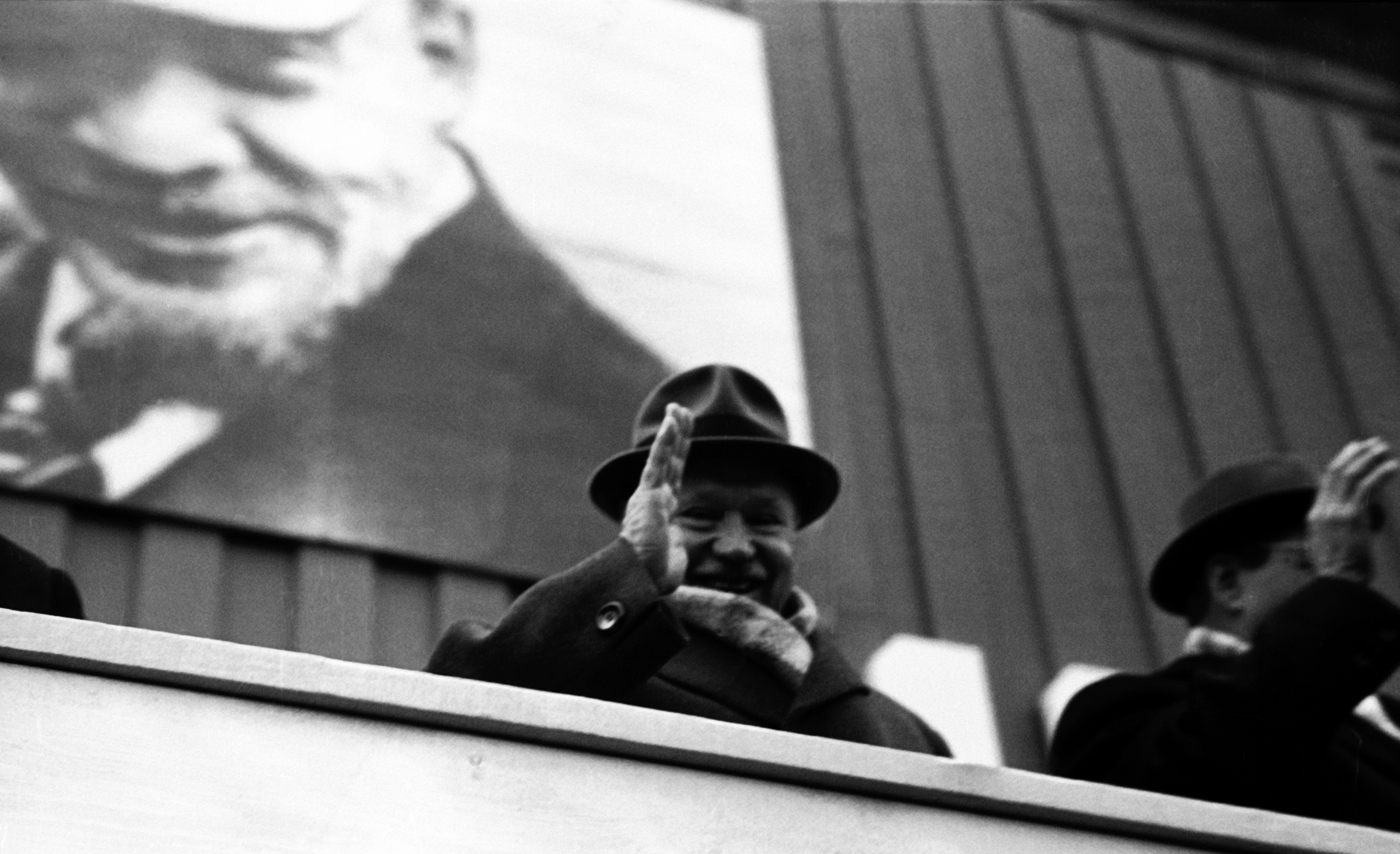
Antanas Sniečkus, the leader of the Communist Party of Lithuania, supervised the mass deportations of Lithuanians.

The mass deportations of up to 17,500 Lithuanians, 17,000 Latvians and 6,000 Estonians carried out by Stalin's government marked the start of another genocide. Added to the killing of the Forest Brethren and the renewed Dekulakization which followed the Soviet reconquest of the Baltic states at the end of World War II, the total number of people who were deported to Siberia consisted of 118,559 Lithuanians, 52,541 Latvians, and 32,540 Estonians. The high death rate of the deportees during their first few years in exile, caused by the failure of the Soviet authorities to provide them with suitable clothing and housing after they reached their destination, led some sources to label the affair an act of genocide. Based on the Martens Clause and the principles of the Nuremberg Charter, the European Court of Human Rights held that the March deportation constituted a crime against humanity. According to Erwin Oberlander, these deportations are a crime against humanity, rather than genocide.

Lithuania began holding trials for genocide in 1997. Latvia and Estonia followed in 1998. Latvia has since convicted four security officers and in 2003 it sentenced a former KGB agent to five years in prison. Estonia tried and convicted ten men and is investigating others. In Lithuania, by 2004, 23 cases were before the courts, but as of the end of the year none had been convicted.

In 2007 Estonia charged Arnold Meri (then 88 years old), a former Soviet Communist Party official and highly decorated former Red Army soldier, with genocide. Shortly after the trial opened, it was suspended because of Meri's frail health and then abandoned when he died. A memorial in Vilnius, Lithuania, is dedicated to genocidal victims of Stalin and Hitler, and the Museum of Genocide Victims in Lithuania, which opened on 14 October 1992 in the former KGB headquarters, chronicles the imprisonment and deportation of Lithuanians.

==== Crimean Tatars ====
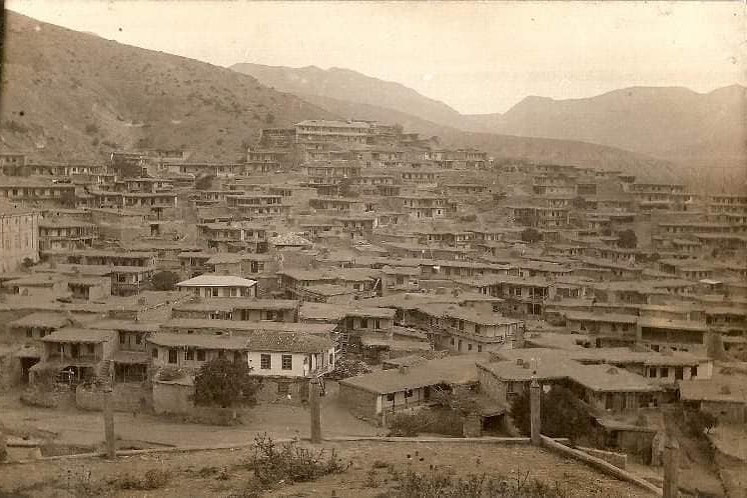
The empty Crimean Tatar village Üsküt, near Alushta, photo taken 1945 after the complete deportation of its inhabitants

The ethnic cleansing and deportation of the Crimean Tatars from Crimea was ordered by Joseph Stalin as a form of collective punishment for alleged collaboration with the Nazi occupation regime in Taurida Subdistrict during 1942–1943. The state-organised removal is known as the Sürgünlik in Crimean Tatar. A total of more than 230,000 people were deported (the entire ethnic Crimean Tatar population), of which more than 100,000 were killed via starvation or disease.

Many activists, politicians, scholars and historians go even further and consider this deportation a crime of genocide. Professor Lyman H. Legters argued that the Soviet penal system, combined with its resettlement policies, should count as genocidal since the sentences were borne most heavily specifically on certain ethnic groups, and that a relocation of these ethnic groups, whose survival depends on ties to its particular homeland, "had a genocidal effect remediable only by restoration of the group to its homeland". Soviet dissidents Ilya Gabay and Pyotr Grigorenko both classified the event as a genocide. Historian Timothy Snyder included it in a list of Soviet policies that "meet the standard of genocide."

On 12 December 2015, the Ukrainian Parliament issued a resolution recognising this event as genocide and established 18 May as the "Day of Remembrance for the victims of the Crimean Tatar genocide." The parliament of Latvia recognised the event as an act of genocide on 9 May 2019. The Parliament of Lithuania did the same on 6 June 2019. Canadian Parliament passed a motion on 10 June 2019, recognising the Crimean Tatar deportation of 1944 as a genocide perpetrated by Stalin, designating 18 May to be a day of remembrance.

== Transcarpathia ==
Genocide scholar Raz Segal considers the coercive Magyarisation policy and violent actions of Miklos Horthy's Kingdom of Hungary towards all inhabitants of Transcarpathia considered non-Hungarian (including Rusyns and Jews) to constitute a genocide.

== United States ==
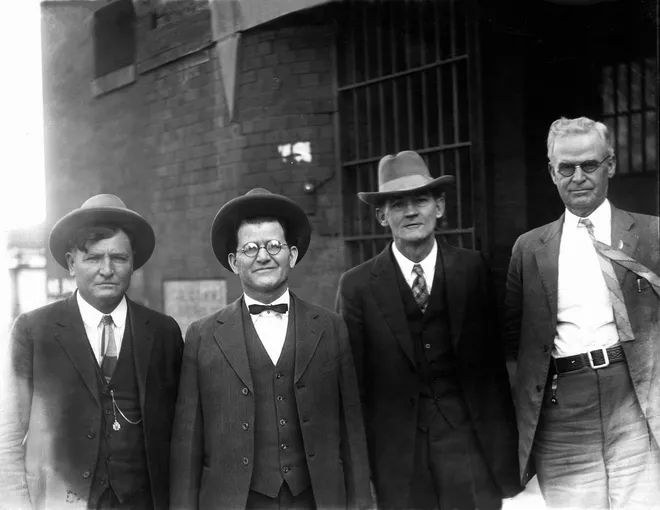
William Hale in 1926, second from the left, and John Ramsey, third from left, are flanked by two U.S. marshals.

The Osage Indian murders in the early 20th century was a plot by William King Hale and others to kill full-blood Osage to gain the mineral rights for their reservation. The events have been characterised as a genocide due to the intentions of its perpetrators to destroy the Osage nation. While some label the murders themselves as an instance of genocide, others include the murders in a longer process of genocide against the Osage nation. Estimates vary widely as to the percentage of the Osage nation killed in the murders, with the lowest estimate being 10% of 591 full-blood Osage being killed.

== Japan ==
=== Kantō Massacre ===
The Kantō Massacre was a mass murder which was committed in the Kantō region of Japan in the aftermath of the 1923 Great Kantō earthquake. With the explicit and implicit approval of parts of the Japanese government, the Japanese military, police, and vigilantes murdered an estimated 6,000 people: mainly ethnic Koreans, but also Chinese and Japanese people mistaken to be Korean, and Japanese communists, socialists, and anarchists.

=== Nanjing Massacre ===
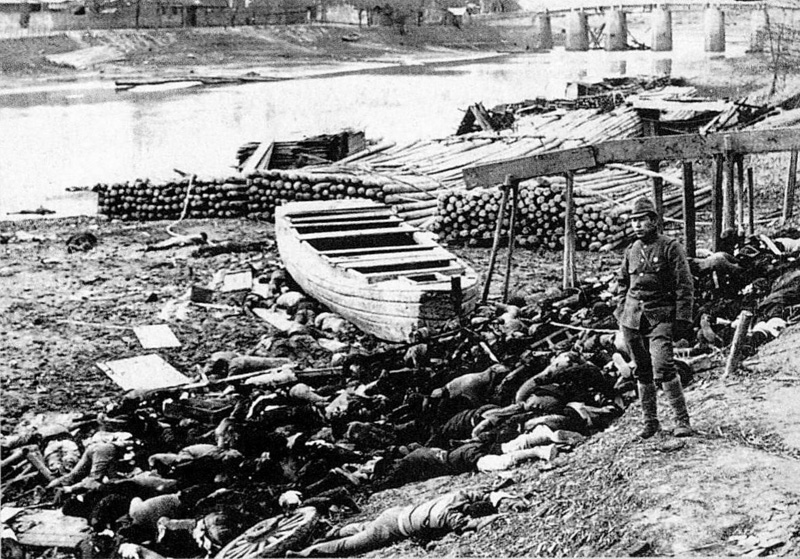
The corpses of massacred victims with a Japanese soldier standing nearby, Nanjing, 1937

During the Nanjing Massacre, which was committed during the early months of the Second Sino-Japanese War, the Japanese committed mass killings against the Chinese population of the city, during which at least 200,000 people were killed. Sociologist Bradley Campbell described the Nanjing Massacre as a genocide, because the Chinese were unilaterally killed en masse by the Japanese during the aftermath of the battle for the city, despite its successful and certain outcome. However, historian Jean-Louis Margolin does not believe that the Nanjing atrocities should be considered a genocide because only prisoners of war were executed in a systematic manner and the targeting of civilians was sporadic and done without orders by individual actors. Historian Yuki Tanaka argues that while the Japanese government did not endorse a clear policy of genocide, the military campaign in China was "undoubtedly genocidal", with Nanjing being a typical example of a genocidal massacre.

=== Three Alls policy ===
The Three Alls policy was a Japanese scorched earth policy adopted in China during World War II, the three "alls" being "kill all, burn all, loot all". This policy was designed as retaliation against the Chinese for the Communist-led Hundred Regiments Offensive in December 1940. According to American historian Herbert P. Bix, the prototype of the Three Alls policy policy were the "annihilation campaigns" launched in late 1938 by the North China Area Army to "pacify" the Hebei province, which was a hotbed of guerrilla resistance. Emperor Hirohito gave his approval of the "annihilation campaign" in an order he signed on 2 December 1938. In a study published in 1996, historian Mitsuyoshi Himeta claims that the Three Alls policy was both directly and indirectly responsible for the deaths of "more than 2.7 million" Chinese civilians.

=== Nanshitou massacre ===
The Nanshitou Massacre was a case large-scale unnatural deaths among the refugees detained by the Imperial Japanese Army and Wang Jingwei regime at the Nanshitou Refugee Camp in Guangzhou, China, between 1942 and 1945. The event was triggered by the Japanese expulsion of Chinese residents from Japanese-occupied Hong Kong in 1942, which resulted in refugees crowding into the city of Guangzhou by ferry along the Pearl River. They were stopped at Nanshitou for physical examinations. A former soldier of Unit 8604 stated that the unit was instructed to poison Chinese refugees with the pathogens of typhoid and paratyphoid, which they put into the thin porridge and drinking water prepared for the refugees, causing a large number of deaths. Additionally, survivors claimed that the Japanese used detainees for human experimentation.

=== Singapore ===
Sook Ching was a mass killing that occurred from 18 February to 4 March 1942 in Singapore after it fell to the Japanese. It was a systematic purge and massacre of anti-Japanese elements in Singapore, with the Singaporean Chinese particularly targeted by the Japanese military during the occupation. However, Japanese soldiers engaged in indiscriminate killing, and did not try to identify who was anti-Japanese. Retrospective analysis places the number killed at between 40,000 and 50,000.

=== Southeast Asia ===
Various atrocities were also committed during the Japanese colonial era, one example being the Manila massacre.

== Argentina ==
The Napalpí massacre occurred on 19 July 1924, in Napalpí a rural village in the Chaco Province of Northeast Argentina. It involved the massacre of 400 indigenous people of the Toba and Mocoví ethnicity by the Argentine Police and ranchers.

== Switzerland ==
Kinder der Landstrasse was a project implemented by the Swiss foundation Pro Juventute from 1926 to 1973. The aim of the project was to assimilate the itinerant Yenish people in Switzerland by institutionalising the parents and forcibly removing their children and placing them in orphanages or foster homes.

== Fascist Italy ==
=== Libya ===
The Second Italo-Senussi War, also known as the Pacification of Libya, or the Libyan Genocide, was a prolonged conflict in Italian Libya between Italian military forces and indigenous rebels associated with the Senussi Order that lasted from 1923 until 1932, after the principal Senussi leader, Omar Mukhtar, was captured and executed. The pacification resulted in the mass-death of the indigenous people of Cyrenaica—one quarter of Cyrenaica's entire population of 225,000 people died during the conflict. Italy committed major war crimes during the conflict; including the use of chemical weapons, the refusal to take prisoners of war and the execution rather than the capture of surrendering combatants, and mass executions of civilians. Italian authorities committed ethnic cleansing by forcibly expelling 100,000 Bedouin Cyrenaicans, half the population of Cyrenaica, from their settlements that were slated to be given to Italian settlers. In 2008, Italy apologised for its killing, destruction and repression of the Libyan people during the period of colonial rule, and it went on to say that its apology was a "complete and moral acknowledgement of the damage inflicted on Libya by Italy during the colonial era."

=== Ethiopia ===
The Second Italo-Ethiopian War, also referred to as the Second Italo-Abyssinian War, was a war of aggression which was fought between Italy and Ethiopia from October 1935 to February 1937. In Ethiopia it is often referred to simply as the Italian Invasion (Amharic: ጣልያን ወረራ, romanized: Ṭalyan warära), and in Italy as the Ethiopian War (Italian: Guerra d'Etiopia). It is seen as an example of the expansionist policy that characterised the Axis powers and the ineffectiveness of the League of Nations before the outbreak of the Second World War. By all estimates, hundreds of thousands of Ethiopian civilians died as a result of the Italian invasion, which have been described by some historians as constituting genocide, and by others as "bordering on genocide".

== El Salvador ==
La Matanza (Spanish for 'The Massacre') refers to a large scale government killings in western El Salvador following a communist-indigenous rebellion that took place between 22 and 25 January 1932. After the revolt was suppressed, which resulted in the deaths of 10,000 to 40,000 people.

== Kingdom of Iraq ==
The Simele massacre was a massacre committed by the armed forces of the Kingdom of Iraq during a campaign which systematically targeted the Assyrian Christian population of northern Iraq in August 1933. The term is not only used in reference to the massacre which occurred in Simele, it is also used in reference to the killing spree which occurred in 63 Assyrian villages in the Dohuk and Mosul districts and caused the death of between 5,000 and 6,000 Assyrians.

The Simele massacre inspired Raphael Lemkin to invent the concept of genocide. In 1933, Lemkin delivered a presentation to the Legal Council of the League of Nations conference on international criminal law in Madrid, for which he prepared an essay on the Crime of Barbarity as a crime against international law. The concept of the "crime of barbarity" evolved into the idea of genocide, and it was based on the Simele massacre, Armenian genocide, and later the Holocaust.

== Spain ==
During the Spanish Civil War and the rule of Francisco Franco, Spain engaged in a mass campaign of political repression. The religious nature of the repression, such as republicans and leftists being portrayed as atheists to justify their persecution, has led some scholars to describe the campaign as genocidal.

== Dominican Republic ==
In 1937, Dominican dictator Rafael Trujillo ordered the execution of Haitians who were living in the Dominican Republic. The Parsley massacre, known as "El Corte" (the Cutting) in the Dominican Republic, lasted approximately five days. The name of the massacre comes from claims that soldiers used a Shibboleth to identify suspected Haitians, showing them parsley leaves and asking them to pronounce the name of the plant. Spanish-speaking Dominicans would be able to pronounce the Spanish word for parsley ("perejil") correctly, whereas native Haitian Creole speakers would struggle to pronounce the 'r' adequately. Those who mispronounced "perejil" were assumed to be Haitian and slaughtered. The massacre resulted in the deaths of 20,000 to 30,000 people.

== Republic of China and Tibet ==
In the 1930s, the Kuomintang's Republic of China government supported Muslim warlord Ma Bufang when he launched seven expeditions into Golog, causing the deaths of thousands of Tibetans. Uradyn Erden Bulag called the events that followed genocidal, while David Goodman called them ethnic cleansing. One Tibetan counted the number of times Ma attacked him, remembering the seventh attack that made life impossible. Ma was anti-communist and he and his army wiped out many Tibetans in northeast and eastern Qinghai and they also destroyed Tibetan Buddhist Temples. Ma also patronised the Panchen Lama, who was exiled from Tibet by the Dalai Lama's government.

== Nazi Germany and Nazi-occupied Europe ==
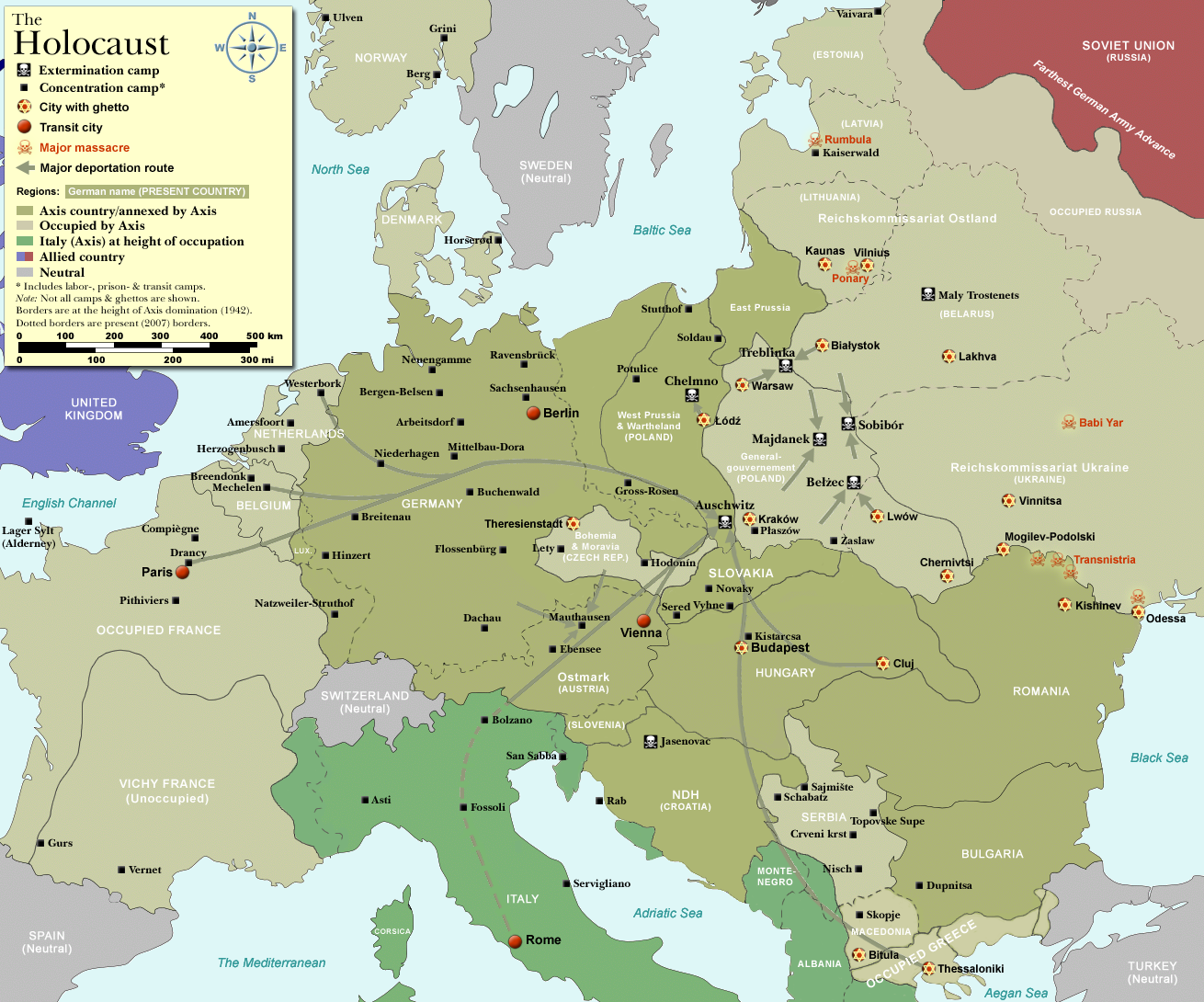
Major deportation routes to the extermination camps in German-occupied Europe.

=== The Holocaust ===
Year	Jews killed
1933–1940	under 100,000
1941	1,100,000
1942	2,700,000
1943	500,000
1944	600,000
1945	100,000

The Holocaust is widely recognised as a genocide. The term "genocide" appeared in the indictment of 24 German leaders. Count three of the indictment stated that all of the defendants had "conducted deliberate and systematic genocide – namely, the extermination of racial and national groups...."

The term "Holocaust" (derived from the Greek words hólos, "whole" and kaustós, "burnt") is often used to describe the killing of approximately six million European Jews, as part of a program of deliberate extermination which was planned and executed by the National Socialist German Workers Party in Germany, which was led by Adolf Hitler. Many scholars do not include other groups in the definition of the Holocaust, because they choose to limit it to the genocide of the Jews.

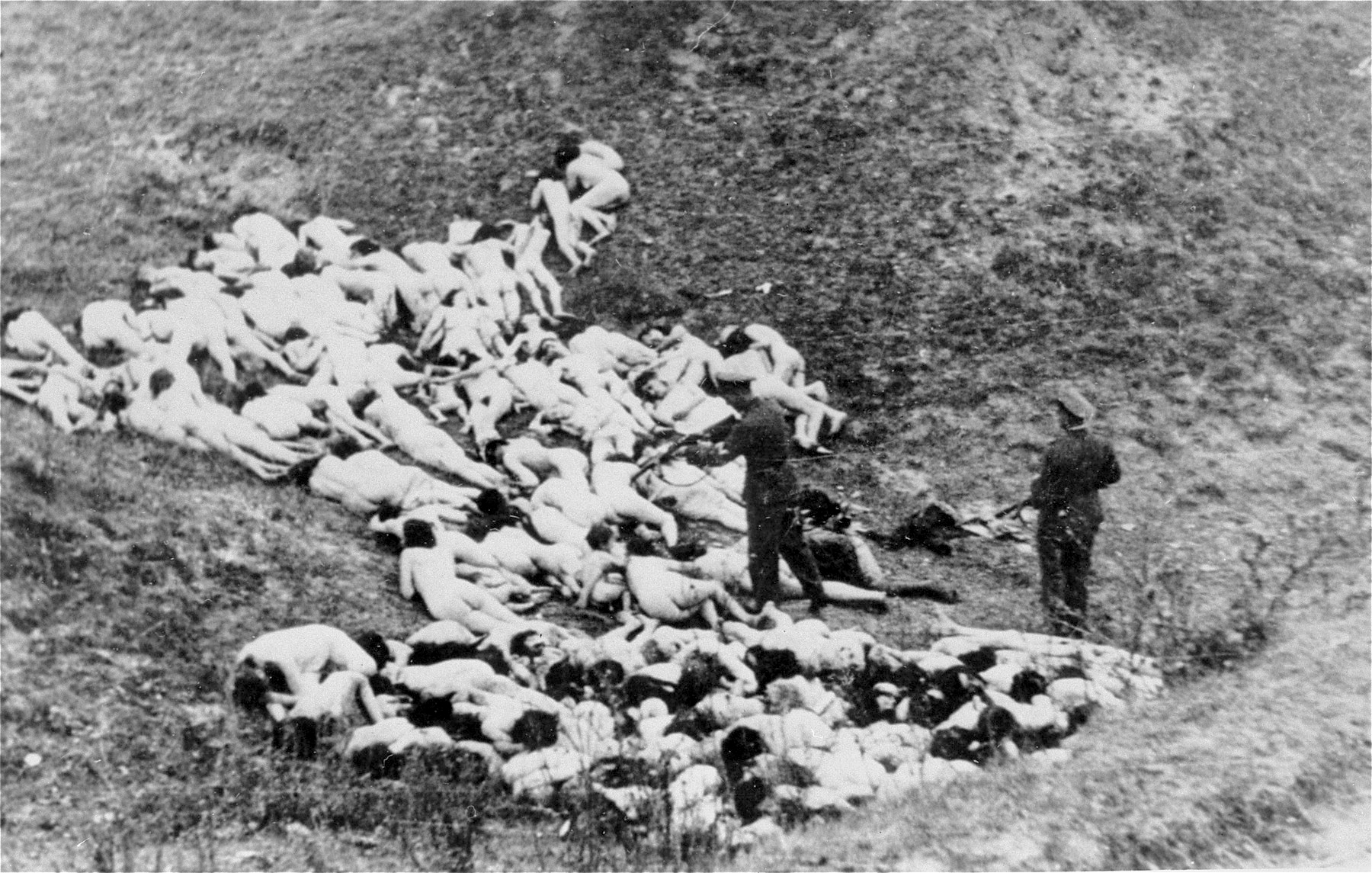
German police shooting women and children outside the Mizocz Ghetto, 14 October 1942

The Holocaust was accomplished in stages. Legislation to remove the Jews from civil society was enacted years before the outbreak of World War II. Concentration camps were established in which inmates were used as slave laborers and murdered through over-work. When Nazi Germany conquered new territories in Eastern Europe, specialised units which were called Einsatzgruppen murdered Jews and political opponents in mass shootings. Jews and Romani people were crammed into ghettos before they were crammed into box cars and transported to extermination camps by freight train where, if they survived the journey, the majority of them were murdered in gas chambers. Every arm of Germany's bureaucracy was involved in the logistics of the mass murder, turning the country into what one Holocaust scholar has called "a genocidal nation."

Extermination Camp	Estimate of number killed	Ref
Auschwitz-Birkenau	1,000,000	
Treblinka	870,000	
Belzec	600,000	
Majdanek	79,000–235,000	
Chełmno	320,000	
Sobibór	250,000	

The following figures by Lucy Dawidowicz show the annihilation of the Jewish population of Europe by (pre-war) country:
Country	Estimated Pre-War Jewish population	Estimated killed	Percent killed
Poland	3,300,000	3,000,000	90
Baltic countries	253,000	228,000	90
Germany and Austria	240,000	210,000	87.5
Bohemia and Moravia	90,000	80,000	89
Slovakia	90,000	75,000	83
Greece	70,000	54,000	77
Netherlands	140,000	105,000	75
Hungary	650,000	450,000	70
Byelorussian SSR	375,000	245,000	65
Ukrainian SSR	1,500,000	900,000	60
Belgium	65,000	40,000	60
Yugoslavia	43,000	26,000	60
Romania	600,000	300,000	50
Norway	2,173	890	41
France	350,000	90,000	26
Bulgaria	64,000	14,000	22
Italy	40,000	8,000	20
Luxembourg	5,000	1,000	20
Russian SFSR	975,000	107,000	11
Denmark	8,000	52	<1
Total	8,861,800	5,933,900	67

This list gives a total of over 3.8 million; of these, 80–90% were estimated to have been Jews. These seven camps thus accounted for half of the total number of Jews who were murdered in the entire Nazi Holocaust. Virtually the entire Jewish population of Poland was murdered in these camps.

Since 1945, the most commonly cited figure for the total number of Jews who were murdered has been six million. The Yad Vashem Holocaust Martyrs' and Heroes' Remembrance Authority in Jerusalem, writes that there is no precise figure for the number of murdered Jews, but it has been able to find documentation of more than three million names of Jewish victims, which it displays at its visitors center. The figure most commonly used is the six million attributed to Adolf Eichmann, a senior SS official. (Note: Wilhelm Höttl, an SS officer and a Doctor of History, testified at the Nuremberg Trials and Eichmann's trial that at a meeting he had with Eichmann in Budapest in late August 1944, "Eichmann ... told me that, according to his information, some 6,000,000 (six million) Jews had perished until then – 4,000,000 (four million) in extermination camps and the remaining 2,000,000 (two million) through shooting by the Operations Units and other causes, such as disease, etc.")

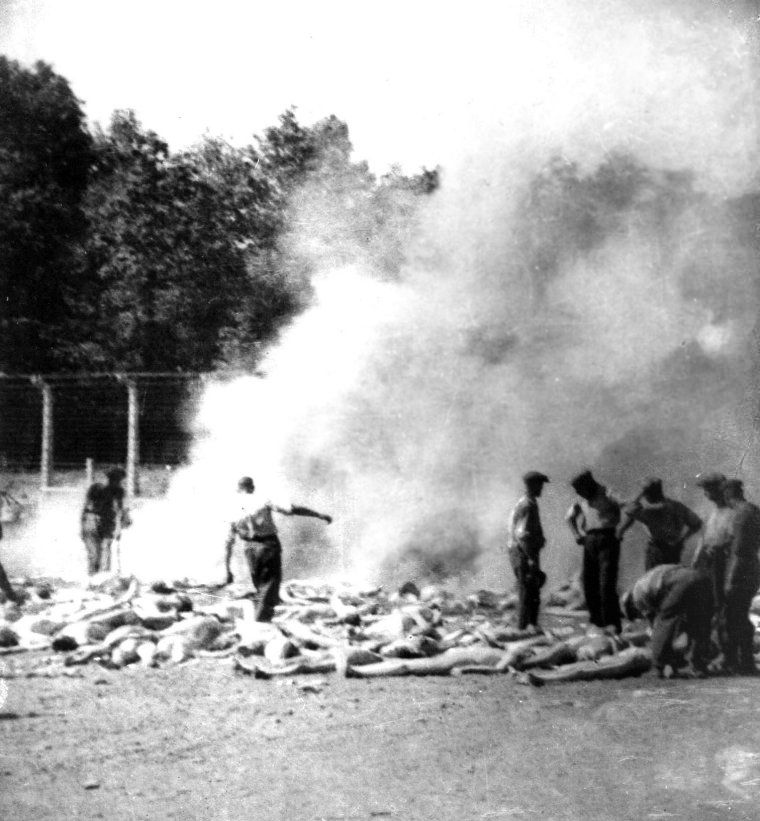
Members of the Sonderkommando burn corpses in the fire pits at Auschwitz II-Birkenau.

There were about eight to ten million Jews in the territories controlled directly or indirectly by Germany (the uncertainty arises from the lack of knowledge about how many Jews there were in the Soviet Union). The six million murdered in the Holocaust thus represent 60 to 75 percent of these Jews. Of Poland's 3.3 million Jews, about 90 percent were murdered. The same proportion were murdered in Latvia and Lithuania, but most of Estonia's Jews were evacuated in time. Of the 750,000 Jews in Germany and Austria in 1933, only about a quarter survived. Although many German Jews emigrated before 1939, the majority of these fled to Czechoslovakia, France or the Netherlands, from where they were later deported and murdered.

In Czechoslovakia, Greece, the Netherlands, and Yugoslavia (whose territories were divided into the German-Italian Puppet state Independent State of Croatia run by the Ustaše and the German Occupied Territory of the Military Commander in Serbia governed by Milan Nedić's Government of National Salvation), over 70 percent were murdered. In The Independent State of Croatia, Ustaše and the German Army carried out extermination of Jews as well as Roma in Ustaše-run concentration camps like Jasenovac, while a considerable number of Jews were rounded up by the Ustaše, who turned them over to the Germans, who exterminated them in Nazi Germany. In the Territory of the Military Commander in Serbia, the German Army carried out the extermination of Jews as well as Roma with support and assistance from Milan Nedić's regime and Dimitrije Ljotić's fascist organisation Yugoslav National Movement (Zbor), who had joint control over the Banjica concentration camp with the German Army in Belgrade. 50 to 70 percent were murdered in Romania, Belgium and Hungary. It is likely that a similar proportion were killed in Belarus and Ukraine, but these figures are less certain. Countries with notably lower proportions of deaths include Bulgaria, Denmark, France, Italy, and Norway. Albania was the only country occupied by Germany that had a significantly larger Jewish population in 1945 than in 1939. About two hundred native Jews and over a thousand refugees were provided with false documents, hidden when necessary, and generally treated as honored guests in the country. Additionally, Japan, as an Axis member, implemented its own unique response to German policies regarding Jews; see Shanghai Ghetto.

In addition to the Jews who died in extermination camps, another 800,000 to one million Jews were murdered by the Einsatzgruppen in the occupied Soviet territories (an approximate figure, since the Einsatzgruppen murders were frequently undocumented). Many more died through execution or of disease and malnutrition in the ghettos of Poland before they could be deported.

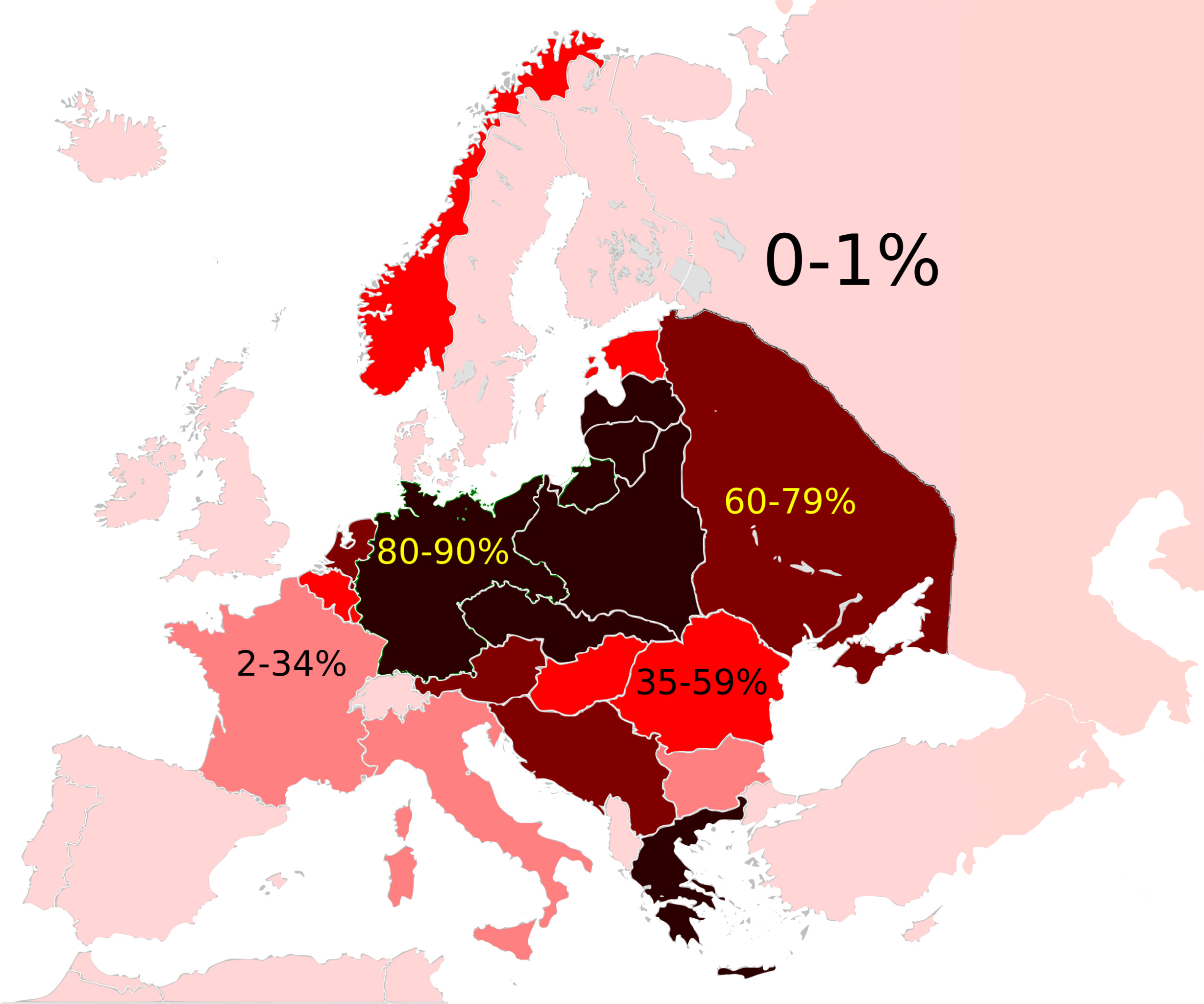
Holocaust death toll as a percentage of the total pre-war Jewish population in Europe

In the 1990s, the opening of government archives in Eastern Europe resulted in the adjustment of the death tolls which were published in the pioneering works by Hilberg, Dawidowicz and Gilbert (e.g. compare Gilbert's estimation of two million deaths in Auschwitz-Birkenau with the updated figure of one million in the Extermination Camp data box). As pointed out above, Wolfgang Benz has been carrying out work on the more recent data. He concluded in 1999:

The goal of annihilating all of the Jews of Europe, as it was proclaimed at the conference in the villa Am Grossen Wannsee in January 1942, was not reached. Yet the six million murder victims make the holocaust a unique crime in the history of mankind. The number of victims—and with certainty the following represent the minimum number in each case—cannot express that adequately. Numbers are just too abstract. However they must be stated in order to make clear the dimension of the genocide: 165,000 Jews from Germany, 65,000 from Austria, 32,000 from France and Belgium, more than 100,000 from the Netherlands, 60,000 from Greece, the same number from Yugoslavia, more than 140,000 from Czechoslovakia, half a million from Hungary, 2.2 million from the Soviet Union, and 2.7 million from Poland. To these numbers must be added all those killed in the pogroms and massacres in Romania and Transitrien (over 200,000) and the deported and murdered Jews from Albania and Norway, Denmark and Italy, from Luxembourg and Bulgaria.

— Benz, Wolfgang The Holocaust: A German Historian Examines the Genocide

=== Non-Jewish victims ===
Victims	Killed	Source
Jews	5.93 million	
Soviet POWs	2–3 million	
Ethnic Poles	1.8–2 million	
Serbs	200,000—500,000	
Disabled	270,000	
Romani	90,000–220,000	
Freemasons	80,000–200,000	
Homosexuals	5,000–15,000	
Jehovah's; Witnesses	2,500–5,000	
Spanish Republicans	7,000	

Some scholars broaden the definition of the Holocaust by including other German killing policies which were carried out during the war, including the mistreatment of Soviet POWs, crimes against ethnic Poles, the mass murder of mentally and physically disabled Germans (which the Nazi authorities framed as "euthanasia"), persecution of Jehovah's Witnesses, the genocide of Romani, and other crimes which the Nazis committed against ethnic, sexual, and political minorities. Using this definition, the total number of Holocaust victims is 11 million people. Donald Niewyk suggests that the broadest definition, including Soviet deaths due to war-related famine and disease, would produce a death toll of 17 million. Overall, about 5.7 million (78 percent) of the 7.3 million Jews in occupied Europe perished. This was in contrast to the five to 11 million (1.4 percent to 3.0 percent) of the 360 million non-Jews in German-dominated Europe. The United States Holocaust Memorial Museum has the number of people murdered during the Holocaust era at over 12 million.

==== Romani people ====
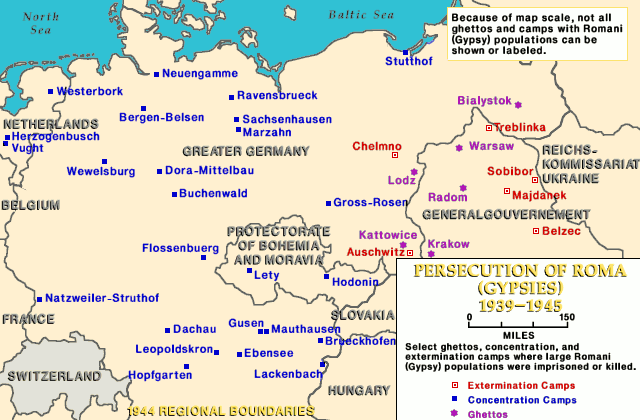
Map of persecution of the Roma

The treatment of the Romani people was not consistent in the different areas that Nazi Germany conquered. In some areas (e.g. Luxembourg and the Baltic countries), the Nazis murdered virtually the entire Romani population. In other areas (e.g. Denmark and Greece), there is no record of Romanis being subjected to mass murder.

Donald Niewyk and Frances Nicosia write that the death toll was at least 130,000 out of the nearly one million Romani who resided in Nazi-controlled Europe. Michael Berenbaum writes that serious scholarly estimates lie between 90,000 and 220,000. A study by Sybil Milton, senior historian at the U.S. Holocaust Memorial Museum, calculated at least 220,000 and possibly closer to 500,000 victims, but this study explicitly excluded the Roma who were murdered in Romania and Yugoslavia (Serbia, Croatia, Bosnia) where the genocide of Romanies was intense. Martin Gilbert estimated a total of more than 220,000 deaths out of the 700,000 Romani who lived in Europe. Ian Hancock, Director of the Program of Romani Studies and the Romani Archives and Documentation Center at the University of Texas at Austin, has argued in favor of a much higher figure of between 500,000 and 1,500,000 deaths, claiming that the Romani death toll proportionally equaled or exceeded that of Jewish victims.

==== Slavic population of the Soviet Union ====
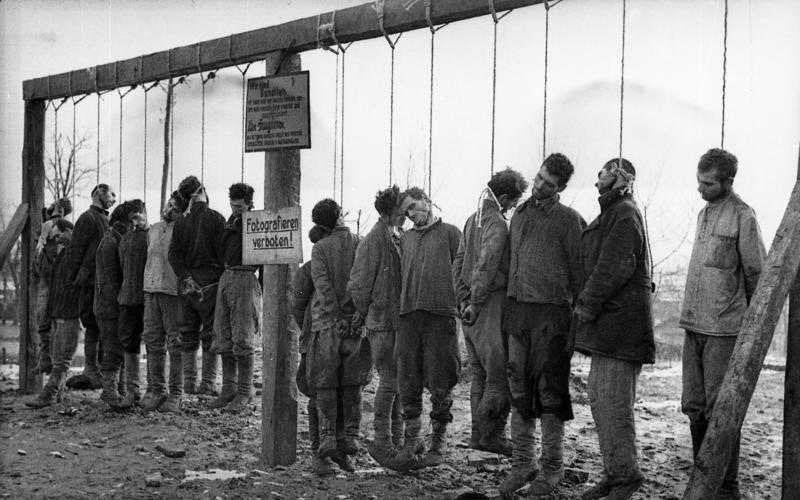
Men hanged as partisans somewhere in the Soviet Union.

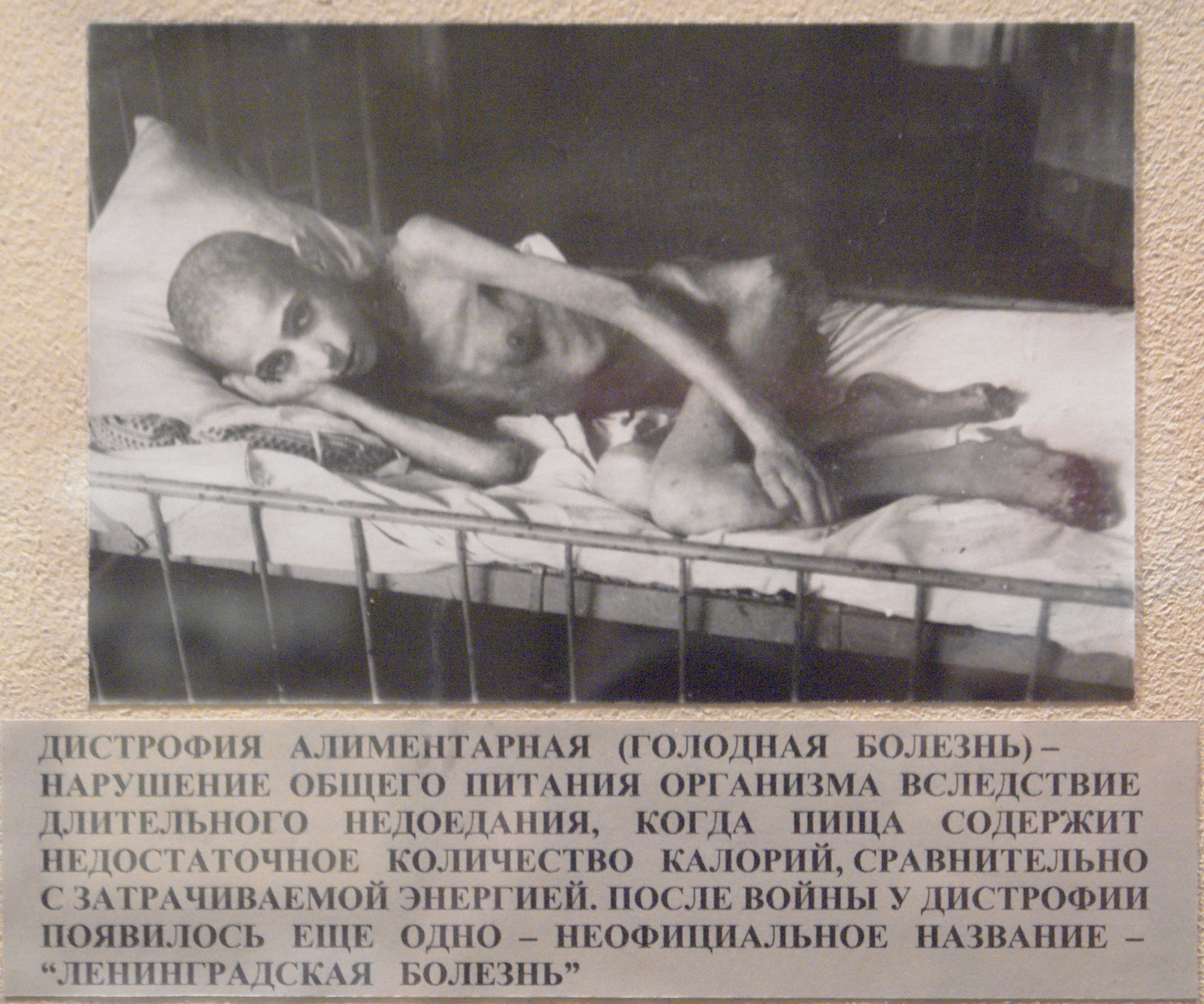
A victim of starvation in besieged Leningrad in 1941

The Nazi German government implemented Generalplan Ost which was part of its plan for the colonisation of Central and Eastern Europe. Implementation of the plan necessitated genocide and ethnic cleansing which was to be undertaken on a vast scale in the territories which were occupied by Germany during World War II. The plan entailed the enslavement, expulsion, and the partial extermination of most Slavic peoples in Europe, peoples whom the Nazis considered racially inferior and non-Aryan. The programme operational guidelines, which were prepared in the years 1939–1942, were based on the policy of Lebensraum which was designed by Adolf Hitler and the Nazi movement, as well as being a fulfillment of the Drang nach Osten (English: Drive towards the East) ideology of German expansion to the east. As such, it was intended to be a part of the New Order in Europe.

The civilian death toll in the regions which were occupied by Germany was estimated to be 13.7 million. Philimoshin cited sources from the Soviet era to support his figures, he used the terms "genocide" and "premeditated extermination" when he referred to the deaths of 7.4 million civilians in the occupied USSR which were caused by the direct, intentional actions of violence. Civilians killed in reprisals during the Soviet partisan war account for a major part of the huge toll. The report of Philimoshin lists the deaths of civilian forced laborers in Germany as totaling 2,164,313. G. I. Krivosheev in the report on military casualties gives a total of 1,103,300 dead POWs. The total of these two figures is 3,267,613, which is close to estimates by western historians of about 3 million deaths of prisoners in German captivity. In the occupied regions Nazi Germany implemented a policy of forced confiscation of food which resulted in the famine deaths of an estimated 6% of the population, 4.1 million persons.

Nazi Germany also engaged in a policy of deliberate maltreatment of Soviet prisoners of war (POWs), in contrast to their treatment of British and American POWs. This policy, which amounted to deliberately starving and working to death Soviet POWs, was grounded in Nazi racial theory, which depicted Slavs as sub-humans. Estimates place the number of Soviet POWs who died at 3.3 million to 3.5 million out of the 5.5 million imprisoned by Nazi Germany.

Some historians and the Russian government have classified the Siege of Leningrad, in which German and Finnish policies led to the deaths of more than 1 million civilians from starvation, as a genocide.

Soviet Civilian loses, Russian Academy of Science estimates
Deaths caused by the result of direct, intentional actions of violence	7,420,379
Deaths of forced laborers in Germany	2,164,313
Deaths due to famine and disease in the occupied regions	4,100,000
Total	13,684,692

==== Poland ====
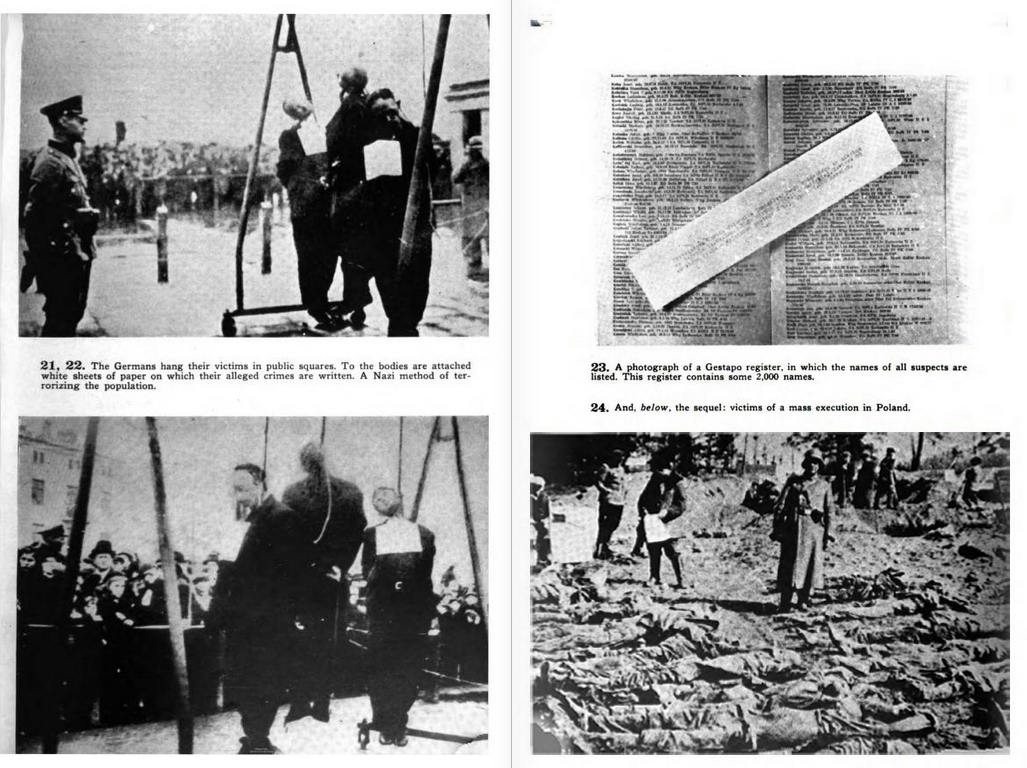
Photos from The Black Book of Poland, published in London in 1942 by Polish government-in-exile.

The Intelligenzaktion ("anti-intelligentsia action") was a highly secretive genocidal action of Nazi Germany against Polish elites (primarily intelligentsia; teachers, doctors, priests, community leaders etc.) in the early stages of World War II. It was conducted as part of an attempt to complete the Germanisation of the western regions of occupied Poland before their planned annexation. The operation cost the lives of 100,000 Poles according to the Institute of National Remembrance.

Adolf Hitler believed that the Polish elites might inspire the Poles to disobey their new German masters so he decreed that they had to be eliminated beforehand. The aim was the elimination of Polish society's elite, which was very broadly defined as: Polish nobles, intelligentsia, teachers, entrepreneurs, social workers, military veterans, members of national organisations, priests, judges, political activists, and anyone who had attended secondary school. It was continued by the German AB-Aktion operation in Poland in the spring and summer of 1940, which saw the massacre of Lwów professors and the execution of about 1,700 Poles in the Palmiry forest. Several thousand civilians were executed or imprisoned. The Einsatzgruppen were also responsible for the indiscriminate murder of Poles during the 1941 German invasion of the Soviet Union.

Our strength is our quickness and our brutality.... I have given the order—and will have everyone shot who utters but one word of criticism—that the aim of this war does not consist in reaching certain geographical lines, but in the enemies' physical elimination. Thus, for the time being only in the east, I put ready my Death's Head units, with the order to kill without pity or mercy all men, women, and children of the Polish race or language... Adolf Hitler, Obersalzberg Speech, given on 22 August 1939, a week before the invasion

==== Volhynia and Eastern Galicia ====
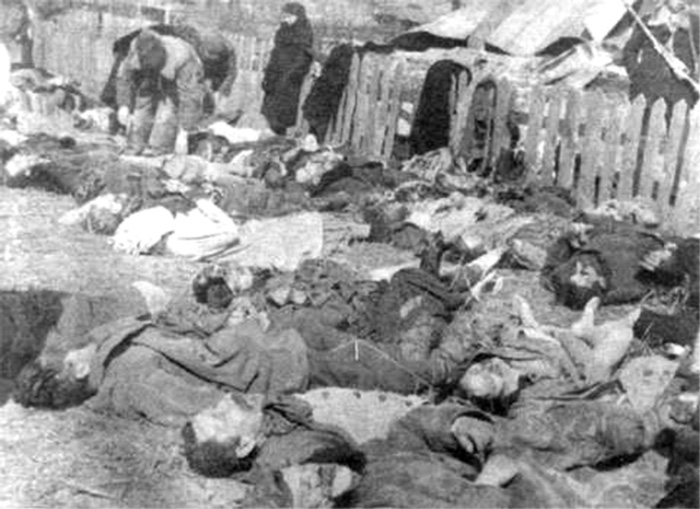
Massacres of Poles in Volhynia in 1943. Most Poles of Volhynia (now in Ukraine) had either been murdered or had fled the area

The massacres of Poles in Volhynia and Eastern Galicia were part of an ethnic cleansing operation carried out by the Ukrainian Insurgent Army (UPA) West in the Nazi-occupied regions of Eastern Galicia (Nazi created Distrikt Galizien in General Government), and UPA North in Volhynia (in Nazi created Reichskommissariat Ukraine), from March 1943 until the end of 1944. The peak took place in July/August 1943 when a senior UPA commander, Dmytro Klyachkivsky, ordered the liquidation of the entire male Polish population between 16 and 60 years of age. Despite this, most were women and children. The UPA murdered 40,000–60,000 Polish civilians in Volhynia, from 25,000 to 30,000–40,000 in Eastern Galicia. The murders were directly linked with the policies of the Bandera fraction of the Organisation of Ukrainian Nationalists, whose goal, specified at the Second Conference of the OUN-B, was to remove non-Ukrainians from a future Ukrainian state.

In Poland, the massacres were recognised as a campaign of ethnic cleansing with "marks of genocide". According to IPN prosecutor Piotr Zając, the crimes were "crimes of genocide". On 22 July 2016, the Parliament of Poland passed a resolution declaring 11 July a National Day of Remembrance to honor the Polish victims murdered by Ukrainian nationalists, and formally calling the massacres a "genocide".

==== Serbs in the Independent State of Croatia ====
After the Nazi invasion of Yugoslavia on 6 April 1941, Croatian Nazis and fascists who were known as the Ustaše established a clerical fascist regime which was known as the Nezavisna Država Hrvatska (Independent State of Croatia) or the NDH. Immediately afterwards, the Ustashe launched a genocidal campaign against Serbs, Jews and Romani people who lived inside the borders of the NDH. The Ustaše's view of national and racial identity, as well as the theory that the Serbs constituted an inferior race, was influenced by anti-Eastern Orthodox sentiment, anti-Serb sentiment and the works of Croatian nationalists and intellectuals which were written from the end of the 19th century to the beginning of the 20th century. The Ustaše enacted a policy which called for a solution to the "Serbian problem" in Croatia. The solution, as it was promulgated by Mile Budak, was to "kill one-third of the Serbs, expel one-third, and convert one-third (to Roman Catholicism)." Historian Michael Phayer explained that the Nazis' decision to murder all of Europe's Jews is estimated by some to have begun in the latter half of 1941, specifically in late June, which, if correct, would mean that the genocide in Croatia began before the Final Solution.

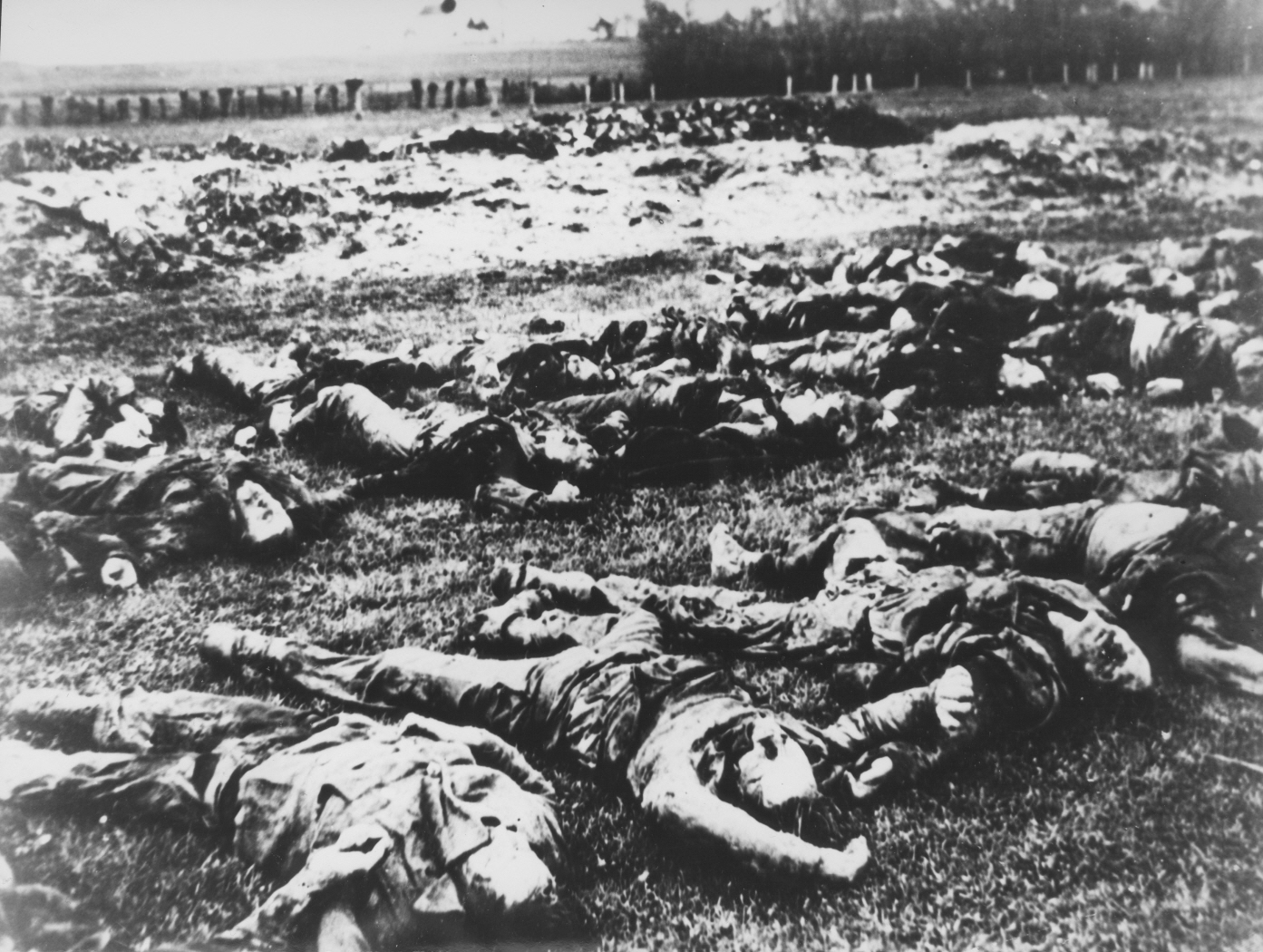
Bodies of victims of the Gudovac massacre during the Genocide of Serbs

From 1941 to 1945, the Ustaše regime killed at least 200,000 to 500,000 Serbs, It is estimated that in the infamous Jasenovac concentration camp alone, which was notorious for its high mortality rate (higher than the mortality rate at Auschwitz) and the barbaric practices which occurred in it, approximately 100,000 people were murdered. The Independent State of Croatia was the only Axis installed puppet state which erected children's concentration camps. Serbs who lived in the NDH suffered one of the highest casualty rates in Europe during World War II, while the NDH was one of the most lethal regimes which existed during the 20th century. Historian Stanley G. Payne claimed that the direct and indirect executions which were carried out by the NDH regime were an "extraordinary mass crime", which in proportionate terms exceeded the crimes which were committed by any other European regime besides Hitler's Third Reich, while Jonathan Steinberg stated that the crimes which were committed against Serbs who lived in the NDH were the "earliest total genocide to be attempted during World War II." Payne added that the crimes which were committed in the NDH were only proportionately surpassed by the crimes which were committed by the Khmer Rouge in Cambodia and the crimes which were committed by several of the extremely genocidal African regimes.

==== Serbs in Montenegro ====
The Genocide in Piva and Velika was the genocide of 522 Serb civilians by the 7th SS Volunteer Mountain Division Prinz Eugen, along with Croatian Ustaše and the SS Handschar Division on 7 June 1943 in the village of Doli Plivski, Montenegro, near the border of Bosnia and Herzegovina, and the genocide of between 428 and 550 Serb civilians by the 7th SS Volunteer Mountain Division Prinz Eugen and 21st Waffen Mountain Division of the SS Skanderbeg on 28 July 1944 in the settlement of Velika, in Plav, Montenegro during World War II.

==== Bosnian Muslims and Croats ====
The mass-killings which were committed against non-Serbs by members of the Chetniks, a Yugoslav Royalist and Serbian nationalist movement and guerrilla force, in Bosnia and Herzegovina, Croatia and Sandžak constituted a genocide, according to some historians. This can be seen through the mass-killings of ethnic Croats and Muslims that conformed to the Moljević plan ("On Our State and Its Borders") and the 1941 'Instructions' which were issued by the Chetnik leader, Draža Mihailović, concerning the cleansing of non-Serbs on the basis of creating a post-war Greater Serbia. The number of victims by ethnicity includes between 18,000 and 32,000 Croats and 29,000 to 33,000 Bosnian Muslims.

==== Disabled and mentally ill ====
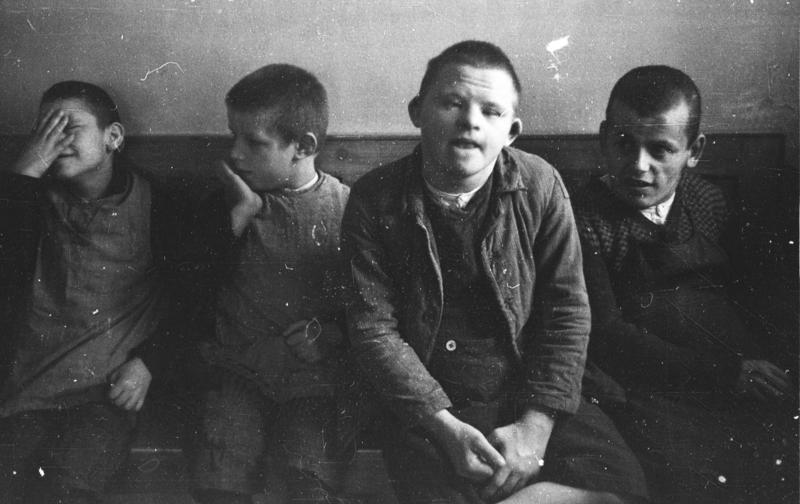
Schönbrunn Psychiatric Hospital, 1934 (Photo by SS photographer Friedrich Franz Bauer)

Our starting-point is not the individual, and we do not subscribe to the view that one should feed the hungry, give drink to the thirsty or clothe the naked—those are not our objectives. Our objectives are entirely different. They can be put most crisply in the sentence: we must have a healthy people in order to prevail in the world.

— Joseph Goebbels, 1938.

Between 1939 and 1941, 80,000 to 100,000 mentally ill adults in institutions were murdered; 5,000 children in institutions; and 1,000 Jews in institutions. Outside the mental health institutions, the figures are estimated to number 20,000 (according to Dr. Georg Renno, the deputy director of Schloss Hartheim, one of the killing facilities known as "euthanasia" centers) or 400,000 (according to Franz Ziereis, the commandant of Mauthausen-Gusen concentration camp). Another 300,000 were forcibly sterilised. Overall it has been estimated that over 270,000 individuals with mental disorders of all kinds were murdered, although their mass murder has received relatively little historical attention. Along with the physically disabled, people suffering from dwarfism were persecuted as well. Many were put on display in cages and experimented on by the Nazis. Despite not being formally ordered to take part, psychiatrists and psychiatric institutions were at the center of justifying, planning and carrying out the atrocities at every stage, and "constituted the connection" to the later annihilation of Jews and other "undesirables" in the Holocaust. After strong protests by the German Catholic and Protestant churches on 24 August 1941 Hitler ordered the cancellation of the T4 program.

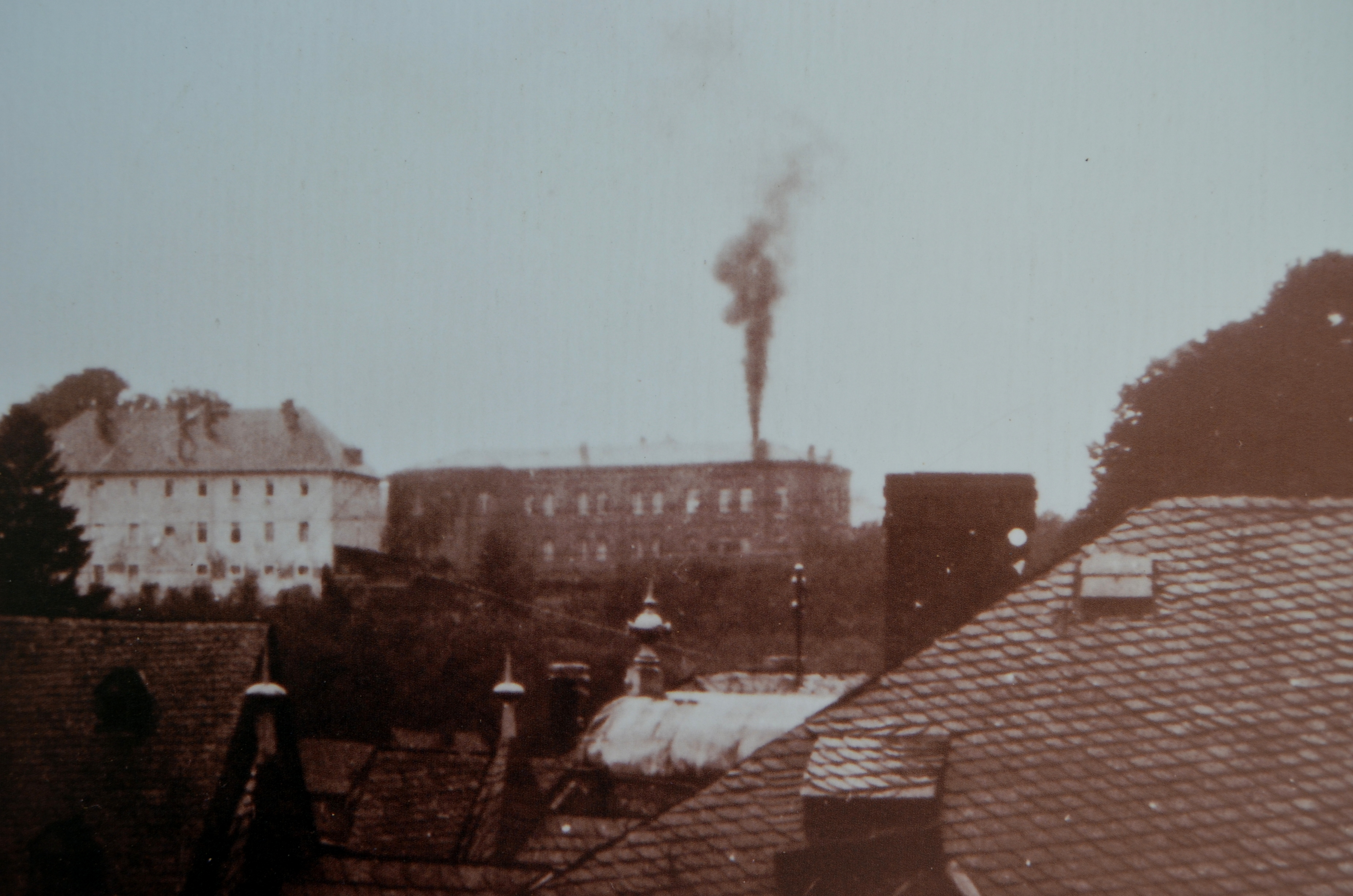
Crematorium chimney at Hadamar hospital

The program was named after Tiergartenstraße 4, the address of a villa in the Berlin borough of Tiergarten, the headquarters of the General Foundation for Welfare and Institutional Care, led by Philipp Bouhler, head of Hitler's private chancellery (Kanzlei des Führer der NSDAP) and Karl Brandt, Hitler's personal physician.

Brandt was tried in December 1946 at Nuremberg, along with 22 others, in a case which is known as United States of America vs. Karl Brandt et al., it is also known as the Doctors' Trial. He was hanged at Landsberg Prison on 2 June 1948.

== See also ==
- Accusation in a mirror
- Anti-communist mass killings
- Anti-Mongolianism
- Black genocide in the United States – the notion that African Americans have been subjected to genocide throughout their history because of racism against African Americans, an aspect of racism in the United States
- Crimes against humanity
- Criticism of communist party rule
- Democide
- Ethnic cleansing
- Ethnic conflict
- Ethnic violence
- Ethnocentrism
- Ethnocide
- Far-left politics
- Far-right politics
- Far-right subcultures
- Genocide denial
- Genocide recognition politics
- Genocide of Christians by the Islamic State
- Genocide of indigenous peoples
- Genocide of Yazidis by the Islamic State
- Hate crime
- Hate group
- Hate media
- Hate speech
- Hate studies
- Iraqi Turkmen genocide
- List of ethnic cleansing campaigns
- List of genocides
- Mass killings under communist regimes
- Mass racial violence in the United States
- Native American genocide in the United States — the notion that Native Americans have been subjected to genocide because of racism against them, another aspect of racism in the United States
- Nativism (politics)
- Persecution of Shias by the Islamic State
- Political cleansing of population – an aspect of political violence
- Population transfer
- Racism
- Religious intolerance
- Religious discrimination
- Religious persecution
- Religious violence
- Sectarian violence
- Supremacism
- Terrorism
- War crime
- Xenophobia

== Sources ==
- Ahmida, Ali Abdullatif (2023). "Eurocentrism, Silence and Memory of Genocide in Colonial Libya, 1929–1934". In Kiernan, Ben; Lower, Wendy; Naimark, Norman; Straus, Scott (eds.). The Cambridge World History of Genocide. Vol. III: Genocide in the Contemporary Era, 1914–2020. Cambridge University Press. pp. 118–140. doi:10.1017/9781108767118. ISBN 978-1-108-48707-8.
- Akçam, Taner (21 August 2007). A Shameful Act: The Armenian Genocide and the Question of Turkish Responsibility. Macmillan. ISBN 978-0-8050-8665-2.
- ——— (2012). The Young Turks' Crime Against Humanity: The Armenian Genocide and Ethnic Cleansing in the Ottoman Empire. Princeton: Princeton University Press.
- Allworth, Edward (1998). The Tatars of Crimea: Return to the Homeland: Studies and Documents. Durham: Duke University Press. ISBN 978-0-8223-1994-8. LCCN 97019110. OCLC 610947243.
- Aly, Götz; Chroust, Peter; Pross, Christian, eds. (1994). Cleansing the Fatherland: Nazi Medicine and Racial Hygiene. Baltimore: Johns Hopkins University Press.
- Andreopoulos, George J. (1997). Genocide: Conceptual and Historical Dimensions. University of Pennsylvania Press. ISBN 978-0-8122-1616-5.
- Andriewsky, Olga (23 January 2015). "Towards a Decentred History: The Study of the Holodomor and Ukrainian Historiography". East/West: Journal of Ukrainian Studies. 2 (1): 18–52. doi:10.21226/T2301N. ISSN 2292-7956. Archived from the original on 8 June 2018.
- Antonijević, Nenad (2009). "Albanski Zlocini nad Srbima na Kosovu i Metohiji u Drugom Svetskom Ratu" [Albanian Crimes against Serbs in Kosovo and Metohija in World War II] (PDF) (in Serbian). Muzej žrtava genocida.
- Aprim, Frederick A. (January 2005). Assyrians: the continuous saga. F. A. Aprim. ISBN 978-1-4134-3857-4.
- Asenap, Jason (6 November 2023). "Killers of the Flower Moon and who gets to tell an Osage story". Vox. Archived from the original on 6 March 2024.
- Balakian, Peter (2003). The Burning Tigris: The Armenian Genocide and America's Response. New York: HarperCollins. ISBN 978-0060558703.
- Bancheli, Tozun; Bartmann, Barry; Srebrnik, Henry (2004). De Facto States: The Quest for Sovereignty. Routledge. ISBN 978-1-135-77120-1.
- Barker, A. J. (1971). Rape of Ethiopia, 1936. New York: Ballantine Books. ISBN 978-0-345-02462-6.
- Bartulin, Nevenko (2013). The Racial Idea in the Independent State of Croatia: Origins and Theory. BRILL. ISBN 978-90-04-26282-9.
- Bauer, Yehuda (2001). Rethinking the Holocaust. New Haven: Yale University Press.
- Bell, Betty Louise (2005). "Indians with Voices: Revisiting Savagism and Civilization". In Blazek, William; Glenday, Michael K. (eds.). American Mythologies: New Essays on Contemporary Literature (DGO - Digital original ed.). Liverpool University Press. pp. 15–28. doi:10.2307/j.ctt5vjbd1.5. ISBN 978-0-85323-736-5. JSTOR j.ctt5vjbd1.5.
- Bentrovato, Denise; Bentrovato, Silvia (26 February 2024). "From a "Glorious Reparation" to a "Wretched Adventure": The Second Italo-Ethiopian War in Italian History Textbooks (1936-2020)". Journal of Genocide Research. 27 (1): 49–70. doi:10.1080/14623528.2024.2319920. hdl:2263/102204.
- Benz, Wolfgang (1999). The Holocaust: A German Historian Examines the Genocide. New York: Columbia University Press. ISBN 978-0-231-11214-7.
- Berenbaum, Michael; Kramer, Arnold; United States Holocaust Memorial Museum (2005). The world must know: the history of the Holocaust as told in the United States Holocaust Memorial Museum. United States Holocaust Memorial Museum, Johns Hopkins University Press. ISBN 978-0-8018-8358-3.
- Besikçi, İsmail (1990). Tunceli Kanunu (1935) ve Dersim Jenosidi [Tunceli Law (1935) and Dersim Genocide] (in Turkish). Belge Yayınları.
- Betts, Paul (17 August 2010). Years of Persecution, Years of Extermination: Saul Friedlander and the Future of Holocaust Studies. Continuum. ISBN 978-1-4411-2987-1.
- Beverly, John (1982). "El Salvador". Social Text (5). Duke University Press: 55–72. doi:10.2307/466334. JSTOR 466334.
- Bix, Herbert P. (2000). Hirohito and the making of modern Japan (1st ed.). New York, NY: HarperCollins. ISBN 0-06-019314-X. OCLC 43031388.
- Blackburn, Kevin (2000). "The Collective Memory of the Sook Ching Massacre and the Creation of the Civilian War Memorial of Singapore". Journal of the Malaysian Branch of the Royal Asiatic Society. 2 (279): 71–90. JSTOR 41493428.
- Blank, Stephen (2015). "A Double Dispossession: The Crimean Tatars After Russia's Ukrainian War". Genocide Studies and Prevention. 9 (1): 18–32. doi:10.5038/1911-9933.9.1.1271.
- Bloxham, Donald (2005). The Great Game of Genocide: Imperialism, Nationalism, and the Destruction of the Ottoman Armenians. Oxford: Oxford University Press. ISBN 978-0199226887.
- Bosch, Brian J. (1999). The Salvadoran Officer Corps and the Final Offensive of 1981. Jefferson, North Carolina; London: McFarland & Company. ISBN 0786406127.
- Bryant, Michael (7 May 2020). "Canaries in the Mineshaft of American Democracy: North American Settler Genocide in the Thought of Raphaël Lemkin". Genocide Studies and Prevention. 14 (1): 21–39. doi:10.5038/1911-9933.14.1.1632. ISSN 1911-0359.
- Budryte, Dovile (2005). Taming Nationalism? Political Community Building in the Post-Soviet Baltic States. Ashgate Publishing. ISBN 978-0-7546-4281-7.
- Bugai, Nikolai Fedorovich (Fall 1991). "The Truth About the Deportation of the Chechen and Ingush Peoples". Soviet Studies in History. 30 (2): 66–82. doi:10.2753/RSH1061-1983300266. ISSN 0038-5867.
- Bulag, Uradyn Erden (2002). Dilemmas The Mongols at China's edge: history and the politics of national unity. Rowman & Littlefield. ISBN 978-0-7425-1144-6.
- Burds, Jeffrey (2007). "The Soviet War against 'Fifth Columnists': The Case of Chechnya, 1942–4". Journal of Contemporary History. 42 (2): 267–314. doi:10.1177/0022009407075545. S2CID 159523593.
- Burleigh, Michael; Wippermann, Wolfgang (1991). The Racial State: Germany 1933–1945. Cambridge and New York: Cambridge University Press. ISBN 978-0-521-39802-2.
- Campbell, Bradley (June 2009). "Genocide as social control". Sociological Theory. 27 (2): 150–172. doi:10.1111/j.1467-9558.2009.01341.x. JSTOR 40376129. S2CID 143902886.
- Cepeda, Cody (8 December 2018). "Remembering the Filipino comfort women". INQUIRER.net. Archived from the original on 8 July 2024.
- Chakma, Kabita; Hill, Glen (2013). "Indigenous Women and Culture in the Colonized Chittagong Hills Tracts of Bangladesh". In Visweswaran, Kamala (ed.). Everyday Occupations: Experiencing Militarism in South Asia and the Middle East. University of Pennsylvania Press. pp. 132–157. ISBN 978-0-8122-4487-8.
- Chalk, Frank; Jonassohn, Kurt (1990). The History and Sociology of Genocide: Analyses and Case Studies. Yale University Press. ISBN 978-0-300-04446-1.
- Charny, Israel (1999). Encyclopedia of Genocide: A-H. ABC-CLIO. ISBN 978-0-87436-928-1.
- Clarke, Michael Edmund (2004). In the Eye of Power: China and Xinjiang from the Qing Conquest to the 'New Great Game' for Central Asia, 1759–2004 (PDF) (Thesis). Griffith University, Brisbane: Dept. of International Business & Asian Studies. Archived from the original (PDF) on 10 April 2008.
- Cooper, Tom; Grandolini, Albert (19 January 2015). Libyan Air Wars: Part 1: 1973-1985. Helion and Company. ISBN 978-1-910777-51-0 – via Google Books.
- Cardoza, Anthony L. (2006). Benito Mussolini: The First Fascist. Pearson Longman. ISBN 978-0321365804.
- Coyne, Delaney (26 October 2023). "How the Osage Nation became Catholic: The hard truths in 'Killers of the Flower Moon'". America. Archived from the original on 10 March 2024.
- Crowe, David M. (2013). "War Crimes and Genocide in History". In Crowe, David M. (ed.). Crimes of State Past and Present: Government-Sponsored Atrocities and International Legal Responses. London; New York: Routledge. ISBN 978-1-317-98681-2.
- Cuéllar Martínez, Benjamín (2004). "El Salvador: De Genocidio en Genocidio" [El Salvador: From Genocide to Genocide]. Estudios Centroamericanos (in Spanish). 59 (672). San Salvador, El Salvador: Central American University: 1083–1088. doi:10.51378/eca.v59i672.5170.
- Dadrian, Vahakn N. (1995). The History of the Armenian Genocide: Ethnic Conflict from the Balkans to Anatolia to the Caucasus. Oxford: Berghahn Books.
- Davies, Norman (2001) [1984]. Heart of Europe: The past in Poland's present. Oxford University Press.
- Davies, Robert W.; Wheatcroft, Stephen G. (2009). The Industrialisation of Soviet Russia. Vol. 5: The Years of Hunger: Soviet Agriculture 1931–1933. Palgrave Macmillan. doi:10.1057/9780230273979. ISBN 978-0-230-23855-8.
- Dawidowicz, Lucy (1986). The War Against the Jews. Bantam Books.
- DeKelaita, Robert (22 November 2009). The Origins and Developments of Assyrian Nationalism (PDF) (MA). Committee on International Relations of the University of Chicago. Archived from the original (PDF) on 18 July 2024 – via Assyrian International News Agency.
- de Diego García, Emilio (1993). "El drama yugoslavo: ¿Europa entre los siglos XIX y XXI?" [The Yugoslav drama: Europe between the 19th and 21st centuries?] (PDF). Cuadernos de Historia Moderna y Contemporánea (in Spanish). 15. Universidad Complutense de Madrid: 171–188. ISSN 0214-400X.
- Donabed, Sargon (1 February 2015). Reforging a Forgotten History: Iraq and the Assyrians in the 20th Century. Edinburgh University Press. ISBN 978-0-7486-8605-6.
- Dongxun, Sha (1995). "Nán shí yuānhún——qīn huá rìjūn zài yuè mìmì jìnxíng xìjùn zhàn de zuìxíng" 南石冤魂——侵华日军在粤秘密进行细菌战的罪行 [The Wounded Soul of Nanshi - The crime of the Japanese invaders secretly conducting germ warfare in Guangdong]. 广东党史 (in Chinese) (3): 25–30.
- Duggan, Christopher (2007). The Force of Destiny: A History of Italy Since 1796. New York: Houghton Mifflin.
- Dulić, Tomislav (2006). "Mass killing in the Independent State of Croatia, 1941–1945: a case for comparative research". Journal of Genocide Research. 8: 255–281. doi:10.1111/nana.12433. S2CID 242057219.
- Dunlop, John B. (28 September 1998). Russia Confronts Chechnya: Roots of a Separatist Conflict. Cambridge University Press. ISBN 978-0-521-63184-6.
- Earl Porter, Thomas (20 November 2018). "Hitler's Rassenkampf in the East: The Forgotten Genocide of Soviet POWs". Nationalities Papers. 37 (6): 839–859. doi:10.1080/00905990903230785. S2CID 162190846. Archived from the original on 9 September 2023.
- Edelheit, Abraham J.; Edelheit, Hershel; Edelheit, Ann (1995). History of the Holocaust: a Handbook and a Dictionary. Routledge. ISBN 978-0813322407.
- Ediev, Dalkhat (2003). Demograficheskie poteri deportirovannykh narodov SSSR Демографические потери депортированных народов СССР [Demographic losses of the deported peoples of the USSR] (in Russian). Stavropol.
- Eichholtz, Dietrich [in German] (September 2004). ""Generalplan Ost" zur Versklavung osteuropäischer Völker" ["Generalplan Ost" on the enslavement of Eastern European peoples] (PDF). UTOPIE Kreativ (in German) (167): 800–808. Archived from the original (PDF) on 24 June 2008.
- Ellman, Michael (June 2007). "Stalin and the Soviet famine of 1932–33 Revisited" (PDF). Europe-Asia Studies. 59 (4): 663–693. doi:10.1080/09668130701291899. S2CID 53655536. Archived from the original (PDF) on 23 January 2016.
- Epton, Nina Consuelo (1953). Oasis Kingdom: The Libyan Story. New York: Roy Publishers.
- Evdokimov, Rostislav, ed. (1995). Lyudskiye poteri SSSR v period vtoroy mirovoy voyny: sbornik statey Людские потери СССР в период второй мировой войны: сборник статей [Human Losses of the USSR during the Second World War: a collection of articles] (in Russian). Saint-Petersburg: Ин-т российской истории РАН (Russian Academy of Sciences). ISBN 978-5-86789-023-0.
- Fairbank, J. K.; Goldman, M. (2006). China: A New History (2nd ed.). Harvard University Press. ISBN 9780674018280.
- Fawkes, Helen (24 November 2006). "Legacy of famine divides Ukraine". BBC News. Archived from the original on 1 October 2023.
- Felton, Mark (2015). "The Perfect Storm: Japanese military brutality during World War Two". The Routledge History of Genocide. Routledge. doi:10.4324/9781315719054-10 (inactive 8 July 2025). ISBN 978-1315719054.
- Figes, Orlando (1997). A People's Tragedy: The Russian Revolution, 1891–1924. Pimlico. ISBN 978-0-7126-7327-3.
- Filar, Władysław (2008). Wydarzenia wołyńskie 1939–1944 [Volhynian events 1939–1944] (in Polish). Toruń: Wydawnictwo Adam Marszałek. ISBN 978-83-7441-884-3.
- Finberg, Leonid; Lyubchenko, Volodymyr, eds. (2008). Narysy z istoriyi ta kul'tury yevreyiv Ukrayiny Нариси з історії та культури євреїв України [Essays on the history and culture of the Jews of Ukraine] (in Ukrainian). Kyiv: Dukh i litera.
- Fisher, Alan W. (2014). Crimean Tatars. Stanford, California: Hoover Press. ISBN 978-0-8179-6663-8. LCCN 76041085. OCLC 946788279.
- Fixico, Donald L. (2012). The Invasion of Indian Country in the Twentieth Century: American Capitalism and Tribal Natural Resources (Second ed.). University Press of Colorado. ISBN 978-1-4571-1166-2. JSTOR j.ctt46nvt7.
- Gammer, M. (2006). The Lone Wolf and the Bear: Three Centuries of Chechen Defiance of Russian Rule. C. Hurst & Co. Publishers. ISBN 978-1-85065-748-4.
- Gangopadhyay, Partha (2016). "Economic Foundations of Religious Killings and Genocide with Special Reference to Pakistan, 1978–2012". In Anderton, Charles H.; Brauer, Jurgen (eds.). Economic Aspects of Genocides, Other Mass Atrocities, and Their Prevention. Oxford University Press. pp. 510–535. ISBN 978-0-19-937829-6.
- Gaunt, David (2006). Massacres, Resistance, Protectors: Muslim-Christian Relations in Eastern Anatolia during World War I. Piscataway, NJ: Gorgias Press. ISBN 978-1-59333-301-0.
- ——— (2017). Let Them Not Return: Sayfo - The Genocide Against the Assyrian, Syriac, and Chaldean Christians in the Ottoman Empire. Berghahn Books. ISBN 978-1-78533-499-3.
- Gibney, Matthew J.; Hansen, Randall, eds. (2005). Immigration and Asylum: From 1900 to the Present. ABC-CLIO. ISBN 978-1-57607-796-2.
- Geiger, Vladimir [in Croatian] (2012). "Human Losses of the Croats in World War II and the Immediate Post-War Period Caused by the Chetniks (Yugoslav Army in the Fatherland) and the Partisans (People's Liberation Army and the Partisan Detachments of Yugoslavia/Yugoslav Army) and the Communist Authorities: Numerical Indicators". Revue für Kroatische Geschichte = Revue d'Histoire Croate. VIII (1). Croatian Institute of History: 85–88.
- Gellately, Robert; Kiernan, Ben (2003). The Specter of Genocide: Mass Murder in Historical Perspective. Cambridge: Cambridge University Press. ISBN 978-0-521-52750-7.
- Gellately, Robert (2007). Lenin, Stalin, and Hitler: The Age of Social Catastrophe. Knopf. ISBN 978-1-4000-4005-6. Archived from the original on 5 May 2016.
- Geller, Mikhail; Nekrich, Aleksandr (January 1988). Utopia in power: the history of the Soviet Union from 1917 to the present. Summit Books. ISBN 978-0-671-64535-9.
- Gerlach, Christian (2010). Extremely Violent Societies: Mass Violence in the Twentieth-Century World. Cambridge University Press. p. 6. ISBN 978-1-139-49351-2 – via Google Books.
- Getty, J. Arch (1 March 2000). "The Future Did Not Work". The Atlantic.
- Gilbert, Martin (2002). The Routledge Atlas of the Holocaust. London & New York: Routledge. ISBN 978-0-415-28145-4.
- Glenny, Misha (2000). The Balkans: Nationalism, War and the Great Powers, 1804–1999. New York: Viking Press. ISBN 978-0-670-85338-0.
- Goldman, Wendy Z. (2011). Inventing the Enemy: Denunciation and Terror in Stalin's Russia. New York: Cambridge University Press. doi:10.1017/CBO9780511994906. ISBN 978-0511994906.
- Goodman, David S. G. (2004). China's campaign to "Open up the West": national, provincial, and local perspectives. Cambridge University Press. ISBN 978-0-521-61349-1.
- Gosh, Palash R. (15 October 2012). "Parsley Massacre: The Genocide That Still Haunts Haiti-Dominican Relations". International Business Times. Archived from the original on 22 October 2023.
- Grasso, June; Corrin, Jay; Kort, Michael (2024). Modernization And Revolution In China: From the Opium Wars to World Power. Routledge. ISBN 978-1032124896.
- Griffin, Nicholas (2004). Caucasus: A Journey to the Land Between Christianity and Islam. Chicago: University of Chicago Press. ISBN 978-0-226-30859-3. LCCN 2003063352.
- Griffin, Roger (2012). Terrorist's Creed: Fanatical Violence and the Human Need for Meaning. Palgrave Macmillan. ISBN 978-0-230-24129-9. LCCN 2012289543.
- Hamilton, Charles (1984). Leaders & Personalities of the Third Reich. Vol. 1. R. James Bender Publishing. ISBN 0-912138-27-0.
- Hancock, Ian (2004). "Romanies and the Holocaust: A Reevaluation and an Overview". In Stone, Dan (ed.). The Historiography of the Holocaust. New York: Palgrave-Macmillan. pp. 383–396. Archived from the original on 10 July 2004.
- Hancock, Ian (6 March 2019). "Jewish Responses to the Porajmos (The Romani Holocaust)". In Rosenbaum, Alan S. (ed.). Is The Holocaust Unique? Perspectives On Comparative Genocide. Routledge. ISBN 978-0-429-71117-6.
- Headland, Ronald (1992). Messages of Murder: A Study of the Reports of the Einsatzgruppen of the Security Police and the Security Service, 1941–1943. Fairleigh Dickinson University Press. ISBN 978-0-8386-3418-9.
- Hechter, Michael (12 May 2021). "Internal Colonialism, Alien Rule, and Famine in Ireland and Ukraine". East/West: Journal of Ukrainian Studies. 8 (1): 145–157. doi:10.21226/ewjus642.
- Hilberg, Raul (2003) [1961]. The Destruction of the European Jews. Vol. I–III (3rd ed.). New Haven and London: Yale University Press. ISBN 0-300-09592-9.
- Hollander, Paul (1 July 2012). "Perspectives on Norman Naimark's Stalin's Genocides". Journal of Cold War Studies. 14 (3): 149–189. doi:10.1162/JCWS_a_00250. S2CID 57560838.
- Holquist, Peter (1994). A Russian Vendee: The Practice of Revolutionary Politics in the Don Countryside, 1917–1921 (Ph.D.). Columbia University.
- ——— (1997). ""Conduct merciless mass terror": decossackization on the Don, 1919". Cahiers du Monde Russe. 38: 127–162. doi:10.3406/cmr.1997.2486. Archived from the original on 4 December 2009.
- Hrynevych, Liudmyla [in Ukrainian] (12 May 2021). "Stalin's Faminogenic Policies in Ukraine: The Imperial Discourse". East/West: Journal of Ukrainian Studies. 8 (1): 99–143. doi:10.21226/ewjus641.
- Hui, Fu Li (1961). China reconstructs. Vol. 10. China Welfare Institute.
- Huonker, Thomas; Ludi, Regula (2001). Roma, Sinti und Jenische. Schweizerische Zigeunerpolitik zur Zeit des Nationalsozialismus. Beitrag zur Forschung [Roma, Sinti and Yenish. Swiss Gypsy policy during the National Socialist era. Contribution to research] (PDF). Veröffentlichungen der UEK (Report) (in German). Vol. 23. UEK, Swiss Government.
- "Resolution by the International Association of Genocide Scholars" (PDF). IAGS. December 2007. Archived from the original (PDF) on 19 February 2025.
- Irvin-Erickson, Douglas (12 May 2021). "Raphaël Lemkin, Genocide, Colonialism, Famine, and Ukraine". East/West: Journal of Ukrainian Studies. 8 (1): 193–215. doi:10.21226/ewjus645.
- Jaimoukha, Amjad (2004). The Chechens: A Handbook. Taylor & Francis. ISBN 978-0-203-35643-2.
- Jones, Adam (2006). Genocide: A Comprehensive Introduction. Routledge. ISBN 978-0-415-35385-4. Excerpts Chapter 1: Genocide in prehistory, antiquity, and early modernity Archived 10 October 2017 at the Wayback Machine
- ——— (2010) [2006]. "The conquest of the Americas". Genocide: A Comprehensive Introduction (revised ed.). London: Routledge. ISBN 978-0-203-84696-4. OCLC 672333335.
- Kaisalmi, Ahti (2018). ""Neuvostoliitosta suuntautuvasta paluumuutosta ei tarvitse mitään etukäteisselvityksiä" – Inkeriläisten paluumuuton käynnistymisen motiivit ja toteutus ulkoasiainministeriössä vuosina 1990–1991" ["Returns from the Soviet Union do not require any prior clarifications" - Motives and implementation of the return migration of Ingrians in the Ministry of Foreign Affairs in 1990–1991] (PDF). Pro Gradu, Department of Philosophy, Contemporary History and Political Science. University of Turku. Archived (PDF) from the original on 25 February 2022.
- Kajosevic, Samir (28 July 2021). "'Genocide' Controversy Erupts over WWII Massacres in Montenegro". Balkan Insight. Archived from the original on 14 June 2023.
- Kakar, Mohammed Hassan (1995). Afghanistan: The Soviet Invasion and the Afghan Response, 1979–1982. University of California Press. ISBN 978-0-5209-1914-3 – via Google Books.
- Karski, Karol (2013). "The Crime of Genocide Committed against the Poles by the USSR before and during World War II: An International Legal Study". Case Western Reserve Journal of International Law. 45.
- Kiernan, Ben (2007). Blood and Soil: A World History of Genocide and Extermination from Sparta to Darfur. New Haven, CT: Yale University Press. ISBN 978-0-300-10098-3.
- Kieser, Hans-Lukas; Schaller, Dominik J. (2002). Der Völkermord an den Armeniern und die Shoah [The Armenian Genocide and the Shoah] (in German). Chronos. ISBN 978-3-0340-0561-6.
- Kindler, Robert (21 August 2018). Stalin's Nomads: Power and Famine in Kazakhstan. University of Pittsburgh Press. ISBN 978-0-8229-6543-5.
- Klid, Bohdan (12 May 2021). "Empire-Building, Imperial Policies, and Famine in Occupied Territories and Colonies". East/West: Journal of Ukrainian Studies. 8 (1): 11–32. doi:10.21226/ewjus634.
- Kohl, Philip L.; Kozelsky, Mara; Ben-Yehuda, Nachman (2008). Selective Remembrances: Archaeology in the Construction, Commemoration, and Consecration of National Pasts. University of Chicago Press. ISBN 978-0-226-45064-3.
- Kulchytsky, Stanislav [in Ukrainian] (17 February 2007). "Holodomor 1932–1933 rr. yak henotsyd: prohalyny u dokazovii bazi" Голодомор 1932 — 1933 рр. як геноцид: прогалини у доказовій базі [Holodomor 1932–1933 as genocide: gaps in the evidence]. Den (in Ukrainian). Archived from the original on 1 November 2020.
- Labanca, Nicola (2004). "Colonial rule, colonial repression and war crimes in the Italian colonies". Journal of Modern Italian Studies. 9 (3): 300–313. doi:10.1080/1354571042000254737. S2CID 144498755.
- Lang, Berel (2005). "The Evil in Genocide". Genocide and Human Rights: A Philosophical Guide. Palgrave Macmillan UK. pp. 5–17. doi:10.1057/9780230554832_1. ISBN 978-0-230-55483-2.
- Lee, Geok Boi (2005). The Syonan Years: Singapore Under Japanese Rule, 1942-1945. Singapore: National Archives of Singapore. ISBN 9810542909.
- Legters, Lyman H. (1992). "The American Genocide". In Lyden, Fremont J. (ed.). Native Americans and Public Policy. Pittsburgh: University of Pittsburgh Press. ISBN 978-0-8229-7682-0. OCLC 555693841.
- Lerner, Natan (1994). "Ethnic Cleansing". In Dinstein, Yoram (ed.). Israel Yearbook on Human Rights. Vol. 24. Martinus Nijhoff Publishers. ISBN 978-90-411-0026-9. ISSN 0333-5925.
- Levene, Mark (2005). Genocide in the Age of the Nation State. Vol. 2: The Rise of the West and Coming Genocide. I. B. Tauris. ISBN 978-1-84511-057-4.
- ——— (2008). "Empires, Native Peoples, and Genocides". In Moses, A. Dirk (ed.). Empire, Colony, Genocide: Conquest, Occupation, and Subaltern Resistance in World History. Oxford and New York: Berghahn Books. pp. 183–204. ISBN 978-1-84545-452-4.
- ——— (2013). Annihilation. Vol. II: The European Rimlands 1939–1953. Oxford University Press. ISBN 978-0-19-968304-8.
- Levy, Michele Frucht (2009). ""The Last Bullet for the Last Serb": The Ustaša Genocide against Serbs: 1941–1945". Nationalities Papers. 37 (6): 807–837. doi:10.1080/00905990903239174. S2CID 162231741.
- Lifton, Robert J. (2000) [1986]. The Nazi Doctors: Medical Killing and the Psychology of Genocide (2000 ed.). New York: Basic Books. ISBN 978-0-465-04905-9.
- Lu, Suping (6 December 2019). The 1937 – 1938 Nanjing Atrocities. Springer. ISBN 978-981-13-9656-4.
- Łuczak, Czesław (1994). "Szanse i trudności bilansu demograficznego Polski w latach 1939–1945" [Opportunities and difficulties of the demographic balance of Poland in the years 1939–1945]. Dzieje Najnowsze (in Polish) (2).
- Maisel, Sebastian (30 June 2018). The Kurds: An Encyclopedia of Life, Culture, and Society. ABC-CLIO. ISBN 978-1-4408-4257-3.
- Mälksoo, Lauri (2001). "Soviet Genocide? Communist Mass Deportations in the Baltic States and International Law". Leiden Journal of International Law. 14 (4). Cambridge University Press: 757–787. doi:10.1017/S0922156501000371.
- Mann, Michael (2006). The Dark Side of Democracy: Explaining Ethnic Cleansing. Cambridge University Press. ISBN 978-0-521-53854-1 – via Google Books.
- Margolin, Jean-Louis (2006). "Japanese Crimes in Nanjing, 1937-38: A Reappraisal". China Perspectives. 2006: 1–16. doi:10.4000/chinaperspectives.571.
- Markevich, Andrei; Naumenko, Natalya; Qian, Nancy (July 2021). "The Political-Economic Causes of the Soviet Great Famine, 1932–33". National Bureau of Economic Research Working Papers. Cambridge, MA. doi:10.3386/w29089. SSRN 3928687. CEPR Discussion Paper No. DP16408.
- Marples, David R. (30 November 2005). "The great famine debate goes on..." Edmont Journal. University of Alberta. Archived from the original on 15 June 2008 – via ExpressNews.
- Mawdsley, Evan (1998). The Stalin Years: The Soviet Union, 1929–1953. Manchester University Press. ISBN 978-0-7190-4600-1. LCCN 2003046365.
- Mayaram, Shail (2009). The other global city. US: Taylor & Francis. ISBN 978-0-415-99194-0.
- McCarthy, Justin (1995), Death and Exile: The Ethnic Cleansing of Ottoman Muslims, 1821–1922, Darwin
- McDowall, David (14 May 2004). A Modern History of the Kurds (Third ed.). Bloomsbury Academic. ISBN 978-1-85043-416-0.
- Midlarsky, Manus I. (2005). The Killing Trap: Genocide in the Twentieth Century. Cambridge University Press. doi:10.1017/CBO9780511491023. ISBN 978-0521894692.
- Miller, Michael (2006). Leaders of the SS and German Police. Vol. 1. San Jose, CA: R. James Bender. ISBN 978-93-297-0037-2.
- Mockler, Anthony (2003). Haile Selassie's War. New York: Olive Branch Press. ISBN 978-1-56656-473-1.
- Monroe, Kristen R. (2011). Ethics in an Age of Terror and Genocide: Identity and Moral Choice. Princeton University Press. ISBN 978-0-691-15143-4.
- Montefiore, Simon Sebag (3 June 2010). Stalin: The Court of the Red Tsar. Orion. ISBN 978-0-297-86385-4.
- Morgenthau, Henry (1918). Ambassador Morgenthau's Story. Garden City, NY: Doubleday.
- Morrison, Alexander (2020). The Russian Conquest of Central Asia: A Study in Imperial Expansion, 1814–1914. Cambridge University Press. ISBN 978-1107030305.
- Morska, Izabela (8 December 2022). "Animality as an excuse for murder: David Grann and Killers of the Flower Moon". Beyond Philology (19/4): 97–127. doi:10.26881/bp.2022.4.04. ISSN 2451-1498.
- Motyka, Grzegorz (2011). Od rzezi wołyńskiej do akcji "Wisła". Konflikt polsko-ukraiński 1943–1947 [From the Volhynian Massacre to Operation Vistula. The Polish-Ukrainian Conflict 1943–1947.] (in Polish). Kraków.
- Mulaj, Klejda (2008). Politics of ethnic cleansing: nation-state building and provision of in/security in twentieth-century balkans. Lexington Books. ISBN 978-0-7391-1782-8.
- Naimark, Norman M. (2002). Fires of Hatred: Ethnic Cleansing in Twentieth-Century Europe. Harvard University Press. ISBN 0-674-00994-0.
- Naimark, Norman M. (2010). Stalin's Genocides. Princeton University Press. ISBN 978-0691152387.
- ——— (2016). Genocide: A World History. Oxford University Press. ISBN 978-0199765263.
- ——— (2023). "Genocide in Stalinist Russia and Ukraine, 1930–1938". In Kiernan, Ben; Lower, Wendy; Naimark, Norman; Straus, Scott (eds.). The Cambridge World History of Genocide. Vol. III: Genocide in the Contemporary Era, 1914–2020. Cambridge University Press. pp. 162–185. doi:10.1017/9781108767118. ISBN 978-1-108-48707-8.
- Naumenko, Natalya (March 2021). "The Political Economy of Famine: The Ukrainian Famine of 1933". The Journal of Economic History. 81 (1): 156–197. doi:10.1017/S0022050720000625. ISSN 0022-0507.
- Niewyk, Donald L.; Nicosia, Francis R. (2000). The Columbia Guide to the Holocaust. Columbia University Press. p. 45. ISBN 978-0-231-11200-0. "The Holocaust is commonly defined as the murder of more than 5,000,000 Jews by the Germans in World War II."
- Oberländer, Erwin (2011). "Soviet Genocide in Latvia? Conflicting Cultures of Remembrance of Stalin's Policy, 1940–1953". In Housden, Martyn; Smith, David James (eds.). Forgotten Pages in Baltic History: Diversity and Inclusion. Rodopi. pp. 239–262. ISBN 978-90-420-3315-3.
- Olusoga, David; Erichsen, Casper W. (2010). The Kaiser's Holocaust: Germany's Forgotten Genocide and the Colonial Roots of Nazism. London: Faber and Faber. ISBN 978-0-571-23141-6.
- Osadchenko, E. V.; Rudneva, S. E. (2012). "Golod na Kubani 1932-1933 Gg" Голод на Kубани 1932-1933 Гг. [Famine in Kuban 1932–1933]. Archived from the original on 6 October 2023.
- Osterlund, Paul Benjamin (1 May 2015). "Turkey's Alevis 'under the shadow of military tanks". Al Jazeera. Archived from the original on 20 August 2022.
- Paulson, Steve (17 February 2011). "A View of the Holocaust". BBC. Archived from the original on 17 October 2023.
- Pavlowitch, Stevan K. (2008). Hitler's New Disorder: The Second World War in Yugoslavia. New York: Columbia University Press. ISBN 978-0-231-70050-4.
- Payaslian, Simon (11 January 2021). "20th Century Genocides". International Relations. Oxford University Press. doi:10.1093/OBO/9780199743292-0105. ISBN 978-0-19-974329-2 – via Oxford Bibliographies Online.
- Payne, Matthew J. (2011). "Seeing like a soviet state: settlement of nomadic Kazakhs, 1928-1934". In Alexopoulos, Golfo; Hessler, Julie; Tomoff, Kiril (eds.). Writing the Stalin Era: Sheila Fitzpatrick and Soviet Historiography. Palgrave Macmillan. pp. 59–86. ISBN 978-0230105492.
- Payne, Stanley G. (2006). "The NDH State in Comparative Perspective". Totalitarian Movements and Political Religions. 7 (4): 409–415. doi:10.1080/14690760600963198. S2CID 144782263.
- Pednaud, J. Tithonus (2008). "The Ovitz Family – Nazi Experiments". Thehumanmarvels.com. Archived from the original on 16 January 2013.
- Perdue, Peter C. (2005). China Marches West: The Qing Conquest of Central Eurasia. Cambridge, MA; London: The Belknap Press of Harvard University Press. ISBN 978-0-674-01684-2.
- Perovic, Jeronim (June 2018). From Conquest to Deportation: The North Caucasus under Russian Rule. Oxford University Press. ISBN 978-0-19-093467-5. OCLC 1083957407.
- Phayer, Michael (2000). The Catholic Church and the Holocaust, 1930–1965. Bloomington and Indianapolis: Indiana University Press. ISBN 978-0-253-33725-2.
- Pianciola, Niccolò (2004). "Famine in the steppe. The collectivization of agriculture and the Kazak herdsmen, 1928-1934". Cahiers du monde russe. 45 (1–2): 137–192.
- Pianciola, Niccolò (2009). Stalinismo di frontiera. Colonizzazione agricola, sterminio dei nomadi and costruzione statale in Asia centrale (1905-1936) [Frontier Stalinism: Agricultural Colonization, Extermination of Nomads, and State-Building in Central Asia (1905-1936)] (in Italian). Rome: Viella. ISBN 978-8883343520.
- Pianciola, Niccolò (2021). "Environment, Empire, and the Great Famine in Stalin's Kazakhstan". Journal of Genocide Research. 23 (4): 588–592. doi:10.1080/14623528.2020.1807140.
- Piotrowski, Tadeusz (1998). Poland's holocaust. McFarland. ISBN 978-0-7864-0371-4.
- Piper, Franciszek (1998). "The Number of Victims". In Gutman, Yisrael; Berenbaum, Michael (eds.). Anatomy of the Auschwitz Death Camp. Indiana University Press. ISBN 978-0-253-20884-2.
- Pipes, Richard (1996). A Concise History of the Russian Revolution. Vintage Books. ISBN 978-0679745440.
- Pohl, J. Otto (1999). Ethnic cleansing in the USSR, 1937-1949. Westport, Conn.: Greenwood Press. ISBN 0-313-30921-3.
- ——— (1 June 2000). "Stalin's genocide against the 'Repressed Peoples'". Journal of Genocide Research. 2 (2): 267–293. doi:10.1080/713677598.
- Polian, Pavel (January 2004). Against Their Will: The History and Geography of Forced Migrations in the USSR. Central European University Press. ISBN 978-963-9241-68-8.
- Pushkareva, Irina (1984). "Shtyurmer, Boris Vladimirovich" Штюрмер, Борис Владимирович [Stürmer, Boris Vladimirovich]. Krugosvet (in Russian). Archived from the original on 11 November 2007.
- Ramet, Sabrina P. (2006). The Three Yugoslavias: State-Building and Legitimation, 1918–2005. New York: Indiana University Press. ISBN 978-0-253-34656-8.
- Rayfield, Donald (2004). Stalin and His Hangmen: The Tyrant and Those who Killed for Him. Random House. ISBN 978-0-375-50632-1.
- Redžić, Enver (2005). Bosnia and Herzegovina in the Second World War. New York: Taylor & Francis. ISBN 978-0-7146-5625-0.
- Rendel, G. W. (20 March 1922), Turkish Massacres and Persecutions of Minorities since the Armistice (memorandum), Foreign Office
- Reuter, Anni (2019). "Neuvostovaltaa vastaan – Inkerinsuomalaisten hiljaista vastarintaa 1930-luvulla" [Against Soviet power - the silent resistance of Ingrian Finns in the 1930s.] (PDF). In Autti, Outi; Lehtola, Veli-Pekka (eds.). Hiljainen vastarinta [Silent resistance] (in Finnish). Tampere University Press. pp. 131–162. ISBN 978-952-359-000-7. Archived (PDF) from the original on 27 October 2020.
- Rezvani, Babak (15 March 2014). Ethno-territorial conflict and coexistence in the caucasus, Central Asia and Fereydan: academisch proefschrift. Amsterdam University Press. ISBN 978-90-485-1928-6.
- Rhodes, Richard (2002). Masters of death: the SS-Einsatzgruppen and the invention of the Holocaust. New York: Alfred A. Knopf. ISBN 978-0-375-40900-4.
- Richter, James (May 2020). "Famine, Memory, and Politics in the Post-Soviet Space: Contrasting Echoes of Collectivization in Ukraine and Kazakhstan". Nationalities Papers. 48 (3): 476–491. doi:10.1017/nps.2019.17. ISSN 0090-5992. S2CID 212964880.
- Rigg, Bryan Mark (2024). Japan's Holocaust: History of Imperial Japan's Mass Murder and Rape During World War II. Knox Press. ISBN 9781637586884.
- Robins, Nicholas; Jones, Adam (2009). Genocides by the Oppressed. Indiana University Press. ISBN 978-0-253-22077-6.
- Roszkowski, Wojciech (2016). Biographical Dictionary of Central and Eastern Europe in the Twentieth Century. Routledge. ISBN 978-1-317-47593-4.
- Rubinstein, William D. (2004). Genocide: A History. Pearson Education. ISBN 978-0-582-50601-5.
- Rugira, Lonzen (20 April 2022). "Why Genocide is "the crime of crimes"". Pan African Review. Archived from the original on 13 June 2024.
- Rummel, Rudolph J. (1996). Lethal Politics: Soviet Genocides and Mass Murders Since 1917. Transaction Publishers. ISBN 978-1-4128-2750-8.
- ——— (1998). Statistics of Democide: Genocide and Mass Murder Since 1900. LIT Verlag Münster. ISBN 978-3-8258-4010-5.
- Sabol, Steven (2017). 'The Touch of Civilization': Comparing American and Russian Internal Colonization. University Press of Colorado. doi:10.2307/j.ctt1mtz7g6. ISBN 978-1-60732-550-5. JSTOR j.ctt1mtz7g6.
- Salamanca, Carlos (2008). "De las fosas al panteón: contrasentidos en las honras de los indios revividos" [From the graves to the pantheon: contradictions in the honors of the revived Indians] (PDF). Revista Colombiana de Antropología (in Spanish). 44: 7–39. doi:10.22380/2539472X.1041 – via core.ac.uk.
- Saymaz, Ismail (14 March 2011). "Turkish prosecutor refuses to hear Dersim 'genocide' claim". Hürriyet Daily News.
- Schabas, William A. (2000). Genocide in International Law: The Crimes of Crimes (PDF) (1st ed.). Cambridge University Press. ISBN 0-521-78262-7. Archived from the original (PDF) on 16 June 2024.
- ——— (2009). Genocide in International Law: The Crime of Crimes (2nd ed.). Cambridge: Cambridge University Press. ISBN 978-0-521-71900-1.
- Schaller, Dominik J.; Zimmerer, Jürgen (2008). "Late Ottoman genocides: the dissolution of the Ottoman Empire and Young Turkish population and extermination policies – introduction". Journal of Genocide Research. 10 (1): 7–14. doi:10.1080/14623520801950820. S2CID 71515470.
- Segal, Raz (2016). "Introduction". Genocide in the Carpathians: War, Social Breakdown, and Mass Violence, 1914–1945. Stanford, California: Stanford University Press. pp. 1–18. ISBN 978-0-8047-9897-6.
- Sereny, Gitta (1995), Albert Speer: His Battle with Truth, Knopf, ISBN 978-0-394-52915-8
- Snyder, Timothy (2002). "Memory and Power". In Müller, Jan-Werner (ed.). Poland, Lithuania and Ukraine. Cambridge University Press. ISBN 052100070X.
- ——— (2003). The Reconstruction of Nations. Poland, Ukraine, Lithuania, Belarus, 1569–1999. Yale University Press. ISBN 0-300-10586-X.
- ——— (2009). Rekonstrukcja narodów. Polska, Ukraina, Litwa, Białoruś 1569–1999 [Reconstruction of nations. Poland, Ukraine, Lithuania, Belarus 1569-1999] (in Polish). Sejny.
- ——— (24 February 2010). "A Fascist Hero in Democratic Kiev". The New York Review of Books. Archived from the original on 6 June 2016.
- ——— (5 October 2010). "The fatal fact of the Nazi-Soviet pact". The Guardian. Archived from the original on 6 August 2018.
- ——— (2010). Bloodlands: Europe between Hitler and Stalin. New York: Basic Books.
- Sokol, Edward Dennis (26 June 2016). The Revolt of 1916 in Russian Central Asia. Johns Hopkins University Press. ISBN 978-1-4214-2051-6.
- Sommer, Tomasz (2010). "Execute the Poles: The Genocide of Poles in the Soviet Union, 1937–1938. Documents from Headquarters". The Polish Review. 55 (4): 417–436. doi:10.2307/27920673. JSTOR 27920673. S2CID 151099905.
- Staub, Ervin (1989). The Roots of Evil: The Origins of Genocide and Other Group Violence. Cambridge, UK: Cambridge University Press. ISBN 978-0-521-42214-7.
- Stewart, C. C. (1986). "Islam" (PDF). The Cambridge History of Africa. Vol. 7: c. 1905 – c. 1940. Cambridge, United Kingdom: Cambridge University Press.
- Straus, Scott (2022). Graziosi, Andrea; Sysyn, Frank E. (eds.). Genocide: The Power and Problems of a Concept. McGill-Queen's University Press. ISBN 978-0-2280-0951-1.
- Strous, Rael D. (2007). "Psychiatry during the Nazi Era: Ethical Lessons for the Modern Professional". Annals of General Psychiatry. 6 (8) 8. doi:10.1186/1744-859X-6-8. PMC 1828151. PMID 17326822.
- Tanaka, Yuki (2023). "The Nanjing Massacre". In Kiernan, Ben; Lower, Wendy; Naimark, Norman; Straus, Scott (eds.). The Cambridge World History of Genocide. Vol. III: Genocide in the Contemporary Era, 1914–2020. Cambridge University Press. pp. 379–399. doi:10.1017/9781108767118. ISBN 978-1-108-48707-8.
- Tatz, Colin; Higgins, Winton (2016). The Magnitude of Genocide. Santa Barbara, CA: ABC-CLIO. ISBN 978-1-4408-3161-4. LCCN 2015042289. OCLC 930059149.
- Tauger, Mark (1 July 2018). "Review of Anne Applebaum's 'Red Famine: Stalin's War on Ukraine'". History News Network. George Washington University. Archived from the original on 28 June 2024.
- Tomasevich, Jozo (1975). War and Revolution in Yugoslavia, 1941–1945: The Chetniks. Stanford: Stanford University Press. ISBN 978-0-8047-0857-9.
- Tomasevich, Jozo (2001). War and Revolution in Yugoslavia, 1941–1945: Occupation and Collaboration. Stanford: Stanford University Press. ISBN 978-0-8047-7924-1.
- Totten, Samuel; Parsons, William S. (1997). Century of genocide: critical essays and eyewitness accounts. Routledge. ISBN 978-0-203-89043-1.
- Towner, Emil B. (2011). "Quantifying Genocide: What Are We Really Counting (On)?". JAC. 31 (3/4): 625–638. ISSN 2162-5190. JSTOR 41709663.
- Travis, Hannibal (2013). Ethnonationalism, Genocide, and the United Nations. Routledge. ISBN 978-0-415-53125-2.
- Tulchin, Joseph S. & Bland, Gary, eds. (1992). Is There a Transition to Democracy in El Salvador?. L. Rienner Publishers. ISBN 9781555873103.
- Uehling, Greta (2015). "Genocide's Aftermath: Neostalinism in Contemporary Crimea". Genocide Studies and Prevention. 9 (1): 3–17. doi:10.5038/1911-9933.9.1.1273.
- Üngör, Uğur Ümit (2009). Young Turk social engineering: mass violence and the nation state in eastern Turkey, 1913-1950 (PDF) (Thesis). University of Amsterdam. hdl:11245/1.319592. S2CID 129130138.
- ——— (2011). The Making of Modern Turkey: Nation and State in Eastern Anatolia, 1913–1950. Oxford University Press. ISBN 978-0-19-965522-9.
- van Bruineßen, Martin (1994), "Genocide in Kurdistan? The suppression of the Dersim rebellion in Turkey (1937–38) and the chemical war against the Iraqi Kurds (1988)", in Andreopoulos, George J. (ed.), Conceptual and historical dimensions of genocide (PDF), University of Pennsylvania Press, pp. 141–170, archived from the original (PDF) on 21 May 2013
- Vanthemsche, Guy (2012). Belgium and the Congo, 1885–1980. Cambridge; New York: Cambridge University Press. ISBN 978-0-521-19421-1.
- Vérité, Clément (24 April 2022). "A 'truth trial' in Argentina, 98 years after the Napalpí massacre of Indigenous people". Newsendip. World news you missed. Archived from the original on 9 December 2023.
- Viola, Lynne (2014). "Collectivization in the Soviet Union: Specificities and Modalities". The Collectivization of Agriculture in Communist Eastern Europe: Comparison and Entanglements. Central European University Press. pp. 49–69. ISBN 978-963-386-048-9.
- Vital, David (October 1987). Zionism: the crucial phase. Oxford University Press. ISBN 978-0198219323.
- Vogelsang, Peter; Larsen, Brian B. M. (2002). "Euthanasia – the 'mercy killing' of disabled people in Germany". The Danish Center for Holocaust and Genocide Studies. Archived from the original on 3 March 2016.
- Walker, Christopher J. (1980). Armenia, the Survival of a Nation. St. Martin's Press. ISBN 978-0-312-04944-7.
- Weisbord, Robert G. (2003). "The King, the Cardinal and the Pope: Leopold II's genocide in the Congo and the Vatican". Journal of Genocide Research. 5: 35–45. doi:10.1080/14623520305651. S2CID 73371517.
- Weissman, Gary (2004). Fantasies of Witnessing: Postwar Attempts to Experience the Holocaust. Cornell University Press. ISBN 978-0-8014-4253-7.
- Weiss-Wendt, Anton (December 2005). "Hostage of Politics: Raphael Lemkin on 'Soviet Genocide'". Journal of Genocide Research. 7 (4). Routledge: 551–559. doi:10.1080/14623520500350017. ISSN 1462-3528. S2CID 144612446.
- Wheatcroft, Stephen G. (2018). "The Turn Away from Economic Explanations for Soviet Famines". Contemporary European History. 27 (3): 465–469. doi:10.1017/S0960777318000358. hdl:10536/DRO/DU:30116832.
- ——— (August 2020). "The Complexity of the Kazakh Famine: Food Problems and Faulty Perceptions". Journal of Genocide Research. 23 (4): 593–597. doi:10.1080/14623528.2020.1807143. S2CID 225333205.
- Wolowyna, Oleh (October 2020). "A Demographic Framework for the 1932–1934 Famine in the Soviet Union". Journal of Genocide Research. 23 (4): 501–526. doi:10.1080/14623528.2020.1834741. S2CID 226316468.
- Wolowyna, Oleh (2 October 2021). "A Demographic Framework for the 1932–1934 Famine in the Soviet Union". Journal of Genocide Research. 23 (4): 501–526. doi:10.1080/14623528.2020.1834741. S2CID 226316468.
- Wright, Ronald (2004). A Short History of Progress. Toronto: House of Anansi Press. ISBN 978-0-88784-706-6.
- Yacoub, Joseph (1985). La question assyro-chaldéenne, les Puissances européennes et la SDN (1908–1938) [The Assyro-Chaldean question: the European Powers and the League of Nations, 1908–38] (thèse) (in French). Lyon.
- Yakovlev, Alexander Nikolaevich (2002). A Century of Violence in Soviet Russia. Yale University Press. ISBN 0-300-08760-8. Archived from the original on 19 November 2014.
- Yang, Daqing (2001). "Convergence or Divergence? Recent Historical Writings on the Rape of Nanjing". Perennial. 104 (3): 842–865. doi:10.2307/2650991. ISBN 978-0060931308. JSTOR 2650991.
- Yeomans, Rory (2013). Visions of Annihilation: The Ustasha Regime and the Cultural Politics of Fascism, 1941–1945. Pittsburgh: University of Pittsburgh Press. ISBN 978-0-8229-7793-3.
- Ye'or, Bat; Kochan, Miriam; Littman, David (2002). Islam and Dhimmitude: Where Civilizations Collide. Fairleigh Dickinson University Press. ISBN 978-0-8386-3943-6. OCLC 47054791.
- Yoshida, Hiroshi (1998). Ten'nō no guntai to Nankin jiken: Mō hitotsu no hi-chū sensō-shi 天皇の軍隊と南京事件: もうひとつの日中戦争史 [The Emperor's Army and the Nanjing Massacre: Another History of the Sino-Japanese War] (in Japanese). Aoki shoten. p. 160. ISBN 978-4250980190.
- Yoshida, Takashi (2006). The Making of the "Rape of Nanking". New York: Oxford University Press.
- Yuanheng, Tan; Xiangqiong, Ao Ye (2019). "Nán shítou dà túshā: Shǐyòng xìjùn de"shārén gōngchǎng"" 南石头大屠杀：使用细菌的"杀人工厂" [Nanshitou Massacre: A "Killing Factory" Using Bacteria]. Hong Kong War History Research Association (in Chinese). Archived from the original on 9 February 2020.
- Zając, Piotr (2008). "Prześladowania Ludności Narodowości Polskiej na Terenie Wołynia w Latach 1939–1945 – Ocena Karnoprawna Zdarzeń w Oparciu O Ustalenia Śledztwa OKŚZpNP w Lublinie" [Persecution of Polish ethnics in the area of Volyn in 1939–1945 – criminal law assessment of events based on the findings of investigations OKŚZpNP in Lublin] ( (PDF)). In Ignatiew, Radosław (ed.). Zbrodnie Przeszłości: Opracowania i materiały prokuratorów IPN [Crimes of the Past: Studies and materials of the IPN prosecutors] (in Polish). Vol. 2. Warsaw: The Institute of National Remembrance. pp. 34–49. Archived from the original on 6 March 2016.
- Zubaida, S. (July 2000). "Contested nations: Iraq and the Assyrians" (PDF). Nations and Nationalism. 6 (3): 363–382. doi:10.1111/j.1354-5078.2000.00363.x.
