= The Cambridge History of Turkey =

Book series on the history of Turkey

The Cambridge History of Turkey is a four-volume series on the history of the Ottoman Empire and Republic of Turkey.

The fourth volume was criticized for almost omitting the Armenian genocide, which it did not classify as a genocide, and never mentioning the Assyrian genocide or Greek genocide.

== Titles ==
1. Byzantium to Turkey 1071–1453 (2006)
2. The Ottoman Empire as a World Power, 1453–1603 (2008)
3. The Later Ottoman Empire, 1603–1839 (2009)
4. Turkey in the Modern World, 1839–2012 (2012)
