= Pontic Greek genocide =

1914–1923 genocide in the Ottoman Empire

- Part of the Greek genocide
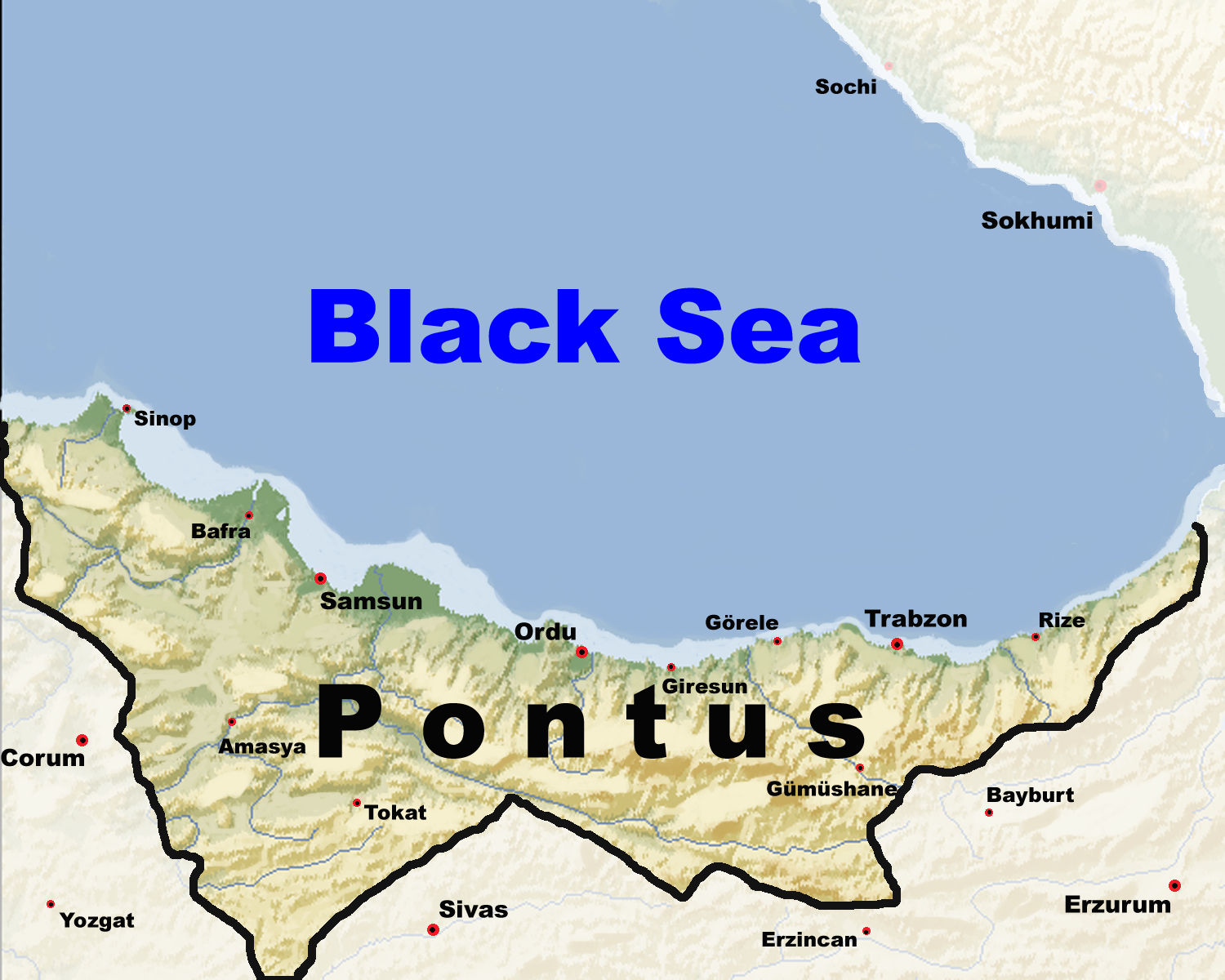
- The genocide took place in the Black Sea region of present-day Turkey between 1914 and 1923, where a substantial Pontic Greek population lived.
- Location: Pontus region in northeastern Anatolia
- Date: 1914–1923
- Target: Pontic Greeks
- Attack type: Genocide, mass murder, death marches, ethnic cleansing, mass deportation, labour battalions
- Deaths: 350,000–360,000
- Perpetrators: Committee of Union and Progress, Turkish National Movement, Ottoman State
- Motive: Anti-Greek sentiment, Turkification, Anti-Eastern Orthodox sentiment

The Pontic Greek genocide, or the Pontic genocide (Greek: Γενοκτονία των Ελλήνων του Πόντου), was the deliberate and systematic destruction of the indigenous Greek community in the Pontus region (the northeast of modern Turkey) in the Ottoman Empire during World War I and its aftermath.

The Pontic Greeks had a continuous presence in the Pontus region from at least 700 BC, over 2,500 years ago. Following the Ottoman conquest of the Empire of Trebizond in 1461, the area came under the control of the Ottoman Empire. The rise of Turkish nationalism at the beginning of 20th century dramatically increased anti-Greek sentiment within the Ottoman Empire. The genocide began in 1914 by the Committee of Union and Progress regime, which was led by the Three Pashas, and, after a short interwar pause in 1918–1919, continued into 1923 by the Kemalist regime which was led by Mustafa Kemal Pasha.

Although resisted by a thriving Greek guerrilla movement, both Turkish nationalist movements succeeded in massacring the Pontians and deporting them to the interior regions of Anatolia. This resulted in approximately 350,000 deaths – about half of the pre-genocide Pontic population.

The genocide ended with the deportation of the survivors to Greece during the population exchange between Greece and Turkey in 1923. The Pontic genocide is part of the wider Greek genocide, but it is often covered separately because of the geographic isolation of Pontus and several political and historical features.

== Background ==
From 700 BC, Pontic Greeks lived close to the southern coast of the Black Sea in the Pontus region. They had a strong culture with many important Greek philosophers and authors. In the 11th century, the Turks started moving to central Anatolia, which is now Turkey, and to the Pontus region. Under the Byzantine Empire (395–1453), the two groups coexisted peacefully with each other. Following the incorporation of the Pontus region into the Ottoman Empire, Pontic Greeks remained a predominantly Christian community within the empire's millet system. They were treated unequally relative to other ethnic groups because they were a Christian minority. Many Christian Greeks had better education and higher economic positions in the empire, much to the dismay of Ottoman officials. Religion was viewed as a sign of loyalty in the Ottoman Empire, but most Pontics refused to convert to Islam in spite of Ottoman pressure. Subsequently, they were consistently viewed as a threat to the nation. Many Pontic Greeks were active in commerce, education and maritime trade, although their social and economic circumstances varied considerably across regions and periods. During the late nineteenth and early twentieth centuries, Ottoman authorities increasingly viewed some Pontic Greek organisations with suspicion amid rising nationalist movements and conflicts in the empire.

The Young Turk Revolution greatly affected the Pontic Greeks living in Anatolia. One of the political goals of the Young Turk movement was to "Turkify" the Ottoman Empire. Their goal was to unite the Turkish people through religion, history and culture. Ottoman officials feared that Christian minorities, like the Pontic Greeks, would cause instability in the empire after rebellions staged by the Pontus Greeks in the Black Sea Region emerged. As a result, a violent campaign of genocide began in an attempt to remove non-Muslim minorities from the region, including Pontic Greeks.

In the time between 1914 and 1923, about 353,000 Pontic Greeks were killed and 1.5 million were expelled. Various methods of genocide were used and there were two main phases: CUP and Kemalist.

In their book, The Thirty-Year Genocide, Israeli historians Benny Morris and Dror Ze'evi argue that the massacres were primarily religiously motivated, and allege that Mustafa Kemal himself incited these religious mobs against Christians, including the Pontic Greeks. (Note: Mustafa Kemal was given the honorary title of Ghazi or Muslim warrior.) In 2024, they also argued that:

The murders, expulsions, and forced conversions were ordered by government officials and carried out by other officials, soldiers, gendarmes, policemen and, often, tribesmen and the civilian inhabitants of towns and villages. All of this occurred with the active participation of Muslim clerics and the encouragement of the Turkish-language press.

== First phase (1914–1918) ==
The first repressions of Greeks in 1913–1914 barely reached the Pontus region, as they were mostly directed towards Western Anatolia. Mass deportations in the region began in 1915 in Western Pontus and part of Eastern, which Russian army had not captured yet.

The Ottoman government brutally persecuted the Pontic Greek community, but did not plan a full-scale extermination similar to the Armenian genocide due to multiple factors. The Greeks had a nation-state, unlike the Armenians, so the Committee of Union and Progress did not want to provoke Athens (which were neutral until 1916) into siding with the Entente. Greece also had a Muslim minority and could start a similar campaign toward it.

With this in mind, Unionists followed the tactic of "white massacres": deportations and forced labor.

Pontic Greek men (aged 18–48) were forcibly conscripted into labor battalions and died in large numbers, sometimes over 90 percent. "The life of a Greek in a labor gang is generally about two months", a British intelligence officer held hostage by the Turks in the eastern vilayets estimated. In this way, the CUP regime solved two problems at once; they could move military material and do so by killing Pontic men by indirect means (working them to death). The extermination of fighting-age males was central to the genocidal plans, as it eliminated a significant portion of the population capable of resistance.

Beginning in the countryside and later in urban areas, the Turks raided Pontic Greek homesteads and initiated the deportation process. Victims were marched in caravans, where they usually experienced death rates of 80–90 percent. These caravans were subjected to brutal treatment, well documented by a number of penetrating studies of the genocide. When the escorts desired, they abused victims, sometimes committing massacres through direct killings.

Deportations involved chiefly women and children as, by early 1915, most adult men had been mobilized in labor battalions.

In January 1916, the Russians launched a major offensive. As the result, they broke through the Ottoman defences and by April captured a huge area of Eastern Pontus, including Rize and Trabzon. During the retreat, Kamil Pasha ordered the deportation of Greek villagers. It was conducted in winter, when temperature was close to zero, so many froze on the road. During spring and summer, the authorities continued deportations, which affected dozens of villages in Trabzon vilayet. Some Greeks fled to surrounding forests and mountains. Many women were rounded up and taken to Vazelon Monastery, where Turks "first violated them, and then put them to death".

The government countered Western protests by claiming that the deportations were undertaken for "military reasons" and complaining about interference in its "internal affairs". However, in many regions that were very far from the frontline, Greeks were persecuted as well. For example, residents of the Ünye area were expelled in December 1915. The Greek population of Inebolu and its surrounding villages – Cide, Patheri, Atsidono, Karaca, Askordassi – was deported in June 1916.

German Consul M. Kuckhoff telegraphed on July 16, 1916 from Samsun: "The entire Greek population of Sinope and the coastal region of the district of Kastanomu has been exiled (...) In Turkish the terms deportation and extermination have the same meaning, because in most cases those who are not killed fall victim to disease or starvation."

In a special cable the New York Times of August 21, 1916 reported that Turkish authorities in the Black Sea regions "are rounding up civilians in a considerable number of villages and sending them off in batches to concentration camps in the interior. This means practically a sentence to death, for in large numbers they are forced to go afoot, absolutely without food. En route these pitiful caravans are attacked by Turks, who rob them of whatever they have in their possession, unhappy mothers being deprived of their children. The deportations are on a considerable scale".

During December 1916, the Turks deported notables from Samsun, Bafra, Ordu, Tirebolu, Amasya and Çarşamba, and reportedly hanged 200 Greeks for "desertion". The villagers of the Bafra hinterland were sent "to wander from one village to another". An American naval officer noted that these deportees had been placed in hot baths for "cleaning" and then were marched with very little clothing and food, so they were dying from frost, hunger and exhaustion. In Samsun, after the deportation of notables, mass expulsions were conducted on January 10–13, 1917. Houses of deportees were subsequently plundered and torched or occupied by muhacirs. Survivors of the march were dispersed in Turkish villages. A post-war investigation by an American consul estimates that about 5,000 Greeks were eliminated from the city by massacre, expulsion, and flight to the hills. There were also deportations from the Fatsa, Nikassar, and Çarşamba areas.

== The interwar period (1918–1919) ==
Dead bodies of massacred Pontic Greeks (1918)

In April 1918, 8,000 Greek families were deported from Anatolia. In a German cable of 12 May 1918 to the German Foreign Office, the statements of Ottoman prisoners of war were repeated, who spoke of a "methodical annihilation of the Greeks", due to the general mobilization, the confiscation of property and the deportations. On 30 June 1918, Paul Wolff Metternich wrote to the German Foreign Office that he feared that the Turks were going to annihilate the Greeks, just like they did to the Armenians.

After World War I, the Ottoman Empire and Great Britain signed the Armistice of Mudros. This agreement allowed Greek survivors of the War to go back to their homes in Anatolia. However, most of their homes were destroyed and it was not safe for them to stay there. The armistice also allowed Greece to invade in Turkey if they felt like they needed to protect the Greeks in Anatolia. This is why Greece came to the city of Smyrna on 15 May 1919, an event that contributed to the outbreak of the Greco-Turkish War (1919–1922).

== Second phase (1919–1923) ==
The second phase of the Pontic Greek genocide took place during the Second Greco-Turkish War and resulted in almost complete disappearance of Greeks in area.

=== Kemalist movement ===
American historian Ryan Gingeras noted: While the number of victims in Ankara's deportations remains elusive, evidence from other locations suggest that the Nationalists were as equally disposed to collective punishment and population politics as their CUP antecedents. As in the First World War, the mass deportation of civilians was symptomatic of how precarious the Nationalists felt their prospects were. Swiss historian Hans-Lukas Kieser wrote:

Thus, from spring 1919, Kemal Pasha resumed, with ex-CUP forces, domestic war against Greek and Armenian rivals. These were partly backed by victors of World War I who had, however, abstained from occupying Asia Minor. The war for Asia Minor – in national diction, again a war of salvation and independence, thus in line with what had begun in 1913 – accomplished Talaat's demographic Turkification on the beginning of World War I. Resuming Talaat's Pontus policy of 1916–17, this again involved collective physical annihilation, this time of the Rûm of Pontus at the Black Sea.

British historian Mark Levene argued:

The CUP committed genocide to transform the residual empire into a streamlined, homogeneous nation-state on the European model. Once the CUP had started the process, the Kemalists, freed from any direct European pressure by the 1918 defeat and capitulation of Germany, went on to complete it, achieving what nobody believed possible: the reassertion of independence and sovereignty via an exterminatory war of national liberation.

He also described the Turkish National Movement as such:

It was the hard men, self-styled saviours of the Ottoman-Turkish state, and – culminating in Kemal – unapologetic génocidaires, who were able to wrest its absolute control.

According to Dutch-Turkish historian and sociologist Uğur Ümit Üngör:

When the CUP dissolved itself in 1918, it continued functioning under other names and succeeded in launching Mustafa Kemal to organize the Anatolian resistance it had planned since 1914. After a transition process many of the CUP's most diligent social engineers ended up working for Mustafa Kemal's Republican People's Party (RPP). The resurrection of Young Turk elites gave rise to the establishment of a modern dictatorship of repressive rule, driven by devotion to the tenets of a Gökalpist ideology ... The continuity of discourse and practice of the Kemalist regime in relation to the CUP regime did not take long to manifest itself. Well before Kemalist population politics became well articulated and programmatic, ad hoc and pre-emptive deportations were used to serve the purpose of preventing trouble.

American historian Benjamin Lieberman described the Nationalist attitude towards Pontic Greeks and compared it with CUP's towards Armenians:

The rise of the Nationalists gave the Turks hope, but placed Turkey's Greeks in peril. Ottoman Greeks had suffered persecution during World War 1 even before Greece entered the war. Now with Greece directly involved in war in Anatolia, they feared worse: a radical Turkish Nationalist campaign to purify Turkey ... The most telling evidence of the deportation of the Pontic Greeks came from Turkish Nationalists as they responded to queries about treatment of Greeks from Allied commissioners at Constantinople. Their explanation echoed the Committee of Union and Progress during the Great War: Pontic Greeks were now labeled a traitor people, much as the Armenians had been in 1915. Yet at this point full-scale ethnic cleansing was not far off. The Pontic Greeks, Turkish Nationalists concluded, had stabbed them in the back, and there was no place for them in the new Turkey.

To sum up, despite some differences between these two movements, in terms of policy towards minorities they were very similar. Hence, Kemalists continued CUP ethnic cleansing policy towards Pontic Greeks and other Christian minorities in order to create Turkish national homogeneous country.

Probably for this reason Riza Nur, one of Turkish delegates at Lausanne, wrote that "disposing of people of different races, languages and religions in our country is the most ... vital issue".

=== Mustafa Kemal's arrival in Samsun ===
Following his arrival in Samsun, Mustafa Kemal began organising the Turkish nationalist movement. Some historians argue that nationalist forces subsequently intensified operations against Pontic Greek communities during this period.

Immediately after Kemal's landing in Samsun, a deep contradiction between Greek and Turkish historiography regarding his personality begins. May 19 was subsequently established by the Pontic organizations as the date of the final solution of the Pontic issue and is considered as the day of remembrance of the victims of the Pontic genocide. On the other hand, this date is considered by official Turkish historiography as the beginning of the war for independence, and the Turkish state established a holiday on May 19, Atatürk Memorial Day, Youth and Sports Day (Turkish: Atatürk'ü Anma, Gençlik ve Spor Bayramı).

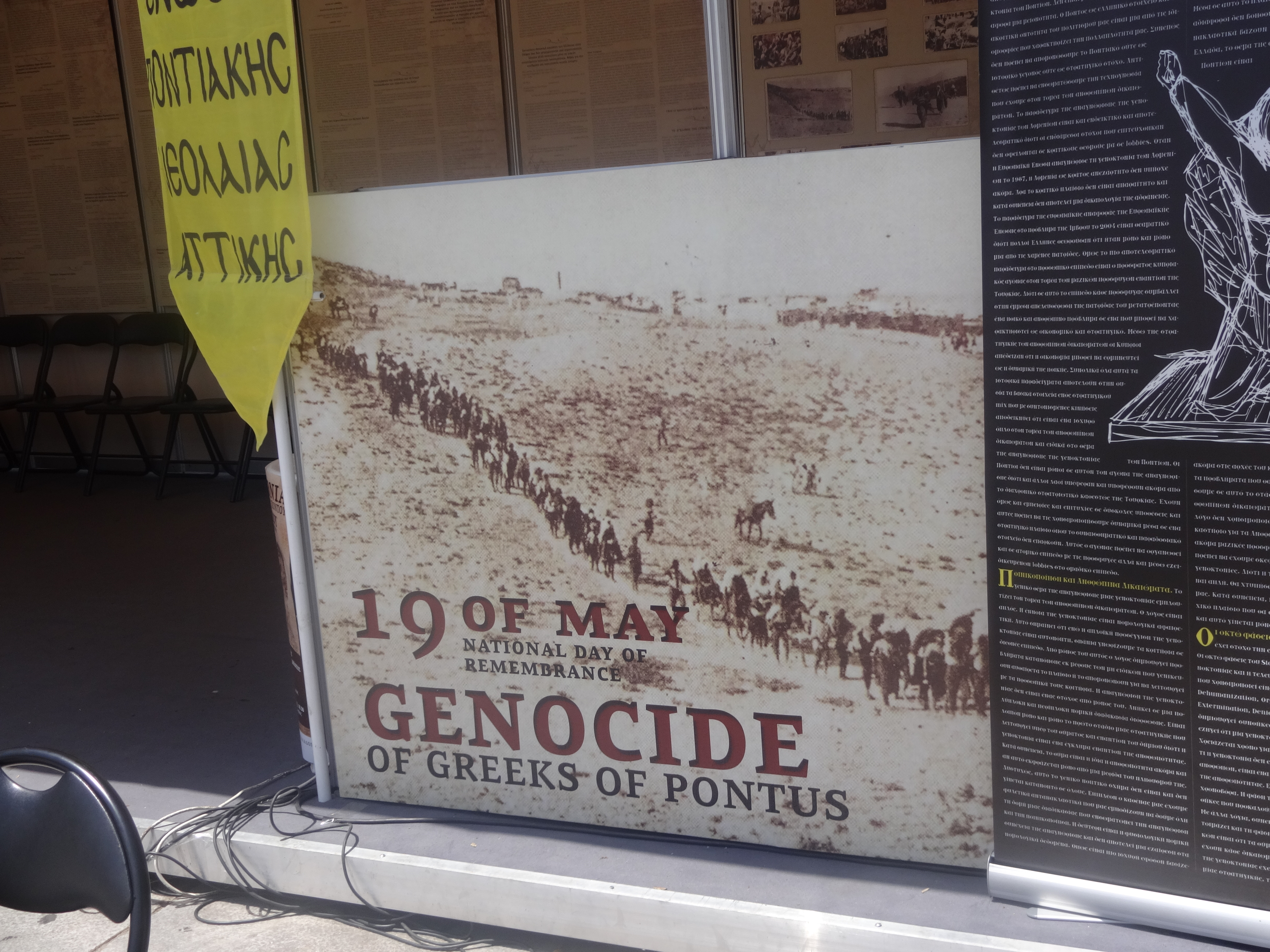
A temporary pavilion in Syntagma Square, Athens, commemorating the Pontic genocide

Considering the nature of that war (for example, incomparability of foreign military losses and civilian deaths among Christian minorities), the term "Turkish Liberation War" (Turkish: Turk Kurtuluş Savaşı) is disputed not only by Greek historians, but also by some modern Turkish and Western historians. Uğur Ümit Üngör states that "As such, the Greco-Turkish and Armeno-Turkish wars (1919–1923) were in essence processes of state formation that represented a continuation of ethnic unmixing and exclusion of Ottoman Christians from Anatolia. The subsequent proclamation of a Turkish nation state on 29 October 1923 was more of an intermezzo than a start or an end". Attila Tuygan in his work Genocide for the motherland writes: "The statement that the Turkish national liberation war was waged against imperialism is based on nothing. On the contrary, as noted by Professor Taner Akcham, the liberation war "was fought not against aggressors, but against minorities"." Preference of this term has also been criticized by Corry Guttstadt as it causes Turkey to be portrayed as "a victim of imperialist forces". In this version of events, minority groups are depicted as a pawn used by these forces. In fact, Ottoman Empire had joined the First World War with expansionist goals. The CUP government intended to expand the Empire into Central Asia. When they were defeated, however, Kemalists, their successors, depicted themselves as the victims, even though the war brought catastrophic consequences for non-Muslim minorities, against which it was actually conducted.

=== Organization of Angora government and continuation of the genocide ===
"Ağa, clean up Pontus well," I said. "I'm cleaning it," he said. "Don't leave stone upon stone in the Greek villages," I said. "That is what I'm doing, but I'm preserving the churches and the good buildings because they might be needed," he said. "Destroy those too; even send their stones far away and scatter them. Just in case, so that they can't say that there was a church here again," I said. "Indeed, let's do that. I hadn't thought of that," he said.

— Riza Nur to Topal Osman, (Hayat ve Hatıratım. Vol. 3. İstanbul: İşaret Yayınları, 1992, p. 164).

The Nationalists were worried about the permanent occupation and Hellenization of certain Anatolian regions, particularly with the prospect of Ionia coming under direct Athenian rule, because it might cause the separatism of other Ottoman Greeks. The fear of rebellion by Greeks, leading to the establishment of a Pontic state along the Black Sea, intensified significantly after the Greek landing in Smyrna on May 15. This became one of main reasons (and justifications) for the final stage of the genocide.

In late May 1919, Kemal, having recently arrived in Samsun, informed Constantinople that since the Armistice there were "forty guerrilla bands", engaged in an "organized program", and were killing Turks to "establish a Pontus state". However, the reality was completely different. All this separatist hubbub resulted in no organized acts of rebellion and very few instances of anti-Turkish actions. The majority of Ottoman Greeks, both in the Pontus and elsewhere in Anatolia, were not swayed by ethnic-nationalist appeals. An American diplomat who visited major Pontic cities in the summer of 1919 noted that "many of the most influential and rational Greeks ... in Trebizond viewed this policy [of separatism] with disfavor". Even the local Greek Archbishop, Chrysantonos, opposed it. The reasons for the reluctance of Ottoman Greeks to accept the pan-Hellenic national message, let alone act upon it, remain unclear. It could be attributed to a lack of well-developed political consciousness or centuries of submission to Islamic dominance. Additionally, the fear of massacres, similar to what had happened to Armenians, likely played a significant role. Demographic factors were also important, as Turks were the majority in Pontus, as they were in Anatolia as a whole, and Pontic Greeks were aware of this, regardless of what their representatives occasionally claimed.

During 1919, the Nationalists already massacred about 12,000 Pontic Greeks throughout at least two dozen towns and villages.

By early 1920, the Kemalist anti-Greek propaganda was in full swing. It had two main goals: intimidate Greeks and convince Turks that they are enemies. Nationalist army officers toured villages near Samsun, blaming Christians for the Allied occupation of Constantinople and advocating for their extermination. In Unye and Fatsa, Turks posted placards, blaming Christians "for all their troubles". Kemalists arrested and deported Polycacpos, the Greek bishop of the mixed town of Ordu, to Ankara. Turks patrolled the town fully armed, except when Allied ships were in port, leading Christians to fear leaving their homes. In Samsun Nationalists, emphasizing "the religious side of the question", incited the Turkish population by "preaching a Holy War". They accused the Greeks of violating Turkish women and desecrating the Holy Tombs of Sheikhs in captured towns like Bursa. Some members of GNAT proposed a law calling for the deportation of all Greeks from the Black Sea region. However, it was not adopted officially, because Kemal preferred less publicized methods at this time.

In the summer of 1920 Osman Aga, the brigand leader who was now also mayor of Giresun, pillaged coastal villages. In Giresun itself, on the night of August 13, Osman imprisoned all the Christian men. Thereafter every evening five or six Christians were taken out and shot, until the Christian community paid a ransom of 300,000 Turkish lira. While their husbands were in jail, "the women were violated". Some Greek men were subsequently deported inland from both Giresun and Samsun. The Greek towns in the districts of Amissos, Paffra, and Arba had "completely disappeared". Fourteen villages surrounding Trabzon were burned. The Turks burned down all the villages, whose inhabitants were either killed or driven away, to die on the roads for the most part.

Largescale campaign began in March 1920 in Izmit and in September 1920 in Cappadocia, but not in Pontus yet. However, Nationalist policy eliminated illusions about future of the Pontians.

=== Campaign of extermination ===
In our view, the Greeks in our country are a snake. The poison of this snake is its women. Therefore, we treated them the same as the men. We did not separate them from their children.

— Nurettin Pasha, (Mustafa Balcıoğlu, Bir Paşa İki İsyan: Koçgiri, Pontus, Babil Yayınları, 2003, pp. 275, 280)

What the CUP was afraid to do systematically to the Greeks, the Turkish National Movement accomplished as soon as they got such opportunity.

Although persecutions had already begun around 1919–1920, the full-scale operation in Pontus started in March 1921. It was mainly led by Central Army under general Nureddin Pasha, and irregulars (Çetes) under Topal Osman. Kemalists argued there was Pontic rebellion, Greeks were killing Turks, and Pontic Greeks had joined the Greek army. Western observers unequivocally refuted the existence of an ongoing or planned Pontic "rebellion". The arrival of a Greek naval squadron in the Black Sea in the summer of 1921 was also cited by the Nationalists and their supporters as an excuse, as it stopped Turkish ships, captured passengers and lightly shelled Inebolu. This might have accelerated deportations, but it was certainly not the campaign's cause, which had started months before. As Count Schmeccia of Lloyd Triestino in Samsun, who was formerly an Italian High Commission representative, noted, the Inebolu bombardment, which had brought no casualties, served only as a "Turkish excuse for the massacres".

In the midst of the Greek offensive in Asia Minor, and immediately after the Battle of Kütahya–Eskişehir which was victorious for the Greek army, Metropolitan Germanos arrived in Kütahya, where he proposed to send one regiment by sea to Pontus, which, together with detachments of local partisans, would move to the rear of Kemal. General Victor Dusmanis answered, "not a single soldier, especially since in a month I will be in Ankara". Dusmanis' response deprived Turkish historiographers of the opportunity to directly link the continuation of the Pontic genocide with the "Greek intervention".

Early 1921 saw renewed mass conscription of able-bodied Greeks. They were destined for labor battalions, which, "in reality", a missionary wrote, meant they would "starve or freeze to death". Also Turkish authorities made false birth certificates declaring Greek orphans to be older than they actually were. In this way, teenage boys were also conscripted into labour battalions.

The campaign of extermination began during the spring, affecting rural Greek communities. In the villages of Black Sea's Duzce (Kurtsuyu) kaza, many elderly people were burned alive. Villages around Alacam, Bafra, and Çarşamba were also attacked, as well as inland areas like Havza and Visirkopru. Turks were meticulous to avoid American witnesses. So missionaries were confined to Samsun, the regional missionary center. However, survivors reached the town and told their stories. American naval officers reported that the campaign was "under strict control of the military", "directed by high authority – probably Angora [Ankara]", and conducted, at least partially, by soldiers. An eyewitness detailed that villages near Bafra faced "incendiarism, shooting, slaying, hanging, and outranging". The villages were left "turned to heaps of ruins".

By summer, the operation had extended to towns. In Bafra, the local Greek elite were invited to a dinner, where they were all slaughtered. Turks then rounded up and massacred young Greek men. On June 5, Bafra was besieged by Turkish troops and paramilitary formations, which demanded surrender from men. Some hid. Turks then searched and pillaged houses, violating women. Men were taken away, escorted by convoys. Seven Bafra priests were hacked to death, the fate of the other men was not better. The first convoy went to the nearby village of Blezli, where all imprisoned where killed. One, Nicholas Jordanoglon, paid 300 Turkish lira to be shot rather than butchered with an axe or bayonet. 500 men, from the second convoy, were burned alive in the church in Selamelik. Another 680, from the third, were murdered in the church at Kavdje-son. Approximately 1,300 Greeks (the last two convoys) were killed in the Kavak gorge on August 15 or 16. Ankara's government argued that those men at Kavak had been killed in battle, following an alleged attack by "Greek bands" on Turks. On August 31, about 6,000 Greek women and children from Bafra were deported, with an additional 2,500 on September 19. The only Greeks permitted to remain were the ailing individuals who paid bribes. An American group encountered a procession of 4,000 Bafran women and children near Sivas. Their faces were exhausted, they were scantily clothed, many had no shoes, and it appeared they had no food. Approximately seventy elderly men were present as well.

In early August, the Tekâlif-i Milliye was issued, allowing the Turkish government to confiscate all "abandoned" property left behind by deported Greeks, never paying them back. During the same month, the mutassarif of Bafra informed an American naval officer that the "deportation of all remaining Greeks, including women and children, had been ordered by Angora". That order was followed by another, from Nureddin Pasha, who instructed a local governor "to proceed with all dispatch to carry out the orders he had been given, or he would soon cease to be mutassarif". An American officer who regularly visited the Pontus ports wrote that he could understand the deportation of adult males "as an inevitable consequence of the war", but "to treat poor women and helpless children ... in such a cruel and inhumane manner is an ... unpardonable sin against civilization".

In nearby Çarşamba, Christian women were rounded up, and most of them were sent on a death march, while 18 of the most attractive were kidnapped and "held for the pleasure of the troops under Osman Aga". As reported by a Greek observer, Osman massacred those deported near Tersakan river. A few days later, the abducted women were burned alive in a house in the town of Kavza.

Habil Bey, a Circassian landowner from Bafra, sheltered 122 Greek civilians and paid for their escape by sea in 1921. He subsequently fled to Greece after the Turkish authorities began searching for him.

In other areas around Bafra, deportations were consistently accompanied by massacres. In Surmeli, 300 people were gathered in houses and burned alive. Ten villages, including Bey Alan, paid off their persecutors. However, some of their men were subsequently deported, and others fled to the mountains. In February 1922, Turks, directed by Fethi, swept through Bafra's hinterland and either captured or killed those hiding in the mountains. Generally, in the Bafra vicinity, 90% of deported Greeks died.

By August, all men in the Ordu region had been expelled.

Samsun, the heart of the Pontus, was also one of the main targets (see Samsun deportations). In early spring 1921 there were some nightly murders in the streets, witnessed by missionaries. During late spring, Topal Osman and his bandits were looting and burning Greek settlements around the city and killing civilian Greek population. On May 28, 200 Greek men were sent away from Samsun, supposedly to Diyarbekir. But main massacres and deportations occurred, as in Bafra, in summer. On June 16, the Nationalist government of Ankara authorized the deportation of all Greek males between ages 16 and 50, so police began to round up them. This deportations were carried out by Nureddin Pasha. American Near East Relief workers in Samsun determined that all the deportees "were being sent to their deaths". They also noticed the impunity with which Turkish irregulars were committing murders on the streets of the city. On 19 June, American officers reported, about 2,000 men were marched into the interior, some – with their families. In mid-July, the remaining Greeks in and around Samsun were informed that the women and children would also have to go, within three days. "Everywhere in the Greek quarter one hears women and children crying their lungs out ... They know that they were going to their death. The police have directed that all valuables should be turned into the Greek church before leaving," a US naval officer reported. As a result, the NER orphanage at Samsun was flooded with Greek children from the region. One missionary later recalled, "Our house was surrounded by these poor women, hammering at our doors, holding out their children, begging us to take this children if we could not save the women. They threw their arms about our necks and we never felt so helpless in our lives". Most deportees were marched through Amasya and Sivas to Harput, and from there to Diyarbakir, Bitlis, and Van.

As a result of the deportations that were ordered in June, nearly 21,000 people were forcefully deported from Samsun. In early September 1921, 1,500 women and children from nearby Greek villages who had recently found temporary refuge in the city were deported. In mid-November 1921, 700 women and children who had earlier fled to the hills returned to Samsun for fear of cold due to the approaching winter. The Turkish authorities did not hesitate to deport them altogether. Some reactions by the head of the Near East Relief to stop at least part of the deportation were ignored by the local Turkish governor.

Villages around Samsun were also cleansed of Greeks. One report described Turkish "excesses" as "savage beyond description". According to escaped refugees, villages from which men have been deported have been surrounded, fired into by troops and [set] afire, women and children caught escaping being forced back into flames ... Turks sneeringly tell Greek women to get help from Americans". In two nearby towns, Sinop and Gerze, during September and October 1921, Turks rounded up and deported "all the [stray] Christian children ... between the ages of 9 and 12". The commander of USS Fox which was stationed off Samsun, reported that c. 100 surrounding Greek villages were destroyed, their inhabitants killed and the priests were crucified.

A local Greek survivor recalled that when his village attacked in 1921 by Topal Osman, who was already the Mayor of Giresun, and his men, who were armed with guns and axes: "They gathered people in the middle of the village. They separated off the children. They stripped them and threw them into wells. Then they threw stones on top of them. The wells groaned. They filled the church, the school, and the barns with the old people and set fire to them."

In December a missionary summed up his feelings about the authorities who sent Greeks of Samsun to their death, "packed into a barn and burned alive, men, women, and children". He claimed to know the men responsible. "The officers who carried out this diabolical massacre have been here again and again in my home drinking tea and telling me that all the stories about Turks being cruel were lies", he explained. "And this at the time when they were plotting this new atrocity".

But the most notorious massacre in the Pontus that summer occurred in Merzifon, just south of the Black Sea coast. The town had a mixed population of Greeks, Armenians, and Turks, as well as an American missionary contingent, which returned after the suspension of their activities during WW1. The missionaries ran a hospital, and many worked in Anatolia College, which itself had a mixed population of students and faculty. It is thanks in large part to the international missionary network that the slaughter at Merzifon became so well known. Topal Osman and his band of 'cut-throats' entered the town and killed 1,000–1,500 Greeks and Armenians in a massacre that lasted 4 days. Before the massacre, Merzifon was home to 2,000–2,500 Christians. Almost all men were killed, along with some women and children. Afterward, the remaining Greeks were deported. The affair was enough to convince the American missionary Gertrude Anthony that "the plan of the Young Turk Committee in 1915 has not been abandoned by these Turks ... now in power ... The Christians in Asiatic Turkey are doomed". Nationalists initially denied the massacre: "It is not exact that the population of Merzifoun has been massacred and dispersed", Youssouf Kemal, the Nationalist minister of external affairs, announced. It was a "legend". Later, after telling evidence had surfaced, Nationalists switched tack and argued that "the troops simply got from under control". Alternatively, they also claimed that brigands were to blame – not the army.

Soon afterward Osman and his brigands moved to the area of Tirebolu and Giresun, where, after killing many Greeks and deporting others he took the most beautiful women for himself and his men. Due to his activity, Topal Osman was portrayed as a "national hero" by the Turkish press in Ankara. He was subsequently welcomed with great funfare in Ankara and placed in command of 6,000 men. According to American missionary, his portrait appeared on a Nationalist postage stamp.

Soviet diplomat Semen Aralov, who had visited Samsun area in 1922, later wrote:

Now this rich, densely populated place in Turkey has undergone incredible devastation. Of the entire Greek population of the Samsun, Sinop and Amasia sanjaks, only a few bands remained roaming the mountains. Osman Agha, Laz leader, became especially famous for his atrocities. He went through the entire area with fire and sword with his wild horde.

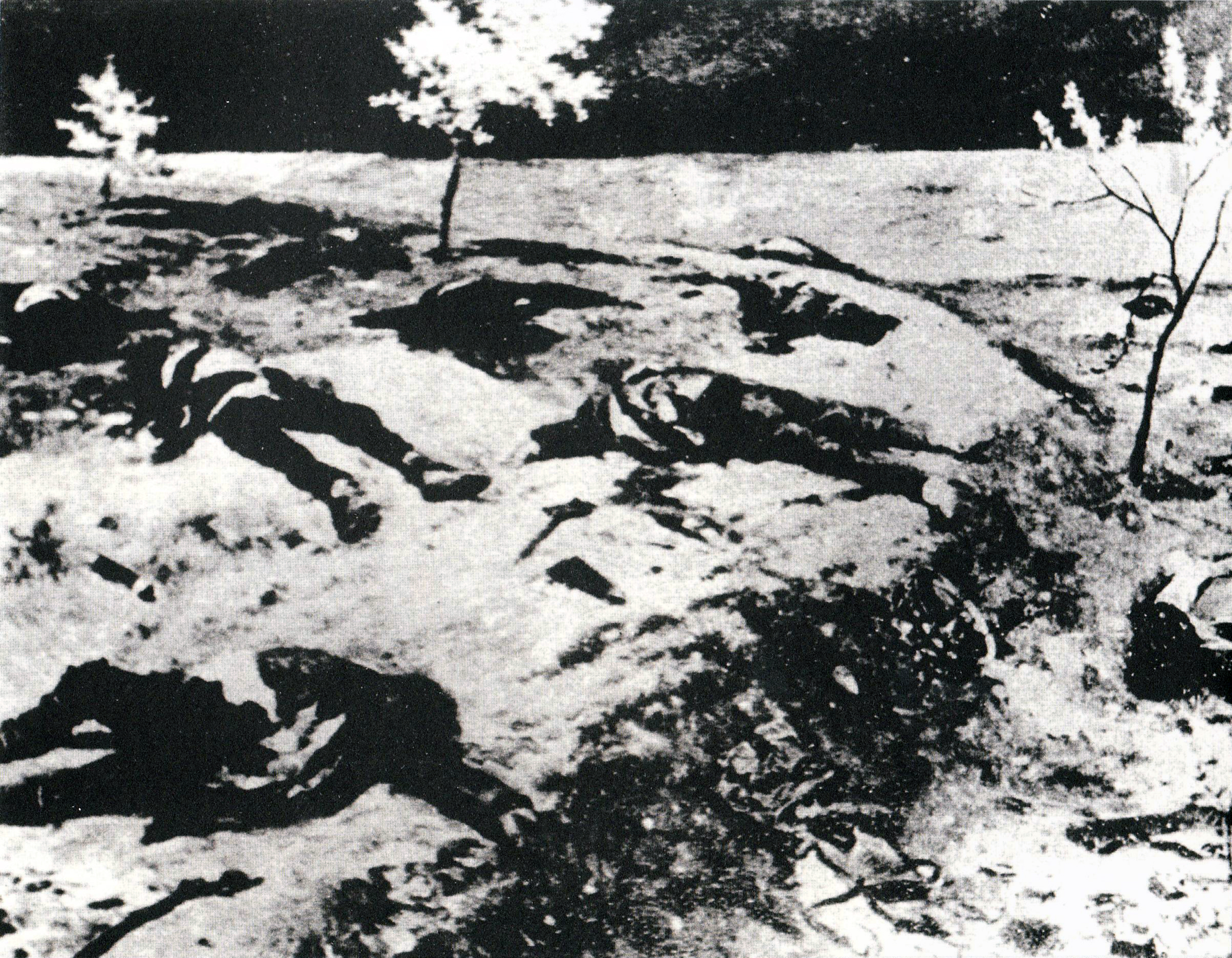
Massacred Greeks in Giresun region, 1921

There was some local Muslim opposition to this actions. But it could not change anything because of authoritarian essence of Kemal's regime. For example, when it turned out that Greek women and children were going to be deported from Samsun, seventy Turkish notables telegraphed Kemal, saying that it was against their religion to massacre women and children. The dissenters recommended deporting them to Greece instead. Kemal responded by emphasizing atrocities committed by Greeks against Turks and described expulsion of Samsun's Greeks as a "merciful act". The authorities then threatened to charge the dissenters with "disloyality". They backed down and promised not to take further steps to oppose deportations.

Two witnesses related that in August 1921 the authorities in Trabzon ordered all adult Greek men to present themselves for paid labor on fortifications. Five hundred or more complied; they were immediately imprisoned and their homes pillaged. The men were then deported to the interior in groups of fifty and forced to march for seven days "without as much as a morsel of bread." One night they were taken away in groups of ten and shot.

Simultaneously, Kemalists were liquidating Greek intellectuals, businessmen and priests (see Amasya trials). Platon, Metropolitan of Samsun, was executed in September 1921. Turks extracted his gold teeth. In Ordu, 190 prominent Greeks were reportedly hanged. In Tokat, ten were executed. Seventy-nine were condemned to death in Samsun. In one case, father and son were reportedly given the option of deciding which of them would go first. Seven priests from Alacam, Bafra, and their environs were crucified in the marketplace of Gozkoy, according to the Greek Patriarchate in Constantinople. Another priest was reportedly crucified in Topedjik. Nationalists treated Christian clergy with particular brutality. Many were murdered; others were exiled or imprisoned.

=== Final stage ===
Therefore, in order to cleanse, to purify as quickly as possible these Greeks who for eight years have truly been a calamity upon the country, I believe that I have taken the most effective measures undertaken so far ...

— Ali Fethi Okyar, (Türkiye Büyük Millet Meclisi. (10 June 1922). Gizli Celse Zabıtları (Dönem 1, Cilt 3, 50. İçtima, 3. Celse), p. 369)

In early spring 1922 Nationalists renewed campaign with the aim of definitely solving the Greek problem as quickly as possible. As Rumbold put it in February, "Many people in Anatolia and at Constantinople considered that history had intended that the old Ottoman Empire composed of so many heterogeneous elements should disappear. Nationalists accepted this fact. A new Turkey had arisen which repudiated bad traditions of [the] former Ottoman Empire". But the perpetrators did not want to be too blatant. They set in motion a variety of conflicting measures and issued contradictory statements about their intentions, leaving Western observers at least briefly confused about what was happening. Sometimes Christians were ordered to stay put or return to towns or relocate within a given town. But mostly people were deported or massacred.

In April 1922, the commander of the USS Fox, William Leahy, reported that on 10 or 11 April, an additional 1,300 Greeks were deported from Samsun, mostly women and children, but also a few old men. Another 1,462 Greek women and children, many of them recently arrived from the mountains, were deported inland on April 15. "The deportation was conducted in a quiet and orderly manner", according to a witness, but the wife of a Turkish officer later reported that Greeks had been "marched into the hills near Kavak and murdered". In Mamuret-ul-Aziz many Christians were forced to convert.

Topal Osman and his çetes moved to Ordu, where few men remained, but many women and children still did. They picked some women and girls from the crowd. Then the soldiers forced all other Greeks to go into two buildings, which they set on fire. The selected women were raped during the night, and slaughtered the next day. Osman's squads did the same in nine nearby villages.

By May Rumbold was reporting that fresh "outrages are starting in all parts of Asia Minor from northern sea ports to southeastern districts". Mark Ward, the Near East Relief director in Harput, explained that Turks were "accelerating their activities in this respect before [a] peace settlement" was reached with the Allies. "The Turks appear to be working on a deliberate plan to get rid of minorities". Turks would collect Greeks from Samsun and Trabzon in Amasya and then March them "via Tokat and Sivas as far as Caesaera [Kayseri], and then back again until they are eventually sent through Harput to the east. In this manner a large number of deportees die on the road from hardships and exposure. The Turks can say that they did not actually kill these refugees, but a comparison may be instituted with the way in which the Turks formerly got rid of dogs at Constantinople by landing them on an island were they died of hunger and thirst". According to Rumbold, Turkish officials told Wars that "in 1915 Turks had not made a clean job of massacres ... next time Turks would take care to do their job thoroughly".

Trabzon and its hinterland were a focus of the new deportations. In 1921 the deportation plans had been suspended there because of protests by local notables. At one point the Trabzon Turks had collected hundreds of Christian boys aged eleven to fourteen and imprisoned them "in a filthy dungeon underground" from which they were to be sent to an "internment camp" near Cevizlik. But prominent Cevizlik Turks came to Trabzon to protest against the "unparalleled inhumanity" at the camp. They were "beaten and sent away", but Trabzon's mayor was said to have done what he could to "protect little boys", and the vali also reportedly "opposed ... massacres and persecutions". However, he ultimately was "powerless", according to Rumbold. "His predecessor tried" to halt the atrocities "and was removed". By early May 1922, Rumbold wrote, "the whole Greek male population from the age of 15 upwards" was "being deported". An American related that they were being deported in groups of fifty every few days. "This will continue until the entire Greek male population" is gone, he was told by a party unnamed in the available documentation.

Ali Sami Bey, a former Ottoman naval officer who fought for Greece during the Greco-Turkish War (1919–1922), leading a militia and attaining the rank of colonel. He was one of few Ottomans speaking against the genocide as late as 1922.

British Lieutenant Colonel A. Rawlinson had been sympathetic to the Turks, but when he traveled as a prisoner to Trebizond he saw that "the coast range and its fertile valleys, hitherto intensively cultivated by the Greeks, was at this time everywhere deserted, the villages being abandoned". He saw gangs of Greek prisoners marching to the interior to replace Armenian forced laborers, most of whom were already dead. By May 1922, Herbert Adams Gibbons of The Christian Science Monitor found Trebizond almost entirely emptied of Greek men. Two years earlier, he estimated, there had been 25,000 Greeks at Trebizond. "Today, between the ages of 80 and 14, the male population numbers 6 priests and 10 civilians".

On June 14 two Greek women called at the NER Personnel House in Trebizond begging for food. They were from the village of Livadia, which was entirely Greek. Most inhabitants, including all men (only three old ones remained), had been deported to Cevizlik four months before. On its outskirts, these two women witnessed seventeen men beheaded and "four girls from fifteen to eighteen years of age taken by officers for immoral purposes" who then were "put to death". In addition, they also saw "three children, nine, ten and twelve years of age killed". Those villagers who remained, were starving: "The women that are left in this village have absolutely nothing to eat. What food they had and the seeds for planting have been taken away by the soldiers". The situation in other villages of Trebizond vilayet was similar: after men had been deported, women and children suffered from famine and many died.

By June 1922 American missionaries were reporting from the Pontus that all villages were empty.

=== Conditions of deportations ===
As bad as the situation became in towns and villages of Pontus, sources indicate that most loss of life occurred on roads during the deportation. As one missionary put it, Turks sought the same outcome for Greeks as they had for Armenians during the World War, but they were "trusting to starvation and exposure to do the work of the sword".

Most convoys consisted of women, children and old men, because the majority of adult men had been either massacred at the start, or placed in labor battalions, where, according to relief workers in Arabkir, "slow starvation [was yet] another method for accomplishing their extermination."

From Aralov's memoirs:

Frunze had moved aside from the askeri (Turkish soldiers) who were accompanying him and with great indignation said that he had seen many corpses of brutally murdered Greeks lying on the road – old men, children, women. "I counted 54 killed children," he said anxiously. – Greeks are chased out of places of rebellions and war, they are killed on the road, or then they themselves fall from fatigue and hunger, and they are abandoned like that. A terrible picture! If you go, I advise you to ride, be sure to look around from time to time and you will see this terrible disgrace. Don't hide my great chagrin from Mustafa Kemal.

An estimated 70,000 Pontus deportees passed through Sivas alone, the women and children "hungry, cold, sick, almost naked, vermin-covered". According to Theda Phelps, a missionary who witnessed the convoys, about 1,000–2,000 Christians arrived each week in such a state that "they little resembled human beings". Phelps spoke with a woman from Bafra, who told her that she had forced her two children to walk the snow-covered mountain paths because she saw that "the children who were being carried were all freezing to death". A British diplomat said that missionaries who had initially "appreciated the Turkish case" ended up "horrified". "Miss Phelps, indeed, admitted that she had left Angora" in autumn 1921 "with a firm belief ... that Mustapha Kemal's Government would bring about a regeneration of Turkey. On arriving on Sivas she was rapidly disillusioned".

Phelps left Sivas for the United States in May 1922. Even this late, a year after the deportations from the Pontus had begun, not far from Sivas the vehicle in which she was riding came across a group of about two hundred women and children being herded on. Not long after that, the car in which Phelps was riding broke down. When the repair party came the next day, it reported that fourteen of those two hundred now lay dead by the road.

In the summer of 1921, an American missionary Ethel Thompson got permission to travel inland from Samsun towards Harput, and on that long journey she was personally able to see what was happening to those who had been forcibly sent out previously: "We crossed Anatolia under a blazing sun, passing groups and groups of old men from Samsoun and the inhabitants of other Black Sea ports walking on, God knows where, driven by Turkish gendarmes. The dead bodies of those who had dropped during the hard tramp were lying by the roadside. Vultures had eaten parts of the flesh so that in most cases merely skeletons remained". By early September Thompson was in Harput, where she encountered "a city full of starving, such, wretched human wrecks". "These people were trying to make a soup of grass and considered themselves fortunate when they could secure a sheep's ear to aid it ... The Turks had given them no food on the 500 mile trip from Samsun". The survivors were only those who had enough money to bribe guards for food: "Those without money died by the wayside. In many places, thirsty in the blistering sun and heat, they were not allowed water unless they could pay for it".

Generally, guards provided convoys neither food nor water. NER workers were often forbidden to supply food, clothing, and water, but occasionally there was no such prohibition. Sometimes Turkish officials allowed columns to rest in towns, families were allowed to leave convoys and stay indefinitely in some places – usually for a fee. However, in most locations, officials quickly drove deportees back onto the roads.

Having worked in Harput for a year, Ethel Thompson remarked: "The heaviest winter weather, when a howling blizzard was raging, during a blinding snowfall, was the favorite time chosen by the Turks to drive the Greeks on. Thousands perished in the snow. The road from Harpoot to Bitlis was lined with bodies." Several times, the American relief director in Harput had begged the Turkish officials to allow the Americans to take into their orphanages the Greek children whose mothers had died along the trails. These requests were refused, but at one point NER in Harput was given an old German missionary building and allowed to take in a number of Greek children. Missionaries issued a week's rations of food and gave kids some clothes. "But in a very few days the building was empty", as Ethel Thompson reported. "The Turks had driven the children over the mountain."

Another observer in Harput, probably the missionary Dr. Ruth Parmelee, said that arriving women and children were "practically naked, sometimes in snow up to the knees, with just some sacking as covering". They had been deported "in a blizzard"; on the roads, "a carriage has sometimes to zigzag to avoid passing over" the corpses.

American relief worker Edit Wood, on his way from Samsun to Harput, noted:

Bodies lay along the roadside and in the fields everywhere. There was no hope for the Greeks from Malatya to Samsun, and the most fortunate were those who perished at the start.

But starvation and exposure did not entirely replace the sword. As we have seen, there were the massacres in and around Kavak Gorge. Elsewhere, a deported attached to the third convoy from Samsun wrote that 660 people were killed by gendarmes as the column was descending a mountain. He survived by feigning death and then escaped to the mountains.

The most detailed and comprehensive description of the convoys during August 1921 - February 1922 comes from two NER missionaries stationed in the Harput area, Major F. D. Yowell and Dr. Mark Ward. After they were expelled by the Turkish authorities in March 1922, they presented their findings to Jackson and Bristol. The British High Commission in Constantinople described the two missionaries' reports as highlighting "deliberate attempt of the Angora Government to exterminate the Greek population of Anatolia". Yowell and Ward described, among other things, the severe restrictions the authorities imposed on NER operations. Before the Kemalists took over, the Harput authorities had been "friendly" and had assisted NER. But "since the Nationalists have been in control ... the local politicians who took part in the deportations and massacres of Armenians in 1915 and 1916 have gradually returned to power", Ward wrote. He noted that many of the better-educated Muslims, including Muslim clerics, opposed the government's treatment of NER.

Yowell and Ward reported that, of 30,000 Greek deportees who had passed through Sivas in early summer 1921, 5,000 had died before reaching Harput and another 5,000 had escaped the convoys. Of the 20,000 who reached Harput, 2,000 died there and 3,000 were scattered around the vilayet. The remaining 15,000 trudged on to Diyarbekir. Of these, 3,000 died on the way, 1,000 died in Diyarbekir, 2,000 remained in Diyarbekir, and the remaining 9,000 were sent toward Bitlis. What had happened to them was unknown. But "the deportees all know that they were being sent there to die. The Turkish officials all know it", the missionaries reported. "The Turkish authorities were frank in their statements that it was the intention to have all the Greeks die and all of their action – their failure to supply any food or clothing – their strong opposition to relief by N.E.R – their choice of routs [sic], weather, etc. – concentrations in unhealthful places, and last of all their deliberate choice of destination, Bitlis, a place almost totally destroyed, with no industry and located far up in the mountains, seem to fully bear this statement out".

== Population exchange ==
On 30 January 1923 the population exchange between Greece and Turkey was agreed in Lausanne. According to it, Sunni Muslims in Greece and Orthodox Greeks in Asia Minor would be exchanged with the exception for Western Thrace and Constantinople.

Regarding Anatolian Greeks, the exchange was quite formal, because at the time of its signing, most of them were killed or fled (among 1.2 million "exchanged" only 190,000 were transferred according to the treaty).

For Nationalists, the benefit of the treaty was that it allowed them to legally get rid of the remaining Greeks and ensured that none of those who had already fled would ever return. In Pontus, the Treaty of Lausanne only legally cemented the results of the genocide. Greek villages were destroyed and churches were desecrated, most inhabitants either died or fled to Georgia or Russia. Only small groups of Greek guerrillas wandered with their families and other civilians in the forests of Pontus.

Having learned about the agreement, many surviving Pontians continued to distrust the Turks. Sometimes even the arrival of international missions could not convince them to leave the forests. Risking their lives, they made attempts to move to the Soviet Union by sea on all kinds of watercraft. A typical case is that of commander Pantelis Anastasiadis, who with his 25 soldiers and 300 civilians was able to reach Poti on two motor schooners, at the end of December 1923. Another schooner with 150 Pontians, 25 of them women, managed to arrive in Yalta.

Agtzidis writes that even a year after the Lausanne Treaty there were still Greek partisans in the Pontic Mountains. Only those who reached Soviet territory survived.

Almost 190,000 Greeks were sent from the Ottoman Empire to Greece and about 350,000 Muslims were brought from Greece to the Ottoman Empire. With that, no more Christian Greeks were left in the Ottoman Empire.

== Differences from the Greek genocide in other regions ==
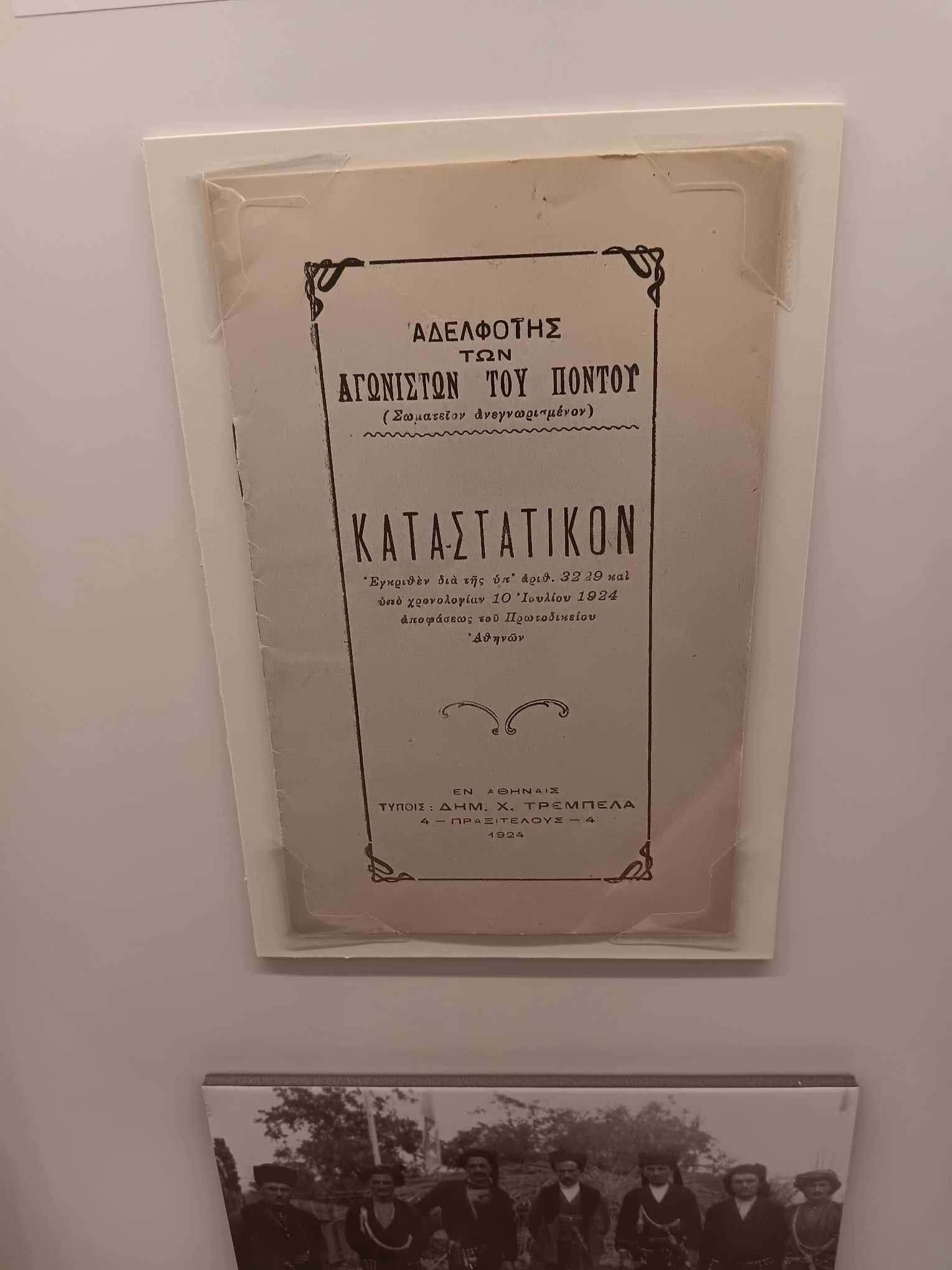
1924 statute of the Athens-based Brotherhood of the Fighters for Pontus

The Ottoman Turks did not differentiate between Greek communities, and considered them all as being members of the Ottoman Rum millet.

The first difference is armed resistance. Pontic Greeks responded to persecutions by creating self-defense groups, which fought Turkish irregulars and army and protected civilians. They saved an estimated 60,000 lives. There was almost no resistance in Western Anatolia on such level.

The second difference is that many Pontic Greeks fled to Russia or Georgia, which were much closer and easier to reach. In comparison, almost all Greeks in Western Anatolia, who were not killed, fled to Greece.

A third difference is that the Greek army did not land in Pontus and never even planned to do it. Therefore, if massacres in Western Anatolia can be connected to the Greco-Turkish War, the genocide in Pontus, which was hundreds of kilometres away, cannot be justified by this.

Another difference is that unlike the Greek genocide as a whole, the Pontic genocide has its own date of commemoration (May 19) that only applies to Pontus.

== Recognition ==
Excluding revanchist slogans of fringe far-right organizations, the activities of Pontic refugee communities are aimed at Turkey's recognition of the genocide of Pontic and Anatolian Greeks.

On December 16, 2007, the Pontic Greek genocide was officially recognized by the International Association of Genocide Scholars. On 24 February 1994, the Greek parliament officially recognized the genocide and declared 19 May as the national day of remembrance. Turkey has not made a statement about the genocide.

The genocide was recognized by Sweden in 2010 and the Netherlands and Armenia in 2015.

== Memorials ==
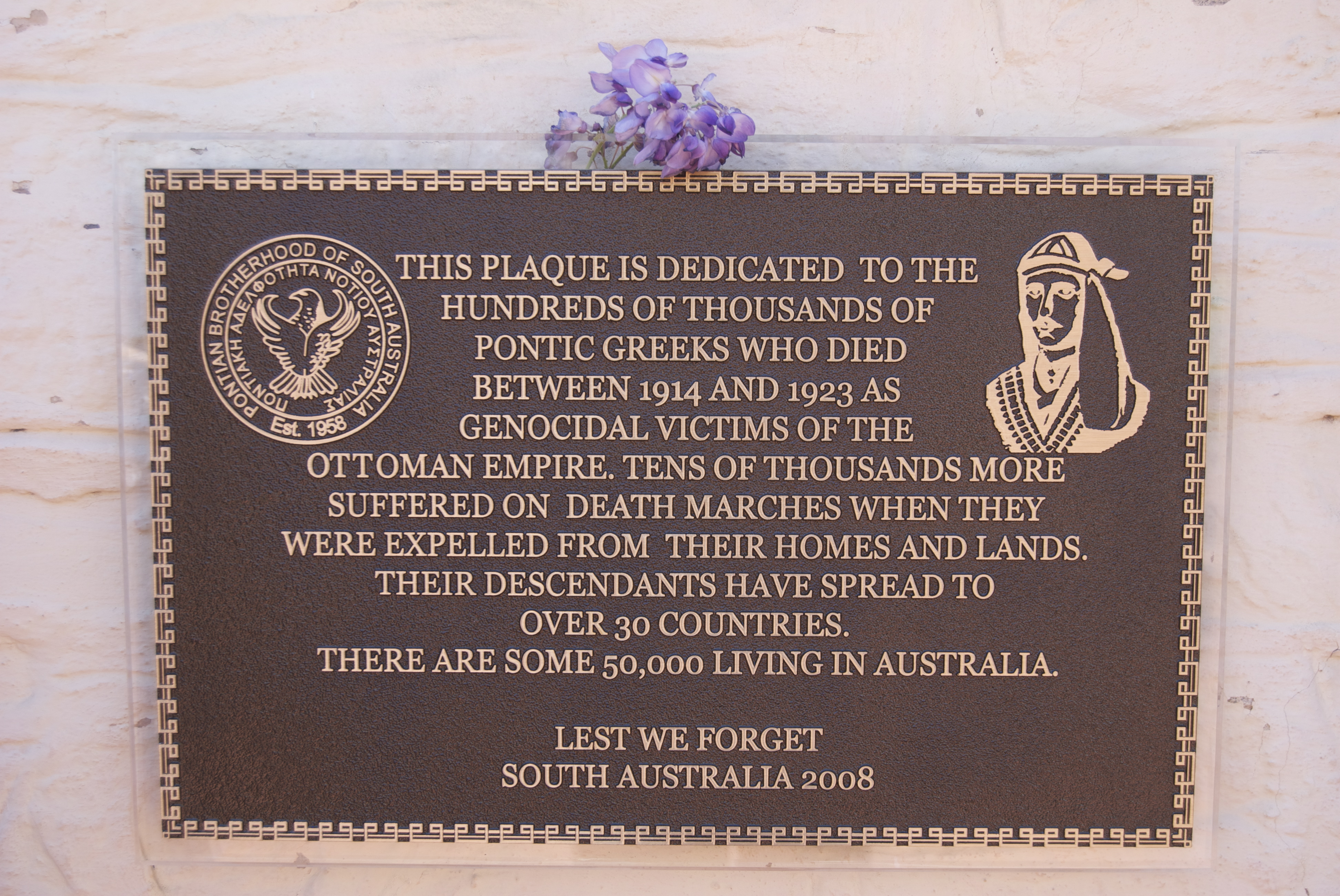
Pontian memorial plaque in Adelaide, Australia

Many descendants of the Pontic genocide ended up in Australia. There is a memorial plaque, unveiled in 2008, to the approximately 50,000 descendants of survivors of the genocide who migrated to Australia, at the Migration Museum in Adelaide, Australia.

== See also ==
- Constantinople pogroms
- Cyprus conflict
- Burning of Izmir
- Greece-Turkey population exchange
- List of massacres in Turkey
- List of massacres in Cyprus
- Persecution of Christians
- Persecution of Eastern Orthodox Christians
- Religious violence
- Greek Genocide Resource Center
