= Greek genocide =

Genocide campaign in the Ottoman Empire

- Part of World War I, the aftermath of World War I and the late Ottoman genocides
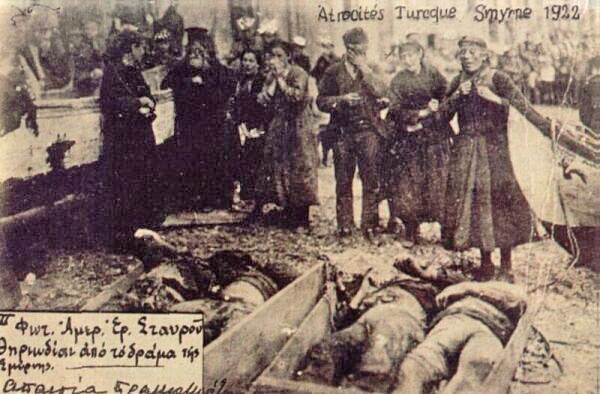
- Greek civilians mourn their dead relatives, Great Fire of Smyrna, 1922
- Location: Ottoman Empire (mainly present-day Turkey)
- Date: 1912/1913–1923
- Target: Greek population, particularly from Pontus, Cappadocia, Ionia and Eastern Thrace
- Attack type: Deportation, genocide, ethnic cleansing, death marches
- Deaths: 300,000–1,200,000 (see § Casualties)
- Perpetrators: Ottoman Empire, Turkish National Movement
- Trials: Ottoman Special Military Tribunal
- Motive: Anti-Greek sentiment, Turkification, Anti-Eastern Orthodox sentiment

Greek genocide

Background
- Young Turk Revolution, Ottoman Greeks, Pontic Greeks, Ottoman Empire

The genocide
- Labour battalions, Death march, Pontic Greek genocide, Phocaea massacre, Evacuation of Ayvalik, İzmit massacres, 1914 Greek deportations, Tekâlif-i Milliye, Samsun deportations, Amasya trials, Burning of Smyrna

Resistance and rescue
- Greek resistance during the Greek genocide, Seventh Battle of Dazli, Anton Pasha, Kotza Anastas, Efkleidis Kourtidis, Habil Bey

Foreign aid and relief
- Relief Committee for Greeks of Asia Minor, American Committee for Relief in the Near East, Asa Jennings, Esther Pohl Lovejoy, Pope Benedict XV, Pope Pius XI, Tokei Maru

Responsible parties
- Young Turks or Committee of Union and Progress; Three Pashas: Talat, Enver, Djemal; Bahaeddin Şakir, Teskilati Mahsusa or Special Organization, Nureddin Pasha, Topal Osman, Mustafa Kemal Atatürk

See also
- Greco-Turkish War (1919–1922), Greeks in Turkey, Population Exchange, Greek refugees, Armenian genocide, Assyrian genocide, Diyarbekir genocide, Istanbul trials of 1919–1920, Malta Tribunals

The Greek genocide (Note: Also known as ethnic cleansing of Ottoman Greeks.) (Greek: Γενοκτονία των Ελλήνων, romanized: Genoktonía ton Ellínon), which included the Pontic genocide, was the systematic killing of the indigenous Christian Ottoman Greek population of Anatolia because of their religion and ethnicity, which was carried out between 1912 and 1923. This period extended across the Balkan Wars (1912–1913), World War I and its aftermath (1914–1919), and the Turkish War of Independence (1919–1923). The genocide was perpetrated by the government of the Ottoman Empire led by the Three Pashas and by the Government of the Grand National Assembly led by Mustafa Kemal Atatürk.

The genocide included massacres, forced deportations involving death marches through the Syrian Desert, expulsions, summary executions, and the destruction of Eastern Orthodox cultural, historical, and religious monuments. Several hundred thousand Ottoman Greeks died during this period. Most of the refugees and survivors fled to Greece (adding over a quarter to the prior population of Greece). Some, especially those in Eastern provinces, took refuge in the neighbouring Russian Empire. Some who remained organized the resistance to the genocide.

By late 1922, most of the Greeks of Asia Minor had either fled or had been killed. Those remaining were transferred to Greece under the terms of the later 1923 population exchange between Greece and Turkey, which formalized the exodus and barred the return of the refugees. Other ethnic groups were similarly attacked by the Ottoman Empire during this period, including Assyrians and Armenians, and some scholars and organizations have recognized these events as part of the same genocidal policy.

The Allies of World War I condemned the Ottoman government–sponsored massacres. In 2007, the International Association of Genocide Scholars passed a resolution recognising the Ottoman campaign against its Christian minorities, including the Greeks, as genocide. Some other organisations have also passed resolutions recognising the Ottoman campaign against these Christian minorities as genocide, as have the national legislatures of Armenia, Austria, Cyprus, the Czech Republic, Germany, Greece, the Netherlands, Sweden, and the United States.

== Background ==
At the outbreak of World War I, Asia Minor was ethnically diverse; its population included Turks and Azeris, as well as groups that had inhabited the region prior to the Ottoman conquest, including Pontic Greeks, Caucasus Greeks, Cappadocian Greeks, Armenians, Kurds, Zazas, Georgians, Circassians, Assyrians, Jews, and Laz people.

Among the causes of the Turkish campaign against the Greek-speaking Christian population was a fear that they would welcome liberation by the Ottoman Empire's enemies, and a belief among some Turks that to form a modern country in the era of nationalism it was necessary to purge from their territories all minorities who could threaten the integrity of an ethnically based Turkish nation.

According to a German military attaché, the Ottoman minister of war Ismail Enver had declared in October 1915 that he wanted to "solve the Greek problem during the war … in the same way he believe[d] he solved the Armenian problem", referring to the Armenian genocide. Germany and the Ottoman Empire were allies immediately before, and during World War I. By 31 January 1917, the Chancellor of Germany Theobald von Bethmann Hollweg, reported that:

The indications are that the Turks plan to eliminate the Greek element as enemies of the state, as they did earlier with the Armenians. The strategy implemented by the Turks is of displacing people to the interior without taking measures for their survival by exposing them to death, hunger, and illness. The abandoned homes are then looted and burnt or destroyed. Whatever was done to the Armenians is being repeated with the Greeks.

— Chancellor of Germany in 1917, Theobald von Bethmann Hollweg, The Killing Trap: Genocide in the Twentieth Century

== Origin of the Greek minority ==
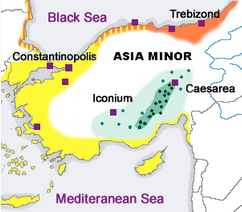
Areas with Anatolian Greeks in 1910. Demotic Greek speakers in yellow. Pontic Greek in orange. Cappadocian Greek in green with individual towns indicated. Shaded regions do not indicate that Greek-speakers were a majority.

The Greek presence in Asia Minor dates at least from the Late Bronze Age (1450 BC). The Greek poet Homer lived in the region around 800 BC. The geographer Strabo referred to Smyrna as the first Greek city in Asia Minor, and numerous ancient Greek figures were natives of Anatolia, including the mathematician Thales of Miletus (7th century BC), the pre-Socratic philosopher Heraclitus of Ephesus (6th century BC), and the founder of Cynicism Diogenes of Sinope (4th century BC). Greeks referred to the Black Sea as the "Euxinos Pontos" or "hospitable sea" and starting in the eighth century BC they began navigating its shores and settling along its Anatolian coast. The most notable Greek cities of the Black Sea were Trebizond, Sampsounta, Sinope and Heraclea Pontica.

During the Hellenistic period (334 BC – 1st century BC), which followed the conquests of Alexander the Great, Greek culture and language began to dominate even the interior of Asia Minor. The Hellenization of the region accelerated under Roman and early Byzantine rule, and by the early centuries AD the local Indo-European Anatolian languages had become extinct, being replaced by the Koine Greek language. From this point until the late Middle Ages, the majority of Asia Minor practiced Christianity (called Greek Orthodox Christianity after the East–West Schism with the Catholics in 1054) and spoke Medieval Greek as their first language.

The resultant Greek culture in Asia Minor flourished during a millennium of rule (4th–15th century AD) under the mainly Greek-speaking Eastern Roman Empire. Those from Asia Minor constituted the bulk of the empire's Greek-speaking Orthodox Christians; thus, many renowned Greek figures during late antiquity, the Middle Ages, and the Renaissance came from Asia Minor, including Saint Nicholas (270–343 AD), rhetorician John Chrysostomos (349–407 AD), the architect of Hagia Sophia, Isidore of Miletus (6th century AD), several imperial dynasties, including the Phokas (10th century) and Komnenos (11th century), and Renaissance scholars George of Trebizond (1395–1472) and Basilios Bessarion (1403–1472).

Thus, when the Turkic peoples began their late medieval conquest of Asia Minor, Byzantine Greek citizens were the largest group of inhabitants there. Even after the Turkic conquests of the interior, the mountainous Black Sea coast of Asia Minor remained the heart of a populous Greek Christian state, the Empire of Trebizond, until its eventual conquest by the Ottoman Turks in 1461, a year after the Ottomans conquered the area of Europe which is now the Greek mainland. Over the next four centuries the Greek natives of Asia Minor gradually became a minority in these lands under the now dominant Turkic culture.

== Events ==
=== Balkan Wars to World War I ===
Total population figures for the Ottoman Greeks of Anatolia
	Greek census (1910–1912)	Ottoman census (1914)	Soteriades (1918)
Hüdavendigâr (Prousa)	262,319	184,424	278,421
Konya (Ikonio)	74,539	65,054	66,895
Trabzon (Trebizond)	298,183	260,313	353,533
Ankara (Angora)	85,242	77,530	66,194
Aydin	495,936	319,079	622,810
Kastamonu	24,349	26,104	24,937
Sivas	74,632	75,324	99,376
İzmit (Nicomedia)	52,742	40,048	73,134
Biga (Dardanelles)	31,165	8,541	32,830
Total	1,399,107	1,056,357	1,618,130

Beginning in the spring of 1913, the Ottomans implemented a programme of expulsions and forcible migrations, focusing on Greeks of the Aegean region and eastern Thrace, whose presence in these areas was deemed a threat to national security. The Ottoman government adopted a "dual-track mechanism", whereby official government acts were accompanied by unofficial covert, extralegal, but state-sponsored acts of terror under the protective umbrella of state policies, thereby allowing the Ottoman government to deny responsibility for and prior knowledge of this campaign of intimidation, emptying Christian villages. The involvement in certain cases of local military and civil functionaries in planning and executing anti-Greek violence and looting led ambassadors of Greece and the Great Powers and the Patriarchate to address complaints to the Sublime Porte. In protest to government inaction in the face of these attacks and to the so-called "Muslim boycott" of Greek products that had begun in 1913, the Patriarchate closed Greek churches and schools in June 1914. Responding to international and domestic pressure, Talat Pasha headed a visit in Thrace in April 1914 and later in the Aegean to investigate reports and try to soothe bilateral tension with Greece. While claiming that he had no involvement or knowledge of these events, Talat met with Kuşçubaşı Eşref, head of the "cleansing" operation in the Aegean littoral, during his tour and advised him to be cautious not to be "visible". Also, after 1913 there were organized boycotts against the Greeks, initiated by the Ottoman Interior Ministry who asked the empire's provinces to start them. The British ambassador in Constantinople at that time described the boycott as a direct result of the Committee of Union and Progress and that "Committee emissaries are everywhere instigating the people", adding that every person, Greek or Muslim, who entered a non-Muslim shop was beaten.

One of the worst attacks of this campaign took place in Phocaea (Greek: Φώκαια), on the night of 12 June 1914, a town in western Anatolia next to Smyrna, where Turkish irregular troops destroyed the city, killing 50 or 100 civilians and causing its population to flee to Greece. French eyewitness Charles Manciet states that the atrocities he had witnessed at Phocaea were of an organized nature that aimed at circling Christian peasant populations of the region. In another attack against Serenkieuy, in Menemen district, the villagers formed armed resistance groups but only a few managed to survive being outnumbered by the attacking Muslim irregular bands. During the summer of the same year the Special Organization (Teşkilat-ı Mahsusa), assisted by government and army officials, conscripted Greek men of military age from Thrace and western Anatolia into Labour Battalions in which hundreds of thousands died. These conscripts, after being sent hundreds of miles into the interior of Anatolia, were employed in road-making, building, tunnel excavating and other field work; but their numbers were heavily reduced through privations and ill-treatment and through outright massacre by their Ottoman guards.

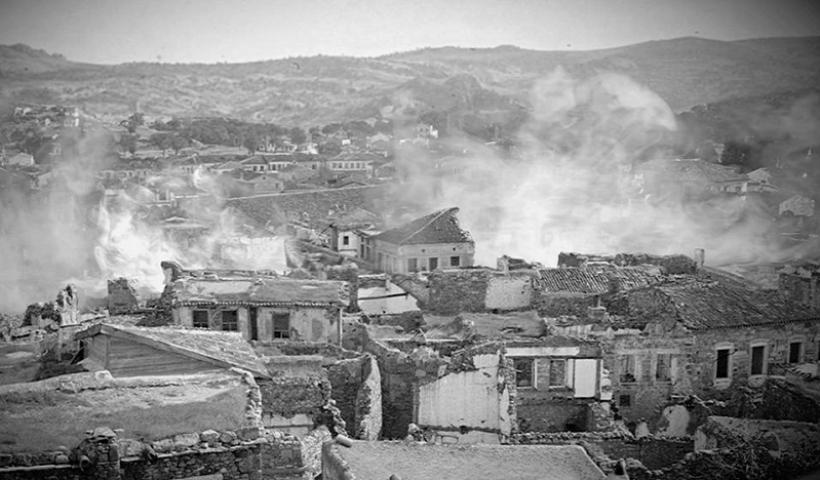
Phocaea in flames, during the massacre perpetrated by Turkish irregulars in June 1914

Following similar accords made with Bulgaria and Serbia, the Ottoman Empire signed a small voluntary population exchange agreement with Greece on 14 November 1913. Another such agreement was signed 1 July 1914 for the exchange of some "Turks" (that is, Muslims) of Greece for some Greeks of Aydin and Western Thrace, after the Ottomans had forced these Greeks from their homes in response to the Greek annexation of several islands. The swap was never completed due to the eruption of World War I. While discussions for population exchanges were still conducted, Special Organization units attacked Greek villages forcing their inhabitants to abandon their homes for Greece, being replaced with Muslim refugees.

The forceful expulsion of Christians of western Anatolia, especially Ottoman Greeks, has many similarities with policy towards the Armenians, as observed by US ambassador Henry Morgenthau and historian Arnold Toynbee. In both cases, certain Ottoman officials, such as Şükrü Kaya, Nazım Bey and Mehmed Reshid, played a role; Special Organization units and labour battalions were involved; and a dual plan was implemented combining unofficial violence and the cover of state population policy. This policy of persecution and ethnic cleansing was expanded to other parts of the Ottoman Empire, including Greek communities in Pontus, Cappadocia, and Cilicia.

=== World War I ===
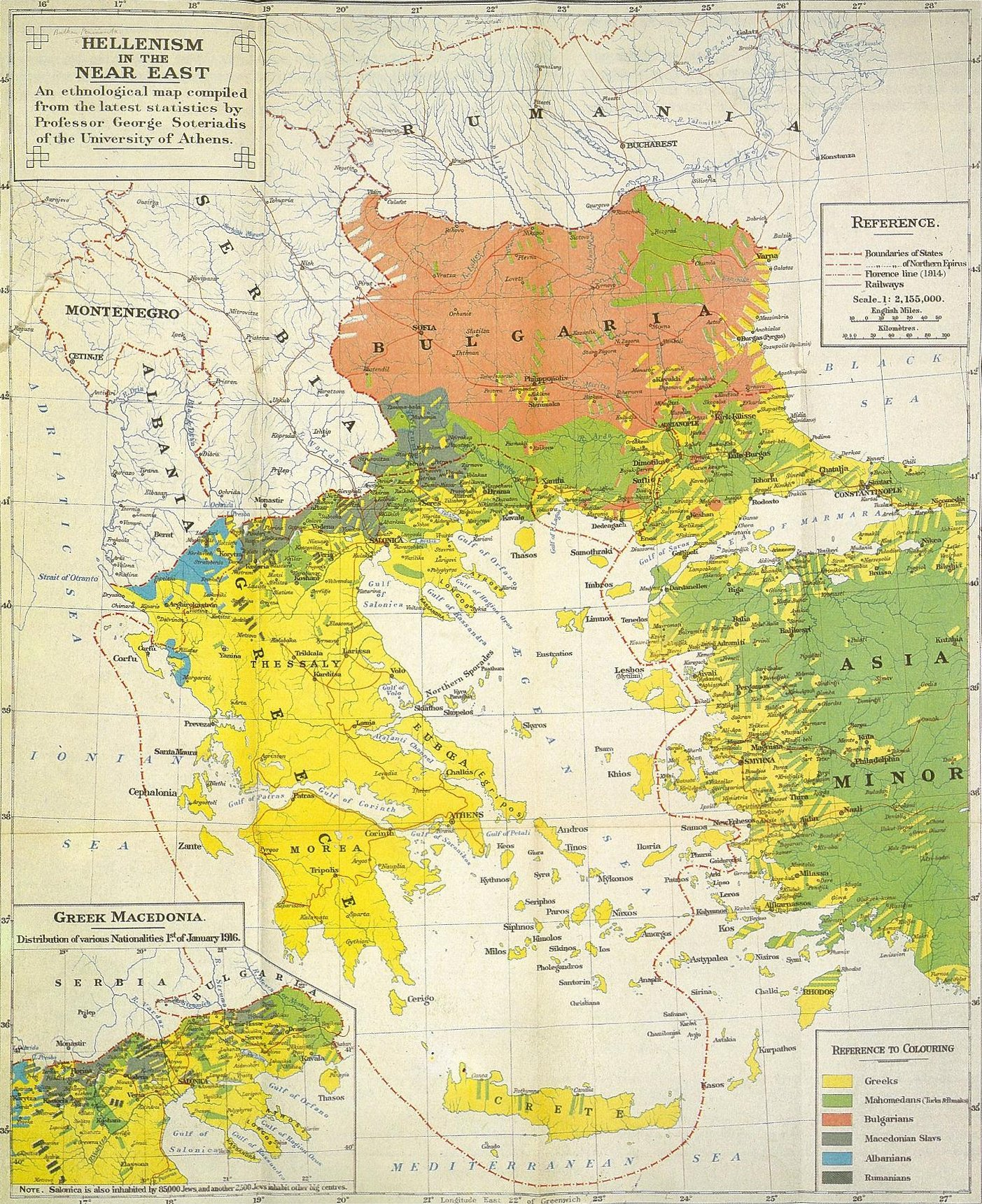
Hellenism in Near East during and after World War I, showing some of the areas (Western Anatolia and Eastern Thrace) where the Greek population was concentrated. The Pontic region is not shown.

According to a newspaper of the time, in November 1914, Turkish troops destroyed Christian properties and murdered several Christians at Trabzon. After November 1914 Ottoman policy towards the Greek population shifted; state policy was restricted to the forceful migration to the Anatolian hinterland of Greeks living in coastal areas, particularly the Black Sea region, close to the Turkish-Russian front. This change of policy was due to a German demand for the persecution of Ottoman Greeks to stop, after Eleftherios Venizelos had made this a condition of Greece's neutrality when speaking to the German ambassador in Athens. Venizelos also threatened to undertake a similar campaign against Muslims that were living in Greece if Ottoman policy did not change. While the Ottoman government tried to implement this change in policy, it was unsuccessful and attacks, even murders, continued to occur unpunished by local officials in the provinces, despite repeated instructions in cables sent from the central administration. Arbitrary violence and extortion of money intensified later, providing ammunition for the Venizelists arguing that Greece should join the Entente.

In July 1915 the Greek chargé d'affaires claimed that the deportations "can not be any other issue than an annihilation war against the Greek nation in Turkey and as measures hereof they have been implementing forced conversions to Islam, in [an] obvious aim to, that if after the end of the war there again would be a question of European intervention for the protection of the Christians, there will be as few of them left as possible." According to George W. Rendel of the British Foreign Office, by 1918 "over 500,000 Greeks were deported of whom comparatively few survived". In his memoirs, the United States ambassador to the Ottoman Empire between 1913 and 1916 wrote "Everywhere the Greeks were gathered in groups and, under the so-called protection of Turkish gendarmes, they were transported, the larger part on foot, into the interior. Just how many were scattered in this fashion is not definitely known, the estimates varying anywhere from 200,000 up to 1,000,000."

Despite the shift of policy, the practice of evacuating Greek settlements and relocating the inhabitants was continued, albeit on a limited scale. Relocation was targeted at specific regions that were considered militarily vulnerable, not the whole of the Greek population. As a 1919 Patriarchate account records, the evacuation of many villages was accompanied with looting and murders, while many died as a result of not having been given the time to make the necessary provisions or of being relocated to uninhabitable places.

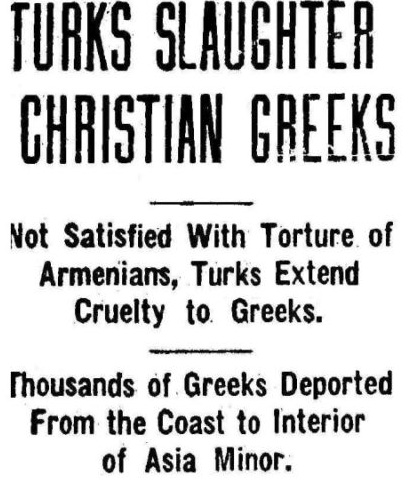
"Turks Slaughter Christian Greeks", Lincoln Daily Star, 19 October 1917

State policy towards Ottoman Greeks changed again in the fall of 1916. With Entente forces occupying Lesbos, Chios and Samos since spring, the Russians advancing in Anatolia and Greece expected to enter the war siding with the Allies, preparations were made for the deportation of Greeks living in border areas. In January 1917 Talat Pasha sent a cable for the deportation of Greeks from the Samsun district "thirty to fifty kilometres inland" taking care for "no assaults on any persons or property". However, the execution of government decrees, which took a systematic form from December 1916, when Behaeddin Shakir came to the region, was not conducted as ordered: men were taken in labour battalions, women and children were attacked, villages were looted by Muslim neighbours. As such in March 1917 the population of Ayvalık, a town of c. 30,000 inhabitants on the Aegean coast was forcibly deported to the interior of Anatolia under order by German General Liman von Sanders. The operation included death marches, looting, torture and massacre against the civilian population. Germanos Karavangelis, the bishop of Samsun, reported to the Patriarchate that thirty thousands had been deported to the Ankara region and the convoys of the deportees had been attacked, with many being killed. Talat Pasha ordered an investigation for the looting and destruction of Greek villages by bandits. Later in 1917 instructions were sent to authorize military officials with the control of the operation and to broaden its scope, now including persons from cities in the coastal region. However, in certain areas Greek populations remained undeported.

Greek deportees were sent to live in Greek villages in the inner provinces or, in some case, villages where Armenians were living before being deported. Greek villages evacuated during the war due to military concerns were then resettled with Muslim immigrants and refugees. According to cables sent to the provinces during this time, abandoned movable and non-movable Greek property was not to be liquidated, as that of the Armenians, but "preserved".

On 14 January 1917 Cossva Anckarsvärd, Sweden's Ambassador to Constantinople, sent a dispatch regarding the decision to deport the Ottoman Greeks:

What above all appears as an unnecessary cruelty is that the deportation is not limited to the men alone, but is extended likewise to women and children. This is supposedly done in order to much easier be able to confiscate the property of the deported.

According to Rendel, atrocities such as deportations involving death marches, starvation in labour camps etc. were referred to as "white massacres". Ottoman official Rafet Bey was active in the genocide of the Greeks and in November 1916, Austrian consul in Samsun, Kwiatkowski, reported that he said to him "We must finish off the Greeks as we did with the Armenians ... today I sent squads to the interior to kill every Greek on sight".

Pontic Greeks responded by forming insurgent groups, which carried weapons salvaged from the battlefields of the Caucasus Campaign of World War I or directly supplied by the Russian army. In 1920, the insurgents reached their peak in regard to manpower numbering 18,000 men. On 15 November 1917, Ozakom delegates agreed to create a unified army composed of ethnically homogeneous units, Greeks were allotted a division consisting of three regiments. The Greek Caucasus Division was thus formed out of ethnic Greeks serving in Russian units stationed in the Caucasus and raw recruits from among the local population including former insurgents. The division took part in numerous engagements against the Ottoman army as well as Muslim and Armenian irregulars, safeguarding the withdrawal of Greek refugees into the Russian held Caucasus, before being disbanded in the aftermath of the Treaty of Poti.

=== Greco-Turkish War ===
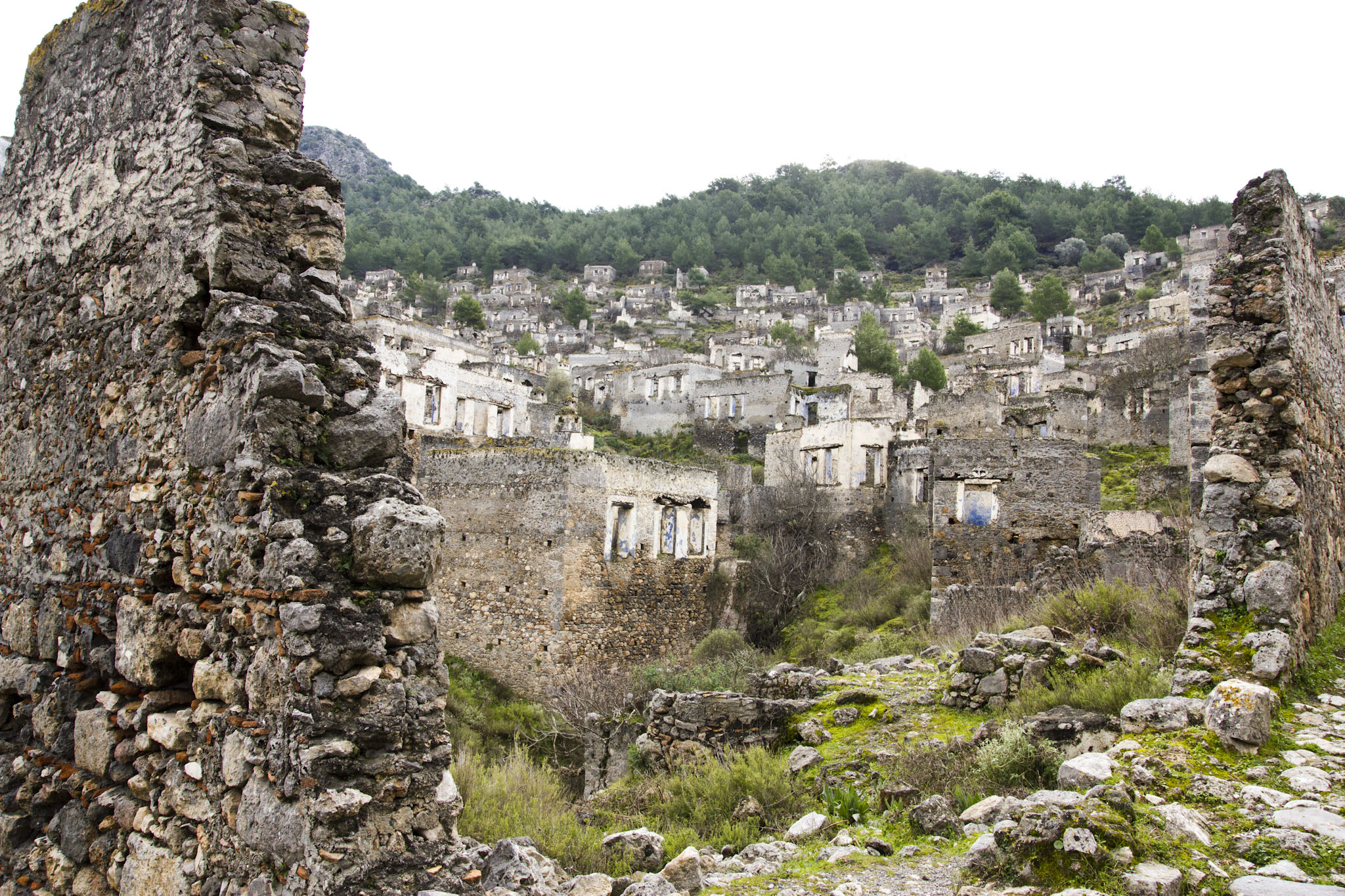
Ghost town of Kayakoy (Livisi), southwestern Anatolia, once a Greek-inhabited settlement. According to local tradition, Muslims refused to repopulate the place because "it was infested with the ghosts of Livisians massacred in 1915".

After the Ottoman Empire capitulated on 30 October 1918, it came under the de jure control of the victorious Entente Powers. However, the latter failed to bring the perpetrators of the genocide to justice, although in the Turkish Courts-Martial of 1919–20 a number of leading Ottoman officials were accused of ordering massacres against both Greeks and Armenians. Thus, killings, massacres and deportations continued under the pretext of the national movement of Mustafa Kemal (later Atatürk).

In an October 1920 report a British officer describes the aftermath of the massacres at İznik in north-western Anatolia in which he estimated that at least 100 decomposed mutilated bodies of men, women and children were present in and around a large cave about 300 yards outside the city walls.

The systematic massacre and deportation of Greeks in Asia Minor, a program which had come into effect in 1914, was a precursor to the atrocities perpetrated by both the Greek and Turkish armies during the Greco-Turkish War, a conflict which followed the Greek landing at Smyrna in May 1919 and continued until the retaking of Smyrna by the Turks and the Great Fire of Smyrna in September 1922. Rudolph Rummel estimated the death toll of the fire at 100,000 Greeks and Armenians, who perished in the fire and accompanying massacres. According to Norman M. Naimark "more realistic estimates range between 10,000 to 15,000" for the casualties of the Great Fire of Smyrna. Some 150,000 to 200,000 Greeks were expelled after the fire, while about 30,000 able-bodied Greek and Armenian men were deported to the interior of Asia Minor, most of whom were executed on the way or died under brutal conditions. George W. Rendel of the British Foreign Office noted the massacres and deportations of Greeks during the Greco-Turkish War. According to estimates by Rudolph Rummel, between 213,000 and 368,000 Anatolian Greeks were killed between 1919 and 1922. There were also massacres of Turks carried out by the Hellenic troops during the occupation of western Anatolia from May 1919 to September 1922.

For the massacres that occurred during the Greco-Turkish War of 1919–1922, British historian Arnold J. Toynbee wrote that it was the Greek landings that created the Turkish National Movement led by Mustafa Kemal: "The Greeks of 'Pontus' and the Turks of the Greek occupied territories, were in some degree victims of Mr. Venizelos's and Mr. Lloyd George's original miscalculations at Paris."

=== Relief efforts ===
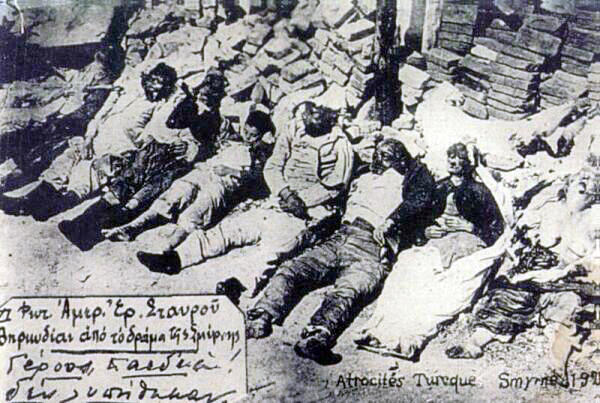
Photo taken after the Smyrna fire. The text inside indicates that the photo had been taken by representatives of the Red Cross in Smyrna. Translation: "Elderly and children were not spared".

In 1917 a relief organization by the name of the Relief Committee for Greeks of Asia Minor was formed in response to the deportations and massacres of Greeks in the Ottoman Empire. The committee worked in cooperation with the Near East Relief in distributing aid to Ottoman Greeks in Thrace and Asia Minor. The organisation disbanded in the summer of 1921 but Greek relief work was continued by other aid organisations.

=== Contemporary accounts ===
German and Austro-Hungarian diplomats, as well as the 1922 memorandum compiled by British diplomat George W. Rendel on "Turkish Massacres and Persecutions", provided evidence for series of systematic massacres and ethnic cleansing of the Greeks in Asia Minor. The quotes have been attributed to various diplomats, including the German ambassadors Hans Freiherr von Wangenheim and Richard von Kühlmann, the German vice-consul in Samsun Kuchhoff, Austria's ambassador Pallavicini and Samsun consul Ernst von Kwiatkowski, and the Italian unofficial agent in Angora Signor Tuozzi. Other quotes are from clergymen and activists, including the German missionary Johannes Lepsius, and Stanley Hopkins of the Near East Relief.

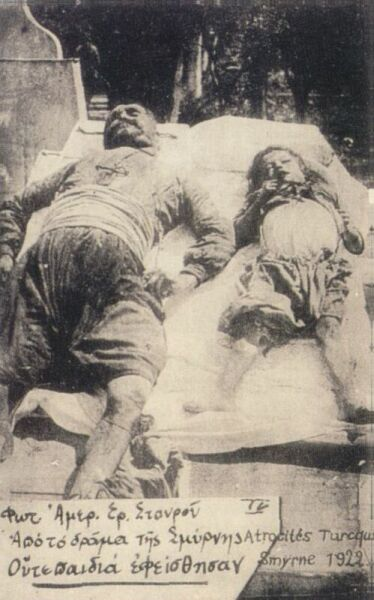
Smyrna, 1922. Translation: "No children were allowed to live".

The accounts describe systematic massacres, rapes and burnings of Greek villages, and attribute intent to Ottoman officials, including the Ottoman Prime Minister Mahmud Sevket Pasha, Rafet Bey, Talat Pasha and Enver Pasha.

Additionally, The New York Times and its correspondents made extensive references to the events, recording massacres, deportations, individual killings, rapes, burning of entire Greek villages, destruction of Greek Orthodox churches and monasteries, drafts for "Labor Brigades", looting, terrorism and other "atrocities" for Greek, Armenian and also for British and American citizens and government officials. Australian press also had some coverage of the events.

Henry Morgenthau, the United States ambassador to the Ottoman Empire from 1913 to 1916, accused the "Turkish government" of a campaign of "outrageous terrorizing, cruel torturing, driving of women into harems, debauchery of innocent girls, the sale of many of them at 80 cents each, the murdering of hundreds of thousands and the deportation to and starvation in the desert of other hundreds of thousands, [and] the destruction of hundreds of villages and many cities", all part of "the willful execution" of a "scheme to annihilate the Armenian, Greek and Syrian Christians of Turkey". However, months prior to the First World War, 100,000 Greeks were deported to Greek islands or the interior which Morgenthau stated, "for the larger part these were bona-fide deportations; that is, the Greek inhabitants were actually removed to new places and were not subjected to wholesale massacre. It was probably the reason that the civilized world did not protest against these deportations".

US Consul-General George Horton, whose account has been criticised by scholars as anti-Turkish, claimed, "One of the cleverest statements circulated by the Turkish propagandists is to the effect that the massacred Christians were as bad as their executioners, that it was '50–50'." On this issue he comments: "Had the Greeks, after the massacres in the Pontus and at Smyrna, massacred all the Turks in Greece, the record would have been 50–50—almost." As an eye-witness, he also praises Greeks for their "conduct ... toward the thousands of Turks residing in Greece, while the ferocious massacres were going on", which, according to his opinion, was "one of the most inspiring and beautiful chapters in all that country's history".

Even the US admiral Arthur L. Bristol, who advised foreign journalists to avoid publishing about the persecution of the Greeks, in his conversations and letters stated the harsh conditions for Armenians and Greeks. He even tried to stop the deportation of the Greeks from Samsun.

=== Casualties ===
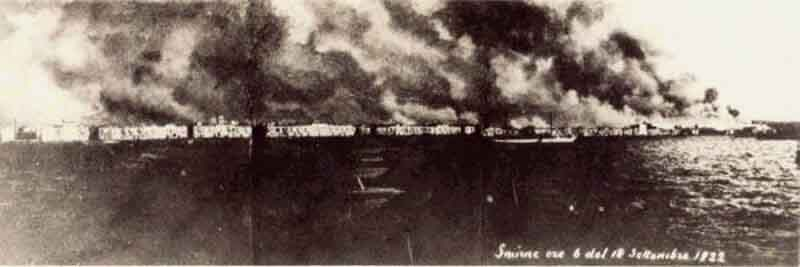
Smyrna burning during the Fire of Smyrna. According to different estimates some 10,000 to 100,000 Greeks and Armenians were killed in the fire and accompanying massacres.

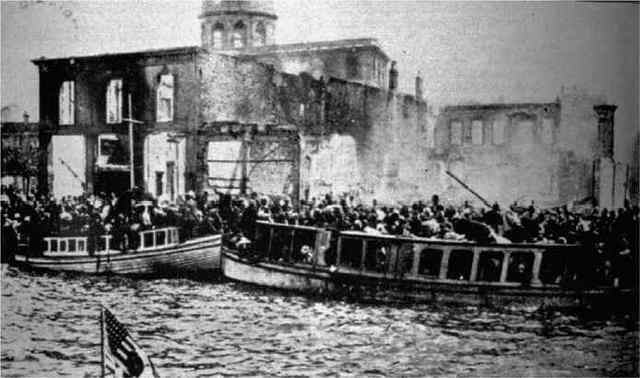
Smyrna citizens trying to reach the Allied ships during the Smyrna fire, 1922. The photo was taken from the launch boat of a US battleship.

According to Benny Morris and Dror Ze'evi in The Thirty-Year Genocide, as a result of Ottoman and Turkish state policy, "several hundred thousand Ottoman Greeks had died. Either they were murdered outright or were the intentional victims of hunger, disease, and exposure."

For the whole of the period between 1914 and 1922 and for the whole of Anatolia, there are academic estimates of death toll ranging from 289,000 to 750,000. The figure of 750,000 is suggested by political scientist Adam Jones. Scholar Rudolph Rummel compiled various figures from several studies to estimate lower and higher bounds for the death toll between 1914 and 1923. He estimates that 84,000 Greeks were exterminated from 1914 to 1918, and 264,000 from 1919 to 1922, a total of 347,000 for the whole period. Historian Constantine G. Hatzidimitriou writes that "loss of life among Anatolian Greeks during the WWI period and its aftermath was approximately 735,370". Similarly, when accounting for the decade of atrocities in several regions, Thea Halo estimates 1,200,000 Ottoman Greek deaths. Erik Sjöberg states that "[a]ctivists tend to inflate the overall total of Ottoman Greek deaths" over what he considers "the cautious estimates between 300,000 to 700,000". Scholar Hannibal Travis, citing Edwin Leland James, Arthur Frothingham, John Freely and Tessa Hofmann, summarized that "[e]stimates of Greek deaths rose from 360,000–750,000 in 1918 to 900,000 by 1919, and to 1.5 million by 1923". Even Armenian genocide denier and pro-Turkish author Justin McCarthy admitted that 300,000 Greeks had died, although he omitted from his count the deaths of Greeks in Thrace, Constantinople, and the Caucasus, as well as the Greeks killed after 1922.

Some contemporary sources claimed different death tolls. The Greek government collected figures together with the Patriarchate to claim that a total of one million people were massacred. A team of American researchers found in the early postwar period that the total number of Greeks killed may be close to 900,000. A League of Nations report in 1926 estimated that about half of Asia Minor's estimated 2,000,000 Greeks died during 1914–1924, i.e. 1,000,000. Edward Hale Bierstadt, writing in 1924, stated that "According to official testimony, the Turks since 1914 have slaughtered in cold blood 1,500,000 Armenians, and 500,000 Greeks, men women and children, without the slightest provocation." On 4 November 1918, Emanuel Efendi, an Ottoman deputy of Aydin, criticised the ethnic cleansing of the previous government and reported that 550,000 Greeks had been killed in the coastal regions of Anatolia (including the Black Sea coast) and Aegean Islands during the deportations.

According to various sources, the Greek death toll in the Pontus region of Anatolia alone ranges from 300,000 to 360,000. Merrill D. Peterson cites the death toll of 360,000 for the Greeks of Pontus. According to George K. Valavanis, "The loss of human life among the Pontian Greeks, since the Great War (World War I) until March 1924, can be estimated at 353,000, as a result of murders, hangings, and from punishment, disease, and other hardships." Valavanis derived this figure from the 1922 record of the Central Pontian Council in Athens based on the Black Book of the Ecumenical Patriarchate, to which he adds "50,000 new martyrs", which "came to be included in the register by spring 1924".

== Aftermath ==
Article 142 of the 1920 Treaty of Sèvres, prepared after the first World War, called the wartime Turkish regime "terrorist" and contained provisions "to repair so far as possible the wrongs inflicted on individuals in the course of the massacres perpetrated in Turkey during the war." The Treaty of Sèvres was never ratified by the Turkish government and ultimately was replaced by the Treaty of Lausanne. That treaty was accompanied by a "Declaration of Amnesty", without containing any provision in respect to punishment of war crimes.

In 1923, a population exchange between Greece and Turkey resulted in a near-complete ending of the Greek ethnic presence in Turkey and a similar ending of the Turkish ethnic presence in much of Greece. According to the Greek census of 1928, 1,104,216 Ottoman Greeks had reached Greece. It is impossible to know exactly how many Greek inhabitants of Turkey died between 1914 and 1923, and how many ethnic Greeks of Anatolia were expelled to Greece or fled to the Soviet Union. Some of the survivors and expelled took refuge in the neighboring Russian Empire (later, Soviet Union). Similar plans for a population exchange had been negotiated earlier, in 1913–1914, between Ottoman and Greek officials during the first stage of the Greek genocide but were interrupted by the onset of World War I.

In December 1924, The New York Times reported that 400 tonnes of human bones consigned to manufacturers were transported from Mudania to Marseille, which might be the remains of massacred victims in Asia Minor.

In 1955, the Istanbul Pogrom caused most of the remaining Greek inhabitants of Istanbul to flee the country. Historian Alfred-Maurice de Zayas identifies the pogrom as a crime against humanity and he states that the flight and migration of Greeks afterwards corresponds to the "intent to destroy in whole or in part" criteria of the Genocide Convention.

== Genocide recognition ==
=== Terminology ===
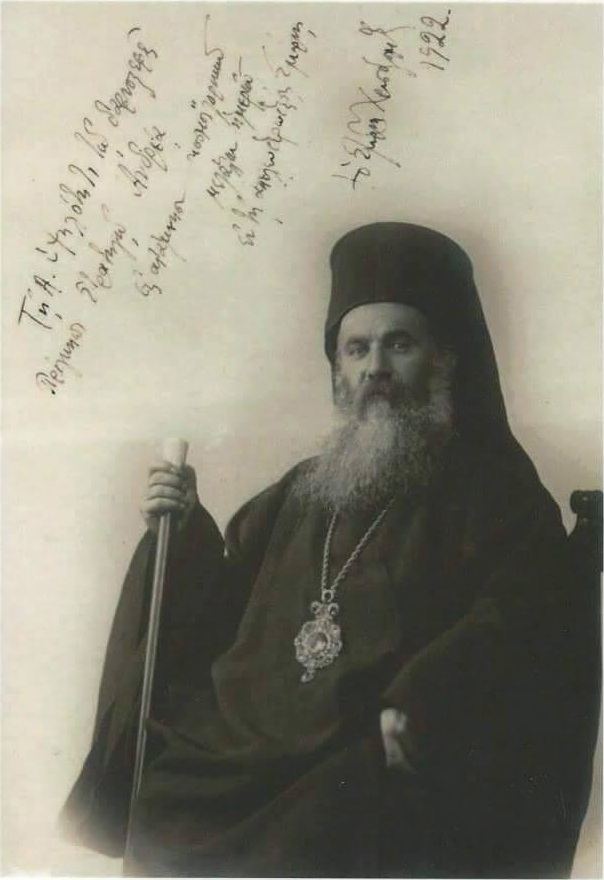
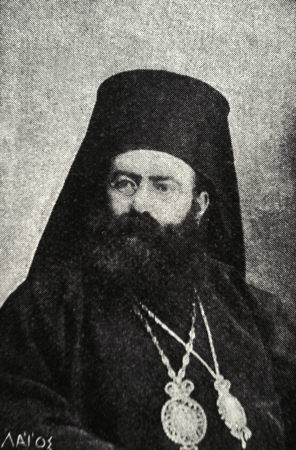
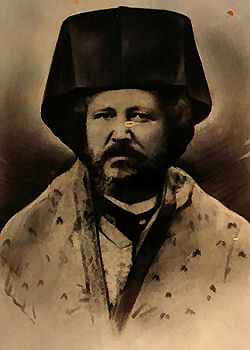
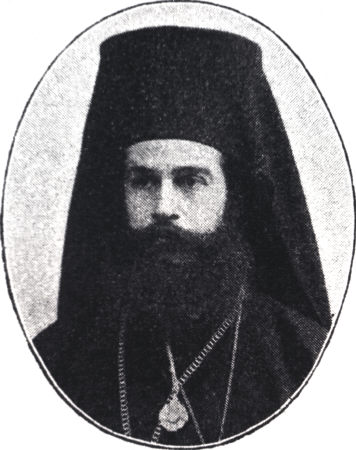
Among the victims of the atrocities committed by the Turkish nationalist Army (1922–23) were hundreds of Christian clergy in Anatolia, including metropolitan bishops (from left): Chrysostomos of Smyrna (lynched), Prokopios of Iconium (imprisoned and poisoned, not pictured), Gregory of Kydonies (executed), Euthymios of Zelon (died in prison and posthumously hanged), Ambrosios of Moschonisia (buried alive).

Before the coining of the word genocide, neologisms identical to it, such as the Scandinavian folkemord and German völkermord, were used by various European intellectuals and politicians as early as 1915 to describe the ongoing destruction of the Greeks.

The word genocide was coined in the early 1940s, the era of the Holocaust, by Raphael Lemkin, a Polish lawyer of Jewish descent. In his writings on genocide, Lemkin detailed the fate of Greeks in Turkey. Lemkin was well aware of the Greek genocide; at lectures titled "Armenian and Greek massacres by Turkey", he cited both as prime examples of state-sponsored crimes that appropriate international laws could have prevented. In August 1946, The New York Times reported:

Genocide is no new phenomenon, nor has it been utterly ignored in the past. ... The massacres of Greeks and Armenians by the Turks prompted diplomatic action without punishment. If Professor Lemkin has his way genocide will be established as an international crime ...

The 1948 Convention on the Prevention and Punishment of the Crime of Genocide (CPPCG) was adopted by the United Nations General Assembly in December 1948 and came into force in January 1951. It includes a legal definition of genocide. Before the creation of the term genocide, the destruction of the Ottoman Greeks was known by Greeks as "the Massacre" (η Σφαγή), "the Great Catastrophe" (η Μεγάλη Καταστροφή), or "the Great Tragedy" (η Μεγάλη Τραγωδία). The Ottoman and Kemalist nationalist massacres of the Greeks in Anatolia constituted genocide under the initial definition and international criminal application of the term, as in the international criminal tribunals authorized by the United Nations.

=== Academic discussion ===
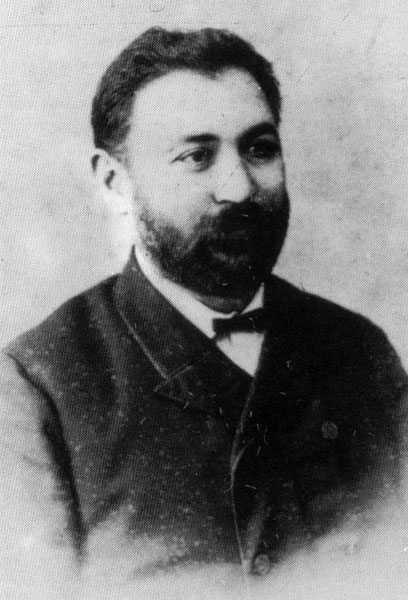
Matthaios Kofidis, former member of the Ottoman Parliament, was among the several notables of Pontus, hanged by an "Ad hoc Court of Turkish Independence" in Amasya, in 1921.

In December 2007 the International Association of Genocide Scholars (IAGS) passed a resolution affirming that the 1914–23 campaign against Ottoman Greeks constituted genocide "qualitatively similar" to the Armenian genocide. IAGS President Gregory Stanton urged the Turkish government to finally acknowledge the three genocides: "The history of these genocides is clear, and there is no more excuse for the current Turkish government, which did not itself commit the crimes, to deny the facts." Drafted by Canadian scholar Adam Jones, the resolution was adopted on 1 December 2007 with the support of 83% of all voting IAGS members. Several scholars researching the Armenian genocide, such as Peter Balakian, Taner Akçam, Richard Hovannisian and Robert Melson, however stated that "the issue had to be further researched before a resolution was passed." However, in 2010 and 2023 respectively, Hovannisian and Akçam both accepted and used the term "genocide" for the campaign against Greeks. Today, it is considered "virtually unanimous that the experiences of the indigenous peoples of Anatolia constitute genocide, according to the legal definition of this crime. Those who deny this constitute a tiny minority". As historian Tessa Hofmann notes: "Most scholars of genocide today agree that the massacres, deportations and slave labor of the Ottoman Greeks correspond with Raphael Lemkin's and the United Nations' definition of genocide". Historian David Gaunt also considers the matter "settled amongst scholars".

Earlier opinions shifted variously. For example, in 2005, Manus Midlarsky noted a disjunction between statements of genocidal intent against the Greeks by Ottoman officials and their actions, pointing to the containment of massacres in selected "sensitive" areas and the large numbers of Greek survivors at the end of the war. Because of cultural and political ties of the Ottoman Greeks with European powers, Midlarsky argues, genocide was "not a viable option for the Ottomans in their case." However, in 2014, Midlarsky modified his view, noting in a review of Michelle Tusan's Smyrna's Ashes: "All of these groups had horrific tales to tell of genocide (the Armenians, Pontic Greeks, and Assyrians) and brutal ethnic cleansing (the remainder of the Anatolian Greeks)".

Similarly, in 2012, Taner Akçam referred to contemporary accounts noting the difference in government treatment of Ottoman Greeks and Armenians during WWI, and concluded that "despite the increasingly severe wartime policies, in particular for the period between late 1916 and the first months of 1917, the government's treatment of the Greeks – although comparable in some ways to the measures against the Armenians – differed in scope, intent, and motivation." However, in 2023, Akçam wrote about "ethnic cleansings of Greeks in the Ottoman Balkans and Western Anatolia in 1913 and 1914", while accepting that "genocide against Pontus Greeks" occurred in 1921–1922.

Some historians, including Boris Barth, Michael Schwartz, and Andrekos Varnava argue that the persecution of Greeks was ethnic cleansing or deportation, but not genocide. This is also a position of some Greek mainstream historians; according to Aristide Caratzas this is due to a number of factors, "which range from governmental reticence to criticize Turkey to spilling over into the academic world, to ideological currents promoting a diffuse internationalism cultivated by a network of NGOs, often supported by western governments and western interests". Others, such as Dominik J. Schaller and Jürgen Zimmerer, argue that the "genocidal quality of the murderous campaigns against Greeks" was "obvious". The historians Samuel Totten and Paul R. Bartrop, who specialize on the history of genocides, also call it a genocide. Another scholar who considers it a genocide is Hannibal Travis; he also adds that the widespread attacks by the successive governments of Turkey, on the homes, places of worship, and heritage of minority communities since the 1930s, constitute cultural genocide as well.

Dror Ze'evi and Benny Morris, authors of The Thirty-Year Genocide, write that:

... the story of what happened in Turkey is much broader and deeper [than just the Armenian genocide]. It goes deeper, because it covers not just what occurred during World War I, but a series of giant ethno-religious massacres that lasted from the 1890s through the 1920s and beyond. It is broader, because it was not only Armenians who were persecuted and killed. Along with hundreds of thousands of Armenians ... a similar number of Greeks and Assyrians (or adherents of the Assyrian or Syriac churches) were slaughtered ... By our estimate, over the course of the 30-year period, between 1.5 and 2.5 million Christians from the three religious groups were either murdered or intentionally starved to death, or allowed to die of disease, and millions more were expelled from Turkey and lost everything. In addition, tens of thousands of Christians were forced to convert to Islam, and many thousands of Christian women and girls were raped, either by their Muslim neighbors or by members of the security forces. The Turks even opened markets where Christian girls were sold as sex slaves. These atrocities were committed by three very different, successive regimes: Sultan Abdülhamid II's authoritarian-Islamist regime; the government of the Committee of Union and Progress (the Young Turks) during World War I, under the leadership of Talaat Pasha and Enver Pasha; and Mustafa Kemal Atatürk's post-war secular nationalist regime.

=== Political recognition ===
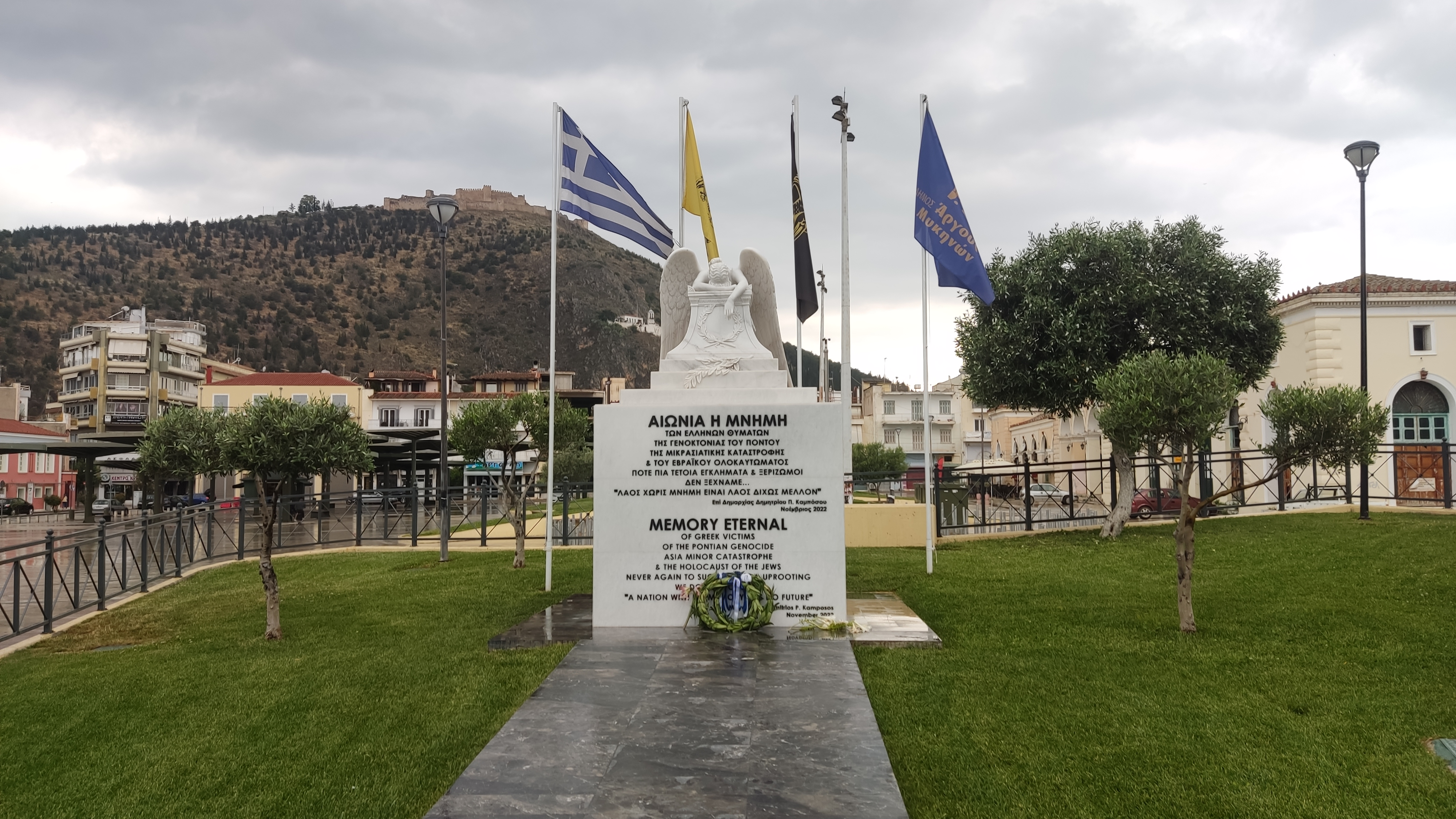
Monument in Argos, Greece for the Greek genocide and the Holocaust

Following an initiative of MPs of the so-called "patriotic" wing of the ruling PASOK party's parliamentary group and like-minded MPs of conservative New Democracy, the Greek Parliament passed two laws on the fate of the Ottoman Greeks; the first in 1994 and the second in 1998. The decrees were published in the Greek Government Gazette on 8 March 1994 and 13 October 1998 respectively. The 1994 decree, created by Georgios Daskalakis, affirmed the genocide in the Pontus region of Asia Minor and designated 19 May (the day Mustafa Kemal landed in Samsun in 1919) a day of commemoration, (called Pontian Greek Genocide Remembrance Day) while the 1998 decree affirmed the genocide of Greeks in Asia Minor as a whole and designated 14 September a day of commemoration. These laws were signed by the President of Greece but were not immediately ratified after political interventions. After leftist newspaper I Avgi initiated a campaign against the application of this law, the subject became subject of a political debate. The president of the left-ecologist Synaspismos party Nikos Konstantopoulos and historian Angelos Elefantis, known for his books on the history of Greek communism, were two of the major figures of the political left who expressed their opposition to the decree. However, the non-parliamentary left-wing nationalist intellectual and author George Karabelias bitterly criticized Elefantis and others opposing the recognition of genocide and called them "revisionist historians", accusing the Greek mainstream left of a "distorted ideological evolution". He said that for the Greek left 19 May is a "day of amnesia".

In the late 2000s the Communist Party of Greece adopted the term "Genocide of the Pontic (Greeks)" (Γενοκτονία Ποντίων) in its official newspaper Rizospastis and participates in memorial events.

The Republic of Cyprus has also officially called the events "Greek Genocide in Pontus of Asia Minor".

In response to the 1998 law, the Turkish government released a statement which claimed that describing the events as genocide was "without any historical basis". "We condemn and protest this resolution" a Turkish Foreign Ministry statement said. "With this resolution the Greek Parliament, which in fact has to apologize to the Turkish people for the large-scale destruction and massacres Greece perpetrated in Anatolia, not only sustains the traditional Greek policy of distorting history, but it also displays that the expansionist Greek mentality is still alive," the statement added.

On 11 March 2010, Sweden's Riksdag passed a motion recognising "as an act of genocide the killing of Armenians, Assyrians/Syriacs/Chaldeans and Pontic Greeks in 1915".

On 14 May 2013, the government of New South Wales was submitted a genocide recognition motion by Fred Nile of the Christian Democratic Party, which was later passed making it the fourth political entity to recognise the genocide.

In March 2015, the National Assembly of Armenia unanimously adopted a resolution recognizing both the Greek and Assyrian genocides.

In April 2015, the States General of the Netherlands and the Austrian Parliament passed resolutions recognizing the Greek and Assyrian genocides.

=== Reasons for limited recognition ===
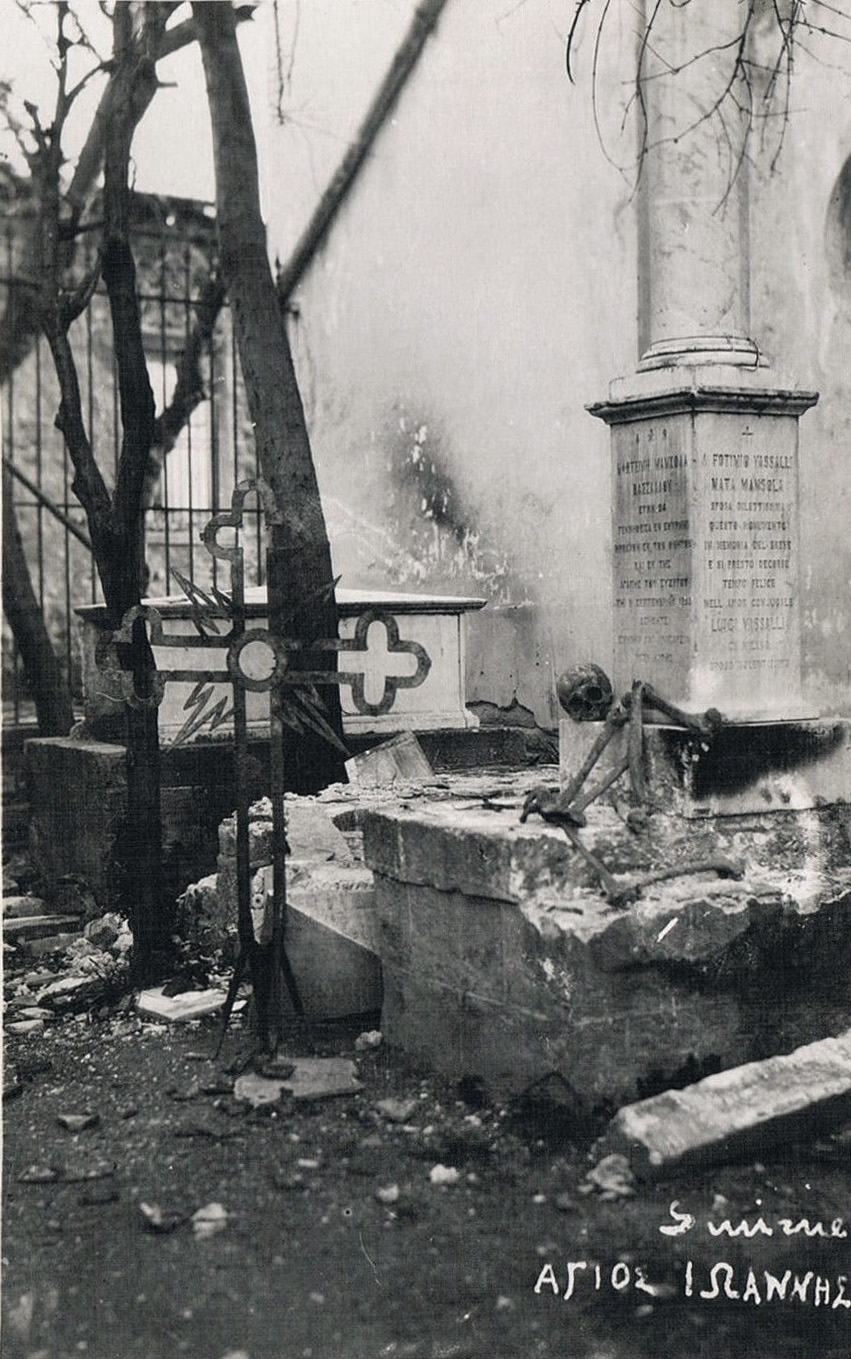
Desecrated graves in the cemetery of Saint John Prodromos during the Smyrna massacres, September 1922

The United Nations, the European Parliament, and the Council of Europe have not made any related statements. According to Constantine Fotiadis, professor of Modern Greek History at the Aristotle University of Thessaloniki, some of the reasons for the lack of wider recognition and delay in seeking acknowledgement of these events are as follows:

- In contrast to the Treaty of Sèvres, the superseding Treaty of Lausanne in 1923 dealt with these events by making no reference or mention, and thus sealed the end of the Asia Minor Catastrophe.
- A subsequent peace treaty (Greco-Turkish Treaty of Friendship in June 1930) between Greece and Turkey. Greece made several concessions to settle all open issues between the two countries in return for peace in the region.
- The Second World War, the Civil War, the Military junta and the political turmoil in Greece that followed, forced Greece to focus on its survival and other problems rather than seek recognition of these events.
- The political environment of the Cold War, in which Turkey and Greece were supposed to be allies – facing one common Communist enemy – not adversaries or competitors.

In his book With Intent to Destroy: Reflections on Genocide, Colin Tatz argues that Turkey denies the genocide so as not to jeopardize "its ninety-five-year-old dream of becoming the beacon of democracy in the Near East".

In their book Negotiating the Sacred: Blasphemy and Sacrilege in a Multicultural Society, Elizabeth Burns Coleman and Kevin White present a list of reasons explaining Turkey's inability to admit the genocides committed by the Young Turks, writing:

Turkish denialism of the genocide of 1.5 million Armenians is official, riven, driven, constant, rampant, and increasing each year since the events of 1915 to 1922. It is state-funded, with special departments and units in overseas missions whose sole purpose is to dilute, counter, minimise, trivialise and relativise every reference to the events which encompassed a genocide of Armenians, Pontian Greeks and Assyrian Christians in Asia Minor.

They propose the following reasons for the denial of the genocides by Turkey:

- A suppression of guilt and shame that a warrior nation, a "beacon of democracy" as it saw itself in 1908 (and since), slaughtered several ethnic populations. Democracies, it is said, don't commit genocide; ergo, Turkey couldn't and didn't do so.
- A cultural and social ethos of honour, a compelling and compulsive need to remove any blots on the national escutcheon.
- A chronic fear that admission will lead to massive claims for reparation and restitution.
- To overcome fears of social fragmentation in a society that is still very much a state in transition.
- A "logical" belief that because the genocide was committed with impunity, so denial will also meet with neither opposition nor obloquy.
- An inner knowledge that the juggernaut denial industry has a momentum of its own and can't be stopped even if they wanted it to stop.

== The genocide as a model for Nazi crimes ==
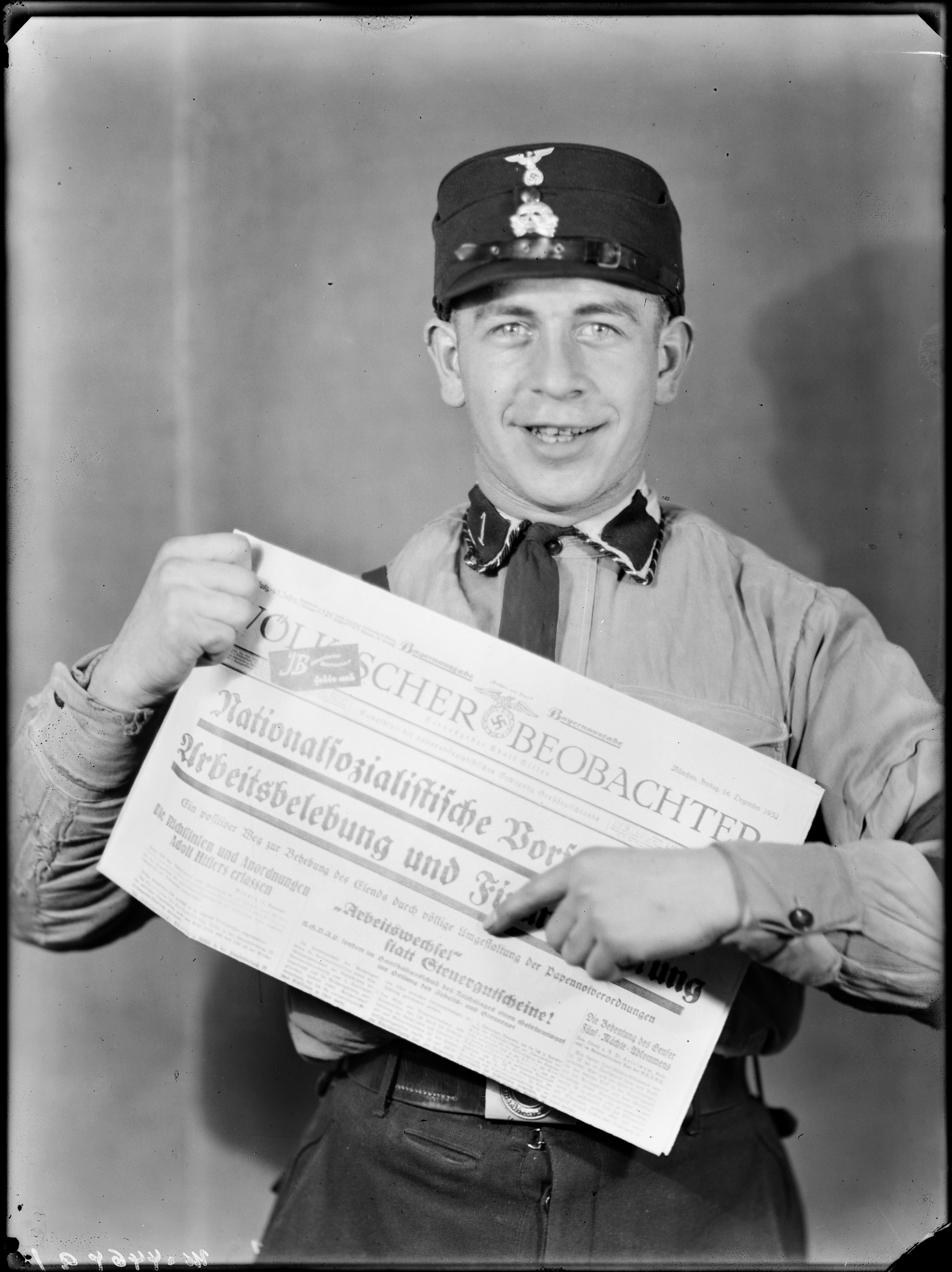
From the early 1920s, Nazi Party publications, such as the Völkischer Beobachter, presented Kemal Atatürk as a role model, labeling him "Führer".

According to Stefan Ihrig, Kemal's "model" remained active for the Nazi movement in Weimar Germany and the Third Reich until the end of World War II. Adolf Hitler had declared that he considered himself a "student" of Kemal, whom he referred to as his "star in the darkness", while the latter's contribution to the formation of National Socialist ideology is intensely apparent in Nazi literature. Kemal and his new Turkey of 1923 constituted the archetype of the "perfect Führer" and of "good national practices" for Nazism. The news media of the Third Reich emphasised the "Turkish model" and continuously praised the "benefits" of ethnic cleansing and genocide. Hitler referred to Kemal as being of Germanic descent.

Hitler's National Socialist Party, from its first steps, had used the methods of the Turkish state as a standard to draw inspiration from. The official Nazi newspaper Völkischer Beobachter ("Völkisch Observer"), on its February 1921 issue, stressed with admiration in an article titled "The Role Model": "The German nation will one day have no other choice but to resort to Turkish methods as well."

A Nazi publication of 1925 exalted the new Turkish state for its "cleansing" policy, which "threw the Greek element to the sea". The majority of writers of the Third Reich stressed that the double genocide (against Greeks and Armenians) was a prerequisite for the success of the new Turkey, according to Ihrig.

In September 1933, following contact by Albert Einstein, Kemal granted asylum to thousands of Jews seeking refuge from the Nazi repression, and many scientists were employed at Turkish universities – it thus resulted in a deterioration of diplomatic relations. Worsening relations between neutral Turkey and the Axis bloc caused Turkey to apply the League of Nations for economic sanctions against Italy, and Kemal actively engaged in public statements against Hitler, albeit he had avoided doing so for a few years in an attempt to not inflame the Nazi regime. Referring to Mussolini as "clown" and "his copycat", Kemal eventually called Hitler a "maniac corporal" and a "racist who considers the German race as superior". In another meeting, he described Nazism as a dangerous imitation of fascism.

== Memorials ==
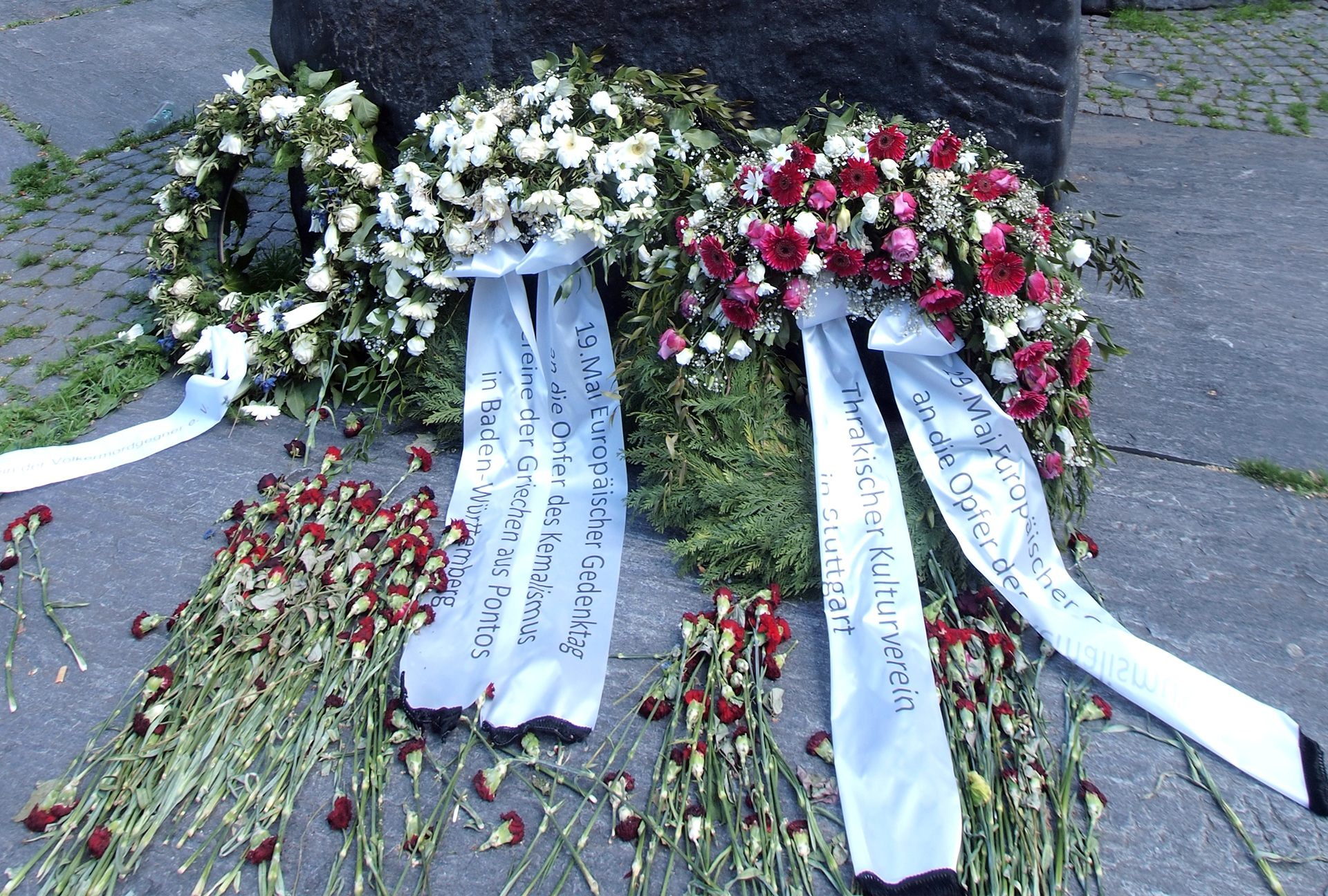
Wreaths dedicated "to the victims of Kemalism" after a commemoration ceremony in Stuttgart, Germany

Memorials commemorating the plight of Ottoman Greeks have been erected throughout Greece, as well as in a number of other countries including Australia, Canada, Germany, Sweden, and the United States.

== Literature ==
The Greek genocide is remembered in a number of modern works.

- Not Even My Name by Thea Halo is the story of the survival, at age ten, of her mother Sano (Themia) Halo (original name Euthemia "Themia" Barytimidou, Pontic Greek: Ευθυμία Βαρυτιμίδου), along the death march during the Greek genocide that annihilated her family. The title refers to Themia being renamed to Sano by an Arabic-speaking family who could not pronounce her Greek name, after they took her in as a servant during the Greek genocide.
- Number 31328 is an autobiography by the Greek novelist Elias Venezis that tells of his experiences during the Greek genocide on a death march into the interior from his native home in Ayvali (Greek: Kydonies, Κυδωνίες), Turkey. Of the 3000 "conscripted" into his "labour brigade" (otherwise known as Amele Taburlari or Amele Taburu) only 23 survived. The title refers to the number assigned to Elias by the Turkish army during the death march. The book was made into a movie called 1922 by Nikos Koundouros in 1978, but was banned in Greece until 1982 because of pressure from the Turkish Foreign Ministry, who complained that the film would ruin Greek–Turkish relations.

== See also ==
- 1914 Greek deportations
- 1915 genocide in Diyarbekir
- Armenian genocide
- Burning of Smyrna
- Cyprus conflict
- Deportations of Kurds (1916–1934)
- Destruction of the Thracian Bulgarians in 1913
- Greek refugees
- Human rights in Turkey
- Istanbul pogrom
- İzmit massacres
- List of massacres in Turkey
- Outline and timeline of the Greek genocide
- Republic of Pontus
- Sayfo
- Tel Aviv and Jaffa deportation
- Turkish war crimes
- Greek Genocide Resource Center

== Bibliography ==
=== Contemporary accounts ===
- Horton, George (1926), The Blight of Asia, Indianapolis: Bobbs-Merrill, archived from the original on 1 January 2013
- King, William C (1922), Complete History of the World War: Visualizing the Great Conflict in all Theaters of Action 1914–1918, Springfield, Massachusetts: The History Associates
- Morgenthau, Henry sr (1918), Ambassador Morgenthau's Story (PDF), Garden City, New York: Doubleday, Page & Co, archived from the original (PDF) on 24 January 2013
- ——— (1919) [1918], Ambassador Morgenthau's Story, Garden City, New York: Doubleday, Page & Co
- Patriarchate of Constantinople (1919), Persecution of the Greeks in Turkey, Istanbul, Turkey: Greek Patriarchate, archived from the original on 21 November 2017 Alt URL
- Rendel, G. W. (20 March 1922), Memorandum by Mr. Rendel on Turkish Massacres and Persecutions of Minorities since the Armistice (memorandum), British Foreign Office, archived from the original on 16 April 2022
- Toynbee, Arnold J. (1922), The Western question in Greece and Turkey: a study in the contact of civilisations, Boston: Houghton Mifflin
- Valavanis, G. K. (1925), Sýnchronos Genikí Istoría tou Póntou Σύγχρονος Γενική Ιστορία του Πόντου [Contemporary General History of Pontus] (in Greek), Athens: Pamprosfygiki, archived from the original on 8 November 2015

=== Secondary sources ===
- Akçam, Taner (2004). From Empire to Republic: Turkish Nationalism and the Armenian Genocide. Zed Books.
- Akçam, Taner (21 August 2007). A Shameful Act: The Armenian Genocide and the Question of Turkish Responsibility. Henry Holt and Company. ISBN 978-1-4668-3212-1.
- Akçam, Taner (2012). The Young Turks' Crime Against Humanity: The Armenian Genocide and Ethnic Cleansing in the Ottoman Empire. Princeton/Oxford: Princeton University Press.
- Agtzidis, Vlasis (1992). "To kínima anexartisías tou Póntou kai oi aftónomes Ellinikés periochés sti Sovietikí Énosi tou mesopolémou" Το κίνημα ανεξαρτησίας του Πόντου και οι αυτόνομες Ελληνικές περιοχές στη Σοβιετική Ένωση του μεσοπολέμου [The movement for the independence of Pontus and the autonomous Greek regions in the Soviet Union during the interwar period]. Bulletin of the Asia Minor Studies Center (in Greek). 9 (1): 157–196. doi:10.12681/deltiokms.135.
- Georganopoulos, Evripidis (2010). "I prospátheia sýstasis ellinikís merarchías Kafkásou to 1917 kai oi lógoi tis apotychías tis" Η προσπάθεια σύστασης ελληνικής μεραρχίας Καυκάσου το 1917 και οι λόγοι της αποτυχίας της [The attempt to raise the Greek Caucasus Division and the reasons for its failure] (PDF). 1st Panhellenic History Congress (in Greek). 1 (1): 227–251.
- Alexandris, Alexis (1999). "The Greek census of Anatolia and Thrace (1910–1912): a contribution to Ottoman Historical Demography". In Gondicas, Dimitri; Issawi, Charles (eds.). Ottoman Greeks in the age of nationalism: Politics, Economy and Society in the Nineteenth Century. Princeton, N.J.: Darwin. pp. 45–76.
- Ascherson, Neal (1995), Black Sea, New York: Hill and Wang, ISBN 0-8090-3043-8
- Avedian, Vahagn (2009), The Armenian Genocide 1915: From a Neutral Small State's Perspective: Sweden (PDF) (unpublished master thesis paper), Uppsala University
- Bassiouni, M. Cherif (1999). Crimes Against Humanity in International Criminal Law. The Hague: Kluwer.
- Bierstadt, Edward Hale (1924). The Great Betrayal; A Survey of the Near East Problem. New York: RM McBride & Co.
- Bloxham, Donald (2005). The Great Game of Genocide: Imperialism, Nationalism, and the Destruction of the Ottoman Armenians. Oxford: Oxford University Press.
- Ferguson, Niall (2006). The War of the World: Twentieth-century Conflict And the Descent of the West. New York: Penguin Books. ISBN 978-1-59420-100-4.
- Fotiadis, Constantinos Emm (2004). The Genocide of the Pontus Greeks by the Turks. Volumes 13, 14. Thessaloniki: Herodotus. ISBN 978-618-00-1272-9.
- Hatzidimitriou, Constantine G. (2005). American Accounts Documenting the Destruction of Smyrna by the Kemalist Turkish Forces: September 1922. New Rochelle, NY: Caratzas.
- Hulse, Carl (26 October 2007). "U.S. and Turkey Thwart Armenian Genocide Bill". The New York Times.
- Hull, Isabel V. (2005). Absolute Destruction: Military Culture and the Practices of War in Imperial Germany. Ithaca: Cornell University Press.
- Ihrig, Stefan (2014). Atatürk in the Nazi Imagination. Harvard University Press. ISBN 978-0-674-36837-8.
- Jones, Adam (2006). Genocide: A Comprehensive Introduction. Routledge.
- ——— (2010) [2006]. Genocide: A Comprehensive Introduction. Taylor & Francis. ISBN 978-0-415-48618-7.
- ——— (2010a) [2006]. Genocide: A Comprehensive Introduction (revised ed.). London: Routledge. ISBN 978-0-203-84696-4. OCLC 672333335.
- Karpat, Kemal (1985). Ottoman Population, 1830–1914: Demographic and Social Characteristics. Madison: Madison University Press.
- Kostópoulos, Tásos (2007). Pólemos kai Ethnokátharsi: I xechasméni plevrá mias dekaetoús ethnikís exórmisis (1912-1922) Πόλεμος και Εθνοκάθαρση: Η ξεχασμένη πλευρά μιας δεκαετούς εθνικής εξόρμησης (1912-1922) [War and Ethnic Cleansing: The Forgotten Side of a Ten-Year National Expedition (1912-1922)] (in Greek). Athens: Βιβλιόραμα.
- Levene, Mark (Winter 1998). "Creating a Modern "Zone of Genocide": The Impact of Nation- and State-Formation on Eastern Anatolia, 1878–1923". Holocaust and Genocide Studies. 12 (3): 393–433. doi:10.1093/hgs/12.3.393. Archived from the original on 3 October 2006.
- Midlarsky, Manus I. (2005). The Killing Trap: Genocide in the Twentieth Century. Cambridge University Press. ISBN 978-0-521-81545-1.
- Naimark, Norman M. (2001). Fires of Hatred: Ethnic Cleansing in Twentieth-Century Europe. Cambridge and London: Harvard University Press.
- Peterson, Merrill D. (2004). Starving Armenians: America and the Armenian Genocide, 1915–1930 and After. Charlottesville: University of Virginia Press.
- Schaller, Dominik J.; Zimmerer, Jürgen, eds. (2009). Late Ottoman Genocides: The Dissolution of the Ottoman Empire and Young Turkish Population and Extermination Policies. Routledge. ISBN 978-0-415-48012-3.
- Sjöberg, Erik (2016). The Making of the Greek Genocide: Contested Memories of the Ottoman Greek Catastrophe. Berghahn Books. ISBN 978-1-78533-326-2.
- Tatz, Colin (2003). With Intent to Destroy: Reflections on Genocide. Essex: Verso Books. ISBN 978-1-85984-550-9.
- Travis, Hannibal (2009). "The Cultural and Intellectual Property Interests of the Indigenous Peoples of Turkey and Iraq". Texas Wesleyan Law Review. 15 (2): 601–80. doi:10.37419/TWLR.V15.I2.6. SSRN 1549804.
