= Erik Sjöberg (historian) =

Swedish historian (born 1978)

Erik Sjöberg, born 1978, is a historian and associate professor at Södertörn University.

In "The Making of the Greek Genocide: Contested Memories of the Ottoman Greek Catastrophe", Sjöberg critiques the political construction of the 'Greek genocide' narrative, arguing that its official recognition was driven primarily by modern identity politics, diaspora lobbying, and human rights frameworks rather than historical consensus.

== Works ==
- Sjöberg, Erik (2016). The Making of the Greek Genocide: Contested Memories of the Ottoman Greek Catastrophe. Berghahn Books. ISBN 978-1-78533-326-2.
