= Greek Genocide Resource Center =

Australian historical resource website established in 2010

- Abbreviation: GGRC
- Formation: 2010
- Founder: Aris Tsilfidis (co-founder)
- Location: Victoria, Australia
- Affiliations: Alliance Against Genocide
- Website: www.greek-genocide.net

The Greek Genocide Resource Center (GGRC) is an Australian online resource center devoted to documenting the Greek genocide.

Established in 2010 and based in Victoria, Australia, it maintains collections of historical documents and survivor accounts, advocating recognition of the genocide. Aris Tsilfidis is a co-founder of the center.

== History and activities ==
The center's website contains eyewitness testimonies, historical newspaper reports, photographs, bibliographies and maps of massacres and deportations. Its material covers Greek communities in Pontus, Eastern Thrace and Anatolia. The center also donates reading material to educational institutions. It also publishes translations, memoirs and books related to the genocide. The center's collections and analyses have been cited in several academic publications.

The GGRC has campaigned for recognition encompassing all Greek genocide victims from across the former Ottoman Empire, rather than only those from Pontus. For example, in a 2022 statement, the center criticized a proposed Canadian parliamentary recognition measure that had been limited to Pontic Greeks.

The center is a member of the Alliance Against Genocide.
