= List of genocides =

This list includes all events which have been classified as genocide by significant scholarship. As there are varying definitions of genocide, this list includes events around which there is ongoing scholarly debate over their classification as genocide and is not a list of only events which have a scholarly consensus to recognize them as genocide. This list excludes mass killings which have not been explicitly defined as genocidal. (Note: eg. Thirty Years' War (4.5 to 8 million deaths), Japanese war crimes (30 million deaths), the Red Terror (50,000 to 200,000 deaths), the Great Purge (0.7 to 1.2 million deaths), the Great Leap Forward and the famine which followed it (15 to 55 million deaths).) According to the Genocide Convention, genocides have happened in all historical periods.

== Concept of genocide ==
Polish–Jewish lawyer Raphael Lemkin coined the term "genocide" in response to world events such as the Armenian genocide and World War II. His initial definition was "the destruction of a nation or of an ethnic group" in which its members were not targeted as individuals, but rather as members of the group. The objectives of genocide "would be the disintegration of the political and social institutions, of culture, language, national feelings, religion, and the economic existence of national groups". Lemkin brought his proposal to criminalize genocide to the newly established United Nations in 1946. Opposition to the convention was greater than Lemkin expected due to states' concerns that it would lead their own policies—including treatment of indigenous peoples, European colonialism, racial segregation in the United States, and Soviet nationalities policy—to be labeled genocide. Before the convention was passed, powerful countries (both Western powers and the Soviet Union) secured changes in an attempt to make the convention unenforceable and applicable to their geopolitical rivals' actions but not their own. Few formerly colonized countries were represented and "most states had no interest in empowering their victims– past, present, and future".

The 1948 Genocide Convention defines genocide as:

... any of the following acts committed with intent to destroy, in whole or in part, a national, ethnical, racial or religious group, as such:

- (a) Killing members of the group;
- (b) Causing serious bodily or mental harm to members of the group;
- (c) Deliberately inflicting on the group conditions of life calculated to bring about its physical destruction in whole or in part;
- (d) Imposing measures intended to prevent births within the group;
- (e) Forcibly transferring children of the group to another group.

The result severely diluted Lemkin's original concept; he privately considered it a failure. Lemkin's anti-colonial conception of genocide was transformed into one that favored colonial powers. Among the violence freed from the stigma of genocide was the destruction of political groups, which the Soviet Union is particularly blamed for blocking. Although Lemkin credited women's NGOs with securing the passage of the convention, the gendered violence of forced pregnancy, marriage, and divorce was left out. Additionally omitted was the forced migration of populations—which had been carried out by the Soviet Union and its satellites, condoned by the Western Allies, against millions of Germans from central and Eastern Europe.

Many countries have incorporated genocide into their municipal law, varying to a lesser or greater extent from the convention. The convention's definition of genocide was adopted verbatim by the ad hoc international criminal tribunals and by the Rome Statute that established the International Criminal Court (ICC). The crime of genocide also exists in customary international law and is therefore prohibited for non-signatories. Scholarship varies on the definition of genocide employed when analysing whether events are genocidal in nature. The Convention and other definitions are generally regarded by the majority of genocide scholars to have an "intent to destroy" as a requirement for any act to be labelled genocide; there is also growing agreement on the inclusion of the physical destruction criterion. According to Ernesto Verdeja, associate professor of political science and peace studies at the University of Notre Dame, there are three ways to conceptualize genocide other than the legal definition: in academic social science, in international politics and policy, and in colloquial public usage. Many social scientists do not require that intent be proved beyond a reasonable doubt and may include other groups of people in addition to the legally protected ones, such as political groups (which can also be termed politicide). The international politics and policy definition centres around prevention policy and intervention and may actually mean "large-scale violence against civilians" when used by governments and international organizations. Lastly, Verdeja says the way the general public colloquially uses "genocide" is usually "as a stand-in term for the greatest evils".

== List ==
The term genocide is contentious and as a result its definition varies. This list only considers acts which are recognized in significant scholarship as genocides.

List of genocides in reverse chronological order
| Event | Location | Period | | Estimated killings | |
| Event | Location | From | To | Lowest | Highest |
| Description | | Number or proportion of group killed | | | |
|---|---|---|---|---|---|
| Gaza genocide | Israeli-occupied Gaza Strip, Palestine | 2023 | Present | 73,400 (Note: Per the Gaza Health Ministry and Government Information Office, which has previously been deemed reliable by prominent and independent organizations.) | 335,500 (Note: Using methods described in The Lancet, Devi Sridhar, the chair of global health at the University of Edinburgh, wrote in a September 2024 editorial that "the total deaths since the conflict began would be estimated at about 335,500 in total [by the end of 2024]".) |
| The Gaza genocide is the ongoing systematic destruction of the Palestinian people in the Gaza Strip by Israel during the Gaza war, carried out with the intent to destroy Gaza's population in whole or in part through extermination, the deliberate killing of children (making up about 30% of those killed), starvation, bombing, blockade, and invasion. Other genocidal acts include destroying civilian infrastructure, killing healthcare workers and aid-seekers, using mass forced displacement, committing sexual violence, and restricting birth. The genocide has been recognized by consensus amongst experts, a United Nations special committee and commission of inquiry; humanitarian and human rights organizations, including Amnesty International, Médecins Sans Frontières, and Human Rights Watch; international law experts; and genocide studies scholars, including 86% of voters in the International Association of Genocide Scholars. | | More than 10,000 presumed dead under rubble. | | | |
| Blockade of Nagorno-Karabakh and expulsion of Nagorno-Karabakh Armenians | Nagorno-Karabakh, Azerbaijan | 2022 | 2023 | | |
| Azerbaijan's blockade and ethnic cleansing of Armenian people through repeated military offensives in Nagorno-Karabakh has been characterized as a genocide in multiple sources. | | Up to 99.99% of Armenians were expelled from Nagorno-Karabakh to Armenia, fleeing through the military checkpoint on the Lachin corridor. | | | |
| Rohingya genocide | Rakhine State, Myanmar | 2016 | Present | 9,000–13,700 | 43,000 |
| The Rohingya genocide is a series of ongoing persecutions and killings of the Muslim Rohingya people by the military of Myanmar. The genocide has consisted of two phases to date: the first was a military crackdown that occurred from October 2016 to January 2017, and the second has been occurring since August 2017. The crisis forced over a million Rohingya to flee to other countries. Most fled to Bangladesh, resulting in the creation of the world's largest refugee camp, while others escaped to India, Malaysia, Saudi Arabia, and other parts of South and Southeast Asia, where they continue to face persecution. The Rohingya are denied citizenship under the 1982 Myanmar nationality law, and are regarded as Bengali immigrants by the Myanmar government, to the extent it refuses to acknowledge the Rohingya's existence as a valid ethnic group. | | Before the 2015 refugee crisis, the Rohingya population in Myanmar was around 1.0 to 1.3 million. Since 2015, over 900,000 Rohingya refugees have fled to southeastern Bangladesh alone, and more to other surrounding countries. More than 100,000 Rohingyas in Myanmar are confined in camps for internally displaced persons. | | | |
| Persecution of Uyghurs in China | Xinjiang, China | 2016 | Present | | |
| Widespread human rights violations by the Chinese Communist Party against the Uyghur people (a Turkic ethnic group) and other Muslim minorities have often been characterized as genocide. There have been reports of mass arbitrary arrests and detention, torture, mass surveillance, cultural and religious persecution, family separation, forced labour, sexual violence, and violations of reproductive rights, including forced abortion and compulsory sterilization. The Uyghur Tribunal concluded that there was "no evidence of mass killings" but that "alleged efforts to prevent births amounted to genocidal intent." Human Rights Watch stated in its 2021 report that the organization "has not documented the existence of the necessary genocidal intent at this time." | | Birth rates among Uyghurs had fallen by 24% as of 2020 due to Chinese policies. | | | |
| Ukrainian genocide | Ukraine (including Russian-occupied Ukraine) | 2014 | Present | 20,000 (Note: 3,404 killed between 2014–2022, and 16,431 killed since the February 2022 Russian invasion of Ukraine) | 50,000 |
| Several genocide scholars, commentators, legal experts, human rights organizations and the national parliaments of several countries have declared that Russian war crimes and crimes against humanity committed against Ukrainian civilians during the Russo-Ukrainian war, including mass killings, deliberate attacks on shelters, evacuation routes, and humanitarian corridors, indiscriminate bombardment of residential areas, deliberate and systematic infliction of life-threatening conditions by military sieges, rape and sexual violence amount to genocide and incitement to genocide with intent to destroy the Ukrainian national group. This further escalated following the 2022 invasion of Ukraine by Russia, including through Russia's kidnapping of Ukrainian children from occupied territory, which prompted ICC arrest warrants against Vladimir Putin and other Russian officials. | | Also includes the unlawful deportation and transfer of over 307,000 Ukrainian children into Russia. | | | |
| Yazidi genocide | Iraq and Syria (within Islamic State territory) | 2014 | 2017 | 2,100 | 5,000 |
| The Yazidi genocide was perpetrated by the Islamic State throughout Iraq and Syria between 2014 and 2017. It was characterized by massacres, genocidal rape, and forced conversions to Islam. Over a period of three years, Islamic State militants trafficked thousands of Yazidi women and girls and killed thousands of Yazidi men. The United Nations' Commission of Inquiry on Syria officially declared in its report that ISIS was committing genocide against the Yazidis population. It is difficult to assess a precise figure for the killings but it is known that some thousand of Yazidis men and boys were still unaccounted for and ISIS genocidal actions against Yazidis people were still ongoing, as stated by the International Commission in June 2016. See also: 2007 Yazidi communities bombings | | A study found 3,100 killed and 6,800 were kidnapped, amounting to 2.5% of Yazidis being either killed or kidnapped. By 2015, upwards of 71% of the global Yazidi population was displaced by the genocide, with most Yazidi refugees having fled to Iraq's Kurdistan Region and Syria's Rojava. | | | |
| Darfur genocide (2003–2005) | Darfur, Sudan | 2003 | 2005 | 98,000 | 500,000 |
| The Darfur genocide is the systematic killing of ethnic Darfuri people which has occurred during the war in Darfur. The genocide, which is being carried out against the Fur, Masalit and Zaghawa ethnic groups, has led the International Criminal Court to indict several people for crimes against humanity, rape, forced transfer and torture. This includes Sudan's president Omar al-Bashir for his role in the genocide. An estimated 200,000 people were killed between 2003 and 2005. These atrocities have been called the first genocide of the 21st century. | | | | | |
| Effacer le tableau | North Kivu, Democratic Republic of the Congo | 2002 | 2003 | 60,000 | 70,000 |
| Effacer le tableau ("erasing the board") was the operational name given to the systematic extermination of the Bambuti pygmies by rebel forces in the Democratic Republic of the Congo (DRC). The primary objective of Effacer le tableau was the territorial conquest of the North Kivu province of the DRC and ethnic cleansing of Pygmies from the Congo's eastern region. | | 40% of the Eastern Congo's Pygmy population killed. (Note: Eastern Pygmy population was reduced to 90,000 after a campaign that killed 60,000 implying a 40% decline) | | | |
| Massacres of Hutus during the First Congo War | Kivu, Zaire | 1996 | 1997 | 200,000 | 233,000 |
| During the First Congo War, troops of the Rwanda-backed Alliance des Forces Démocratiques pour la Libération du Congo-Zaïre (AFDL) conducted mass killings of Rwandan, Congolese, and Burundian Hutu men, women, and children in villages and refugee camps in eastern Zaire (now named the Democratic Republic of the Congo). Elements of the AFDL and the Rwandan Patriotic Army (RPA) systematically shelled numerous camps and committed massacres with light weapons. These early attacks killed 6,800–8,000 refugees and forced the repatriation of 500,000 – 700,000 refugees back to Rwanda. As survivors fled westward, the AFDL units hunted them down killing thousands more. | | | | | |
| Rwandan genocide | Rwanda | 1994 | | 491,000 | 800,000 |
| The Rwandan genocide, also known as the genocide against the Tutsi, occurred between 7 April and 19 July 1994 during the Rwandan Civil War. During this period of around 100 days, members of the Tutsi minority ethnic group, as well as some moderate Hutu and Twa, were killed by armed Hutu militias. Although the Constitution of Rwanda states that more than 1 million people perished in the genocide, the actual number of fatalities is unclear, and some estimates suggest that the real number killed was likely lower. The most widely accepted scholarly estimates are around 500,000 to 800,000 Tutsi deaths. | | 60–70% of Tutsis in Rwanda killed.7% of Rwanda's total population killed. | | | |
| Bosnian genocide | Republic of Bosnia and Herzegovina | 1992 | 1995 | 31,107 | 62,013 |
| The Bosnian genocide comprised localized massacres, including those in Srebrenica and Žepa, committed by Bosnian Serb forces in 1995, as well as the scattered ethnic cleansing campaign throughout areas controlled by the Army of Republika Srpska during the 1992–1995 Bosnian War. On 31 March 2010, the Serbian Parliament passed a resolution condemning the Srebrenica massacre and apologizing to the families of Srebrenica for the deaths of Bosniaks ("Bosnian Muslims"). | | More than 3% of the Bosniak population of Bosnia and Herzegovina died during the Bosnian War. | | | |
| Isaaq genocide | Republic of Somaliland, Somali Democratic Republic | 1987 | 1989 | 50,000 | 200,000 |
| The Genocide of Isaaqs was the systematic, state-sponsored massacre of Isaaq civilians between 1988 and 1991 by the Somali Democratic Republic under the dictatorship of Siad Barre. This included the levelling and complete destruction of the second- and third-largest cities in Somalia, Hargeisa (90 per cent destroyed) and Burao (70 per cent destroyed) respectively, and had caused 400,000 Somalis (primarily of the Isaaq clan) to flee their land and cross the border to Hartasheikh in Ethiopia as refugees, with another 400,000 being internally displaced. In 2001, the United Nations commissioned an investigation on past human rights violations in Somalia, specifically to find out if "crimes of international jurisdiction (i.e. war crimes, crimes against humanity or genocide) had been perpetrated during the country's civil war". The investigation was commissioned jointly by the United Nations Co-ordination Unit (UNCU) and the Office of the United Nations High Commissioner for Human Rights. The investigation concluded with a report confirming the crime of genocide to have taken place against the Isaaqs in Somalia. | | | | | |
| Anfal campaign | Kurdistan, Iraqi Republic | 1986 | 1989 | 50,000 | 182,000 |
| The Anfal campaign was a counterinsurgency operation which was carried out by Ba'athist Iraq from February to September 1988 during the Iraqi–Kurdish conflict at the end of the Iran–Iraq War. The campaign targeted rural Kurds because its purpose was to eliminate Kurdish rebel groups and Arabize strategic parts of the Kirkuk Governorate. The Iraqis committed atrocities on the local Kurdish population, mostly civilians. A variety of national governments have passed resolutions recognising the Anfal campaign as a genocide. | | | | | |
| Sabra and Shatila massacre | Beirut, Lebanon | 1982 | | 460 | 3,500 |
| The Sabra and Shatila massacre was the 16–18 September 1982 killings of civilians—mostly Palestinians and Lebanese Shias—in the city of Beirut during the Lebanese Civil War. It was perpetrated by the Lebanese Forces, one of the main Christian militias in Lebanon, and supported by the Israel Defense Forces (IDF) that had surrounded Beirut's Sabra neighbourhood and the adjacent Shatila refugee camp. Both the United Nations and an independent commission headed by Seán MacBride concluded that the massacre was an act of genocide against the Palestinian people, a conclusion concurred with by NGOs such as the Palestinian Return Centre. Human rights scholars Damien Short and Haifa Rashed also described the massacre as genocidal in nature. | | | | | |
| Cambodian genocide | Democratic Kampuchea (Cambodia) | 1975 | 1979 | 1,386,734 | 3,000,000 |
| The Cambodian genocide was the systematic persecution and killing of Cambodian citizens by the Khmer Rouge, led by Pol Pot. The Khmer Rouge emptied the cities and forced Cambodians to relocate to labour camps in the countryside, where mass executions, forced labour, physical abuse, malnutrition, and disease were rampant. Up to 20,000 mass graves, the infamous Killing Fields, were uncovered, where at least 1,386,734 murdered victims found their final resting place. The Khmer Rouge Tribunal found that targeting of Vietnamese and Cham minorities constituted a genocide under the UN Convention. | | 15–33% of total population of Cambodia killed, including 99% of Cambodian Viets, 50% of Cambodian Chinese and Cham, 40% of Cambodian Lao and Thai, 25% of Urban Khmer, 16% of Rural Khmer | | | |
| East Timor genocide | East Timor, Indonesia (modern day Timor-Leste) | 1974 | 1999 | 85,320 | 196,720 |
| The East Timor genocide refers to the "pacification campaigns" of state terrorism which were waged by the Indonesian New Order government during the Indonesian invasion and occupation of East Timor. Genocide scholars at Oxford University and Yale University acknowledge the Indonesian occupation of East Timor as genocide. The truth commission held Indonesian forces responsible for about 70% of the violent killings. | | 13% to 44% of East Timor's total population killed (See death toll of East Timor genocide) | | | |
| Bangladesh genocide | East Pakistan (now Bangladesh) | 1971 | | 300,000 | 3,000,000 |
| The Bangladesh genocide was the ethnic cleansing of Bengalis, especially Bengali Hindus, residing in East Pakistan (now Bangladesh) during the Bangladesh Liberation War, perpetrated by the Pakistan Armed Forces and the Razakars. It began as Operation Searchlight was launched by West Pakistan (now Pakistan) to militarily subdue the Bengali population of East Pakistan; the Bengalis comprised the demographic majority and had been calling for independence. Seeking to curtail the Bengali self-determination movement, Pakistani president Yahya Khan approved a large-scale military deployment, and in the nine-month-long conflict that ensued, Pakistani soldiers and local militias killed between 300,000 and 3,000,000 Bengalis and raped between 200,000 and 400,000 Bengali women in a systematic campaign of mass murder and genocidal sexual violence. | | 4% of the population of East Pakistan | | | |
| Nigerian Civil War, particularly the blockade of Biafra | Biafra | 1967 | 1970 | 1,000,000 | More than 1,000,000 |
| Biafra attracted a large amount of international attention from mid-1968, when images of starving Biafran children began to appear in the international press. Biafran propaganda compared Igbo to Jews and the blockade of Biafra to the Holocaust. Initially, international public opinion was sympathetic to Biafran claims, but shifted after the United Kingdom sent a fact finding mission to Nigeria that reported that genocide was not occurring. Some scholars have criticized the fact finding mission for not properly investigating the genocide claims. The mission only investigated where Nigeria allowed them to investigate. Additionally, the mission dismissed rape by Nigerian soldiers as "enforced marriage". Soon after the civil war ended in 1970, it was largely forgotten outside Nigeria and not much mentioned in the field of genocide studies. | | Most of the war casualties were civilians particularly children, who were especially vulnerable to malnutrition. | | | |
| Maya genocide | Guatemala | 1962 | 1996 | 166,000 | 166,000 |
| The Guatemalan genocide was the massacre of Maya civilians during the Guatemalan Civil War (1960–1996) by successive US-backed Guatemalan military governments. Massacres, forced disappearances, torture and summary executions of guerrillas and especially civilians at the hands of security forces had been widespread since 1965, and was a longstanding policy of the military regime, which US officials were aware of. At least an estimated 200,000 persons died by arbitrary executions, forced disappearances and other human rights violations. 83% of those killed were Maya. A quarter of the direct victims of human rights violations and acts of violence were women. | | 40% of the Maya population (24,000 people) of Guatemala's Ixil and Rabinal regions were killed | | | |
| Tamil genocide | Sri Lanka | 1956 | 2009 | 154,022 | 253,818 |
| The Tamil genocide refers to the various systematic acts of physical violence and cultural destruction committed against the Tamil population in Sri Lanka during the Sinhala–Tamil ethnic conflict beginning in 1956, particularly during the Sri Lankan civil war. Various commenters have accused the Sri Lankan state of responsibility for and complicity in a genocide of Tamils, and point to state-sponsored settler colonialism, state-backed pogroms, and mass killings, enforced disappearances and sexual violence by the security forces as examples of genocidal acts. | | | | | |
| Population transfer in the Soviet Union | Soviet Union | 1941 | 1949 | 800,000 | 1,500,000. |
| Shortly before, during and immediately after World War II, the Soviet Union conducted a series of deportations on a huge scale. It is estimated that between 1941 and 1949 nearly 3.3 million people from different ethnic groups were deported to Siberia and the Central Asian republics. Many deportees died during the journey or due to the harsh climates of Siberia and Kazakhstan, disease, malnutrition, forced labor, and the lack of housing. It is disputed whether these deportations should be called ethnic cleansing, genocide, or something else. Some historians argue that the Soviet authorities acted with knowledge that the conditions deportees would face would lead to mass casualties. Others argue that no intent to exterminate the repressed people can be identified, and that the main motive of the Soviet authorities was to increase security in disputed border areas. Ethnic groups affected included: Soviet Germans: over 1 million deported in 1941–1942, 243,000 deaths; Crimean Tatars: at least 191,044 deported in 1944, 34,000 to 195,471 deaths; Chechens and Ingush: 100,000 deaths | | On average 25 to 35 percent | | | |
| Siege of Leningrad | Leningrad | 1941 | 1944 | 1,042,000 | 1,042,000 |
| Some historians and the Russian government have classified the siege, in which German and Finnish policies led to the deaths of more than 1 million civilians from starvation, as a genocide. | | | | | |
| The Holocaust | Nazi Germany and German-occupied Europe | 1941 | 1945 | 5,100,000 | 7,000,000 |
| The Holocaust was the genocide of European Jews during World War II. Between 1941 and 1945, Nazi Germany and its collaborators systematically murdered some six million Jews across German-occupied Europe, around two-thirds of Europe's Jewish population. Nearly one and half million were killed in just 100 days from late July to early November 1942, probably the fastest rate of genocidal killing in history. The murders were carried out primarily through mass shootings and poison gas in extermination camps. Separate Nazi persecutions killed a similar or larger number of non-Jewish civilians and POWs; the term Holocaust is sometimes used to refer to the persecution of these other groups. The Holocaust is considered to be the single largest genocide in history. | | Around 2/3 of the Jewish population of Europe. | | | |
| Genocide of Serbs and Holocaust in the Independent State of Croatia | Independent State of Croatia (now Croatia and Bosnia and Herzegovina) | 1941 | 1945 | 248,000 (Note: Total number of Serbs, Jews and Roma killed. Excluding the Jews sent to the German extermination camps.) | 548,000 |
| Genocide of Serbs and Holocaust of Jews and Romani within the Independent State of Croatia (NDH), a fascist puppet state that existed during World War II, led by the Ustaše regime, which ruled an occupied area of Yugoslavia. The Genocide of Serbs was conducted in parallel to the Holocaust in the NDH. The Ustaše were the only quisling forces in Yugoslavia who operated their own extermination camps for the purpose of murdering Serbs and other ethnic groups (Jews and Romani). | | | | | |
| Genocide of Bosniaks and Croats by the Chetniks | Yugoslavia | 1941 | 1945 | 47,000 | 68,000 |
| Genocidal massacres and ethnic cleansing of ethnic Muslims and Croats by Yugoslav royalists and nationalists Chetniks across large areas of Occupied Yugoslavia (modern-day Bosnia and Herzegovina, Croatia, Serbia) during World War II in Yugoslavia, on the basis of creating a post-war Greater Serbia. The Moljević plan ("On Our State and Its Borders") and the 1941 'Instructions' issued by Chetnik leader, Draža Mihailović, advocated for the cleansing of non-Serbs. Death toll by ethnicity is estimated to be between 18,000 and 32,000 Croats and between 29,000 and 33,000 Muslims. | | | | | |
| Nazi crimes against the Polish nation (part of the Generalplan Ost) | German-occupied Europe | 1939 | 1945 | 1,800,000 | 3,000,000 |
| Crimes against the Polish nation committed by Nazi Germany and Axis collaborationist forces during the invasion of Poland, along with auxiliary battalions during the subsequent occupation of Poland in World War II, included the genocide of millions of Polish people, especially the systematic extermination of Jewish Poles. (Note: Quote: "To conclude: the Germans committed genocide against the Polish population. The very term genocide comes from the 1944 book of the Polish-Jewish jurist Raphael Lemkin, whose study of Nazi-occupied Europe focused on the German attack on the Poles. Not only did the Nazis seek ultimately to eliminate the Polish nation 'as such', but they engaged in each of the acts identified by the 1949 Genocide Convention as signifiers of the 'intent to destroy'") These mass killings were enacted by the Nazis with further plans that were justified by their racial theories, which regarded Poles and other Slavs, and especially Jews, as racially inferior Untermenschen. | | From 6% to 10% (1.8 to 3 million) of the total Polish gentile population. In addition, 3 million Polish Jews were killed during the Holocaust in Poland (90% of Polish Jews). | | | |
| Romani Holocaust | German-occupied Europe | 1939 | 1945 | 130,000 | 1,500,000 |
| The Romani Holocaust was the planned effort by Nazi Germany and its World War II allies and collaborators to commit ethnic cleansing and eventually genocide against European Roma and Sinti peoples during the Holocaust era. A supplementary decree to the Nuremberg Laws issued on 26 November 1935 classified the Romani people as "enemies of the race-based state", thereby placing them in the same category as the Jews. Thus, the fate of the Roma in Europe paralleled that of the Jews in the Holocaust. | | 25% to 80% of Romani people in Europe killed | | | |
| Parsley massacre | Dominican Republic | 1937 | | 12,000 | 40,000 |
| The Parsley massacre was a mass killing of Haitians living in the Dominican Republic's northwestern frontier and in certain parts of the contiguous Cibao region in October 1937. Dominican Army troops from different areas of the country carried out the massacre on the orders of Dominican dictator Rafael Trujillo. Many died while trying to flee to Haiti across the Dajabón River that divides the two countries on the island; the troops followed them into the river to cut them down, causing the river to run with blood and corpses for several days. The massacre claimed the lives of an estimated 14,000 to 40,000 Haitian men, women, and children. Dominican troops interrogated thousands of civilians demanding that each victim say the word "parsley" (perejil). If the accused could not pronounce the word to the interrogators' satisfaction, they were deemed to be Haitians and killed. | | As a result of the massacre, virtually the entire Haitian population in the Dominican frontier was either killed or forced to flee across the border. | | | |
| Mass operations of the NKVD | Soviet Union | 1937 | 1938 | 247,157 | |
| During the Great Purge, people from certain ethnic groups were disproportionately represented as victims of arrest and execution. Although some historians have argued that the victims were targeted mostly because of their ethnicity, historian Andrey Savin writes that "the determinant factors in the choice of the majority of the victims of the national operations were, as a rule, the objective criteria of a "hostile" social past/origin and the subjective criteria of recurrent "anti-Soviet" behaviour". Multiple historians have published opinions describing the Polish operation as genocidal. 22% of the Polish population of the USSR was "sentenced" by the operation (140,000 people) The German operation of the NKVD has also been described as a genocide. | | | | | |
| Dersim massacre | Turkey | 1937 | 1938 | 13,806 | 70,000 |
| The Dersim massacre, also known as Dersim genocide, was carried out by the Turkish military over the course of three operations in the Dersim Province against Kurdish rebels of Alevi faith, and civilians in 1937 and 1938. Although most Kurds in Dersim remained in their home villages, thousands were killed and many others were expelled to other parts of Turkey. | | | | | |
| Holodomor | Ukraine and the northern Kuban, Soviet Union | 1932 | 1933 | 3,000,000 | 5,000,000 |
| The Holodomor also known as the Ukrainian Famine was a man-made famine in Soviet Ukraine from 1932 to 1933 that killed millions of Ukrainians. The Holodomor was part of the wider Soviet famine of 1930–1933 which affected the major grain-producing areas of the Soviet Union. While scholars are in consensus that the cause of the famine was man-made, whether or not the Holodomor was intentional and therefore constitutes a genocide under the Genocide Convention is debated by scholars. | | 10% of Ukraine's population Over 35% of Ukrainians in Kazakhstan | | | |
| Libyan genocide | Italian Libya | 1929 | 1932 | 83,000 | 125,000+ |
| The Libyan genocide was the genocide of Libyan Arabs and the systematic destruction of Libyan culture, particularly during and after the Second Italo-Senussi War between 1929 and 1934. During this period, between 83,000 and 125,000 Libyans were killed by Italian colonial authorities under Benito Mussolini. Italy committed major war crimes during the conflict; including the use of chemical weapons, executing surrendering combatants, and the mass executions of civilians. Italy apologized in 2008 for its killing, destruction and repression of the Libyan people during the period of colonial rule. | | 25% of Cyrenaican population Half of the nomadic Bedouin population | | | |
| Armenian genocide | Ottoman Empire (now Turkey, Syria, and Iraq) | 1915 | 1917 | 600,000 | 1,500,000 |
| The Armenian genocide, carried out by the Young Turks, included massacres, forced deportations involving death marches, and mass starvation. It occurred concurrently with the Assyrian and Greek genocides; some scholars consider these to form a broader genocide targeting all of the Christians in Anatolia. | | Approximately 90% of Armenians in the Ottoman Empire were killed or expelled. The share of Christians in area within Turkey's current borders declined from 20-22% in 1914, or about 3.3.–3.6 million people, to around 3% in 1927. | | | |
| Sayfo | Ottoman Empire (now Turkey, Syria and Iraq) | 1915 | 1919 | 200,000 | |
| The Sayfo (also known as the Seyfo or the Assyrian genocide) was the mass slaughter and deportation of Assyrian/Syriac Christians in southeastern Anatolia and Persia's Azerbaijan province by Ottoman forces and some Kurdish tribes during World War I. | | Overall, about 2 million Christians were killed in Anatolia between 1894 and 1924, 40 per cent of the original population. | | | |
| Greek genocide and Pontic genocide | Ottoman Empire (now Turkey) | 1914 | 1922 | 300,000 | 1,200,000 |
| The Greek genocide, which included the Pontic genocide, was the systematic killing of the Christian Ottoman Greek population of Anatolia which was carried out mainly during World War I and its aftermath (1914–1922) on the basis of their religion and ethnicity. It was perpetrated by the government of the Ottoman Empire led by the Three Pashas and by the Government of the Grand National Assembly led by Mustafa Kemal Atatürk, against the Greek population of the Empire. The genocide included massacres, forced deportations involving death marches through the Syrian Desert, expulsions, summary executions, and the destruction of Eastern Orthodox cultural, historical, and religious monuments. | | At least 25% of Greeks in Anatolia (Turkey) killed | | | |
| Herero and Nama genocide | German South West Africa (now Namibia) | 1904 | 1908 | 34,000 | 110,000 |
| The Genocide in German South West Africa was the campaign to exterminate the Herero and Nama people that the German Empire undertook in German South-West Africa (modern-day Namibia). It is considered one of the first genocides of the 20th century. | | 60% (24,000 out of 40,000) to 81.25% (65,000 out of 80,000) of total Herero and 50% of Nama population killed. | | | |
| Selknam genocide | Tierra del Fuego, Chile, Argentina | 1880 | 1910 | 2,500 | 4,000 |
| The Selknam genocide was the systematic extermination of the Selkʼnam people, an indigenous people of the Tierra del Fuego archipelago by a combination of European and South American hunters, ranchers, gold miners, and soldiers. Historians estimate that the Selkʼnam population fell from approximately 4,000 people during the 1880s to a few hundred by the early 1900s. | | 84% The genocide reduced their numbers from around 3,000 to about 500 people. | | | |
| Circassian genocide | Circassia, Russian Empire | 1864 (Note: Although ethnic cleansings and massacres began in the early 1800s, particularly under the command of the Tsarist Russian general Grigory Zass, the mass deportations, mass murders and extermination operations — where most deaths occurred — started in 1864.) | 1867 | 1,000,000 | 2,000,000 |
| The Circassian genocide was the Russian Empire's systematic mass murder, ethnic cleansing, and expulsion of the Circassian population, resulting in 1 to 1.5 million deaths (Note: "In the 1860s Russia killed 1.5 million Circassians, half of their population, and expelled the other half from their lands." Ahmed 2013, p. 357) during the final stages of the Russo-Circassian War. The peoples planned for extermination were mainly the Muslim Circassians, but other Muslim peoples of the Caucasus were also affected. Killing methods used by Russian forces during the genocide included impaling and tearing the bellies of pregnant women as means of intimidation of the Circassian population. Russian generals such as Grigory Zass described the Circassians as "subhuman filth", and glorified the mass murder of Circassian civilians, justified their use in scientific experiments, and allowed their soldiers to rape women. | | 95%–97% of total Circassian population killed or deported by the forces of Tsarist Russia. Only a small percentage who accepted to convert to Christianity, Russify and resettle within the Russian Empire were spared. The remaining Circassian populations who refused were thus forcefully dispersed, deported or killed. Today, most Circassians live in exile. | | | |
| Pacification of Algeria | French Algeria (now Algeria) | 1830 | 1875 | 500,000 | 1,000,000 |
| The pacification of Algeria, also known as the Algerian genocide, refers to violent military operations between 1830 and 1875 during the French conquest of Algeria by the French Empire, that involved ethnic cleansing, massacres and forced displacement aimed at repressing various tribal rebellions by the native Algerian population. | | 16-33% of Algerians were killed | | | |
| California genocide | California, United States | 1846 | 1873 | 9,492–16,094 (Note: Only the range of deaths caused by massacres) | 120,000 (Note: The total population decline of the period overall) |
| The California genocide was a series of systematized killings of thousands of Indigenous peoples of California by United States government agents and private citizens in the 19th century. It began following the American Conquest of California from Mexico, and the influx of settlers due to the California Gold Rush, which accelerated the decline of the Indigenous population of California. Between 1846 and 1873, it is estimated that non-Natives killed between 9,492 and 16,094 California Natives. In addition, between several hundred and several thousand California Natives were starved or worked to death. Acts of enslavement, kidnapping, rape, child separation and forced displacement were widespread. These acts were encouraged, tolerated, and carried out by state authorities and private militias. | | Amerindian population in California declined by 80% during the period | | | |
| Queensland Aboriginal genocide | Queensland | 1840 | 1897 | 10,000 | 65,180 |
| Queensland represents the single bloodiest colonial frontier in Australia. Thus the records of Queensland document the most frequent reports of shootings and massacres of indigenous people, the three deadliest massacres on white settlers, the most disreputable frontier police force, and the highest number of white victims to frontier violence on record in any Australian colony. Thus some sources have characterized these events as a Queensland Aboriginal genocide. | | 3.3% to over 50% of the aboriginal population was killed (10,000 to 65,180 killed out of 125,600) | | | |
| Moriori genocide | Chatham Islands, New Zealand | 1835 | 1863 | 1,900 | 1,900 |
| The genocide of the Moriori began in 1836. The invasion of the Chatham Islands by New Zealand Maori left the Moriori people and their culture to die off. Those who survived were kept as slaves and were not sanctioned to marry other Moriori or have children within their race. This caused their people and their language to be endangered. According to Moriori elders, a total of 1,561 Moriori died between the invasion in 1835 and the end of the group's slavery in 1863, with others dying of diseases transmitted by Europeans. The Moriori population was reduced from 2,000 to only 101 in 1863. | | 95% of the Moriori population was eradicated by the invasion from Taranaki, a group of people from the Ngāti Mutunga and Ngāti Tama iwi. All were enslaved and many were cannibalized. The Moriori language is now extinct. | | | |
| Genocide of Yazidis by the Soran Emirate | Shekhan, Sinjar and Erbil, Ottoman Empire (present-day Iraq) | 1832 | 1834 | 70,000 | 135,000 |
| The Genocide of Yazidis by the Soran Emirate, also known in Yazidi tradition as the Firman of Mir-i-Kura, was a genocidal campaign led by the Sunni Kurdish emir Mir Muhammad of Rawanduz against the Yazidis of Sheikhan, Sinjar, and Erbil, triggered by a fatwa declaring Yazidis apostates and resulting in mass killing, enslavement, and forced conversion. | | The historian Sadiq al-Damlouji estimated that approximately 5% of the targeted Yazidi population survived the campaign. | | | |
| Trail of Tears | Southeastern United States | 1830 | 1850 | 12,000 | 16,000 |
| The Trail of Tears was the forced displacement of approximately 60,000 people of the "Five Civilized Tribes" between 1830 and 1850, and the additional thousands of Native Americans within that were ethnically cleansed by the United States government. A variety of scholars have classified the Trail of Tears as either a genocide in and of itself, (Note: Genocide education scholar Thomas Keefe – "The preparation (Stage 7) for genocide, specifically the transfer of population that "Deliberately inflicting on the group conditions of life calculated to bring about its physical destruction in whole or in part" as stated in Article II of the UNCPPCG is clear in the Trail of Tears and other deportations of Native American populations from land seized for the benefit of European-American populations."; Muscogee Nation Historic and Cultural Preservation Manager Rae Lynn Butler – "really was about extinguishing a race of people"; Archivist at the Cherokee Heritage Center Jerrid Miller – "The Trail of Tears was outright genocide".; Sociologist and historian Vahakn Dadrian lists the expulsion of the Cherokee as an example of utilitarian genocide, stating "the expulsion and decimation of the Cherokee Indians from the territories of the State of Georgia is symbolic of the pattern of perpetration inflicted upon the American Indian by Whites in North America."; Genocide scholar Adam Jones – "Forced relocations of Indian populations often took the form of genocidal death marches, most infamously the "Trails of Tears" of the Cherokee and Navajo nations, which killed between 20 and 40 per cent of the targeted populations en route. The barren "tribal reservations" to which survivors were consigned exacted their own grievous toll through malnutrition and disease."; Cherokee politician Bill John Baker – "this ruthless [Indian Removal Act] policy subjected 46,000 Indians—to a forced migration under punishing conditions […] amounted to genocide, the ethnic cleansing of men, women and children, motivated by racial hatred and greed, and carried out through sadism and violence."; Sociologist James V. Fenelon and historian Clifford E. Trafzer – "Instead the national government and its leaders have offered a systemic denial of genocide, the occurrence of which would be contrary to the principles of a democratic and just society. "Denial of massive death counts is common among those whose forefathers were the perpetrators of the genocide" (Stannard, 1992, p. 152) with motives of protecting "the moral reputations of those people and that country responsible," including some scholars. It took 50 years of scholarly debate for the academy to recognize well-documented genocides of the Indian removals in the 1830s, including the Cherokee Trail of Tears, as with other nations of the "Five Civilized" southeastern tribes.") or as a genocidal act within the broader genocide of Native Americans. (Note: Political scientist Michael Rogin – "To face responsibility for specific killings might have led to efforts to stop it; to avoid individual deaths turned Indian removal into a theory of genocide."; Indigenous studies scholar Nicky Michael and historian Beverly Jean Smith – "Over one-fourth died on the forced death marches of the 1830s. By any United Nations standard, these actions can be equated with genocide and ethnic cleansing."; Historian Jim Piecuch argues that the Trail of Tears constitutes one tool in the genocide of Native Americans over the three centuries since the beginning of colonization in north America.; Political scientist Andrew R. Basso – "The Cherokee Trail of Tears should be understood within the context of colonial genocide in the Americas. This is yet another chapter of colonial forces acting against an indigenous group in order to secure rich and fertile lands, resources, and living spaces."; Political scientist Barbara Harff – "One of the most enduring and abhorrent problems of the world is genocide, which is neither particular to a specific race, class, or nation, nor rooted in any one ethnocentric view of the world. […] Often democratic institutions are cited as safeguards against mass excesses. In view of the treatment of Amerindians by agents of the U.S. government, this view is unwarranted. For example, the thousands of Cherokees who died during the Trail of Tears (Cherokee Indians were forced to march in 1838–1839 from Appalachia to Oklahoma) testify that even a democratic system may tum against its people."; Legal scholar Rennard Strickland – "There were, of course, great and tragic Indian massacres and bitter exoduses, illegal even under the laws of war. We know these acts of genocide by place names – Sand Creek, the Battle of Washita, Wounded Knee – and by their tragic poetic codes – the Trail of Tears, the Long Walk, the Cheyenne Autumn. But ... genocidal objectives have been carried out under color of law – in de Tocqueville's phrase, "legally, philanthropically, without shedding blood, and without violating a single great principle of morality in the eyes of the word." These were legally enacted policies whereby a way of life, a culture, was deliberately obliterated. As the great Indian orator Dragging Canoe concluded, "Whole Indian Nations have melted away like balls of snow in the sun leaving scarcely a name except as imperfectly recorded by their destroyers"."; Legal scholars Christopher Turner and Mary Ellen Turpel-Lafond reiterate Strickland's assessment.; Attorney Maria Conversa – "The theft of ancestral tribal lands, the genocide of tribal members, public hostility towards Native peoples, and irreversible oppression--these are the realities that every indigenous person has had to face because of colonization. By recognizing and respecting the Muscogee Creek Nation's authority to criminally sentence its own members, the United States Supreme Court could have taken a small step towards righting these wrongs."; Historian David Stannard and ethnic studies scholar Ward Churchill have both identified the trail of tears as part of the United States history of genocidal actions against indigenous nations.; Sociologist Benjamin P. Bowser, psychologist Carol O. Word, and Kate Shaw – "There was a pattern to Indian genocide. One-by-one, each Native state was defeated militarily; successive Native generations fought and were defeated as well. As settlers became more numerous and stronger militarily, Indians became fewer and weaker militarily. In one Indian nation after the other, resistance eventually collapsed due to the death toll from violence. Then, survivors were displaced from their ancestral lands, which had sustained them for generations. […] Starting in 1830, surviving Native people, mostly Cherokee, in the Eastern US were ordered by President Andrew Jackson to march up to two thousand miles and to cross the Mississippi River to settle in Oklahoma. Thousands died on the Trail of Tears. This pattern of defeat, displacement, and victimization repeated itself in the American West. From this history, Native Americans were victims of all five Lemkin specified genocidal acts."; Sociologist and psychologist Laurence French wrote that the trail of tears was at least a campaign of cultural genocide.; Cultural studies scholar Melissa Slocum – "Rarely is the conversation about the impact of genocide on today's generations or the overall steps that lead to genocide. As well, most curricula in the education system, from kindergarten up through to college, does not discuss in detail American Indian genocide beyond possibly a quick one-day mention of the Cherokee Trail of Tears."; English and literary scholar Thir Bahadur Budhathoki – "On the basis of the basic concept of genocide as propounded by Rephael Lemkin, the definitions of the UN Convention and other genocide scholars, sociological perspective of genocide-modernity nexus and the philosophical understanding of such crime as an evil in its worst possible form, the fictional representation of the entire process of Cherokee removal including its antecedents and consequences represented in these novels, is genocidal in nature. However, the American government, that mostly represents the perpetrators of the process, and the Euro-American culture of the United States considered as the mainstream culture, have not acknowledged the Native American tragedy as genocide.") | | Figures for the number of deaths per Native American group that was forcibly relocated can be found at Trail of Tears § Statistics. | | | |
| Black War (genocide of Aboriginal Tasmanians) | Van Diemen's Land (Tasmania) | 1825 | 1832 | 400 | 1,000 |
| The extinction of Aboriginal Tasmanians at the hands of British colonists was called an archetypal case of genocide by Rafael Lemkin among other historians, a view supported by more recent genocide scholars like Ben Kiernan who covered it in his book Blood and Soil: A History of Genocide and Extermination from Sparta to Darfur. This extinction also includes the Black War, which would make the war an act of genocide. Historians like Keith Windschuttle among other historians disagree with this interpretation in discourse known as the History wars. | | ~100% | | | |
| 1804 Haitian massacre | Haiti | 1804 | | 3,000 | 5,000 |
| The 1804 Haitian massacre is considered to be a genocide by some scholars, as it was intended to destroy the Franco-Haitian population following the Haitian Revolution. The massacre was ordered by King Jean-Jacques Dessalines to remove the remainder of the white population from Haiti, and lasted from January to 22 April 1804. During the massacre, entire families were tortured and killed, and by the end of it, Haiti's white population was virtually non-existent. | | | | | |
| Cape San genocide | Dutch Cape Colony and British Cape Colony (modern day South Africa) | 1760s–90s (Note: Variously specified as 1770, "c. 1770" or 1795)) | 1828–1880 (Note: Variously specified as 1828, 1830, or 1880.) | | |
| The Cape San people were subjected to massacres known as "Bushmen hunting" land expropriation, forced labor, and child abduction at the hands of Dutch settlers and the paramilitary groups that they formed, leading to "the virtual extinction of the Cape San peoples". | | | | | |
| Dzungar genocide | Dzungaria, Qing dynasty China | 1755 | 1758 | 480,000 | 600,000 |
| The Dzungar genocide was the mass extermination of the Mongol Dzungar people by the Qing dynasty. The Qianlong Emperor ordered the genocide after the rebellion in 1755 by Dzungar leader Amursana against Qing rule, after the dynasty first conquered the Dzungar Khanate with Amursana's support. The genocide was perpetrated by Manchu generals of the Qing army, supported by Turkic oasis dwellers (now known as Uyghurs) who rebelled against Dzungar rule. | | 80% of 600,000 Zungharian Oirats killed (Note: In an account of the war, Wei Yuan wrote that about 40% of the Dzungar households were killed by smallpox, 20% fled to Russia or the Kazakh Khanate, and 30% were killed by the army, leaving no yurts in an area of several thousands of Chinese miles except those of the surrendered. Clarke wrote 80%, or between 480,000 and 600,000 people, were killed between 1755 and 1758 in what "amounted to the complete destruction of not only the Zunghar state but of the Zunghars as a people." Historian Peter Perdue has shown that the extermination of the Dzungars was the result of an explicit policy of extermination launched by the Qianlong Emperor. Although this "deliberate use of massacre" has been largely ignored by modern scholars, Mark Levene, a historian whose recent research interests focus on genocide, has stated that the extermination of the Dzungars was "arguably the eighteenth century genocide par excellence".) | | | |
| Iroquois Wars | North America | 1640 | 1763 | | |
| As part of the broader Beaver Wars, among the Indigenous peoples in Canada, the Iroquois conducted a genocidal war against the Huron people and other Iroquoian and non-Iroquoian peoples. Settlements were burned, and of the 30,000 Hurons, a few thousand were able to flee and avoid becoming victims of the ethnic genocide. Ned Blackhawk, in analysing the war between the Iroquois and Huron, found that the Iroquois committed all five acts described in the 1948 Genocide Convention. | | | | | |
| Dutch conquest of the Banda Islands | Banda Islands (now Indonesia) | 1620 | 1621 | 3000 | 4000 |
| The Dutch conquest of the Banda Islands is widely considered to have amounted to genocide. Following Bandanese Islanders' refusal to abide by treaties to sell nutmeg and mace exclusively to the VOC for less in exchange, Jan Pieterszoon Coen led a campaign to depopulate the islands through a combination of massacres and starvation, with some Bandanese taken as prisoners. Many drowned attempting to flee. The VOC subsequently imported enslaved peoples to work on their plantations. | | Estimated that 23% were killed or starved, 13% taken prisoner, 34% fled, and 30% drowned. | | | |
| Taíno genocide | Hispaniola | 1492 | 1514 | 68,000 | 968,000 |
| The Taíno genocide refers to the extermination of the indigenous population of Hispaniola due to forced labour and exploitation by the Spanish. Andrés Reséndez argues that even though disease was a factor, the native population would have rebounded the same way Europeans did during the Black Death if it were not for their constant enslavement in the island's gold and silver mines. According to anthropologist Jason Hickel, a third of Arawak workers died every six months from lethal forced labour in the mines. | | 68% to over 96% of the Taíno population perished under Spanish rule. | | | |
| Albigensian Crusade (Cathar genocide) | Languedoc (now France) | 1209 | 1229 | 200,000 | 1,000,000 |
| The Albigensian Crusade was a 20-year military campaign initiated by Pope Innocent III to eliminate Catharism, a Christian sect, in Languedoc, in southern France. The Catholic Church considered them heretics and ordered that they should be completely eradicated. Raphael Lemkin referred to the Albigensian Crusade as "one of the most conclusive cases of genocide in religious history". Kurt Jonassohn and Karin Solveig Björnson describe it as "the first ideological genocide." | | | | | |

== See also ==
- Casualty recording
- Democide
- Denial of genocides of Indigenous peoples
- Genocidal massacre
- Genocide of indigenous peoples
- Genocides in history
- Hamoodur Rahman Commission
- List of convicted war criminals
- List of ethnic cleansing campaigns
- List of ongoing armed conflicts
- List of people indicted in the International Criminal Court
- List of war crimes
- List of wars by death toll

=== Political extermination campaigns ===
- Anti-communist mass killings
- Dirty War
- Indonesian mass killings of 1965–66
- Mass killings of landlords under Mao Zedong (1949–1951)
- Mass killings under communist regimes
- Operation Condor
- Red Terror (Ethiopia)
- White Terror (Spain)

== Bibliography ==
- Ahmed, Akbar (2013). The Thistle and the Drone: How America's War on Terror Became a Global War on Tribal Islam. Washington, D.C., USA: Brookings Institution Press. ISBN 978-0-8157-2378-3.
- Albanese, Francesca (25 March 2024). Anatomy of a Genocide: Report of the Special Rapporteur on the situation of human rights in the Palestinian territories occupied since 1967, Francesca Albanese (PDF) (Report). United Nations Special Rapporteur on the occupied Palestinian territories. Archived (PDF) from the original on 28 January 2025.
- 'You Feel Like You Are Subhuman': Israel's Genocide Against Palestinians In Gaza (PDF) (Report). Amnesty International. 2024. Archived (PDF) from the original on 5 December 2024.
- Asi, Yara M. (19 August 2025). "The Growing Consensus over Israel's Genocide in Gaza". Arab Center Washington DC.
- Bachman, Jeffrey (2021b). "Genocide and Imperialism". The Palgrave Encyclopedia of Imperialism and Anti-Imperialism. Springer International Publishing. pp. 1012–1022. ISBN 978-3-030-29901-9.
- Bachman, Jeffrey S. (2022). The Politics of Genocide: From the Genocide Convention to the Responsibility to Protect. Rutgers University Press. ISBN 978-1-9788-2147-7.
- Banki, Judith Herschcopf; Pawlikowski, John (2001). Ethics in the Shadow of the Holocaust: Christian and Jewish Perspectives. Rowman & Littlefield. ISBN 978-1-58051-109-4 – via Google Books.
- Bass, Gary J. (2013a). The Blood Telegram: Nixon, Kissinger, and a Forgotten Genocide. Knopf Doubleday Publishing Group. ISBN 978-0-385-35047-1.
- Bayoumi, Moustafa (6 July 2025). "The destruction of Palestine is breaking the world". The Guardian. ISSN 0261-3077. Archived from the original on 27 July 2025.
- van den Berg, Stephanie (1 September 2025). "Israel is committing genocide in Gaza, scholars' association says". Reuters.
- Blick, Jeremy P. (3 August 2010). "The Iroquois practice of genocidal warfare (1534-1787)". Journal of Genocide Research. 3 (3): 405–429. doi:10.1080/14623520120097215. S2CID 71358963.
- Bloxham, Donald; Moses, A. Dirk, eds. (2010). The Oxford Handbook of Genocide Studies. Oxford, England: Oxford University Press. ISBN 978-0-19-923211-6.
- B'Tselem (July 2025). Our Genocide (PDF) (Report). Archived (PDF) from the original on 30 July 2025.
- Burga, Solcyré (13 November 2023). "Is What's Happening in Gaza a Genocide? Experts Weigh In". Time. Archived from the original on 25 November 2023.
- "The tragedy of the armed confrontation". Guatemala: Memory of Silence (PDF) (Report). Guatemalan Commission for Historical Clarification. 1999. Archived from the original on 15 January 2003.
- Chapman, Anne (2010). European Encounters with the Yamana People of Cape Horn, Before and After Darwin (1st ed.). Cambridge University Press. ISBN 978-0-521-51379-1.
- Clarke, Michael Edmund (2004). In the Eye of Power (PDF) (doctoral thesis). Brisbane: Griffith University. Archived from the original (PDF) on 29 February 2012.
- Clements, Nicholas (2013). Frontier Conflict in Van Diemen's Land (PhD thesis) (PDF) (Thesis). University of Tasmania.
- Clements, Nicholas (2014). The Black War. Brisbane: University of Queensland Press. ISBN 978-0-70225-006-4.
- Condon, Grace; Condon, Frankie (20 February 2024) [4 February 2024]. "Genocide is Never Justifiable: Israel and Hamas in Gaza". Genocide Watch. Archived from the original on 25 August 2025.
- Corder, Mike (2 January 2024). "South Africa's genocide case against Israel sets up a high-stakes legal battle at the UN's top court". ABC News. Archived from the original on 7 January 2024.
- Curthoys, Ann; Docker, John (2008). "Defining Genocide". In Stone, Dan (ed.). The Historiography of Genocide. Palgrave Macmillan. pp. 9–41. ISBN 978-0-230-29778-4.
- DeMello, Margo (2013). Body Studies: An Introduction. Routledge. ISBN 978-0-415-69930-3.
- Dumper, Michael; Badran, Amneh (2024). "Introduction". In Dumper, Michael; Badran, Amneh (eds.). Routledge Handbook on Palestine (1st ed.). Routledge. doi:10.4324/9781003031994. ISBN 9781003031994.
- Duggan, Christopher (2007). The Force of Destiny: A History of Italy Since 1796. New York: Houghton Mifflin.
- Elhag, Hussein Adam (2014). "Energy development and transportation". In Ali, Hamid Eltgani (ed.). Darfur's Political Economy: A Quest for Development. Routledge. p. 210. ISBN 978-1-85743-711-9 – via Google Books.
- Ellman, Michael (June 2007). "Stalin and the Soviet famine of 1932 – 33 Revisited". Europe-Asia Studies. 59 (4). Routledge: 663–693. doi:10.1080/09668130701291899. S2CID 53655536.
- Etcheson, Craig (2005). After the Killing Fields: Lessons from the Cambodian Genocide. Greenwood. ISBN 978-0-275-98513-4.
- Fernando, Jude Lal (2014). "The Politics of Representations of Mass Atrocity in Sri Lanka and Human Rights Discourse: Challenges to Justice and Recovery". In Admirand, Peter (ed.). Loss and Hope: Global, Interreligious and Interdisciplinary Perspectives. A&C Black. pp. 28–35. ISBN 978-1-4725-2907-7.
- ——— (2020) [1999]. Historical Dictionary of the Holocaust (Third ed.). Lanham, MD: Rowman & Littlefield. ISBN 978-1-5381-3015-5.
- Fisher, Alan W. (2014). Crimean Tatars. Stanford, California: Hoover Press. ISBN 978-0-8179-6663-8. LCCN 76041085. OCLC 946788279.
- Frey, Rebecca Joyce (2009). Genocide and International Justice. Facts On File. ISBN 978-0-8160-7310-8.
- Friedrichsmeyer, Sara L.; Lennox, Sara; Zantop, Susanne M. (1998). The Imperialist Imagination: German Colonialism and Its Legacy. University of Michigan Press. ISBN 978-0-472-09682-4.
- Gardini, Walter (1984). "Restoring the Honour of an Indian Tribe-Rescate de una tribu". Anthropos. 79 (4/6): 645–647. JSTOR 40461884.
- Geiger, Vladimir Geiger [in Croatian] (2012). "Human losses of Croats in World War II and the immediate post-war period caused by the Chetniks (Yugoslav Army in the Fatherland) and the Partizans (People's Liberation Army and the partizan detachment of Yugoslavia/Yugoslav Army) and the Yugoslav Communist authoritities. Numerical indicators". Revue für Kroatische Geschichte = Revue d'Histoire Croate. VIII (1): 77–121. Archived from the original on 26 March 2023.
- Genel Komite, HDP (2014). "The Circassian Genocide". HDP. Archived from the original on 18 October 2023.
- Gigoux, Carlos (2022). ""Condemned to Disappear": Indigenous Genocide in Tierra del Fuego" (PDF). Journal of Genocide Research. 24 (1): 1–22. doi:10.1080/14623528.2020.1853359. Archived from the original (PDF) on 3 June 2024.
- Girard, Philippe R. (2011). The Slaves Who Defeated Napoleon: Toussaint Louverture and the Haitian War of Independence 1801–1804. Tuscaloosa, Alabama: The University of Alabama Press. ISBN 978-0-8173-1732-4.
- Grieb, Christiane (2014). "War Crimes, Soviet, World War II". In C. Dowling, Timothy (ed.). Russia at War: From the Mongol Conquest to Afghanistan, Chechnya, and Beyond. ABC-CLIO. ISBN 978-1-59884-948-6. LCCN 2014017775.
- Gritten, David (14 March 2025). "UN experts accuse Israel of genocidal acts and sexual violence in Gaza". BBC News. Archived from the original on 15 March 2025.
- Gushee, David P. (1 December 2012). "Desecrations: Twentieth-Century Nazi Assaults on Human Life". The Sacredness of Human Life: Why an Ancient Biblical Vision Is Key to the Key to the World's Future. Wm. B. Eerdmans Publishing. pp. 313–314. ISBN 978-0-8028-4420-0.
- Gutman, Roy (1993). A Witness to Genocide. Lisa Drew Books. ISBN 978-0-02-032995-4.
- "Part 5: Chapter 2, paragraph 33". Hamoodur Rahman Commission Report. 1974. Archived from the original on 16 August 2016.
- Harambour, Alberto (2019a). "'There Cannot be Civilization and Barbarism on the Island': Civilian-driven Violence and the Genocide of the Selkʼnam People of Tierra del Fuego". In Adhikari, Mohamed (ed.). Civilian-Driven Violence and the Genocide of Indigenous Peoples in Settler Societies. Routledge. pp. 165–187. doi:10.4324/9781003015550-7. ISBN 978-1-003-01555-0. Archived from the original on 21 November 2023.
- Heuveline, Patrick (1998). "'Between One and Three Million': Towards the Demographic Reconstruction of a Decade of Cambodian History (1970–79)". Population Studies. 52 (1): 49–65. doi:10.1080/0032472031000150176. JSTOR 2584763. PMID 11619945.
- Heuveline, Patrick (2001). "The Demographic Analysis of Mortality in Cambodia". In Reed, Holly E.; Keely, Charles B. (eds.). Forced Migration and Mortality. Washington, DC: National Academy Press.
- Hickel, Jason (2018). The Divide: A Brief Guide to Global Inequality and its Solutions. Windmill Books. ISBN 978-1-78609-003-4.
- Hiltermann, Joost (2008). "The 1988 Anfal Campaign in Iraqi Kurdistan". Mass Violence & Resistance. Sciences Po.
- Hoffmann, Anette (2007). Baronian, Marie-Aude; Besser, Stephan; Jansen, Yolande (eds.). Diaspora and Memory: Figures of Displacement in Contemporary Literature, Arts and Politics. Amsterdam: Rodopi. ISBN 978-90-420-2129-7 – via Google Books.
- "Circassian Genocide on its 159th Anniversary". Human Rights Association. 21 May 2023. Archived from the original on 22 August 2023.
- "One year of denouncing the genocide of Palestinians in Gaza". International Federation for Human Rights. 12 December 2024.
- Irvin-Erickson, Douglas (2023). "The history of Raphael Lemkin and the UN Genocide Convention". In Simon, David J.; Kahn, Leora (eds.). Handbook of Genocide Studies. Edward Elgar Publishing. pp. 7–26. ISBN 978-1-80037-934-3.
- Irwin, Rachel (13 December 2012). "Genocide Conviction for Serb General Tolimir". Institute for War and Peace Reporting. Archived from the original on 27 December 2023.
- Jahan, Rounaq (2013). "Genocide in Bangladesh". In Totten, Samuel; Parsons, William Spencer (eds.). Centuries of Genocide: Essays and Eyewitness Accounts. Routledge. ISBN 978-0-415-87191-4 – via Google Books.
- Jones, Adam (2010) [2006]. "The conquest of the Americas". Genocide: A Comprehensive Introduction (revised ed.). London: Routledge. ISBN 978-0-203-84696-4. OCLC 672333335.
- Jones, Adam (2016). Genocide: A Comprehensive Introduction. Routledge. ISBN 978-1-317-53386-3 – via Google Books.
- Kiernan, Ben (2023). "General Editor's Introduction to the Series: Genocide: Its Causes, Components, Connections and Continuing Challenges". In Kiernan, Ben; Lemos, T. M.; Taylor, Tristan S. (eds.). The Cambridge World History of Genocide. Vol. I: Genocide in the Ancient, Medieval and Premodern Worlds. Cambridge University Press. pp. 1–30. ISBN 978-1-108-64034-3.
- King, Charles (2008). The Ghost of Freedom: A History of the Caucasus. New York: Oxford University Press. ISBN 978-0-19-517775-6.
- Kirmanj, Sherko; Rafaat, Aram (2021). "The Kurdish genocide in Iraq: the Security-Anfal and the Identity-Anfal". National Identities. 23 (2): 163–183. Bibcode:2021NatId..23..163K. doi:10.1080/14608944.2020.1746250.
- Kottasová, Ivana; Salman, Abeer (28 July 2025). "For first time, two leading Israeli human rights groups accuse Israel of genocide in Gaza". CNN. Archived from the original on 28 July 2025.
- Kulesza, Witold (2004). "Zbrodnie Wehrmachtu w Polsce – Wrzesien 1939" [Wehrmacht's crimes in Poland – September 1939]. Bulletin of the Institute of National Remembrance (in Polish). No. 8–09. pp. 19–30. Archived from the original (PDF) on 3 June 2013. "...w tych przypadkach, w których polska ludnosc cywilna podjela walke z Wehrmachtem, lecz ujeta przez wroga mordowana byla w egzekucjach poza sama walka, stawala sie ofiara oczywistych zbrodni wojennych. Konstatacja ta opiera sie takze na art. 6 statutu Miedzynarodowego Trybunalu Wojskowego w Norymberdze z 8 sierpnia 1945 r., który w punkcie b jako postaci zbrodni wojennych wskazuje pogwalcenie praw i zwyczajów wojennych przez morderstwa ludnosci cywilnej i jenców wojennych, a takze zabijanie zakladników oraz rozmyslne i bezcelowe burzenie miast, osad i wsi lub niszczenie nieusprawiedliwione wojskowa koniecznoscia."
- van Laarhoven, Kasper; Peek, Eva; Walters, Derk (14 May 2025). "Zeven gerenommeerde wetenschappers vrijwel eensgezind: Israël pleegt in Gaza genocide". NRC (in Dutch). Archived from the original on 15 May 2025.
- Lattimore, Owen (1950). Pivot of Asia; Sinkiang and the inner Asian frontiers of China and Russia. Little, Brown Book Group.
- Lawless, Jill (12 July 2024). "Senior UK jurists have joined calls to stop arms sales to Israel. Other allies face similar pressure". Associated Press. Archived from the original on 26 July 2024.
- Legters, Lyman H. (1992). "The American Genocide". In Lyden, Fremont J. (ed.). Native Americans and Public Policy. Pittsburgh: University of Pittsburgh Press. ISBN 978-0-8229-7682-0. OCLC 555693841 – via Google Books.
- Levene, Mark (2005). "6: Declining Powers". Genocide in the Age of the Nation-State. Vol. II: The Rise of the West and the Coming of Genocide. 175 Fifth Avenue, New York NY 10010. ISBN 1-84511-057-9.
- "Gaza genocide". Médecins Sans Frontières. 10 July 2025. Archived from the original on 10 July 2025.
- Mohyeldin, Ayman; Hamdan, Basel (10 December 2024). "Why Amnesty International and other experts say Israel is committing genocide in Gaza". MSNBC. Archived from the original on 3 July 2025.
- Morris, Benny; Ze'evi, Dror (2019). The Thirty-Year Genocide: Turkey's Destruction of Its Christian Minorities, 1894–1924. Harvard University Press. ISBN 978-0-674-91645-6.
- Moses, A. Dirk (2008). Empire, Colony, Genocide: Conquest, Occupation, and Subaltern Resistance in World History. Berghahn Books. ISBN 978-1-84545-452-4 – via Google Books.
- Murphy, Francois (10 June 2025). "Israel commits 'extermination' in Gaza by killing in schools, UN experts say". Reuters.
- Naimark, Norman M. (2010). Stalin's Genocides. Human Rights and Crimes against Humanity. Vol. 12. Princeton, NJ: Princeton University Press. ISBN 978-0-691-14784-0 – via Google Books.
- Narea, Nicole (25 October 2024). "Is Israel committing genocide? Reexamining the question, a year later". Vox.
- Nashed, Mat (5 May 2025). "How RSF is adopting Israel's 'template for genocide' in Sudan". Al Jazeera. Archived from the original on 6 May 2025.
- Nuhn, Walter (1989). Sturm über Südwest. Der Hereroaufstand von 1904 [Storm over Southwest. The Herero Rebellion of 1904] (in German). Koblenz: Bernard & Graefe. ISBN 978-3-7637-5852-4.
- Ohayon, Isabelle (13 January 2016). "The Kazakh Famine: The Beginnings of Sedentarization". Archived from the original on 29 May 2019.
- Ørsted-Jensen, Robert (2011). Frontier History Revisited – Queensland and the 'History War'. Coorparoo, Brisbane, Qld: Lux Mundi Publishing. ISBN 978-1-4663-8682-2.
- Ozoráková, Lilla (2022). "The Road to Finding a Definition for the Crime of Genocide – the Importance of the Genocide Convention". The Law & Practice of International Courts and Tribunals. 21 (2): 278–301. doi:10.1163/15718034-12341475. ISSN 1569-1853.
- Perdue, Peter C. (2005). China Marches West: The Qing Conquest of Central Eurasia. Harvard University Press. ISBN 978-0-674-01684-2 – via Google Books.
- Pohl, Jonathan Otto (2022). The Years of Great Silence: The Deportation, Special Settlement, and Mobilization into the Labor Army of Ethnic Germans in the USSR, 1941–1955. ibidem. ISBN 978-3-8382-1630-0.
- Quigley, John (3 July 2024). "The Lancet and Genocide By 'Slow Death' in Gaza". Arab Center Washington DC. Archived from the original on 13 July 2024.
- Ray, Leslie (2007). Language of the Land: The Mapuche in Argentina and Chile. Copenhagen: IWGIA (International Work Group for Indigenous Affairs). ISBN 978-87-91563-37-9 – via Google Books.
- Reséndez, Andrés (2016). The Other Slavery: The Uncovered Story of Indian Enslavement in America. Houghton Mifflin Harcourt. ISBN 978-0-547-64098-3 – via Google Books.
- Richmond, Walter (2013). The Circassian Genocide. Rutgers University Press. ISBN 978-0-8135-6069-4 – via Google Books.
- Sarkin-Hughes, Jeremy (2008). Colonial Genocide and Reparations Claims in the 21st Century: The Socio-Legal Context of Claims under International Law by the Herero against Germany for Genocide in Namibia, 1904–1908. Westport, Conn.: Praeger Security International. ISBN 978-0-313-36256-9.
- Schabas, William A. (2010). "The Law and Genocide". In Bloxham, Donald; Moses, A. Dirk (eds.). The Oxford Handbook of Genocide Studies. Oxford University Press. pp. 123–141. ISBN 978-0-19-161361-6.
- Schaller, Dominik J. (2008). From Conquest to Genocide: Colonial Rule in German Southwest Africa and German East Africa. NY: Berghahn Books. ISBN 978-1-8454-5452-4.
- Semerdjian, Elyse (24 January 2024). "A World Without Civilians". Journal of Genocide Research. 28: 32–37. doi:10.1080/14623528.2024.2306714.
- Shaw, Martin (19 September 2025). "The Genocide that Changed the World". Journal of Genocide Research. 28 (Roundtable: Gaza and Genocide Studies): 588–602. doi:10.1080/14623528.2025.2556575. hdl:10230/71505.
- Shawcross, William (1985). The Quality of Mercy: Cambodia, Holocaust, and Modern Conscience. Simon & Schuster. ISBN 978-0-233-97691-4.
- Shenfield, Stephen D. (1999). "The Circassians: A Forgotten Genocide". In Levene, Mark; Roberts, Penny (eds.). The Massacre in History. Berghahn Books.
- Short, Damien, ed. (2016). Redefining Genocide: Settler Colonialism, Social Death and Ecocide. London, UK: Zed Books. ISBN 978-1-84277-930-9.
- Speri, Alice (20 December 2024). "Defining genocide: how a rift over Gaza sparked a crisis among scholars". The Guardian. Archived from the original on 21 December 2024.
- Sultany, Nimer (9 May 2024). "A Threshold Crossed: On Genocidal Intent and the Duty to Prevent Genocide in Palestine". Journal of Genocide Research (Forum: Gaza: International Humanitarian Law and Genocide): 1–26. doi:10.1080/14623528.2024.2351261.
- Swart, Mia (5 August 2025). "South Africa v Israel: South Africa's case at the International Court of Justice". The Round Table: The Commonwealth Journal of International Affairs and Policy Studies. 114 (5): 687–689. doi:10.1080/00358533.2025.2542794.
- Terry, Fiona (2002). Condemned to Repeat?: The Paradox of Humanitarian Action. Cornell University Press. ISBN 978-0-8014-8796-5.
- Thackrah, John Richard (2008). Routledge Companion to Military Conflict since 1945. Taylor & Francis. ISBN 978-0-203-01470-7 – via Google Books.
- Tharoor, Ishaan (30 July 2025). "Leading genocide scholars see a genocide happening in Gaza". The Washington Post. Archived from the original on 11 August 2025.
- Tomasevich, Jozo (2001). War and Revolution in Yugoslavia, 1941–1945: Occupation and Collaboration. Vol. 2. San Francisco: Stanford University Press. ISBN 978-0-8047-3615-2.
- Turits, Richard Lee (August 2002). "A World Destroyed, A Nation Imposed: The 1937 Haitian Massacre in the Dominican Republic". Hispanic American Historical Review. 82 (3): 589–635. doi:10.1215/00182168-82-3-589. S2CID 143872486. Archived from the original on 13 February 2017.
- Turits, Richard Lee (2004). Foundations of Despotism: Peasants, the Trujillo Regime, and Modernity in Dominican History. Stanford University Press.
- De Vogli, Roberto; Montomoli, Jonathan; Abu-Sittah, Ghassan; Pappé, Ilan (2025). "Break the selective silence on the genocide in Gaza". The Lancet. 406 (10504). Supplementary appendix pp. 3–4. doi:10.1016/S0140-6736(25)01541-7. PMID 40752501.
- Wei, Yuan (1842). Shèng wǔ jì 聖武記 [The Legend of the Sacred Warriors] (in Chinese). Vol. 4. "Jì shù shí wàn hù zhōng, xiān dòu sǐzhě shí zhī sì, jì cuàn rù èluósī hāsàkè zhě shí zhī èr, zú jiān yú dàbīng zhě shí zhī sān. Chú fùrú chōng shǎng wài, zhìjīn wéi lái jiàng shòu tún zhī è lǔ tè ruògān hù, biān shè zuǒ lǐng áng jí, cǐwài shù qiān lǐ jiān, wú wǎlá yī zhān zhàng." 計數十萬戶中，先痘死者十之四，繼竄入俄羅斯哈薩克者十之二，卒殲於大兵者十之三。除婦孺充賞外，至今惟來降受屯之厄鲁特若干戶，編設佐領昂吉，此外數千里間，無瓦剌一氊帳。 [Among the hundreds of thousands of households, four out of ten died of pox first, two out of ten fled into Russian Kazakhs, and three out of ten were killed by the soldiers. In addition to the generous rewards for women and children, so far only a few families from Erut who have come to the camp have set up assistants and leaders Angji. In addition, there is not a single tent with tiles or tiles for thousands of miles.]
- Weiss-Wendt, Anton (2017). The Soviet Union and the Gutting of the UN Genocide Convention. University of Wisconsin Press. ISBN 978-0-299-31290-9.
- Werth, Nicolas (2004). "Strategies of Violence in the Stalinist USSR". In Rousso, Henry; Golsan, Richard Joseph (eds.). Stalinism and Nazism: History and Memory Compared. University of Nebraska Press. ISBN 978-0-8032-9000-6. LCCN 2003026805.
- "Revised and Updated Report on the Question of the Prevention and Punishment of the Crime of Genocide". Whitaker Report. United Nations. 1985. "According to the 1985 United Nations' Whitaker Report, some 65,000 Herero (80 per cent of the total Herero population), and 10,000 Nama (50% of the total Nama population) were killed between 1904 and 1907"
- Williams, Dianne (2012). Race, Ethnicity, and Crime (soft cover ed.). Algora Publishing. ISBN 978-0-87586-915-5.
