= Uğur Ümit Üngör =

Dutch–Turkish historian, sociologist, and professor (born 1980)

Uğur Ümit Üngör (born in Erzincan, 1980) is a Dutch–Turkish academic, historian, sociologist, and professor of genocide studies, specializing as a scholar and researcher of Holocaust studies and studies on mass violence. He served as professor of history at the Utrecht University and Professor of Sociology at the NIOD Institute for War, Holocaust and Genocide Studies.

== Biography ==
=== Studies and career ===
Üngör, who was born in Erzincan, Turkey and raised in Enschede, the Netherlands, earned a doctorate from the University of Amsterdam in 2009, and taught history at the Utrecht University and sociology at the NIOD Institute for War, Holocaust and Genocide Studies in Amsterdam. Üngör was Lecturer in International History at the University of Sheffield 2008–2009, then Postdoctoral Research Fellow at the Centre for War Studies at the University College Dublin in 2009–2010. Since February 2020, he has been Professor of Holocaust and Genocide Studies at the NIOD Institute for War, Holocaust and Genocide Studies in Amsterdam.

He has published widely in the field of mass violence and genocide studies, in particular the late Ottoman genocides, the Armenian genocide, and the Rwandan genocide. Üngör's book based on his dissertation, The Making of Modern Turkey: Nation and State in Eastern Anatolia, 1913-50 (Oxford University Press, 2011), was the winner of the Erasmus Prize by the Praemium Erasmianum Foundation in 2010, and of the Keetje Hodshon Prize awarded by the Royal Holland Society of Sciences and Humanities in 2013. In 2012, Üngör was awarded the Heineken Young Scientist Award in History by the Royal Dutch Academy of Sciences.

He and Alexander Goekjian, who also wrote the screenplay and directed, are featured in the documentary The Land of Our Grandparents, which was shown on Dutch public television on 24 April 2008, and was awarded the prize for best documentary at the Pomegranate Film Festival in Toronto that year. Üngör also co-wrote Confiscation and Destruction: The Young Turk Seizure of Armenian Property in 2011. His most recent work, De Syrische Goelag: Assads Gevangenissen, 1970–2020, was published in 2022 and focused on the dynamics of paramilitary violence in the Syrian civil war, notably on the Tadamon massacre.

== Works ==
=== Articles ===
- Üngör, Uğur Ümit (June 2008). "Seeing like a nation-state: Young Turk social engineering in Eastern Turkey, 1913–50". Journal of Genocide Research. 10 (1). London and New York: Routledge: 15–39. doi:10.1080/14623520701850278. ISSN 1469-9494. OCLC 260038904. S2CID 71551858.
- Üngör, Uğur Ümit (2012). "Disastrous Decade: Armenians and Kurds in the Young Turk Era, 1915–25". In Jongerden, Joost; Verheij, Jelle (eds.). Social Relations in Ottoman Diyarbekir, 1870–1915. Islamic History and Civilization. Vol. 51. Leiden and Boston: Brill Publishers. pp. 267–295. doi:10.1163/9789004232273_010. ISBN 978-90-04-23227-3. ISSN 1380-6076. S2CID 130614294.

=== Essays ===
- Üngör, Uğur Ümit; Polatel, Mehmet (2011). Confiscation and Destruction: The Young Turk Seizure of Armenian Property. London: Bloomsbury Publishing. ISBN 978-1-4411-1020-6.
- Üngör, Uğur Ümit (2012). The Making of Modern Turkey: Nation and State in Eastern Anatolia, 1913-50. Oxford and New York: Oxford University Press. ISBN 978-0-19-965522-9.
- Üngör, Uğur Ümit (2020). Paramilitarism: Mass Violence in the Shadow of the State. Oxford and New York: Oxford University Press. ISBN 978-0-19-882524-1.
- Üngör, Uğur Ümit (2022). De Syrische Goelag: Assads Gevangenissen, 1970–2020 (in Dutch). Boom. ISBN 978-9-02-443206-6.
