= The Thirty-Year Genocide =

2019 history book written by Benny Morris and Dror Ze'evi

The Thirty-Year Genocide: Turkey's Destruction of Its Christian Minorities, 1894–1924
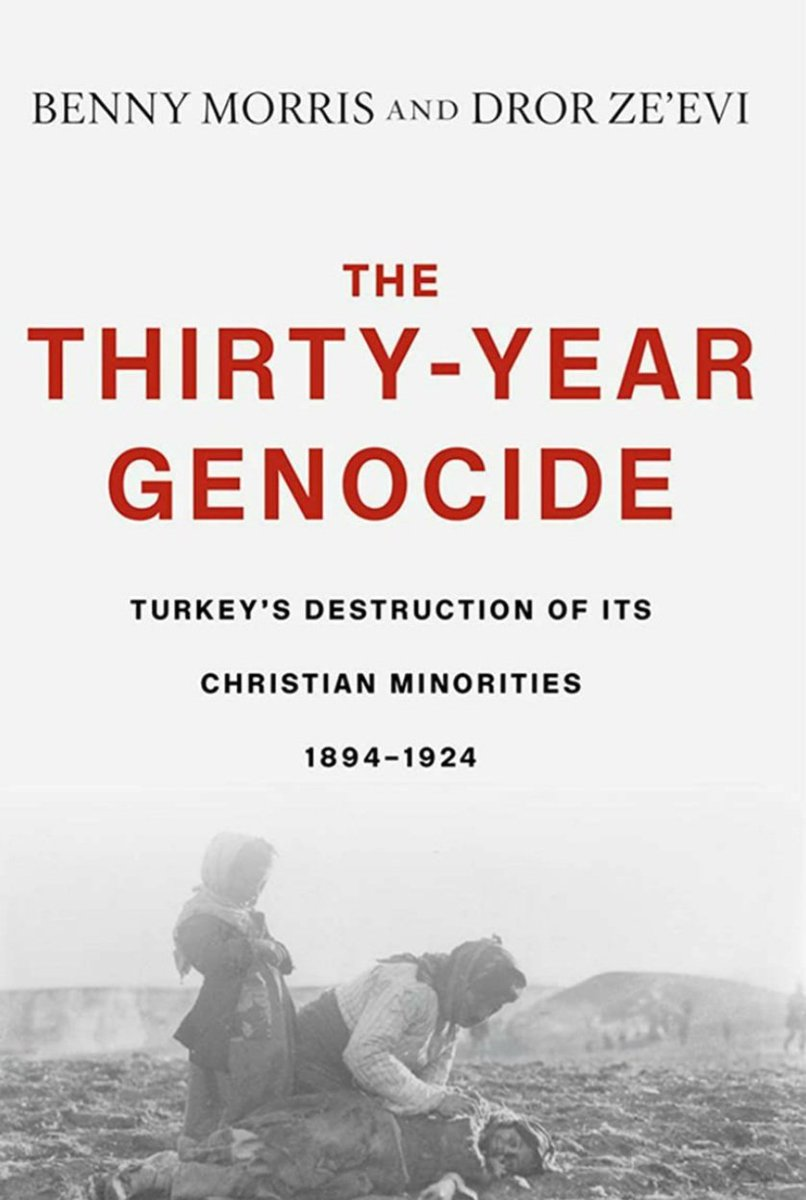
- First edition
- Author: Benny Morris, Dror Ze'evi
- Language: English
- Genre: Non-fiction
- Publisher: Harvard University Press
- Publication date: 2019
- Publication place: United States

The Thirty-Year Genocide: Turkey's Destruction of Its Christian Minorities, 1894–1924 is a 2019 history book written by Israeli historians Benny Morris and Dror Ze'evi. They argue that the Armenian genocide and other contemporaneous persecution of Christians in the Ottoman Empire constitute an extermination campaign, or genocide, carried out by the Ottoman Empire against its Christian subjects.

== Publication history ==
The book was written by Israeli historians Benny Morris and Dror Ze'evi and published by Harvard University Press in 2019. A Greek edition is forthcoming. Morris is a specialist in the Israeli–Palestinian conflict, while Ze'evi is known for his previous work on early modern Ottoman history.

== Content ==
The central argument of the book is that the Hamidian massacres, the Armenian genocide, Assyrian genocide, and Greek genocide should be understood as a single event, which targeted all the Christian minorities in the Ottoman Empire and subsequent Kemalist Turkish Republic. The authors note that it is not disputed by scholars that while five million Christians lived in the lands that became Turkey, starting in 1894 (20 percent of the population), only tens of thousands remained in 1924, and at least two million were murdered by Muslims. The authors identify a pattern that repeats, with minor variations, across the time period under study. The first targets of attack are men of military age and those with influence, then women and children are handled later. Following previous scholarship, the authors identify Islam and religious fundamentalism as the primary causes of the genocide, which had as its aim the foundation of a pure, Muslim state. Victims were asked to convert to Islam, which sometimes saved the lives of targeted women and children. The book is more than 640 pages long.

== Reception ==
=== Positive ===
Historian Hervé Georgelin describes the book "an ambitious and comprehensive work on the extinction of Christian life on the former central Ottoman lands" and "a clever and learned synthesis". According to Georgelin, the fact that both authors do not belong to any of the affected communities means that they can take a bird's-eye view as opposed to "duplicat[ing] social ethno-religious boundaries, to little heuristic avail". Historian Wolfgang G. Schwanitz wrote that "The evidence cited in this well-researched book is overwhelming". Philosopher Patrick Madigan wrote that the authors "have performed a Herculean labour in compensating for the heavily-purged Turkish records and sanitized official archives through exhaustive research in diplomatic, missionary and tourist reports to produce this doorstop of a book that will serve as the definitive account of a genocide" and concludes that "As one immerses oneself in the details, it is hard to resist a Nietzschean-and-Girardian argument on the power of ressentiment when one sees one’s once-dominant culture defeated and humiliated by a people you once had conquered – and to visit one’s consequent frustration, outrage and fury upon an innocent-but-different scapegoat who could be depicted as somehow responsible and even a fifth-columnist.".

David Gaunt, a historian of the Assyrian genocide, states that the book may become "a reference work for those desiring a broad introduction to the totality of late Ottoman anti-Christian campaigns". He praises the "sheer amount of incriminating testimony that Morris and Ze’evi have managed to assemble", including demonstrating the personal responsibility of Mustafa Kemal for completing the genocide and ethnic/religious cleansing of the empire's remaining Christian population. However, he faults the authors' interpretation in some places, stating "the Assyrians... were less of a passive victim than Morris and Ze'evi maintain" and that the international law concept of genocide may not be the best way to understand endemic ethnic and religious violence in Anatolia and Upper Mesopotamia. He nevertheless notes and concludes that "Benny Morris and Dror Ze’evi have done a great service to the study of comparative genocide".

In The New York Times, journalist Bruce Clark writes that "The reader is left wondering what the authors ultimately feel about the treatment of civilians in situations of total war." By weighing up the arguments for and against the forced deportation of civilians in certain situations, the authors imply, in contrast to established international law, that it might sometimes be justified. However, he praises the book for "offer[ing] a subtle diagnosis of why, at particular moments over a span of three decades, Ottoman rulers and their successors unleashed torrents of suffering". Alex J. Bellamy opined that the "important, beautifully crafted book", "contributes significantly to our understanding of what happened during these 30 years of violence, as well as to our understanding of genocide more broadly".

=== Negative ===
Mark Levene writes that the book lacks attention to nuances and different factions in the Ottoman Empire, and that "everything is reduced to an essentialist clash of civilizations, a thesis they can only sustain by suffocating complexity or simply not engaging with it all". Levene argues that the authors misrepresent the role of embittered Muslim refugees driven out of the Balkans as perpetrators in violence against the Christian minorities in Anatolia, which he compares to the role of Greek refugees from Anatolia used against the Jews of Salonika and as perpetrators of ethnic cleansing of Slavic-speakers from Greece. He concludes that "the exterminatory violence of this period can be best explained not through a traditionally religious prism per se but actually its breakdown as the sinews of the old, hierarchic, Islamic-Ottoman order collapsed psychically and actually under the intolerable weight of both geo-political and nationalizing pressures". Eileen Kane states that "The biggest problem with this poorly argued book is that it does not tell us how and why people in these particular historical circumstances were motivated to attack and kill people who were, in many cases, their neighbors."

According to Laura Robson, the book is "intended to serve not just as history but also as warning". She argues that Morris and Ze'evi, who rely heavily on British and American sources, have a limited understanding of how the Ottoman millet system actually operated in practice, and underestimate the role of the expulsions and mass killings of Muslims during the Balkan Wars as a trigger for the genocide. David Gutman writes that, although the book has some solid moments, the authors lack engagement with secondary sources, and disputes many of their conclusions. Mustafa Aksakal states that the book is less persuasive than other publications on mass violence in the late Ottoman Empire and "The handling of some of the source material raises doubts about the extent and care taken in research." In Agos, Vicken Cheterian was "disappointed" with the book, saying that it offers few new insights. He wrote that "The two authors, by posing this question as the start of their investigation, give the impression as if no historian had noticed before them about the exterminations of Ottoman Christians, as if no one had written this history before them", although he notes that "There are some interesting details" in the book.

According to Ronald Grigor Suny, the book is a throwback to earlier historiography such as Vahakn Dadrian's work that placed emphasis on religion's supposed role in generating violence, instead of the secondary role that religion is granted in mainstream works. "A deep Islamophobia underlies their narrative... [the authors] have moved beyond careful historical thinking toward grand claims based on essentialist views of Islam and an ideological construction of Muslims in general".

==== Response ====
The authors, Benny Morris and Dror Ze'evi, responded to the negative reviews of their book in the Journal of Genocide Research.

== Related books ==
- American Accounts Documenting the Destruction of Smyrna by the Kemalist Turkish Forces: September 1922. (2005). Greece: Aristide D. Caratzas, Melissa International.
- Üngör, U. Ü. (2011). The Making of Modern Turkey: Nation and State in Eastern Anatolia, 1913–1950. United Kingdom: OUP Oxford.
- Nationalism and Non-Muslim Minorities in Turkey, 1915 - 1950. (2021). (n.p.): Transnational Press London.
- De Lange, M., Lamprecht, B. (2012). The Edge of Paradise: Turkey Is Beautiful. But for Christians There Is Always a Price. United Kingdom: Monarch.
- Clark, B. (2006). Twice a Stranger: The Mass Expulsions that Forged Modern Greece and Turkey. United Kingdom: Harvard University Press.
- Kostos, S. K. (2011). Before The Silence: Archival News Reports Of The Christian Holocaust That Begs To Be Remembered. Germany: Gorgias Press.

== See also ==
- Christianity in Turkey
- Outline of the Greek genocide
- Genocides in history
- List of genocides by death toll
- List of massacres in Turkey
- Human rights in Turkey
- Freedom of religion in Turkey
