= Adam Jones (Canadian scholar) =

Canadian political scientist and writer

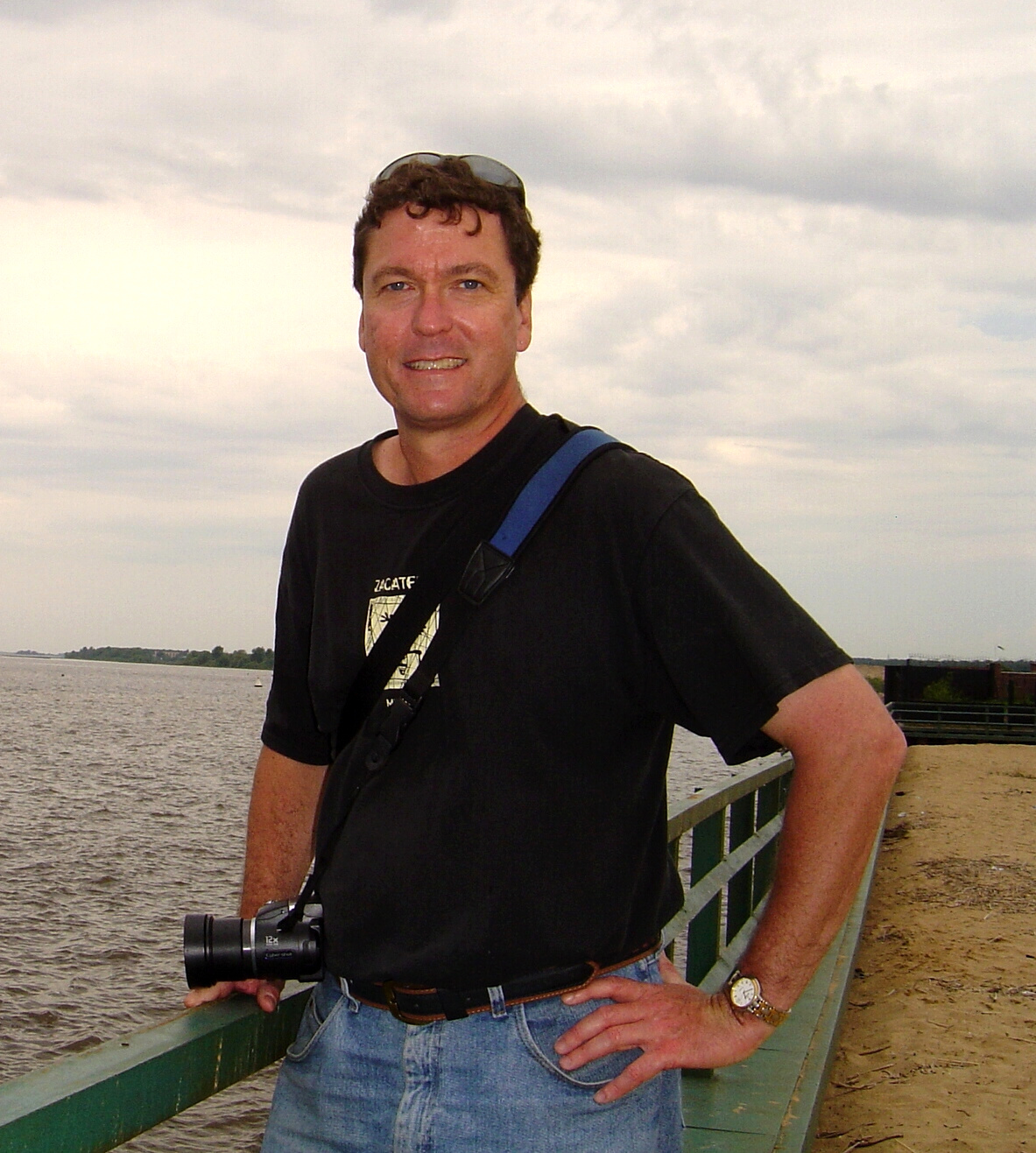
- Jones in 2008
- Citizenship: British-Canadian
- Occupations: Political scientist, author, photojournalist
- Website: adamjones.freeservers.com

Adam Jones is a Canadian political scientist, writer, and photojournalist based at the University of British Columbia Okanagan in Kelowna, British Columbia, Canada. He is the author of Genocide: A Comprehensive Introduction and other books in genocide studies. He is Executive Director of Gendercide Watch. He was chosen as one of "Fifty Key Thinkers on the Holocaust and Genocide" for the book of that name, which was published in 2010. He is also a published photographer, both in print and online under a Creative Commons license.

== Genocide ==
He is author of a textbook in the field, Genocide: A Comprehensive Introduction (Routledge, 3rd edn. 2016), and author or editor of other works on genocide and crimes against humanity, including The Scourge of Genocide: Essays and Reflections (Routledge, 2013). He was senior book review editor of the Journal of Genocide Research from 2004 to 2013, and currently edits the Studies in Genocide and Crimes against Humanity book series for Routledge Publishers.

== Gender and international relations ==
Jones is known for his distinctive approach to the study of gender and international relations.

== Works ==
- Jones, Adam (2022). Sites of Genocide (1st ed.). Routledge. ISBN 9781032001517.
- Jones, Adam (2017). Genocide: A Comprehensive Introduction (3rd ed.). Routledge. ISBN 9781138823846.
- Jones, Adam (2013). The Scourge of Genocide: Essays and Reflections. Routledge. ISBN 9780415690539.
- Jones, Adam (2013). In Iran: Text and Photos. Lulu Press. ISBN 9780991852208.
- Jones, Adam, ed. (2012). New Directions in Genocide Research. Routledge. ISBN 978-0-415-49597-4.
- Jones, Adam (2010). Genocide: A Comprehensive Introduction (2nd ed.). Routledge. ISBN 978-0-415-48619-4.
- Jones, Adam, ed. (2009). Evoking Genocide: Scholars and Activists Describe the Works That Shaped Their Lives. The Key Publishing House Inc. ISBN 978-0-9782526-9-4.
- Robins, Nicholas A.; Jones, Adam, eds. (2009). Genocides by the Oppressed: Subaltern Genocide in Theory and Practice. Indiana University Press. ISBN 978-0-253-35309-2.
- Jones, Adam (2009). Gender Inclusive: Essays on Violence, Men, and Feminist International Relations. Routledge Publishers. ISBN 978-0-415-77513-7.
- Jones, Adam, ed. (2008). Genocide (4 volumes). Sage Publishers. ISBN 978-1-84787-022-3.
- Jones, Adam (2008). Crimes Against Humanity: A Beginner's Guide. OneWorld Publications. ISBN 978-1-85168-601-8.
- Jones, Adam (2008). Latin American Portraits (travel photography). The Key Publishing House Inc. ISBN 978-0-9782526-3-2.
- Jones, Adam (2006). Genocide: A Comprehensive Introduction. Routledge Publishers. ISBN 0-415-35384-X.
- Jones, Adam, ed. (2005). Kal Holsti: Ensayos Escogidos (Kal Holsti: Selected Essays). CIDE. ISBN 9789687420165.
- Jones, Adam, ed. (2004). Men of the Global South: A Reader. Zed Books. ISBN 1-84277-513-8.
- Jones, Adam, ed. (2004). Gendercide and Genocide. Vanderbilt University Press. ISBN 0-8265-1445-6.
- Jones, Adam, ed. (2004). Genocide, War Crimes & the West: History and Complicity. Zed Books. ISBN 1-84277-191-4.
- Jones, Adam (2002). Beyond the Barricades: Nicaragua and the Struggle for the Sandinista Press, 1979-1998. Ohio University Press. ISBN 0-89680-223-X.
- Jones, Adam (2002). The Press in Transition: A Comparative Study of Nicaragua, South Africa, Jordan, and Russia. Deutsches Übersee-Institut. ISBN 3-926953-53-5.
