= Jürgen Zimmerer =

German historian of modern age

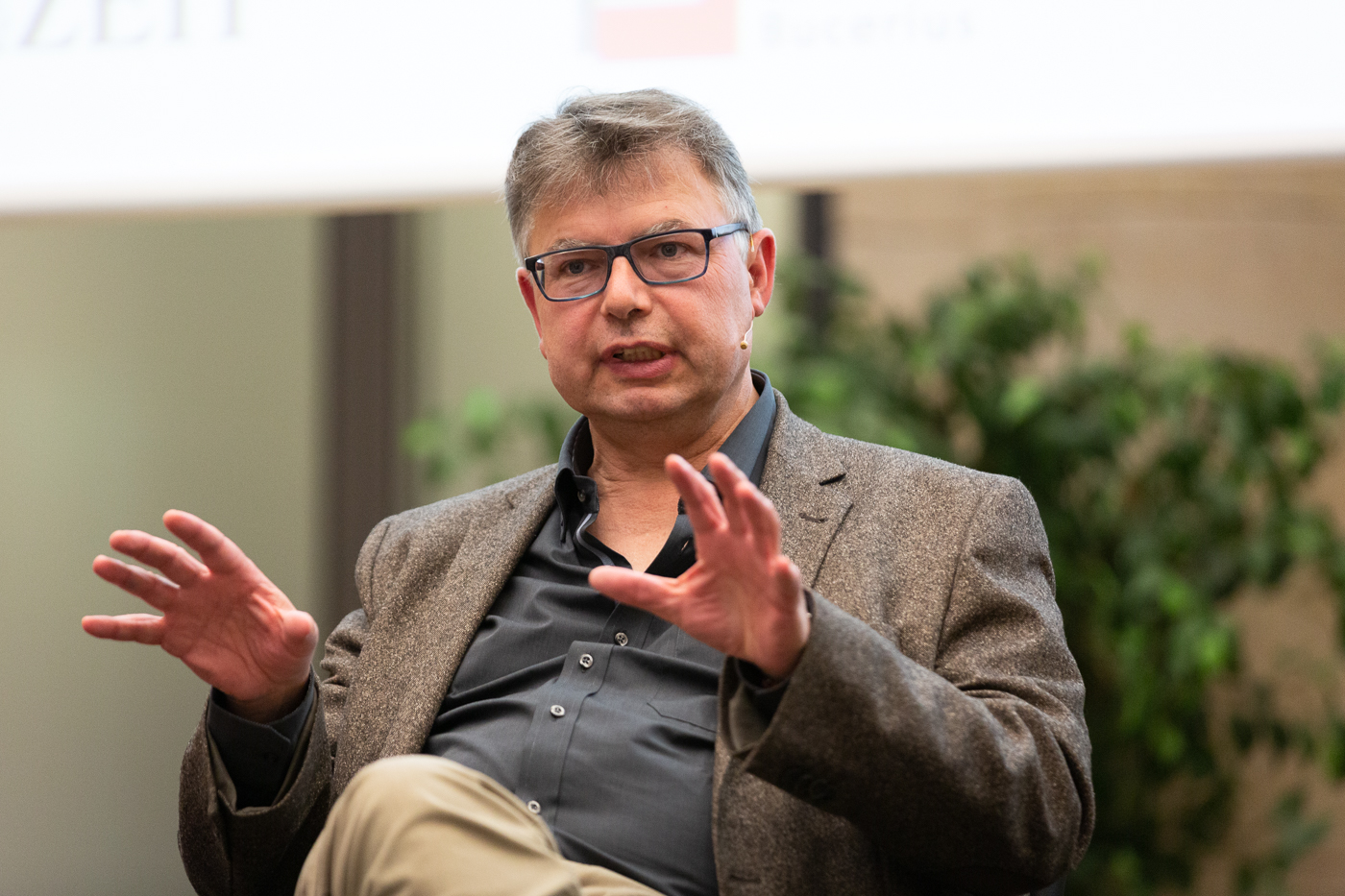
- Portrait of Zimmerer, 2019
- Born: 1965 (age 60–61); Wörth an der Donau, Bavaria, West Germany
- Occupation: Historian
- Board member of: INoGS; Journal of Genocide Research

Academic background
- Education: University of Freiburg
- Thesis: Deutsche Herrschaft über Afrikaner. Staatlicher Machtanspruch und Wirklichkeit im kolonialen Namibia (2000)
- Doctoral advisor: Wolfgang Reinhard and Christoph Marx

Academic work
- Discipline: History
- Sub-discipline: Postcolonialism
- Institutions: Kiel University; University of Coimbra; University of Duisburg-Essen; University of Sheffield; University of Hamburg
- Main interests: Genocide studies
- Notable ideas: Windhoek to Auschwitz thesis
- Website: Publications by Jürgen Zimmerer at ResearchGate

Jürgen Zimmerer (born 1965) is a German historian and Africanist. Since 2010 he has been Professor of African History at the University of Hamburg. He is known for his work on colonial history, genocide studies, and the relationship between German colonialism and National Socialism.

== Career ==
Zimmerer studied history, political science and German studies at the universities of Regensburg, Oxford, and Freiburg, earning an M.A. in Modern History at Oxford in 1991 and a doctorate in Freiburg in 2000 on German colonial rule in Namibia (during the time of so-called German South West Africa). He taught in Kiel, Coimbra, Duisburg-Essen and from 2005 to 2010 at the University of Sheffield, where he founded the Sheffield Centre for Genocide Studies. In 2010 he accepted a chair in Global History (with a focus on Africa) at the University of Hamburg. Since 2014 he is the director of the Research Centre "Hamburg’s (Post-)Colonial Legacy".

He has served as founding president of the International Network of Genocide Scholars (2005–2017) and as editor of the Journal of Genocide Research (2005–2011).

== Research and views ==
Zimmerer's research focuses on colonialism, postcolonialism, comparative genocide studies, the Holocaust, and global history. He is one of the main proponents of the "continuity thesis", which argues that there are lines of continuity between German colonial violence in Namibia, particularly the genocide against the Herero and Nama, and the Holocaust. He has described the suppression of the Herero uprising as "the first German genocide of the 20th century" and drawn a "line from Windhoek to Auschwitz".

His views have been influential in bringing Germany's colonial past into public debate, though scholars such as Birthe Kundrus, Gesine Krüger and Pascal Grosse have criticized the continuity thesis for downplaying key differences between colonial racism and Nazi antisemitism.

Zimmerer has also worked on memory culture and debates over colonial legacies in Germany. He has since early on in the conception of the rebuilding of the Humboldt Forum criticized it for ignoring colonial history, advocated for a national center of colonial remembrance in Hamburg, and contributed to guidelines on handling collections from colonial contexts. He has also examined the links between climate change, violence, and genocide, coining the term "environmental violence".

== Legacy ==
In 2020, he won a lifetime achievement award of the International Network of Genocide Scholars for "his groundbreaking work in the field of colonial genocide studies".

== Selected works ==
- Deutsche Herrschaft über Afrikaner: Staatlicher Machtanspruch und Wirklichkeit im kolonialen Namibia (2001; English trans. 2021)
- (ed., with Joachim Zeller) Völkermord in Deutsch-Südwestafrika: Der Kolonialkrieg (1904–1908) in Namibia und seine Folgen (2003)
- (ed.) Kein Platz an der Sonne: Erinnerungsorte der deutschen Kolonialgeschichte (2013)
