= Damien Short =

Damien Short is a professor of human rights and environmental justice at the School of Advanced Study of the University of London.

Focuses of his research include indigenous rights, genocide studies, and environmental human rights. Short is the editor-in-chief of the International Journal of Human Rights and a member of the International Network of Genocide Scholars. He is co-director of the Human Rights Consortium and the Environmental Humanities Research Hub at the School of Advanced Study.

== Life and career ==
Short received an MA and a PhD from the University of Essex, along with an LLB from the University of Wales.

He is a judge on the International Rights of Nature Tribunal, a project of the Global Alliance for the Rights of Nature.

Books published by Short include Reconciliation and Colonial Power: Indigenous Rights in Australia (2008) and Redefining Genocide: Settler Colonialism, Social Death and Ecocide (2016).

== Works ==
- Short, Damien (2003). "Reconciliation, Assimilation, and the Indigenous Peoples of Australia". International Political Science Review. 24 (4): 491–513. doi:10.1177/01925121030244005. S2CID 144432933.
- Short, Damien (2005). "Reconciliation and the Problem of Internal Colonialism". Journal of Intercultural Studies. 26 (3): 267–282. doi:10.1080/07256860500153534. S2CID 144864676.
- Short, Damien (2016) [2008]. Reconciliation and Colonial Power: Indigenous Rights in Australia. Routledge. ISBN 978-1-317-07054-2.
- Short, Damien (2011). "Cultural genocide and indigenous peoples: a sociological approach". Sociology and Human Rights: New Engagements. Routledge. ISBN 978-1-315-87464-7.
- Huseman, Jennifer; Short, Damien (2012). "'A slow industrial genocide': tar sands and the indigenous peoples of northern Alberta". The International Journal of Human Rights. 16 (1): 216–237. doi:10.1080/13642987.2011.649593. S2CID 144191921.
- Higgins, Polly; Short, Damien; South, Nigel (2013). "Protecting the planet: a proposal for a law of ecocide". Crime, Law and Social Change. 59 (3): 251–266. doi:10.1007/s10611-013-9413-6. ISSN 1573-0751. S2CID 254425099.
- Short, Martin Crook, Damien (2015). "Marx, Lemkin and the genocide–ecocide nexus". Climate Change and Genocide. Routledge. ISBN 978-1-315-71487-5.
- Morley, Damien Short, Jessica Elliot, Kadin Norder, Edward Lloyd-Davies, Joanna (2016). "Extreme energy, 'fracking' and human rights: a new field for human rights impact assessments?". Corporate Power and Human Rights. Routledge. ISBN 978-1-315-62280-4.
- Short, Damien (2016). Redefining Genocide: Settler Colonialism, Social Death and Ecocide. Bloomsbury Publishing. ISBN 978-1-84813-546-8.
- Crook, Martin; Short, Damien; South, Nigel (2018). "Ecocide, genocide, capitalism and colonialism: Consequences for indigenous peoples and glocal ecosystems environments" (PDF). Theoretical Criminology. 22 (3): 298–317. doi:10.1177/1362480618787176. S2CID 150239863.
- Short, Damien; Szolucha, Anna (January 2019). "Fracking Lancashire: The planning process, social harm and collective trauma". Geoforum. 98: 264–276. doi:10.1016/j.geoforum.2017.03.001. hdl:1956/23207.
