= Twice A Stranger: How Mass Expulsion Forged Modern Greece and Turkey =

Book

Book cover: Twice A Stranger

Twice A Stranger: How Mass Expulsion Forged Modern Greece and Turkey (also published as Twice A Stranger: The Mass Expulsions that Forged Modern Greece and Turkey) is a book by Bruce Clark published in 2006 concerning the population exchange between Greece and Turkey which took place in the early 1920s, following the Treaty of Lausanne.

As well as giving a detailed account of the background to the exchange, its implementation and immediate consequences, the author examines the continuing effects which it has had on the politics, culture and national identity of both the states concerned. He focuses particularly on the ambivalent feelings of the few surviving expellees and their descendants towards their former homelands.

== Structure of the book ==
- Preface: Lausanne's children (pp. xi-xvii);

In the preface, the author reflects on the phenomenon of nationalism as it manifested itself in these events and on parallels and contrasts with other later situations such as the Expulsion of Germans after World War II, the "Palestinian exodus" and the parallel Jewish exodus from Arab lands, the population movements in Bosnia in the 1990s and the ongoing situation in Northern Ireland.

- Introduction: A world torn asunder (pp. 1–19)
- Chapters

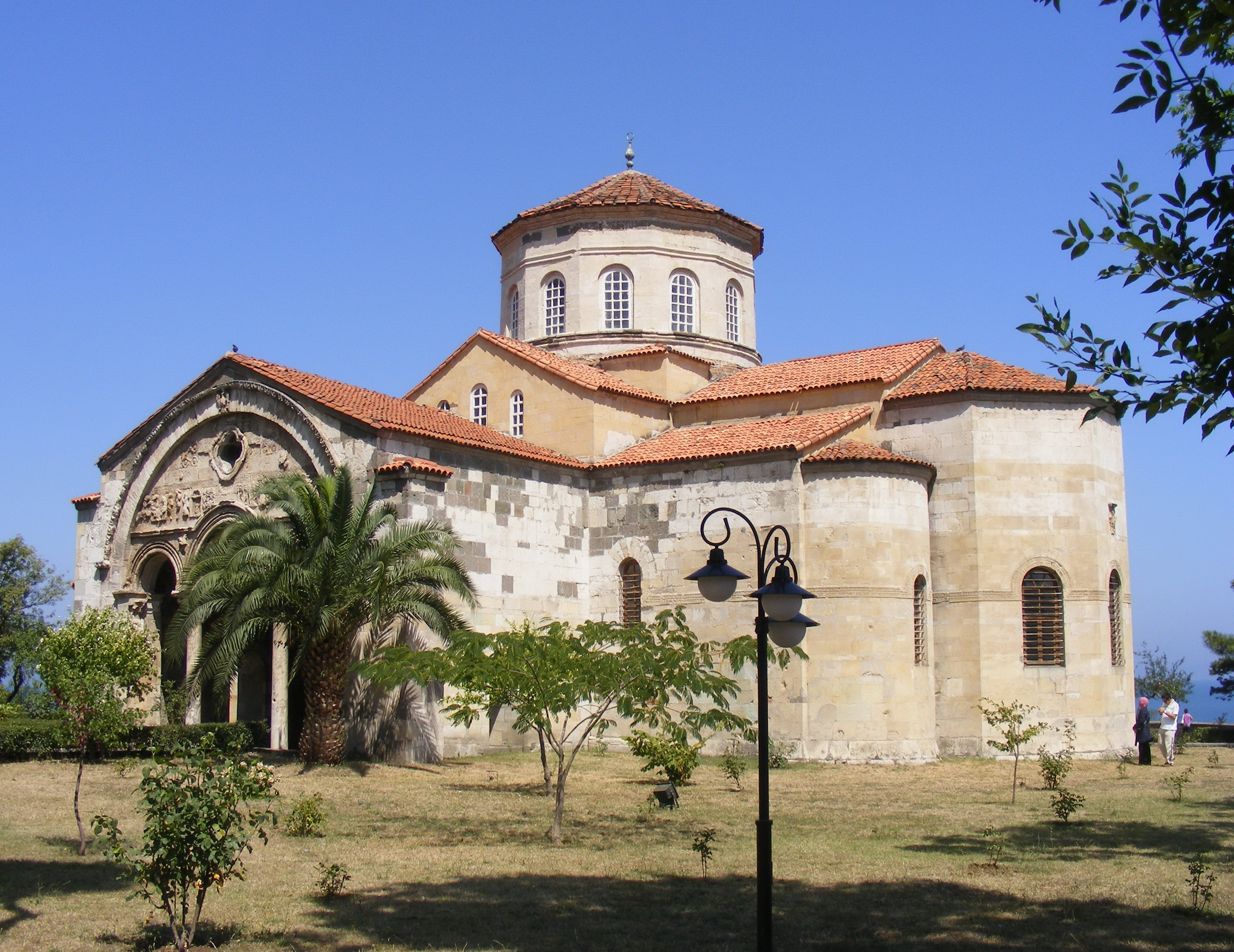
No. 14: Hagia Sophia, Trabzon

1. Ayvalık and its ghosts (pp. 21-41)
2. The road to Lausanne (pp. 42-64)
3. Lost brothers, lost sisters: from Samsun to Drama (pp. 65-86)
4. Who goes, who stays: the Lausanne bargain (pp. 87-107)
5. Hidden faiths, hidden ties: the fate of Ottoman Trebizond (pp. 108-130) There then follow 12 unnumbered pages of 14 photographs:
  - "The great monastery of Panayia Soumela, the spiritual heart of Christian Pontus" has a similar image (no. 13) available at Sümela Monastery
  - "The cathedral of Ayia Sofia in Trebizond, now a museum" has a similar image (no. 14) available at Trabzon
6. Out of Constantinople (pp. 131-157)
7. Saying farewell to Salonika: the Muslims sail away (pp. 138-179)
8. Adapting to Anatolia (pp. 180-200)
9. The pursuit of clarity (pp. 210-222)
10. The price of success (pp. 223-246)

== Publication details ==
- Clarke, Bruce (2006). Twice A Stranger: How Mass Expulsion Forged Modern Greece and Turkey. London: Granta. ISBN 1-86207-752-5.
- Clarke, Bruce (2006). Twice A Stranger: The Mass Expulsions that Forged Modern Greece and Turkey. Cambridge, Massachusetts: Harvard University Press. ISBN 9780674023680.

== Awards ==
- The writer was awarded with the Runciman Prize for this book in 2007.

== See also ==
- Outline of Greek genocide
- Population exchange
- Dissolution of the Ottoman Empire
- Ethnic cleansing
- Millet (Ottoman Empire)
- Religious nationalism
- Kemalist Ideology
- Constantinople pogroms
- Cyprus problem
- Human rights in Turkey

== Related books ==
- Üngör, U. Ü. (2011). The Making of Modern Turkey: Nation and State in Eastern Anatolia, 1913–1950. United Kingdom: OUP Oxford.
- Morris, B., Zeʼevi, D. (2019). The Thirty-Year Genocide: Turkey's Destruction of Its Christian Minorities, 1894–1924. United Kingdom: Harvard University Press.
- Nationalism and Non-Muslim Minorities in Turkey, 1915 - 1950. (2021). (n.p.): Transnational Press London.
