= Dror Ze'evi =

Israeli historian

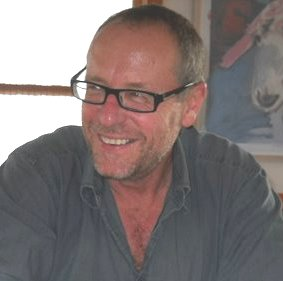
Ze'evi in 2011

Dror Ze'evi (Hebrew: דרור זאבי; born 1953, Haifa) is an Israeli historian who studies the political, social and cultural history of the Ottoman Empire, Turkey and the Levant.

Ze'evi's father, Benjamin (Benny) Zeevi, was deputy head of Mossad, and his mother, Galila, is an interior designer. Ze'evi grew up in different cities around Israel and the world, including several years in France and Britain. He served as an intelligence officer in the IDF until 1983, and was awarded the rank of Lt. Col. during his reserve service.

He wrote his Ph.D. dissertation at Tel Aviv University, on the Ottoman district of Jerusalem in the seventeenth century, and spent a post-doctoral year at Princeton on a Rothschild Fellowship.

In 1992, he returned to Israel and, along with Professor Meir Zamir, founded the Department of Middle East Studies at Ben Gurion University of the Negev. He served as the department's first chair from 1995 to 1998, and again from 2002 to 2004. He also participated in the founding of the Chaim Herzog Center for Middle East Studies and Diplomacy, and served as its first chair from 1997 to 2002.

Ze'evi was part of the group of scholars who relaunched the veteran Israeli "Oriental Society" and renamed it MEISAI (Middle East and Islamic Studies Association of Israel). He served as the association's first president, from 2006 to 2009. He is also one of the founders of the Israeli Forum for Regional Thinking.

== Works ==
- Ze'evi, Dror (1996). An Ottoman Century: The District of Jerusalem in the 1600s. SUNY Press. ISBN 978-1-4384-2475-0.
- Ze’evi, Dror (2006). Producing Desire: Changing Sexual Discourse in the Ottoman Middle East, 1500-1900. University of California Press. ISBN 978-0-520-93898-4.
- Morris, Benny; Ze’evi, Dror (2019). The Thirty-Year Genocide: Turkey's Destruction of Its Christian Minorities, 1894–1924. Harvard University Press. ISBN 978-0-674-91645-6.
