= The Making of Modern Turkey =

Book by Uğur Ümit Üngör

The Making of Modern Turkey: Nation and State in Eastern Anatolia, 1913–1950
- First-edition cover
- Author: Uğur Ümit Üngör
- Publisher: Oxford University Press
- Publication date: 2011
- ISBN: 978-0-199-60360-2

The Making of Modern Turkey: Nation and State in Eastern Anatolia, 1913–1950 is a book by Uğur Ümit Üngör, published by Oxford University Press in 2011. The book focuses on population politics in the transition between the late Ottoman Empire and the formation of the Republic of Turkey, especially in the Diyarbekir region.

== Content ==
The book's cover is a ruined Armenian church, Arakelots Monastery near Muş. Following Erik-Jan Zürcher, Üngör considers that the "Young Turk era" spans the Ottoman Empire and Republic of Turkey after its 1923 founding, "due to compelling continuities in power structure, ideology, cadre, and population policy". The book focuses on the history of the Ottoman administrative region of Diyarbekir Vilayet and contains five chapters: "Nationalism and Population Politics in the late Ottoman Empire", "Genocide of Christians, 1915–16", "Deportations of Kurds, 1916–34", "Culture and Education in the Eastern Provinces", and "The Calm after the Storm: The Politics of Memory". Üngör's central argument is "that from 1913 to 1950, the Young Turk regime subjected Eastern Turkey, an ethnically heterogeneous area, to various forms of nationalist population policies aimed at ethnically homogenizing the region and including it in the Turkish nation state". He states that "The genocide heralded the coming of a new era and stipulated the parameters of a formative Turkish nation state, or an empire with a dominant Sunni Turkish core and a marginalized periphery."

== Reception ==
Armen T. Marsoobian calls the book a "groundbreaking study" and "carefully documented microhistory", comparing it to Bernard Lewis' The Emergence of Modern Turkey. He states that "if one truly desires a deep understanding of modern Turkey, not compromised in important respects by mythic Republican historiography, then Üngör’s book should be favored over Lewis’s". Nicholas Danforth also compares the two books, stating that "Lewis believed modern Turkey emerged; Üngör reminds us it was made," as well as highlighting the cost of that process. Danforth also compares The Making of Modern Turkey to Ryan Gingeras' book Sorrowful Shores, stating that they present a complementary picture of ethnic relations in Eastern and Western Anatolia.

Kemal Karpat states that "The strong indictment is backed by a variety of published and primary sources, occasional brilliant observations and astute statements, as well as theoretical sophistication." However, he believes that the "Young Turk era" elides important differences between the Young Turks and Kemalism. Serhun Al states that "Üngör’s insightful analysis deconstructs the official history of modern Turkey through his excellent demonstration of how Diyarbekir province was demographically transformed by the Young Turk intelligentsia from 1913 to 1950", but that the book would have benefitted with more conceptual clarity around the use of terms such as genocide. Annika Thörne states that "Üngör's study offers its readers a close and impressive look into the local situation and into the historical developments that irrevocably shaped Diyarbakir province as much as the whole Turkey as a result of the Young Turk ideology". However, she states that he does not adequately explain Kurdish identity formation and Kurds' "role as perpetrators during the Armenian genocide, and also" how they later fell victim to population policies.

== See also ==
- Deportations of Kurds
- List of massacres in Turkey
- Human rights in Turkey

== Related books ==
- Nationalism and Non-Muslim Minorities in Turkey, 1915 - 1950. (2021). (n.p.): Transnational Press London.
- De Lange, M., Lamprecht, B. (2012). The Edge of Paradise: Turkey Is Beautiful. But for Christians There Is Always a Price. United Kingdom: Monarch.
- Morris, B., Ze'evi, D. (2019). The Thirty-Year Genocide: Turkey’s Destruction of Its Christian Minorities, 1894–1924. (n.p.): Harvard University Press.
