= Mohamed Adhikari =

Historian

- Scientific career
- Fields: Historian
- Institutions: University of Cape Town

Mohamed Adhikari is a professor of history and author of several books on both coloured identity and politics in South Africa as well as on settler colonialism and genocide.

He is a professor at the University of Cape Town. He was born in Cape Town in 1953, matriculated from Harold Cressy High School in 1971, and obtained a bachelor's degree at the University of Cape Town in 1980.

He has served as a board member of the International Network of Genocide Scholars.

== Bibliography ==
- Adhikari, Mohamed (2005). Not White Enough, Not Black Enough: Racial Identity in the South African Coloured Community. Ohio University Press. ISBN 978-0-89680-442-5.
- Adhikari, Mohamed, ed. (2009). Burdened by Race: Coloured Identities in Southern Africa. Juta and Company Ltd. ISBN 978-1-919895-14-7.
- Adhikari, Mohamed (2011). The Anatomy of a South African Genocide: The Extermination of the Cape San Peoples. Ohio University Press. ISBN 978-0-8214-4400-9.
- Adhikari, Mohamed (2012). Against the Current: a biography of Harold Cressy, 1889–1916. Cape Town: Juta. ISBN 9781919895857. OCLC 803278327.
- Adhikari, Mohamed, ed. (2015). Genocide on Settler Frontiers: When Hunter-Gatherers and Commercial Stock Farmers Clash. Berghahn Books. ISBN 978-1-78238-739-8.
- Adhikari, Mohamed, ed. (2021). Civilian-Driven Violence and the Genocide of Indigenous Peoples in Settler Societies. Routledge. ISBN 978-1-000-41177-5.
- Adhikari, Mohamed (2022). Destroying to Replace: Settler Genocides of Indigenous Peoples. Hackett Publishing. ISBN 978-1-64792-055-5.
- Adhikari, Mohamed (2023). "'Now We Are Natives': The Genocide of the Beothuk People and the Politics of 'Extinction' in Newfoundland". In Jacob, Frank; Göllnitz, Martin (eds.). Genocide and Mass Violence in the Age of Extremes. De Gruyter. pp. 115–136. doi:10.1515/9783110781328. ISBN 978-3-11-078132-8. ISSN 2626-6490.
