= International Network of Genocide Scholars =

Organization dedicated to genocide studies

- Abbreviation: INoGS
- Formation: January 2005
- Founder: Jürgen Zimmerer (Founding President)
- Founded at: Berlin
- Type: Non-profit, non-partisan
- Legal status: Scholarly organization
- Services: Organizes and sponsors international conferences and workshops.
- Fields: Genocide studies, mass violence
- Publication: Journal of Genocide Research (associated since 2005)
- Affiliations: Centre for the Study of Genocide and Mass Violence; University of Sheffield (2008)
- Formerly called: European Network of Genocide Scholars (ENoGS)

The International Network of Genocide Scholars (INoGS) is a non-profit and non-partisan organization dedicated to fostering scholarly multi-disciplinary exchange and academic debate in the field of genocide studies.

== Creation and goals ==
The INoGS was founded in January 2005 in Berlin, initially named the "European Network of Genocide Scholars". According to Israel Charny, the founding president Jürgen Zimmerer stated that he would change the name from ENoGS to INoGS; there was a vote by those present that was "resounding[ly]" opposed to the change; and the change was implemented despite the result of the vote.

According to Jack Nusan Porter, INoGS was a split from the International Association of Genocide Scholars (IAGS), mainly by European researchers, for two reasons: the researchers who created INoGS viewed IAGS as concentrating too much on declarations rather than research; and a public conflict occurred between Israel Charny and Martin Shaw over the assessment of Israel's role in the Deir Yassin massacre and its occupation of Palestinian territories. Charny described the creation of INoGS as occurring independently of IAGS, stating, "There was no prior collaboration with IAGS about the development of INOGS."

INoGS is open to researchers, teachers and students from all academic disciplines working on genocide and mass violence, and has worked closely with academic research units such as the Centre for the Study of Genocide and Mass Violence of the University of Sheffield in 2008.

Since 2005, the Journal of Genocide Research has been associated with INoGS. INoGS regularly organizes and sponsors international conferences and workshops on the subject of genocide studies.

== Executive committee ==
The current executive committee from 2023 until 2025 includes:

- Elisabeth Hope Murray
- Elisabeth Anstett
- Rachel E. McGinnis
- Adam Levin
- Alek Barović

Previous members of the executive committee have included:

- Mohamed Adhikari, University of Cape Town South Africa
- Raz Segal, Stockton University US
- Rachel E. McGinnis, Rochester Institute of Technology US
