= Martin Shaw (sociologist) =

British sociologist and academic (born 1947)

- Born: 30 June 1947 (age 79); Driffield, Yorkshire, England

Martin Shaw (born 30 June 1947) is a British sociologist and academic. He is a research professor of international relations at the Institut Barcelona d'Estudis Internacionals, and emeritus professor of international relations and politics at Sussex University. He is best known for his sociological work on war, genocide and global politics.

== Early life ==
Shaw was born in Driffield, Yorkshire, England, to Sir Roy Shaw and Gwenyth Baron Shaw. He was one of seven children: Adrian, Phillip, David, Daniel, and twin girls Frieda and Catherine. From 1975 to 1983 Roy served as Secretary General with an eye towards supporting art organizations, In 1979 he was knighted. After Roy died in 2012, Gwenyth finished Roy’s autobiography, Catching the Rope: A Memoir of the Early Years 1918-1946 published in 2013. She also wrote her own autobiography Becoming Me: A Memoir of the Years 1923-1946 published in 2014.

== Academic career ==
=== Sociology of war and militarism ===
In his Marxist period in the 1970s, Shaw published Marxism versus Sociology: A Guide to Reading and Marxism and Social Science: The Roots of Social Science. However, he developed a critique of Marxism, which he saw as incapable of fully analysing the problem of war, as he argued in Socialism and Militarism. He pioneered a new sociology of war and militarism, in his edited volume, War, State and Society and in Dialectics of War: An Essay on the Theory of Total War and Peace.

In the 1990s, he published two further studies in this area: Post-Military Society and Civil Society and Media in Global Crises, a study of British responses to the 1991 Gulf War.

=== Work in International Relations ===
Shaw also entered debates in international relations, with his co-edited book State and Society in International Relations (1991) and his books Global Society and International Relations and Theory of the Global State:Globality as Unfinished Revolution. He founded The Global Site (2000), a portal for critical writing on global politics, culture and society, which also became a significant forum for academic debate after 9/11.

=== Genocide ===
In the 2000s, Shaw's research returned to questions of war, now extended into the field of genocide, with four books: War and Genocide, The New Western Way of War: Risk-Transfer War and its Crisis in Iraq What is Genocide? and Genocide and International Relations. As a result of this work, in 2022 he was awarded a Lifetime Achievement Award by the International Network of Genocide Scholars.

In 2010 Shaw was one of the first genocide scholars to analyse the 1948 expulsions of Palestinians. He co-authored a discussion on the subject with Omer Bartov in the same year. After the October 7 attacks, he was one of the first genocide scholars to describe them as genocidal massacres and Israel's response as threatening a full-scale genocide. In 2024, he challenged Israeli historian Benny Morris's view of the Gaza war. As of 2026, according to an article in the Journal of Genocide Research, A. Dirk Moses points out that Holocaust historian Omer Bartov accused Shaw in 2024 of looking to discredit the state of Israel, furthermore implying that it was based on the blood of civilians.

In October 2024, Shaw gave the NIOD Holocaust and Genocide Studies lecture in Amsterdam on "In Defense of the Concept of Genocide", criticizing those like the historian Dirk Moses and international lawyer Philippe Sands who have argued for abandoning the idea of genocide.

In 2025, Shaw published a new book, The New Age of Genocide: Intellectual and Political Challenges after Gaza. In The Middle East Forum's review of the book, it points out that Shaw uses the genocide in Gaza as a presumed event, omitting the fact that Israel could wipe out the entire population of Gaza, but has chosen not to do this.

=== Racism, Brexit and history of the antinuclear movement ===
In the late 2010s, Shaw's work turned to questions of racism, British politics, and Brexit. He published Political Racism: Brexit and Its Aftermath in 2022 and The Campaign for Nuclear Disarmament in 2024.

=== Academic posts ===
Shaw was appointed a lecturer in sociology at the University of Durham (1970–1972) and was lecturer, senior lecturer and reader in sociology at the University of Hull (1972–1994) before becoming professor of international and political sociology (1994). The following year Shaw moved to a chair of international relations and politics at the University of Sussex, where he became a research professor in 2008 and emeritus Professor in 2010. He was a Professorial Fellow at Roehampton University from 2010 to 2020 and has been a research professor at the Institut Barcelona d'Estudis Internacionals since 2011. He was a Leverhulme Fellow in 2000 and an ESRC research fellow in 2004 and 2005.

== Activities, commentary and research ==
He was active in European Nuclear Disarmament (1980–1985) and a member of its national committee, as well as in the Campaign for Nuclear Disarmament. He criticised what he saw as the passivity of the political left in the face of the genocidal wars in Bosnia (1992–1995) and Kosovo (1998–1999). He continues his political commentary by writing for the websites openDemocracy and Byline Times.
