= Genocide studies =

Academic field of study that researches genocide

Genocide studies is an academic field of study that researches genocide. Genocide became a field of study in the mid-1940s with the work of Raphael Lemkin, who coined genocide and started genocide research, and its primary subjects were the Armenian genocide and the Holocaust. The Holocaust was the primary subject matter of genocide studies, starting off as a side field of Holocaust studies, and the field received an extra impetus in the 1990s, when the Bosnian genocide and Rwandan genocide occurred. It is a complex field which lacks consensus on definition principles.

The field emerged in the 1970s and 1980s, as social science began to consider the phenomenon of genocide. Due to the Bosnian genocide, Rwandan genocide, and the Kosovo crisis, genocide studies exploded in the 1990s. In contrast to earlier researchers who assumed that liberal and democratic societies were less likely to commit genocide, revisionists associated with the International Network of Genocide Scholars considered how Western ideas led to genocide. The genocides of indigenous peoples as part of European colonialism were initially not recognized as genocide. Patrick Wolfe spelled out the genocidal logic of settler projects in places like the Americas and Australia. Nevertheless, most genocide research focuses on twentieth-century genocides, while many other cases are understudied. Many genocide scholars are concerned both with objective study of the topic, and helping prevent future genocides.

== Definitions ==
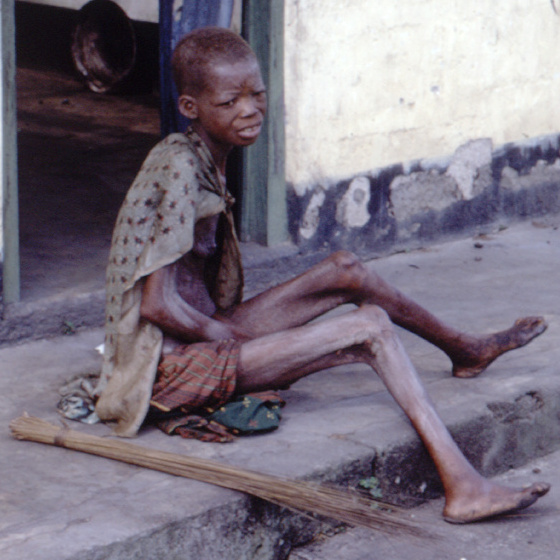
The blockade of Biafra, which resulted in the death of at least 1 million people, was argued not to be genocide because the Nigerian government's aim was to suppress rebellion. The argument contradicts the consensus that genocide can exist even when other an aims and intents are present.

The definition of genocide generates controversy whenever a new case arises and debate erupts as to whether or not it qualifies as a genocide. Sociologist Martin Shaw writes, "Few ideas are as important in public debate, but in few cases are the meaning and scope of a key idea less clearly agreed." Perceptions of genocide vary between seeing it as "an extremely rare and difficult to prove crime", to one that can be found, couched in euphemistic language, in any history book.

Some scholars and activists use the Genocide Convention definition. Others prefer narrower definitions that reduce genocide to mass killing or distinguish it from other types of violence by the innocence, helplessness, or defencelessness of its victims. Most genocides occur during wartime, and distinguishing genocide or genocidal war from non-genocidal warfare can be difficult. Likewise, genocide is distinguished from violent and coercive forms of rule that aim to change behavior rather than destroy groups. Isolated or short-lived phenomena that resemble genocide can be termed genocidal violence.

Cultural genocide or ethnocide refers to actions targeted at the reproduction of a group's language, culture, or way of life. Although left out of the Genocide Convention, most genocide scholars believe that both cultural genocide and structural violence should be included in the definition of genocide, if committed with intent to destroy the targeted group. Many of the more sociologically oriented definitions of genocide overlap that of the crime against humanity of extermination, large-scale killing or induced death as part of a systematic attack on a civilian population. Although included in Lemkin's original concept and by some scholars, political and social groups were also excluded from the Genocide Convention. As a consequence, perpetrators attempt to evade the stigma of genocide by labeling their targets as a political or military enemy.

== Criticism of the concept of genocide and alternatives ==
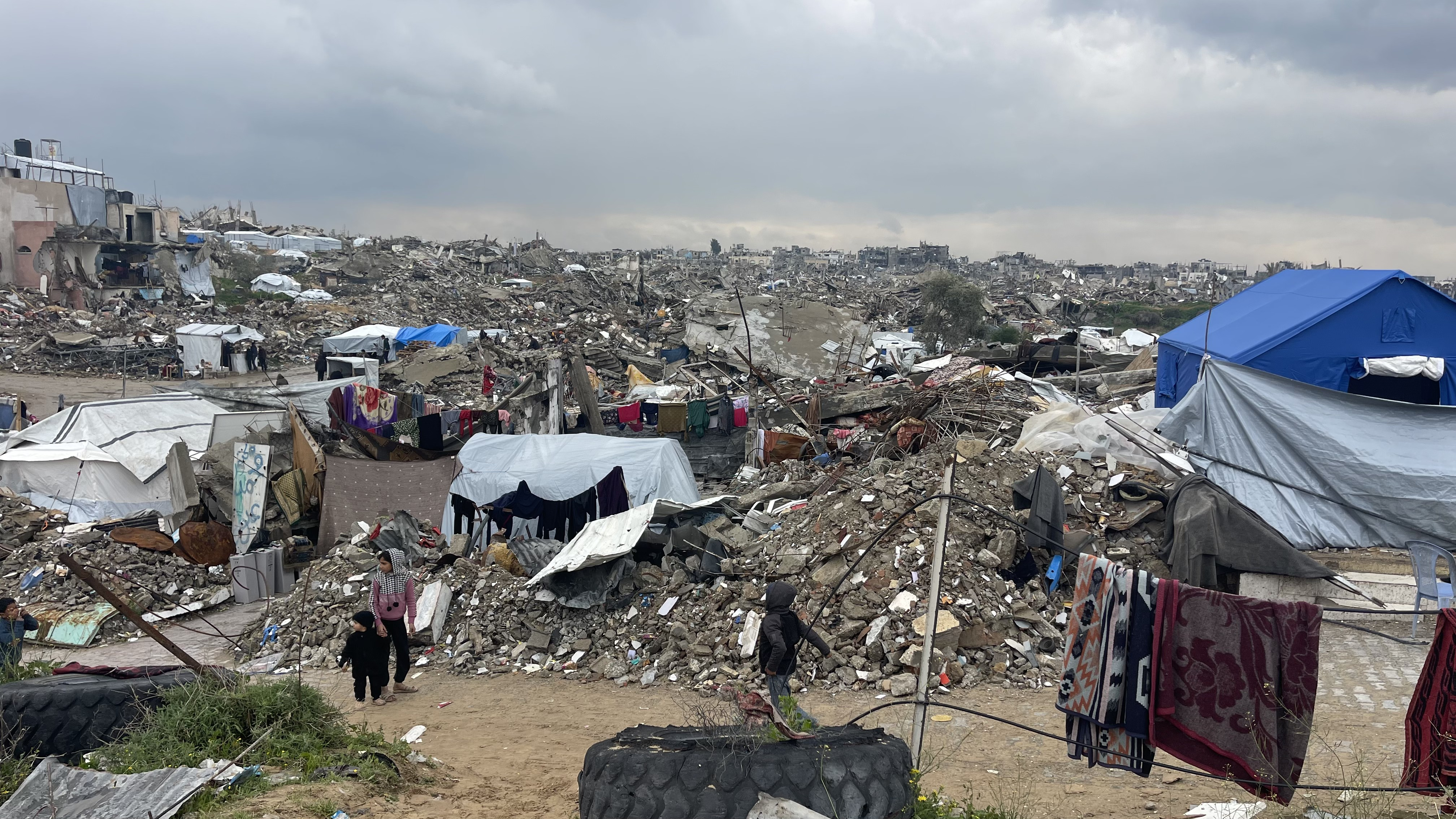
The death of large numbers of civilians as collateral damage of military activity such as aerial bombings is excluded from the definition of genocide, even when they make up a significant portion of a nation's population. South Africa has argued that making Gaza uninhabitable (pictured) is an element of the Gaza genocide.

Most civilian killings in the twentieth century were not from genocide. Alternative terms have been coined to describe processes left outside narrower definitions of genocide. Ethnic cleansing—the forced expulsion of a population from a given territory—has achieved widespread currency, although many scholars recognize that it frequently overlaps with genocide, even where Lemkin's definition is not used. Other terms ending in -cide have proliferated for the destruction of particular types of groupings: democide (people by a government), eliticide (the elite of a targeted group), ethnocide (ethnic groups), gendercide (gendered groupings), politicide (political groups), classicide (social classes), and urbicide (the destruction of a particular locality).

The word genocide inherently carries a value judgement as it is widely considered to be the epitome of human evil. Although genocidal violence has at times been celebrated by its perpetrators and observers, it always had its critics. The idea that genocide sits on top of a hierarchy of atrocity crimes—worse than crimes against humanity or war crimes—is controversial among scholars and suggests that the protection of groups is more important than of individuals and the intention of states is more important than the suffering of civilian victims of violence. A. Dirk Moses and other scholars argue that the prioritization of genocide causes other causes of civilian deaths, such as blockades, bombing, and other "collateral damage" to not be considered in study and response.

== Underlying assumptions ==
Perceptions of genocide vary between seeing it as "an extremely rare and difficult to prove crime", to one that can be found, couched in euphemistic language, in any history book. Some scholars and activists use the Genocide Convention definition. Genocide can be seen as a form of large-scale political violence with the purpose of group destruction. Others prefer narrower definitions that indicate genocide is rare in human history, reducing genocide to mass killing or distinguishing it from other types of violence by the innocence, helplessness, or defencelessness of its victims. Most genocides occur during wartime, and distinguishing genocide or genocidal war from non-genocidal warfare can be difficult. Likewise, genocide is distinguished from violent and coercive forms of rule that aim to change behavior rather than destroy groups. Some definitions include political or social groups as potential victims of genocide. Many of the more sociologically oriented definitions of genocide overlap that of the crime against humanity of extermination, which refers to large-scale killing or induced death as part of a systematic attack on a civilian population. Isolated or short-lived phenomena that resemble genocide can be termed genocidal violence.

The field remains based on an underlying implicit condemnation of genocide and the goal of preventing, prohibiting, and abolishing it.

== History ==
=== Background ===
The beginning of genocide research arose around the 1940s when Raphael Lemkin, a Polish-Jewish lawyer, began studying genocide. Known as the 'father of the genocide convention,' Lemkin invented the term genocide and studied it during World War II. In 1944, Lemkin's book Axis Rule introduced his idea of genocide, which he defined as 'the destruction of a nation or ethnic group'; after his book was published, controversy broke out concerning the specific definition. Many scholars believed that genocide is naturally associated with mass murder, the Holocaust being the first case; there were also several other scholars who believed that genocide has a much broader definition and is not strictly tied to the Holocaust. In his book, Lemkin wrote that "physical and biological genocide are always preceded by cultural genocide or by an attack on the symbols of the group or violent interference of cultural activities." For Lemkin, genocide is the annihilation of a group's culture even if the group themselves are not completely destroyed.

After the publication of Lemkin's 1944 book, Israel Charny sees Pieter Drost's 1959 publication of The Crime of State and a 1967 Congress for the Prevention of Genocide held by La Société Internacionale de Prophalylaxie Criminelle in Paris as two of the few notable events in genocide research prior to the 1970s.

Debate on the definitions of Genocide and its legal implications started in the Nuremberg trials. However, Genocide was not declared to be against international law, and it did not take center stage on the Nuremberg trials. Some suggest that a lack of Jewish representation in the trials resulted in the targeted crimes against the Jewish people not being voiced adequately. The Soviet Union provided the only Jewish testimony heard in the trials. The Polish trials were the first to implement Lempkin's idea of Genocide by declaring a Polish Genocide.

=== 1970s/1980s ===
Charny credits the main launch of genocide studies to four books published in the late 1970s/early 1980s: Genocide: State Power and Mass Murder, by Irving Louis Horowitz in 1976; Accounting for Genocide: National Responses and Jewish Victimization in the Holocaust, by Helen Fein in 1979; Genocide: Its Political Use in the Twentieth Century, by Leo Kuper in 1981; his own 1982 book, How Can We Commit the Unthinkable? Genocide: The Human Cancer; and Genocide and Human Rights: A Global Anthology, by Jack Nusan Porter in 1982. He argues that although Fein's book did not directly refer to genocides other than the Holocaust, its comparison of genocide in different countries occupied by the Nazis "laid groundwork for thinking about comparative studies of genocide in general".

=== 1990s ===
Starting off as a side field to Holocaust studies, several scholars continued Lemkin's genocide research, and the 1990s saw the creation of an academic journal specific to the field, the Journal of Genocide Research. The major reason for this increase in research, according to Donald Bloxham and A. Dirk Moses, can be traced back to the Rwandan genocide in the 1990s, which showed Western scholars the prevalence of genocide. Despite growth in the preceding decades, it remained a minority school of thought that developed in parallel to, rather than in conversation with, the work on other areas of political violence, and mainstream political scientists rarely engaged with the most recent work on comparative genocide studies. Such separation is complex but at least in part stems from its humanities roots and reliance on methodological approaches that did not convince mainstream political science; in addition, genocide studies are explicitly committed to humanitarian activism and praxis as a process, whereas the earlier generations of scholars who studied genocide did not find much interest among mainstream political science journals or book publishers, and decided to establish their own journals and organizations.

The International Association of Genocide Scholars (IAGS) was created in 1994, with Fein as its first president. Charny credits the plan to create the IAGS with Fein, Robert Melson, Roger W. Smith, and himself meeting at a 1988 Holocaust conference in London in which the four participated in a session on genocides other than the Holocaust.

=== 2000s ===
In the 2000s, the field of comparative genocide studies lacked consensus on the definition of genocide, a typology (classification of genocide types), a comparative method of analysis, and on time frames. Anton Weiss-Wendt describes comparative genocide studies, which include an activist goal of preventing genocide, as having been a failure in genocide prevention.

In 2005, a second international association of genocide scholars, the International Network of Genocide Scholars (INoGS), was created. In 2006, the journal Genocide Studies and Prevention was launched by Charny on behalf of the IAGS.

=== 2010s ===
In the 2010s, genocide scholarship rarely appeared in mainstream disciplinary journals, despite growth in the amount of research.

=== 2020s ===
In the 2020s, Holocaust scholars published their analyses of the allegations of genocide in the October 7 Hamas-led attack on Israel and on the topic of Gaza genocide. Raz Segal and Luigi Daniele argued that a crisis in the overlapping fields of studies occurred, stating, "We argue that the crisis stems from the significant evidence for genocide in Israel's attack on Gaza, which has exposed the exceptional status accorded to Israel as a foundational element in the field, that is, the idea that Israel, the state of Holocaust survivors, can never perpetrate genocide." Omar McDoom, describing the two fields of study together as HGS (Holocaust and genocide studies), observed a split in the HGS community in which "Israel-uncritical" researchers saw "only Hamas [as having] transgressed", while another part of the community saw "both sides [being] engaged in legally and morally problematic violence". McDoom's analysis found "evidence strongly suggestive of bias in favour of Israel" by a part of the community and made recommendations on "ethical obligations and good practices for scholars engaged in public commentary" in the field.

In March 2025, several genocide and holocaust scholars launched the Genocide and Holocaust Studies Crisis Network, on the basis of an open letter undersigned by 400 scholars. Taner Akcam argues that the field must make a "clean break" with those scholars who continue to deny the Gaza genocide.

== Studies on Cultural Genocide ==
Some studies divide genocide into separate types which can impact legal definitions on the subject. A common type of genocide is cultural genocide, which appears in Raphael Lempkin's books. Since Lempkin emphasized that genocide is not simply mass murder, but it also includes a campaign to erase a particular group of people's culture, it could be argued that there is a form of genocide where a people's culture is erased absent from mass murder. This style of genocide would be cultural genocide. The United Nations echoes the divide between a mental and physical aspect to genocide in their definition of the term. However, cultural genocide's exact definition was not provided in the 1948 Convention on Genocide, leaving its definition contested to date. Furthermore, since cultural genocide is not defined, the convention also does not prohibit cultural genocide, leaving only physical forms of genocide policed on the international stage.

The International Criminal Court declared that Al Mahdi was breaking international law by intentionally destroying historical and religious buildings while associated with Al-Qaeda. This case recognized on the international stage the significance of cultural genocide, though it never explicitly charges Al Mahdi with cultural genocide.

On top of the alleged genocide in Gaza, Israel has been accused of committing cultural genocide by erasing aspects of Palestinian culture. During their bombings in Gaza, important historical buildings such as one of the oldest Christian Monasteries have been destroyed. Furthermore, reports of museums and libraries being destroyed by the bombings has increased warnings of an attempted cultural genocide. The International Criminal Court has issued an arrest warrant for the prime minister of Israel, but make no mention of cultural genocide.

== Relation with other fields of inquiry ==
has had a complex relationship with mainstream political science; it has enjoyed renewed research and interest in the last decades of the 20th century and the first decade of the 21st century. It remains a relevant yet minority school of thought that has not yet achieved mainstream status within political science. It received further attraction in the 2010s through the formation of a gender field.

=== Gender field ===
In 2010, the study of genocide connected to gender was a new field of study and was considered as a specialty topic within the broader field of genocide research. The field attracted research attention after the genocides of Bosnia-Herzegovina and Rwanda, in which war crimes tribunals acknowledged that several women were raped and men were sexually abused. Feminist scholars study the differences between males and females during genocide by studying the lives of women survivors during the Holocaust. Similar research on the Armenian genocide has explored the representation of Armenian women as victims with specific focus on the film Ravished Armenia. These studies focus on the power of representations to disempower the object of the representation (as "the Armenian women"). Some scholars argue that representations of rape, when they become disempowering, can be viewed as acts of violence themselves.

== See also ==
- Crimes against humanity
- Genocide Convention
- Genocide education
- Genocide prevention
- International criminal law
- List of genocides
- Outline of genocide studies
- Rwandan genocide
