= Journal of Genocide Research =

- Discipline: Genocide studies
- Language: English
- Edited by: A. Dirk Moses

Publication details
- History: 1999–present
- Publisher: Routledge
- Frequency: Quarterly

Standard abbreviations
- ISO 4: J. Genocide Res.

Indexing
- ISSN: 1462-3528 (print); 1469-9494 (web)
- LCCN: sn99033599
- OCLC no.: 260038904

Links
- Journal homepage; Online access; Online archive

The Journal of Genocide Research is a quarterly peer-reviewed academic journal covering studies of genocide. Established in 1999, for the first six years it was not peer-reviewed. Since December 2005, it is the official journal of the International Network of Genocide Scholars. Previous editors have been Henry R. Huttenbach, Dominik J. Schaller, and Jürgen Zimmerer. The journal is abstracted and indexed in Political Science Abstracts, Historical Abstracts, and America: History and Life. As of 2022, the journal is published by Routledge and the editor-in-chief is A. Dirk Moses (City College of New York).
