= Genocide =

Intentional destruction of a people

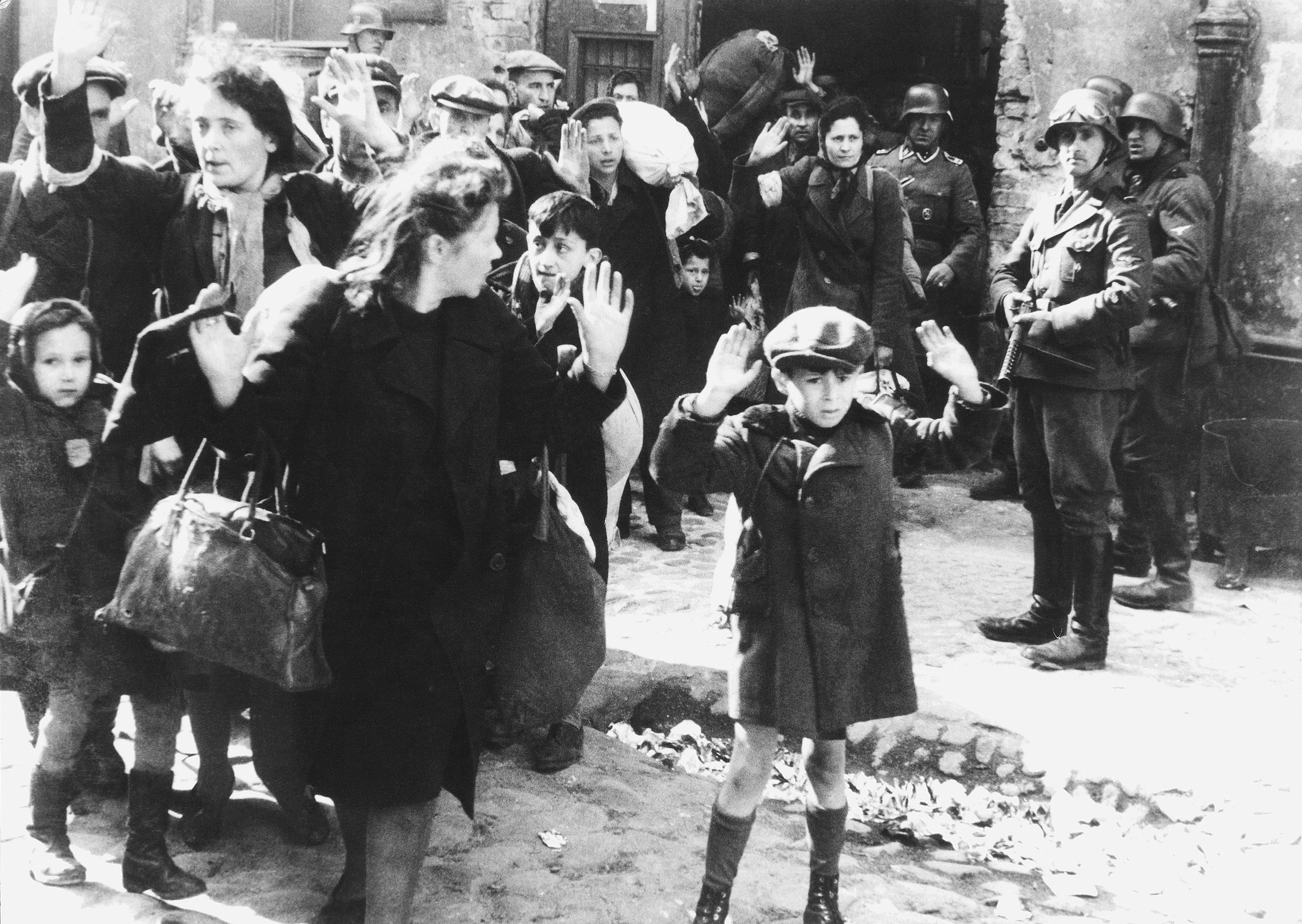
The Holocaust heavily influences the popular understanding of genocide, as mass killing of innocent people based on their ethnic identity.

Genocide is the partial or total destruction of a human group, (Note: Some definitions refer to the targeted group as 'a people', meaning a national, ethnic or religious group, per the Genocide Convention. Other definitions have been proffered, some of which extend this to include political groups, social classes or other substantial human groups.) committed intentionally. The popular view conceives of genocide as the large-scale killing of individuals, but in scholarly and legal fields, genocide occurs when the group itself is targeted. Acts of genocide include killing as well as non-lethal acts such as preventing reproduction among the group, the forcible transfer of children to another group, and cultural genocide.

The term genocide was coined by Polish-Jewish lawyer Raphael Lemkin in the early 1940s. Lemkin lobbied for genocide to be outlawed by international treaty, but the Genocide Convention restricted his initially broad definition to five specific acts "committed with intent to destroy, in whole or in part, a national, ethnical, racial, or religious group, as such." Its definition remains contested by scholars and institutions across international law, history, sociology, and related fields.

Genocide has occurred throughout human history, even during prehistoric times. Most genocides have occurred during wartime, and they are particularly likely in situations of imperial expansion and power consolidation. It is associated with colonialism, especially settler colonialism, as well as with both world wars and repressive governments in the twentieth century. Despite efforts to end genocide, effective interventions have not occurred. The colloquial understanding of genocide is heavily influenced by the Holocaust as its archetype and is conceived as innocent victims being targeted for their ethnic identity alone rather than for any political reason.

Genocide is widely considered to be the epitome of human evil and is often referred to as the "crime of crimes"; consequently, events are often denounced as genocide. It is most often a state crime, and most perpetrators are psychologically normal. Genocide typically occurs when the perpetrators believe themselves to be existentially under threat and is employed as a means to another end—often after other options have failed. The most common pattern of genocidal violence involves the killing of adult men and non-lethal violence, such as sexual assault and enslavement, of women and children. Other common means include forced displacement, land theft, and the destruction of cultural heritage. After genocide, denial and impunity for the perpetrators are common.

== Origins ==
Polish-Jewish lawyer Raphael Lemkin coined the term genocide between 1941 and 1943. Lemkin's coinage combined the Greek word γένος (genos, 'race, people') with the Latin suffix-caedo ('act of killing'). As a law student, his interest in the subject was initially sparked by the Armenian genocide. He submitted the manuscript for his book Axis Rule in Occupied Europe in early 1942, and it was published in 1944 as the Holocaust was coming to light outside Europe. Lemkin's proposal to criminalize genocide was more ambitious than simply outlawing a type of mass slaughter; he thought that the law against genocide could promote more tolerant and pluralistic societies. His response to Nazi criminality was sharply different from that of another international law scholar, Hersch Lauterpacht, who argued that it was essential to protect individuals from atrocities, whether or not they were targeted as members of a group.

According to Lemkin, the central definition of genocide was "the destruction of a nation or of an ethnic group" in which its members were not targeted as individuals but rather as members of the group. The objectives of genocide "would be the disintegration of the political and social institutions, of culture, language, national feelings, religion, and the economic existence of national groups." These were not separate crimes but different aspects of the same genocidal process. Lemkin's definition of nation was sufficiently broad to apply to nearly any type of human collectivity, even one based on a trivial characteristic. He saw genocide as an inherently colonial process, and in his later writings, he analyzed what he described as the colonial genocides occurring within European colonies, including the Soviet and Nazi empires. Furthermore, his definition of genocidal acts, which was to replace the national pattern of the victim with that of the perpetrator, was much broader than the five types that were later enumerated in the Genocide Convention. Lemkin considered genocide to have occurred since the beginning of human history and dated the efforts to criminalize it to the Spanish critics of colonial excesses, Francisco de Vitoria and Bartolomé de las Casas. The Polish court that convicted SS official Arthur Greiser in 1946 was the first to mention the term in a verdict, using Lemkin's original definition.

== Crime ==
=== Development ===
The Genocide of Serbs in the Independent State of Croatia was described as such in 1945 by Raphael Lemkin and at the Nuremberg trials, and largely matches the definition of the 1948 Genocide Convention.

According to the legal instrument used to prosecute defeated German leaders during the Nuremberg trials, atrocity crimes were only prosecutable by international justice if they were committed as part of an illegal war of aggression. The powers prosecuting the trial were unwilling to restrict a government's actions against its own citizens.

Lemkin brought his proposal to criminalize genocide to the newly established United Nations in 1946. Opposition to the convention was greater than Lemkin expected, due to states' concerns that it would lead their own policies—including treatment of indigenous peoples, European colonialism, racial segregation in the United States, and Soviet nationalities policy—to be labeled genocide. Before the convention was passed, the United States, United Kingdom, and the Soviet Union worked to make it unenforceable and applicable to their geopolitical rivals' actions but not their own. Few formerly colonized countries were represented, and "most states had no interest in empowering their victims—past, present, and future".

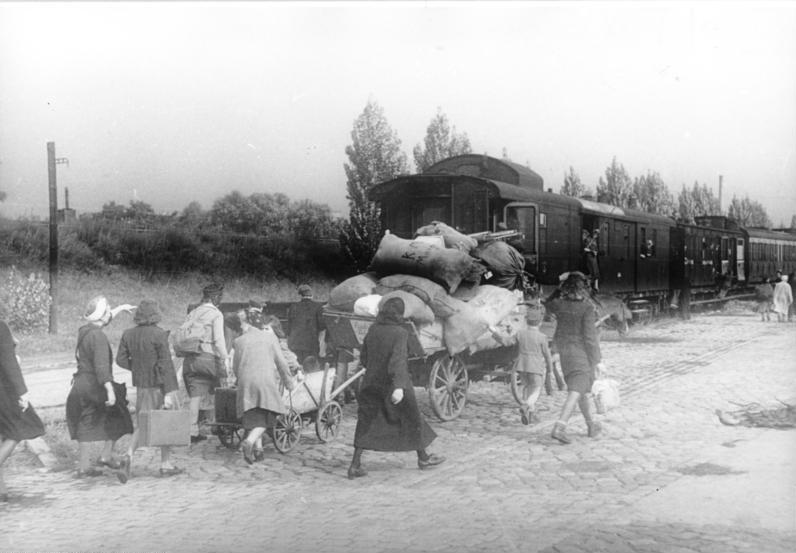
The expulsion of Germans was one of the instances of state violence that was deliberately written out of the legal definition of genocide.

The result narrowed Lemkin's original concept; he privately considered it a failure. Lemkin's anti-colonial conception of genocide was transformed into one that favored colonial powers. Among the violence freed from the stigma of genocide was the destruction of political groups, which the Soviet Union is particularly blamed for blocking. Although Lemkin credited women's NGOs with securing the passage of the convention, the gendered violence of forced pregnancy, marriage, and divorce was left out. Additionally omitted was the forced migration of populations, which had been carried out by the Soviet Union and its allies, condoned by the Western powers, against millions of Germans from central and Eastern Europe. Cultural genocide was also taken out, despite Lemkin's argument that it and physical genocide were two mechanisms aiming at the same goal.

=== Genocide Convention ===
Participation in the Genocide Convention Signed and ratified Acceded or succeeded Only signed

States that accept the International Criminal Court's jurisdiction over genocide in blue

Two years after passing a resolution affirming the criminalization of genocide, the United Nations General Assembly adopted the Genocide Convention on 9 December 1948. It came into effect on 12 January 1951 after 20 countries ratified it without reservations. The convention defines genocide as the following:

... any of the following acts committed with intent to destroy, in whole or in part, a national, ethnical, racial or religious group, as such:

- (a) Killing members of the group;
- (b) Causing serious bodily or mental harm to members of the group;
- (c) Deliberately inflicting on the group conditions of life calculated to bring about its physical destruction in whole or in part;
- (d) Imposing measures intended to prevent births within the group;
- (e) Forcibly transferring children of the group to another group.

A specific intent to destroy is the mens rea requirement of genocide. The issue of what it means to destroy a group "as such" and how to prove the required intent has been difficult for courts to resolve. The legal system has also struggled with how much of a group can be targeted before triggering the Genocide Convention. The prevailing approach to intent is the purposive approach, where the perpetrator expressly wants to destroy the group; there has been some support for a knowledge-based approach, where a person acted with the knowledge that their actions would further an overall genocidal goal. Intent is the most difficult aspect for prosecutors to prove; the perpetrators often claim that they merely sought the removal of the group from a given territory, instead of destruction as such, or that the genocidal actions were collateral damage of military activity.

Attempted genocide, conspiracy to commit genocide, incitement to genocide, and complicity in genocide are criminalized. The convention does not allow the retroactive prosecution of events that took place before 1951. Signatories are also required to prevent genocide and prosecute its perpetrators. Many countries have incorporated genocide into their municipal law, varying to a lesser or greater extent from the convention. The convention's definition of genocide was adopted verbatim by the ad hoc international criminal tribunals and by the Rome Statute that established the International Criminal Court (ICC). The crime of genocide also exists in customary international law and is therefore prohibited for non-signatories.

=== Prosecutions ===
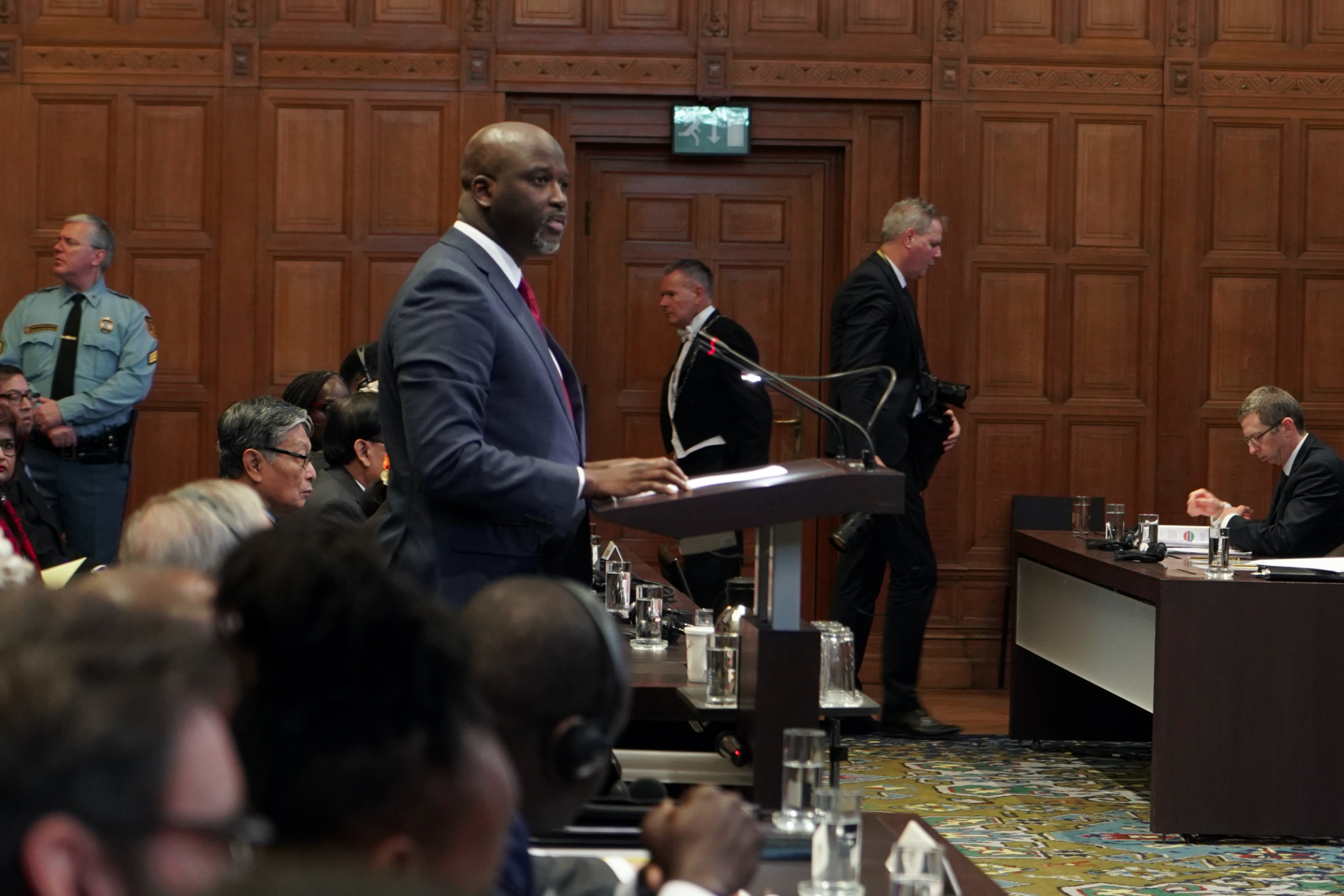
Rohingya genocide case at the International Court of Justice

During the Cold War, genocide remained at the level of rhetoric because both superpowers (the United States and the Soviet Union) felt vulnerable to accusations of genocide and were therefore unwilling to press charges against the other party. Despite political pressure to charge "Soviet genocide," the United States government refused to ratify the convention, fearing countercharges. Authorities have been reluctant to prosecute the perpetrators of many genocides, although non-judicial commissions of inquiry have also been created by some states.

Article III of the Genocide Convention makes attempted genocide punishable alongside genocide, conspiracy to commit genocide, incitement to commit genocide, and complicity in genocide. Yet—unlike those other offences—attempted genocide has drawn little attention in case law or scholarship.

After the failure to prevent the Bosnian and Rwandan genocides in the 1990s, the United Nations established criminal tribunals to try individuals for genocide and other international crimes. Although these tribunals had mixed results, the International Criminal Court was established in 2002 and counts a majority of states as members. Some of the most powerful states in the world, such as the United States, China, India, Russia, and Turkey, have not joined. Other perpetrators have been tried by various countries around the world, either involved in the genocide or not. As with other serious international crimes, no jurisdictional or temporal limitations apply to prosecution. The first former head of state to be convicted of genocide was Khieu Samphan in 2018 for the Cambodian genocide. Although it is widely recognized that punishment of the perpetrators cannot be an order for their crimes, the trials often serve other purposes, such as attempting to shape public perception of the past. There are several cases in which the International Court of Justice has been called upon to adjudicate accusations of genocide against states, including the Bosnian genocide case, the Rohingya genocide case, and the Gaza genocide case.

== Genocide studies ==
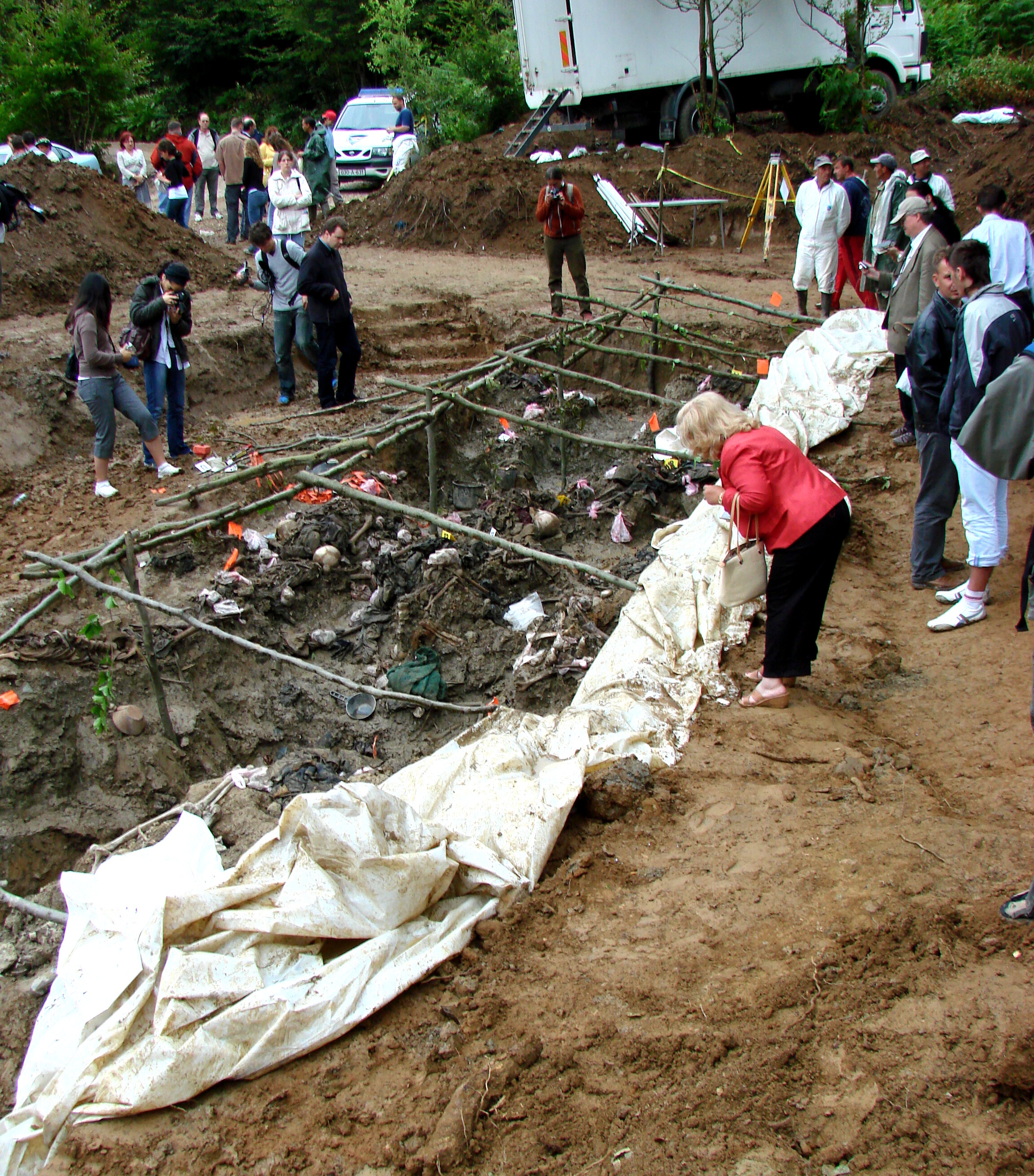
Delegates of the International Association of Genocide Scholars (IAGS) examine an exhumed mass grave, outside the village of Potočari, July 2007.

The field of genocide studies emerged in the 1970s and 1980s, as social science began to consider the phenomenon of genocide. Due to the occurrence of the Bosnian genocide, the Rwandan genocide, and the Kosovo crisis, genocide studies exploded in the 1990s. In contrast to earlier researchers who took for granted the idea that liberal and democratic societies were less likely to commit genocide, revisionists associated with the International Network of Genocide Scholars emphasized how Western ideas led to genocide. The genocides of indigenous peoples as part of European colonialism were initially not recognized as a form of genocide. Pioneers of research into settler colonialism, such as Patrick Wolfe, spelled out the genocidal logic of settler projects in places like the Americas and Australia, prompting a rethinking of colonialism. Nevertheless, most genocide research focuses on a limited canon of twentieth-century genocides, while many other cases are understudied or forgotten. Many genocide scholars are concerned with both the objective study of the topic and obtaining insights that will help prevent future genocides.

=== Definitions ===
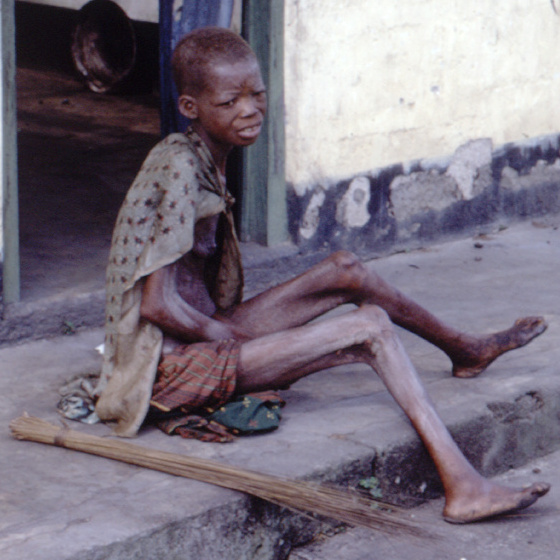
The blockade of Biafra, which resulted in the death of at least 1 million people, was argued not to be genocide because the Nigerian government aimed to suppress rebellion.

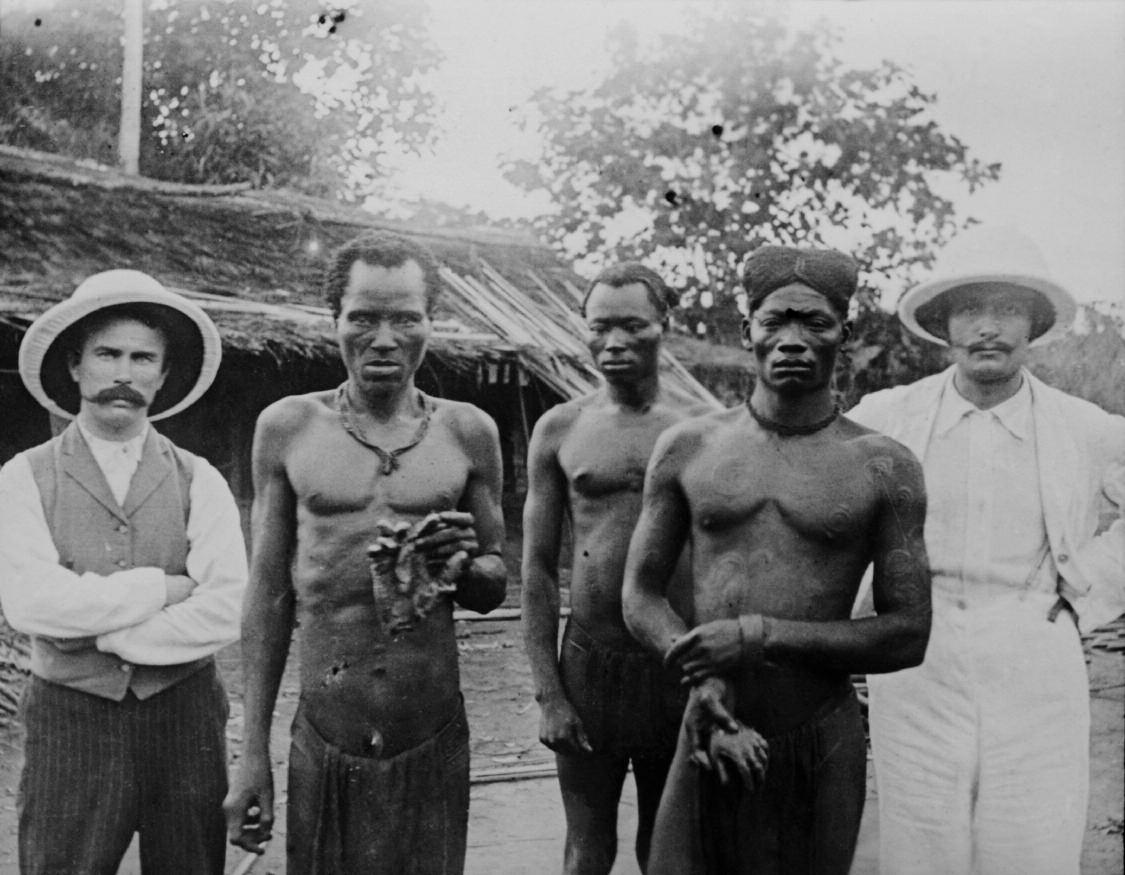
Historians have debated whether the atrocities in the Congo Free State under Leopold II constitute genocide. Despite the significant number of deaths, many historians argue they do not meet the United Nations' 1948 definition of genocide because they are the result of harsh economic exploitation rather than a policy of deliberate extermination.

The definition of genocide generates controversy whenever a new case arises and debate erupts as to whether or not it qualifies as a genocide. Sociologist Martin Shaw writes, "Few ideas are as important in public debate, but in few cases are the meaning and scope of a key idea less clearly agreed." Perceptions of genocide vary between seeing it as "an extremely rare and difficult to prove crime" and one that can be found, couched in euphemistic language, in any history book.

Some scholars and activists use the Genocide Convention definition. Others prefer narrower definitions that reduce genocide to mass killing or distinguish it from other types of violence by the innocence, helplessness, or defencelessness of its victims. Most genocides occur during wartime, and distinguishing genocide or genocidal war from non-genocidal warfare can be difficult. Likewise, genocide is distinguished from violent and coercive forms of rule that aim to change behavior rather than destroy groups. Isolated or short-lived phenomena that resemble genocide can be termed genocidal violence.

Cultural genocide or ethnocide refers to actions targeted at the reproduction of a group's language, culture, or way of life. Although left out of the Genocide Convention, most genocide scholars believe that both cultural genocide and structural violence should be included in the definition of genocide if committed with the intent to destroy the targeted group. Many of the more sociologically oriented definitions of genocide overlap with that of the crime against humanity of extermination, large-scale killing, or induced death as part of a systematic attack on a civilian population. Although included in Lemkin's original concept and by some scholars, political and social groups were also excluded from the Genocide Convention. As a consequence, perpetrators attempt to evade the stigma of genocide by labeling their targets as political or military enemies.

=== Criticism of the concept of genocide and alternatives ===
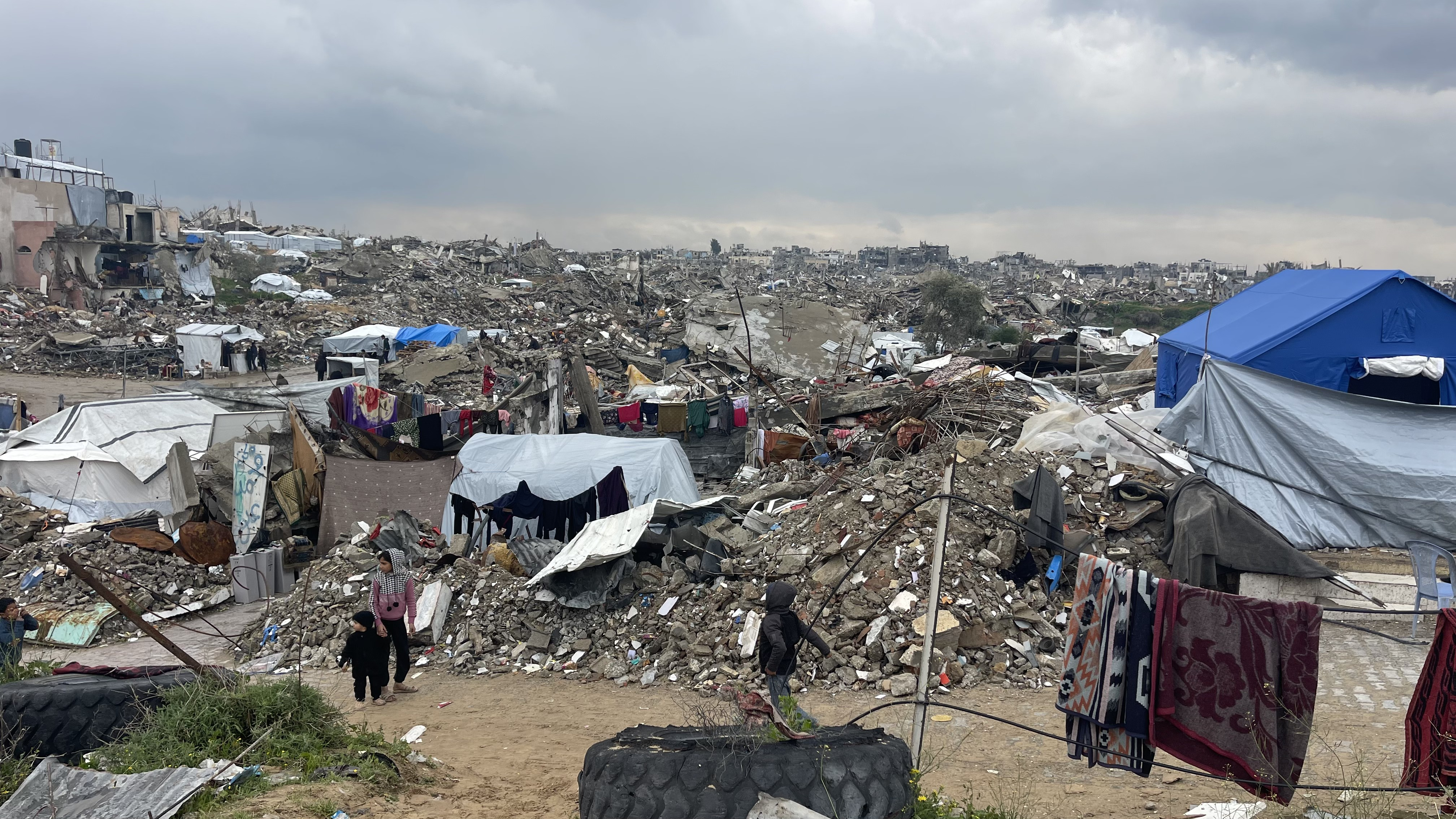
The death of large numbers of civilians as collateral damage of military activity, such as aerial bombings, is excluded from the definition of genocide, even when they make up a significant portion of a nation's population. South Africa has argued that making Gaza uninhabitable (pictured) is an element of the Gaza genocide.

Most civilian killings in the twentieth century were not from genocide. Alternative terms have been coined to describe processes left outside narrower definitions of genocide. Ethnic cleansing—the forced expulsion of a population from a given territory—has achieved widespread currency, although many scholars recognize that it frequently overlaps with genocide, even where Lemkin's definition is not used. Other terms ending in -cide have proliferated for the destruction of particular types of groupings: democide (people by a government), eliticide (the elite of a targeted group), ethnocide (ethnic groups), gendercide (gendered groupings), politicide (political groups), classicide (social classes), and urbicide (the destruction of a particular locality).

The word genocide inherently carries a value judgement, as it is widely considered to be the epitome of human evil. Although genocidal violence has at times been celebrated by its perpetrators and observers, it has always had critics. The idea that genocide sits on top of a hierarchy of atrocity crimes—worse than crimes against humanity or war crimes—is controversial among scholars and suggests that the protection of groups is more important than that of individuals and that the intention of states is more important than the suffering of civilian victims of violence. A. Dirk Moses and other scholars argue that the prioritization of genocide causes other causes of civilian deaths, such as blockades, bombing, and other "collateral damage", to not be considered in the study and response. Gzoyan, Hochmann, and Meyroyan argue that - although criminalized by the Genocide Convention - "attempted genocide" is a rarely invoked concept that should be revitalized by focusing on smaller-scale, intent-driven group attacks.

== Causes ==
We have been reproached for making no distinction between the innocent Armenians and the guilty: but that was utterly impossible in view of the fact that those who are innocent today might be guilty tomorrow. The concern for the safety of Turkey simply had to silence all other concerns.

— Talaat Pasha in Berliner Tageblatt, 4 May 1916

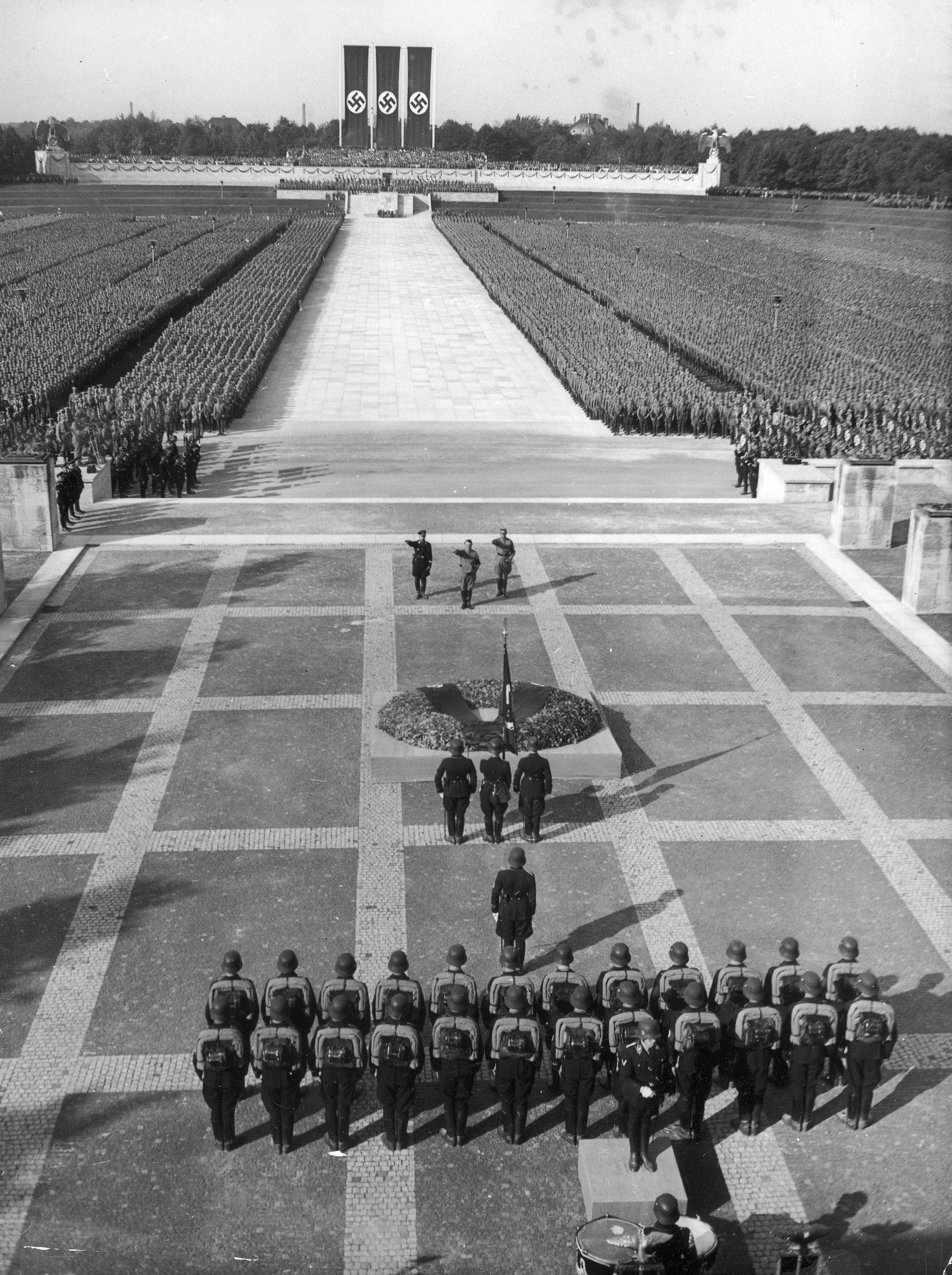
Most genocides are not associated with extreme political ideologies such as Nazism.

The colloquial understanding of genocide, heavily influenced by the Holocaust as its archetype, is conceived as innocent victims targeted because of irrational hatred rather than for any political reason. Genocide is not an end in itself but a means to another end—often chosen by perpetrators after other options fail. War is often described as the single most important enabler of genocide, providing the weaponry, ideological justification, polarization between allies and enemies, and cover for carrying out extreme violence. A large proportion of genocides occurred during the course of imperial expansion and power consolidation. Theories have explored how culture, regime type, societal divides along lines such as ethnicity, and modernization affect genocide, but there is limited evidence. Particular threats to existing elites that have been correlated to genocide include both successful and attempted regime change via assassination, coups, revolutions, and civil wars.

Most genocides are not planned long in advance but emerge through a process of gradual radicalization, often escalating to genocide following resistance by those targeted. Genocide perpetrators often fear—usually irrationally—that if they do not commit atrocities, they will suffer a similar fate as they inflict on their victims. Despite perpetrators' utilitarian goals, ideological factors are necessary to explain why genocide seems to be a desirable solution to the identified security problem. Noncombatants are harmed because of the collective guilt ascribed to an entire people, defined according to race but targeted because of its supposed security threat. The victims are viewed as other and are often deliberately excluded from society before genocide begins through formal measures such as the denial of citizenship.

Although many scholars have emphasized the role of ideology in genocide, there is little agreement on how ideology contributes to violent outcomes. Another debate concerns whether genocide is caused by aberrant political ideology or if there is, in fact, a great deal of continuity between genocidal and ordinary political ideologies. Early research focused on radical revolutionary ideologies, such as Nazism, Stalinism, and Maoism, as the cause of genocide. Although such regimes have produced some of the most extreme mass killings, relatively few genocides are associated with them and even those that are were not necessarily committed because of the regime's revolutionary goals. Some scholars have emphasized moral disengagement as an ideological cause of atrocities, but contrary to this theory, many perpetrators defend their crimes on moral grounds, citing vengeance, loyalty, and duty.

A revision of the above theories emphasizes the use of normal moral categories, such as self-defense and the punishment of criminals, to justify genocide. As self-defense is the most widely recognized justification for violence, the victims of genocide are usually perceived as a threat by the perpetrator, even though they are unarmed civilians. Most genocides are ultimately caused by their perpetrators perceiving an existential threat to their own existence, although this belief is usually exaggerated and can be entirely imagined. The victims of genocide are demonized as traitors, criminals, and enemies of the people; they are scapegoated for various forms of wrongdoing—real or imagined—that make the genocide seem like a just punishment or revenge. Other scholars have cited rational explanations for atrocities, such as material self-interest in the form of theft and land grabbing.

== Victims ==
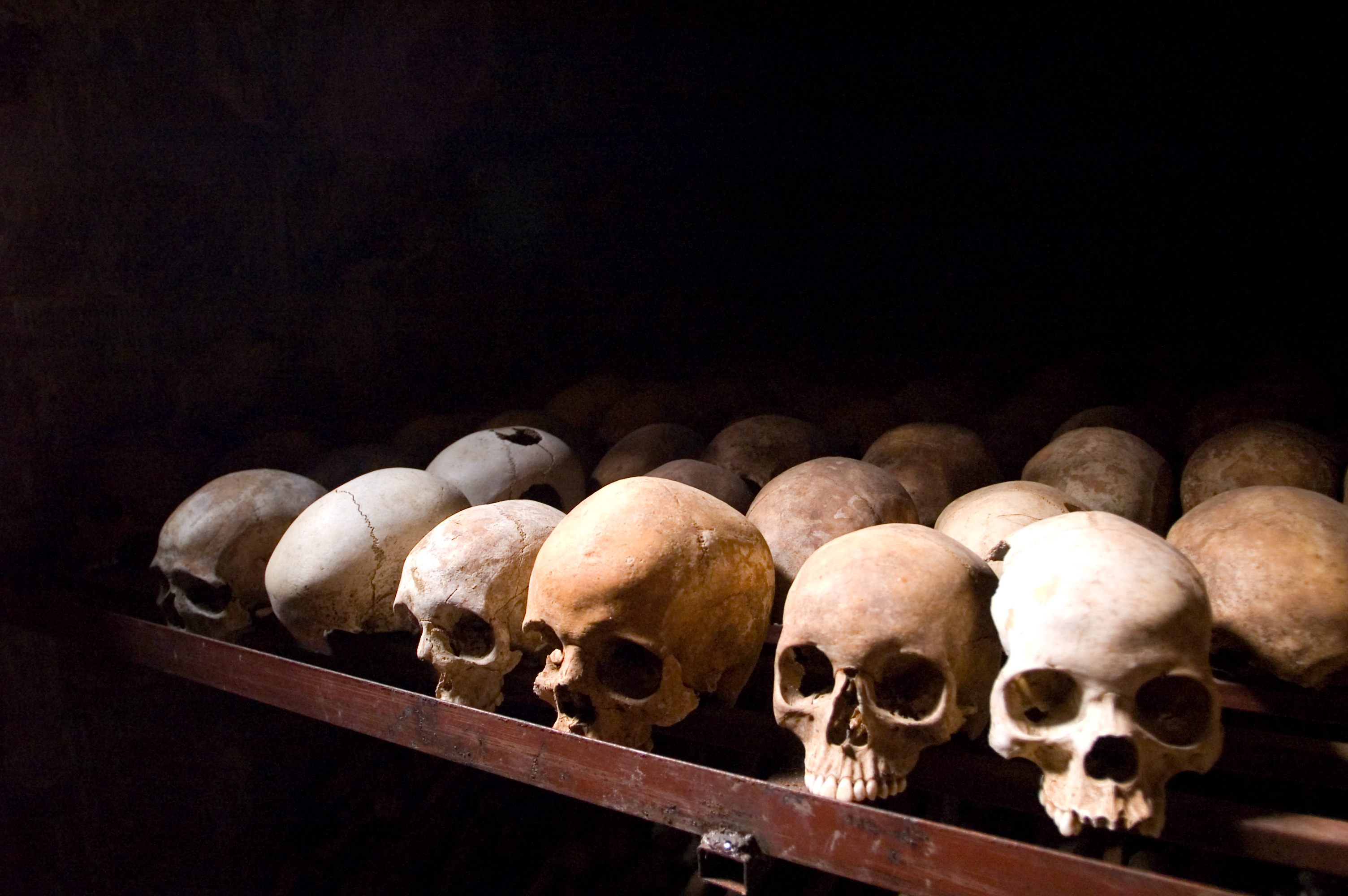
Human skulls representing the victims of the Rwandan Genocide

Victims of genocide are targeted not as individuals, but because they comprise members of a national, ethnic, racial, or religious group marked for destruction. They are often portrayed by perpetrators as an existential threat to the nation—scapegoated as fifth columnists, "criminals," or "enemies." Patterns of violence commonly include the selective killing of adult men to eliminate resistance, alongside wide-ranging non-lethal abuses against women and children such as sexual violence, enslavement, and the forcible transfer of children. Many victims also suffer indirect forms of destruction—forced displacement, starvation, deprivation of basic needs, and the razing or theft of homes—along with attacks on culture, identity, language, and heritage. Survivors frequently face lasting trauma, displacement, and the added burden of denial and impunity after the violence ends, even as they seek recognition, justice, and repair. If the victim group of genocide engages in armed resistance, it may be differentially treated by international observers. Protracted armed resistance by the intended victims is characteristic of many genocides, often used by perpetrators and others to either justify the genocidal actions or challenge the charge of genocide.

== Perpetrators ==
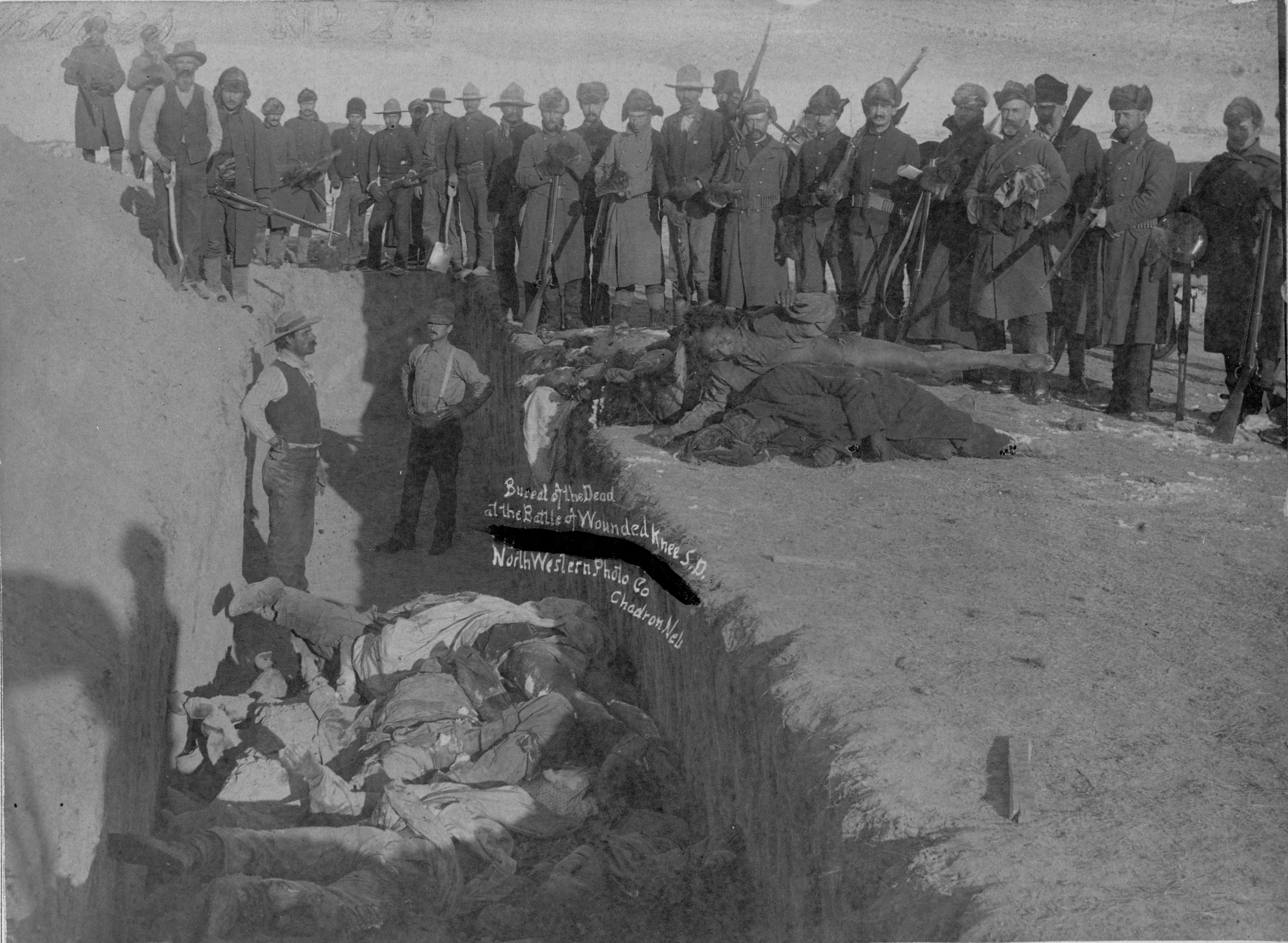
Wounded Knee Massacre perpetrators burying the dead. Several of them received medals for heroism.

Genocides are usually driven by states via their agents, such as elites, political parties, bureaucracies, armed forces, and paramilitaries. Existing research blames elites for the decision to commit genocide and state structure for the ability to carry it out, including bureaucratic diffusion of responsibility. Organizers of genocide usually believe that their actions were justified and regret nothing. The military is often the leading perpetrator, as soldiers are already armed, trained to use deadly force, and required to obey orders. Another common strategy is for state-sponsored atrocities to be carried out in secrecy by paramilitary groups, offering the benefit of plausible deniability while widening complicity in the atrocities. Civilians may be the leading agents when the genocide takes place in remote frontier areas. The role of society in genocide is not well understood.

How ordinary people can become involved in extraordinary violence under circumstances of acute conflict remains poorly understood. The foot soldiers of genocide (as opposed to its organizers) are not demographically or psychologically aberrant. People who commit crimes during genocide are rarely true believers in the ideology behind genocide, although they are affected by it to some extent alongside other factors such as obedience, diffusion of responsibility, and conformity. Other evidence suggests that ideological propaganda is not effective in inducing people to commit genocide and that, for some perpetrators, the dehumanization of victims and adoption of nationalist or other ideologies that justify the violence occurs after they begin to perpetrate atrocities, often coinciding with escalation. Although genocide perpetrators have often been assumed to be male, the role of women in perpetrating genocide—although they were historically excluded from leadership—has also been explored. People's behavior changes over the course of events, and someone might choose to kill one genocide victim while saving another.

== Methods ==
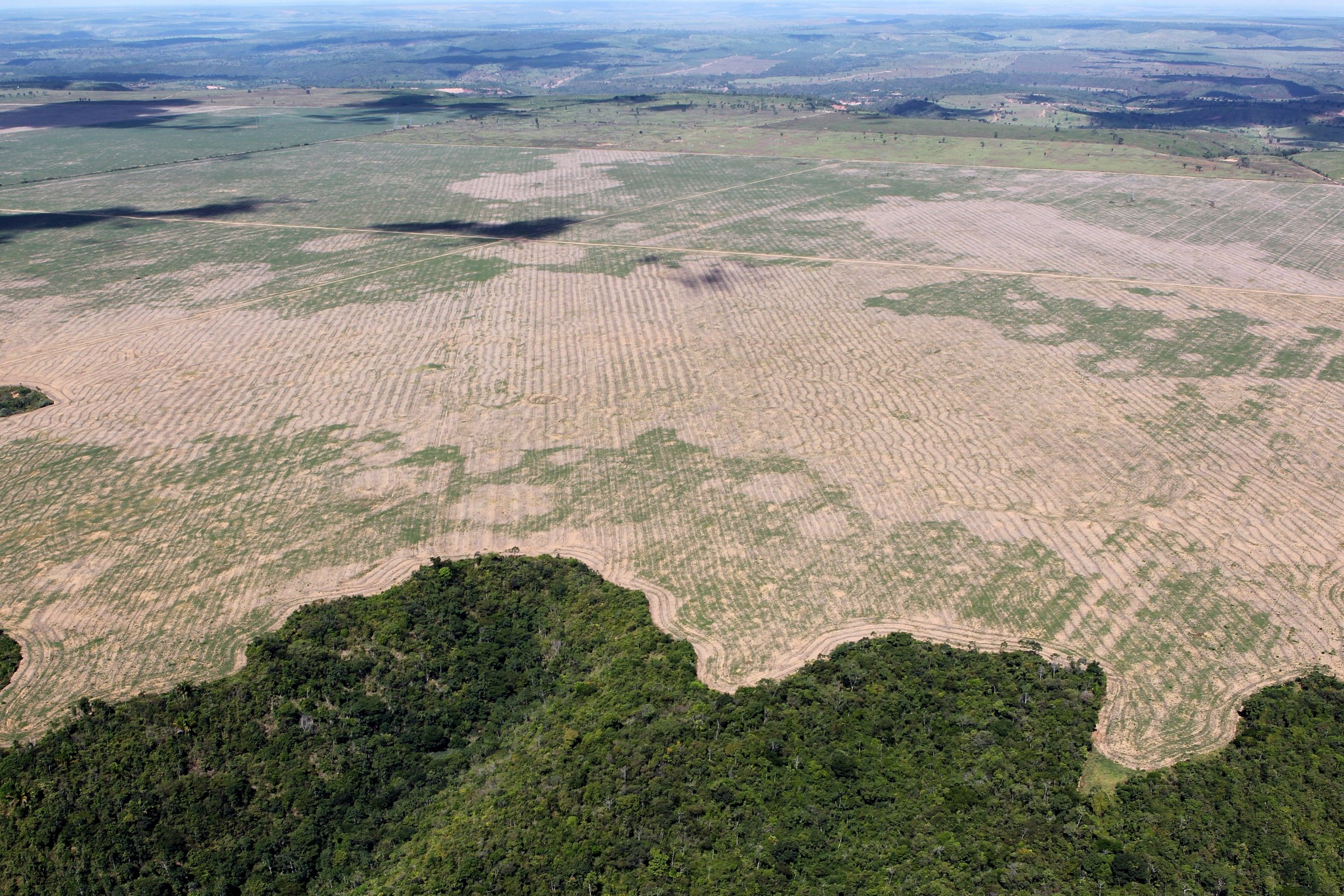
The destruction of the environments in which they live, such as in the case of the deforestation of the Amazon, has been argued to be a form of genocide of indigenous peoples.

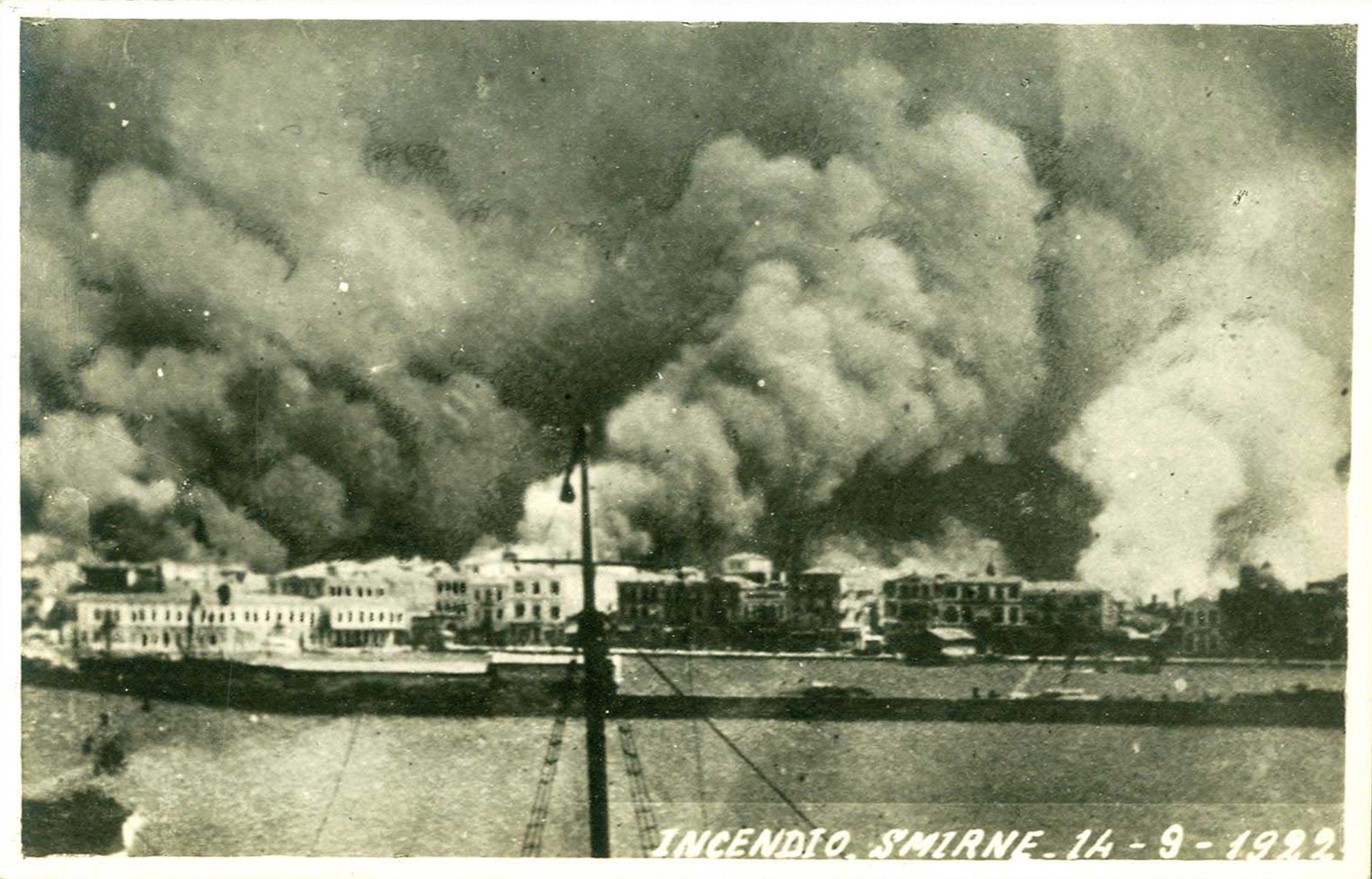
The burning of Smyrna. Genocide often entails the physical destruction of the victims' homes.

The Genocide Convention recognizes five distinct genocidal acts:

- killing members of the group,
- causing serious bodily or mental harm to members of the group,
- deliberately inflicting on the group conditions of life calculated to bring about its physical destruction in whole or in part,
- imposing measures intended to prevent births within the group, and
- forcibly transferring children of the group to another group.

The UN Commission of Experts that convened on the Bosnian Genocide defined various ethnic cleansing practices—torture, arbitrary arrest, extrajudicial executions, sexual violence, confinement of civilian population, forcible displacement, military attacks or threats of attacks on civilians, and wanton destruction of property—stating that "such acts could also fall within the meaning of the Genocide Convention."

Men, particularly young adults, are disproportionately targeted for killing before other victims to stem resistance. Although diverse forms of sexual violence—ranging from genocidal rape, forced pregnancy, forced marriage, sexual slavery, mutilation, and forced sterilization—can affect either males or females, women are more likely to face it. The combination of the killing of men and sexual violence against women is often intended to disrupt the reproduction of the targeted group.

The weapons of genocide are varied and flexible, with perpetrators' strategies varying based on the technology available. The invention of deadlier weapons enabled more systematic forms of destruction (for example, using gas chambers in the Holocaust versus relying on harsh desert conditions in the Herero genocide). A countervailing tendency is to avoid appearing like the stereotypical genocide by employing more selective violence, such as drone warfare.

=== Non-lethal means ===
Although the popular view conceives of genocide as involving mass killing, according to many definitions, it may occur without victims suffering physical harm. Scholars who focus on the relationship between colonialism and genocide document other means of group destruction and devastation: indigenous land theft, forced labor, environmental destruction, apartheid, and other forms of systemic discrimination. Indirect forms of killing include starvation and the deprivation of other basic needs such as water, clothing, shelter, and medical care.

Forced displacement is also a common feature of many genocides, with the victims transported, deported, or expelled. People are often killed by the displacement itself, as was the case for many Armenian genocide victims, and their homes are razed or stolen. Although definitions vary, cultural genocide usually refers to tactics that target a group by means other than attacking its physical, biological existence. It encompasses attacks against the victims' language, religion, cultural heritage, political and intellectual leaders, and traditional lifestyle, and is commonly encountered even in cases where it is not the primary means of group destruction. Along with the abduction of children from the victimized group, such as residential schools, cultural genocide is particularly common during settler-colonial consolidation. Perpetrators often deny Indigenous groups' existence and identity.

== Reactions ==
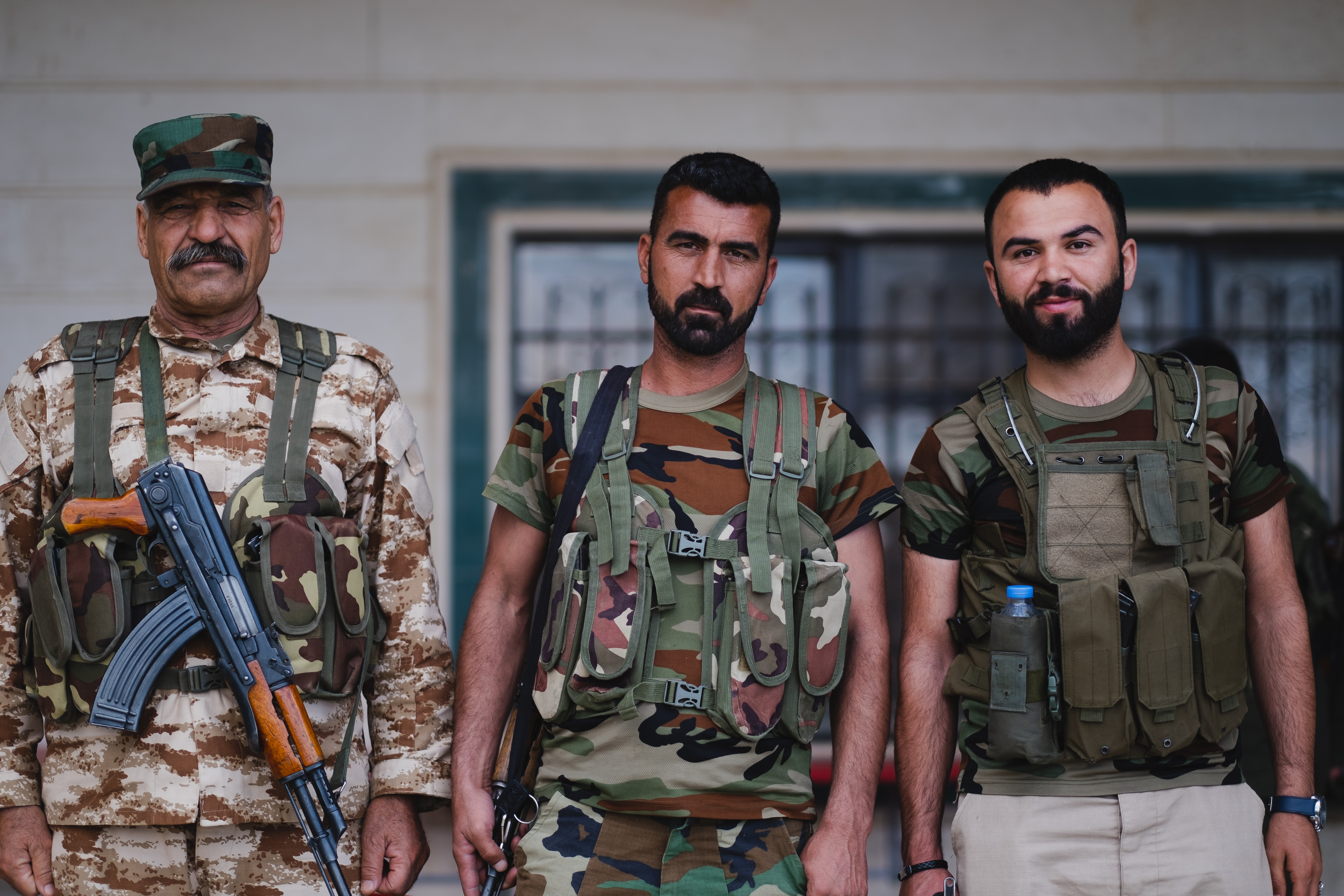
Yazidi members of the Êzîdxan Protection Force at a base in the Sinjar Mountains. The Êzîdxan Protection Force was formed in response to the Yazidi genocide.

Historically and even after the ratification of the Genocide Convention, genocide was considered a sovereign privilege in which foreign intervention would be inappropriate. More recently, the prevention of genocide has come to be seen as a goal, but this has not translated into effective intervention. Although several organizations compile lists of states where genocide is considered likely to occur, the accuracy of these predictions is not known, and there is no scholarly consensus over evidence-based genocide prevention strategies. Intervention against genocide has often been considered a failure due to most countries' prioritization of business, trade, and diplomatic relationships: as a consequence, "the usual powerful actors continue to use violence against vulnerable populations with impunity."

The responsibility to protect is a doctrine that emerged around 2000, in the aftermath of several genocides around the world, that seeks to balance state sovereignty with the need for international intervention to prevent genocide. However, disagreements in the United Nations Security Council and a lack of political will have hampered its implementation. Although military intervention to halt genocide has been credited with reducing violence in some cases, it remains deeply controversial and is usually illegal. Researcher Gregory H. Stanton found that calling crimes genocide rather than something else, such as ethnic cleansing, increased the chance of effective intervention. Almost all genocides are brought to an end either by the military defeat of the perpetrators or the accomplishment of their aims.

== History ==
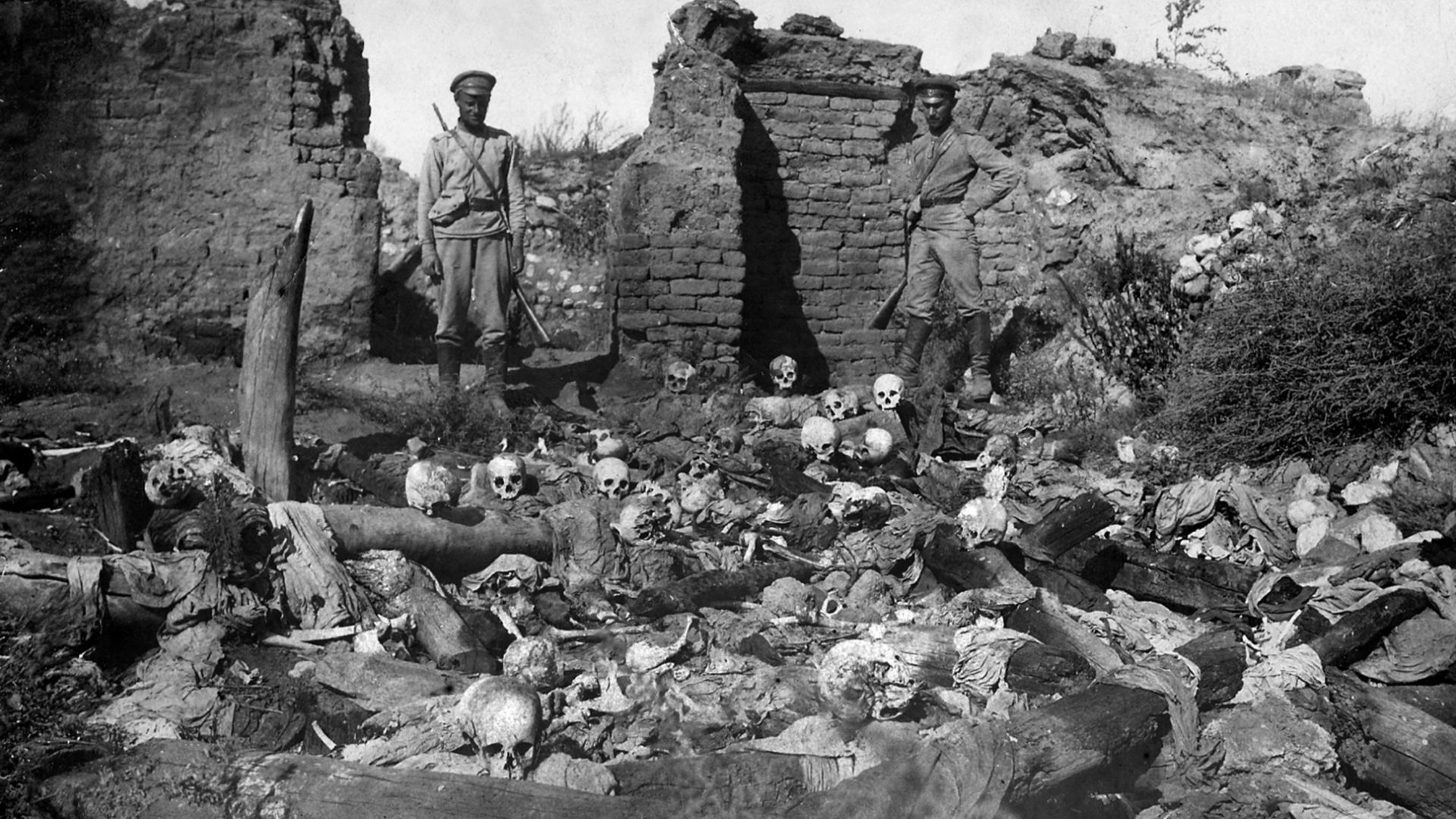
Remains of victims of the Armenian genocide in the former Armenian village of Sheykhalan near Mush, 1915

Lemkin applied the concept of genocide to a wide variety of events throughout human history. He and other scholars date the first genocides to prehistoric times. Before the advent of civilizations consisting of sedentary farmers, humans lived in tribal societies, with intertribal warfare often ending with the obliteration of the defeated tribe, killing of adult males, and integration of women and children into the victorious tribe. Ancient sources, like the Hebrew Bible, contain events that have been cited as describing genocide. The massacre of men and the enslavement or forced assimilation of women and children—often limited to a particular town or city rather than applied to a larger group—is a common feature of ancient warfare as described in written sources. The events that some scholars consider genocide in ancient and medieval times had more pragmatic than ideological motivations. As a result, some scholars, such as Mark Levene, argue that genocide is inherently connected to the modern state—thus to the rise of the West in the early modern era and its expansion outside Europe—and earlier conflicts cannot be described as genocide.

Although all imperial rule depends on violence, empires generally seek to preserve and rule the conquered rather than eradicate them. Alternatives to genocide might include integration (via enslavement or otherwise) or exile. Although the desire to exploit populations could disincentivize extermination, genocide occurred in response to resistance by the conquered. Ancient and medieval genocides were often committed by empires. Unlike traditional empires, settler colonialism—particularly the settlement of Europeans outside of Europe—is characterized by militarized populations of settlers in remote areas beyond effective state control. Rather than labor or economic surplus, settlers want to acquire land from indigenous people, making genocide more likely than with classical colonialism. While the lack of law enforcement on the frontier ensured impunity for settler violence, the advance of state authority enabled settlers to consolidate their gains using the legal system.

The twentieth century has often been referred to as the "century of genocide." It was committed on a large scale during both world wars. The prototypical genocide, the Holocaust, involved such large-scale logistics that it reinforced the impression that genocide was the result of civilization drifting off course and required both the "weapons and infrastructure of the modern state and the radical ambitions of the modern man." After the horrors of World War II, the United Nations attempted to proscribe genocide via the Genocide Convention. Despite the promise of "never again" and the international effort to outlaw genocide, the practice has continued to occur. The Cold War included the perpetration of mass killings by both communist and anti-communist states, although these atrocities usually targeted political and social groups, therefore not meeting the legal definition of genocide. The 1990s saw a surge of ethnic violence in the former Yugoslavia and Rwanda that led to a resurgence in interest in genocide. In the twenty-first century, new communications technologies have also transformed genocide, with both perpetrators and victims able to communicate instantly across borders and raise transnational support.

== Effects and aftermath ==
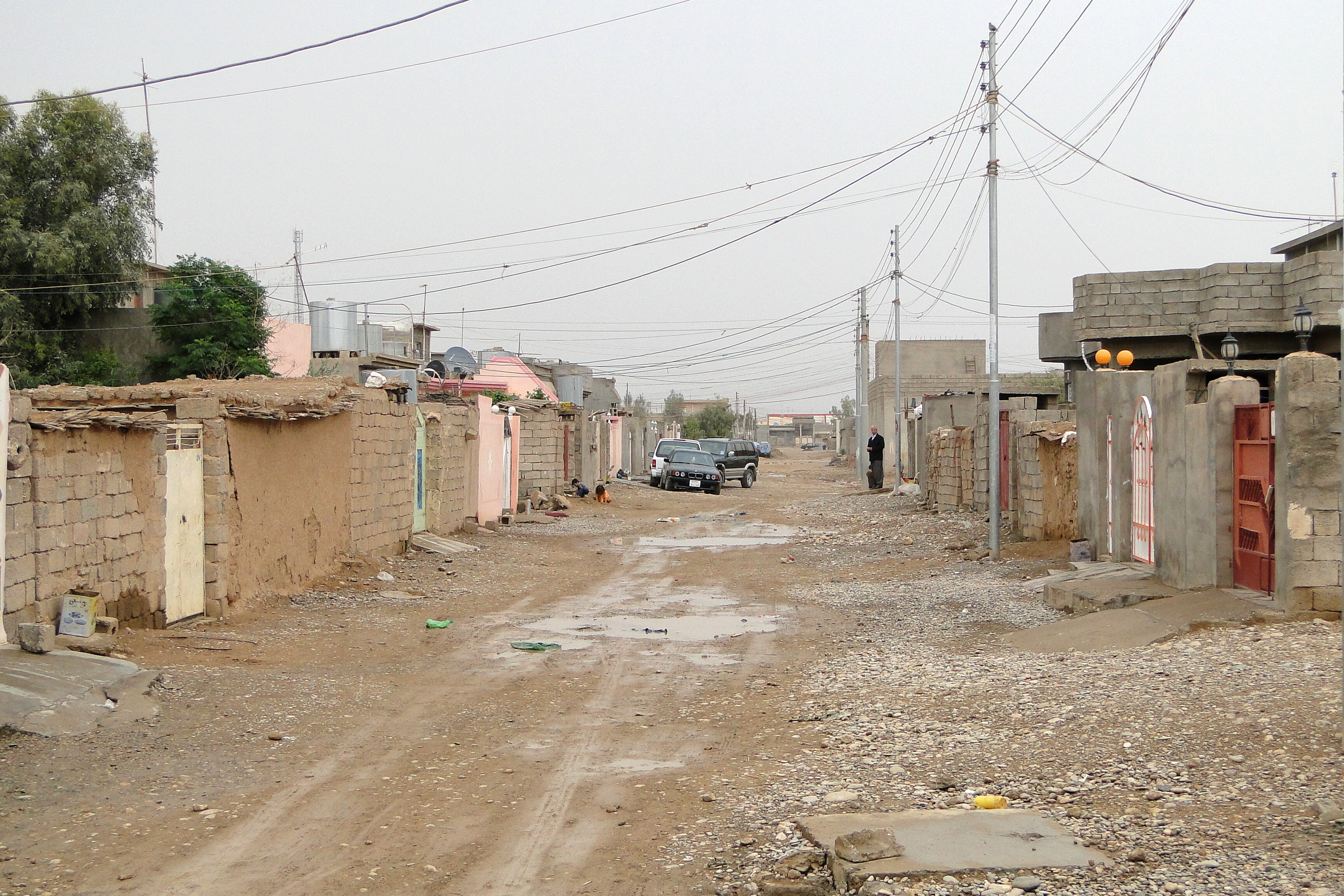
Relocation camp for survivors of the Anfal genocide

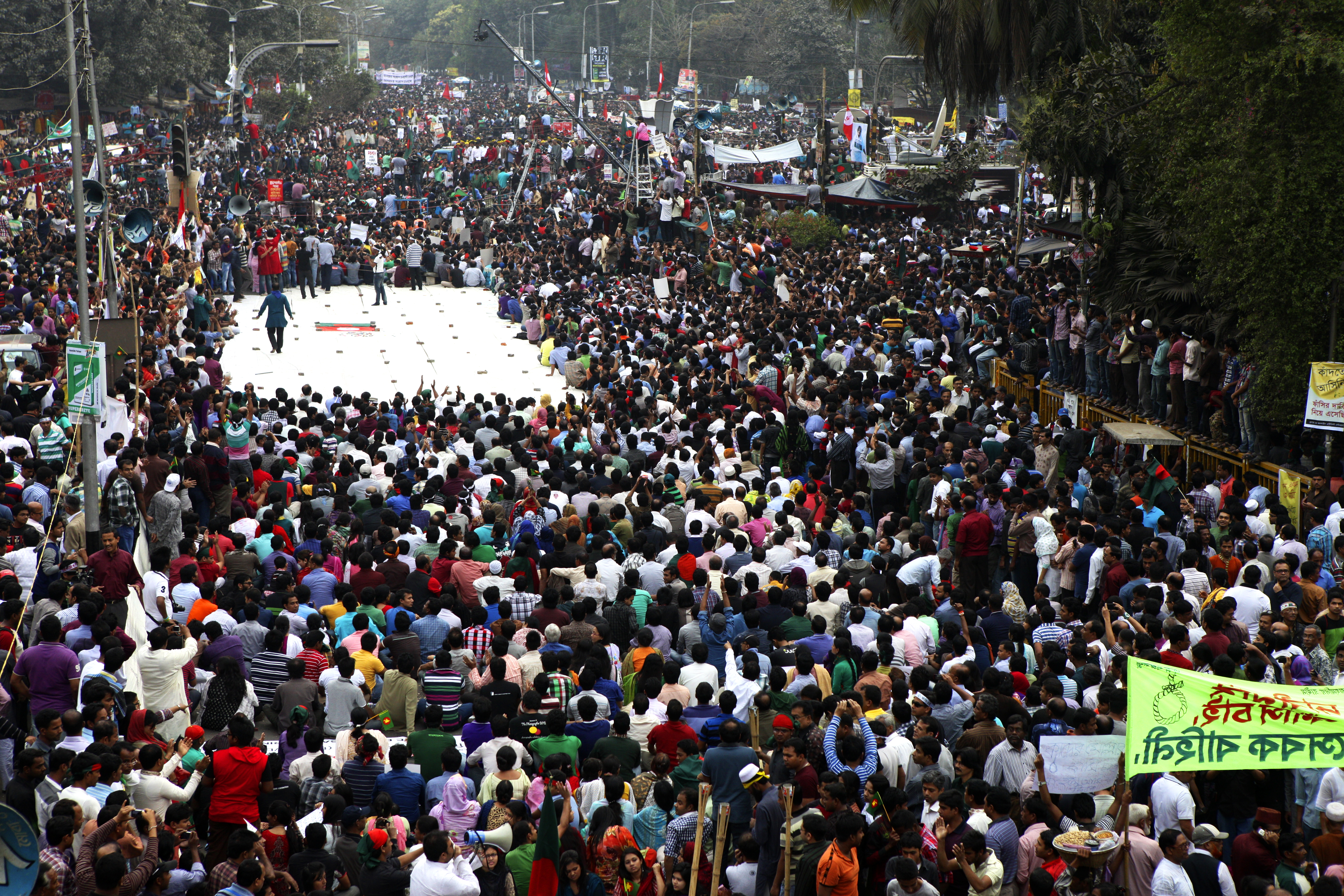
A 2013 protest calling for the execution of perpetrators of the 1971 Bangladesh genocide

In the aftermath of genocide, many survivors attempt to prosecute perpetrators through the legal system and obtain recognition and reparations. Except where the perpetrators were militarily defeated—for example, following the Holocaust and the Rwandan genocide—they usually evade accountability. Most of the states that have perpetrated genocide and their citizens deny or ignore it, reject responsibility for the harms suffered by victims, and want to draw a line under the past. Even acknowledgements of victims' suffering remain elusive, although such acknowledgements improve relations between perpetrator and victim groups, as well as with third parties.

Genocide not only affects victim and perpetrator groups but also those who benefited from or observed it. The effects of genocide on societies are under-researched. Much of the qualitative research on genocide has focused on the testimonies of victims, survivors, and other eyewitnesses. Studies of genocide survivors have examined rates of depression, anxiety, schizophrenia, suicide, post-traumatic stress disorder, and post-traumatic growth. While some have found negative effects, others find no association with genocide survival. There are no consistent findings that children of genocide survivors have worse health than comparable individuals. Most societies can recover demographically from genocide, but this is dependent on their position early in the demographic transition. In the aftermath of genocide, many survivors experience forced displacement from their homes and may face additional challenges due to being labeled as immigration offenders. Success at rebuilding lives in another country is high, despite survivors' limited resources upon arrival.

Because genocide is often perceived as the "crime of crimes," it grabs attention more effectively than other violations of international law. Consequently, victims of atrocities often label their suffering as genocide as an attempt to gain attention to their plight and attract foreign intervention. In popular culture, victims of genocide are often endowed with moral superiority while perpetrators are demonized, which can flatten the ethical complexity of real-world conflicts. Although remembering genocide is often perceived as a way to develop tolerance and respect for human rights, the charge of genocide often leads to increased cohesion among the targeted people—in some cases, it has been incorporated into national identity—and stokes enmity towards the group blamed for the crime, reducing the chance of reconciliation and increasing the risk of future occurrence of genocide. Some genocides are commemorated in memorials or museums. Lemkin believed that genocide harmed the entire world because of the loss of cultural outputs from the targeted group.

== See also ==
- Demographic engineering
- Eliminationism
