= Genocide–ecocide nexus =

Connection of environmental and human destruction

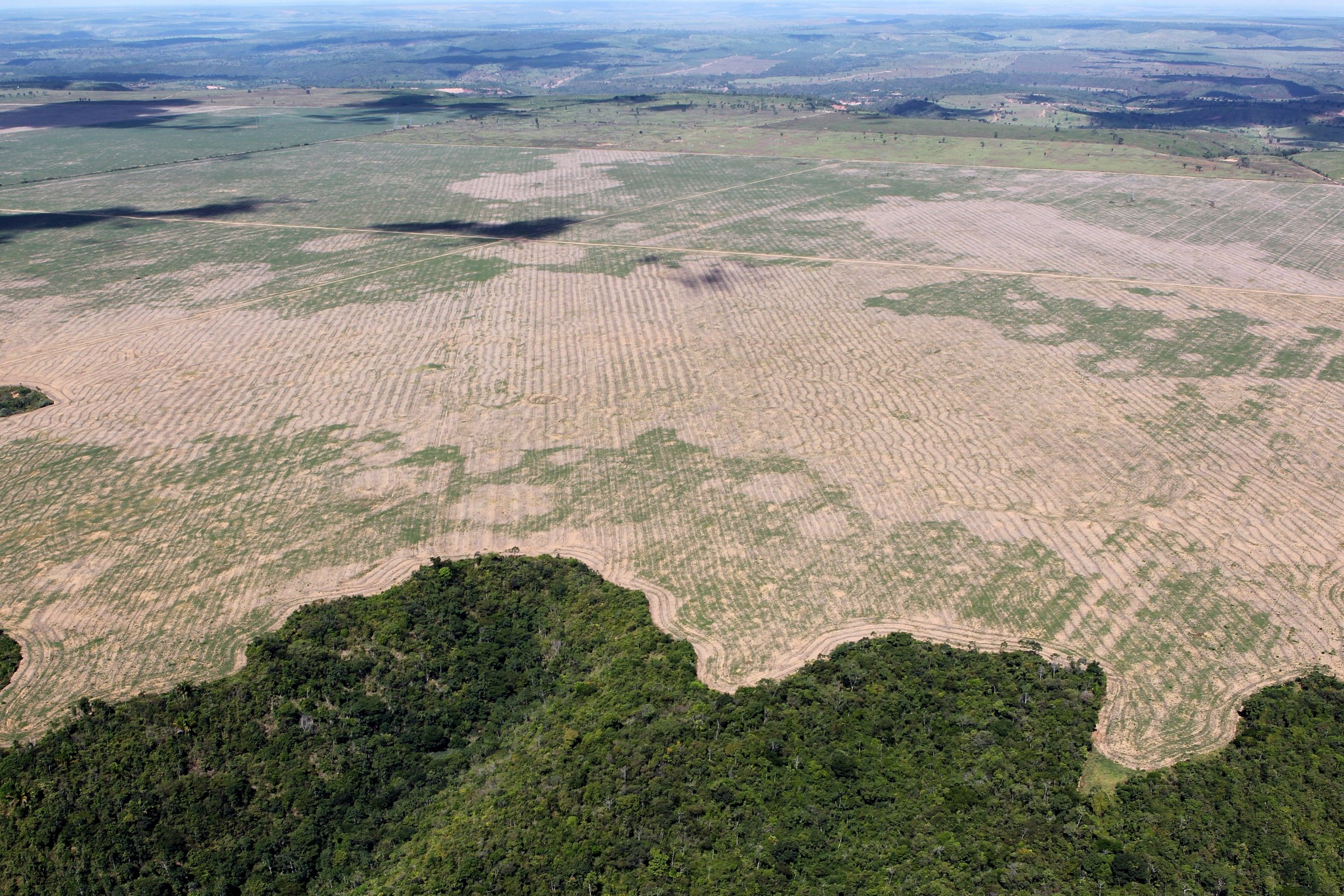
Deforestation of the Amazon

The genocide–ecocide nexus is the connection between ecocide (destruction of the environment) and genocide (destruction of a people). Ecocide can be a means of genocide, when "environmental destruction results in conditions of life that fundamentally threaten a social group's cultural and/or physical existence", and makes future genocides more likely. It is particularly relevant in discussions of genocide of indigenous peoples.

Many of the scholars writing about genocide and ecocide use Raphael Lemkin's original definition of genocide. When ecological destruction is responsible for genocide, it occurs in systemic and structural form, often over many decades or centuries, that is not easy to pin on the specific intention of a particular actor. When ecocide leads to genocide, it often looks more like social death than physical extermination. For example, genocide scholar Tony Barta referred to the "remorseless pressures of destruction inherent in the very nature of the society". Insights from settler-colonial studies, critical race theory, and critical Indigenous studies, are also used to explore the genocide–ecocide nexus.

It is argued that processes such as natural resource extraction and techno-capitalist development are behind ecocide and ecocide-related genocides. Ecocide often leads to genocide when it occurs on the edges of capitalist expansion into indigenous economies, preceded by land expropriation that both enables capitalist exploitation of the land in question and severs indigenous people from their previous way of subsistence.

== History ==
The historical precedent for a link between genocide and ecocide can be seen through examinations of the Vietnam War and the US military's use of Agent Orange. Professor Galston, a biologist, made a speech comparing the wilful destruction of people and culture from the Second World War with the destruction of the environment during the Vietnam War. The methods of warfare used in the Vietnam War destroyed the flora with the loss of plant life and soil contamination, the humans in the long run, and the fauna with biodiversity loss. Environmental destruction can take three forms: destruction caused by mass violence, the conduct of mass violence causing destruction, and long-term environmental destruction can be a barrier for peace. Environmental destruction caused by mass violence can correlate directly to the use of Agent Orange during the Vietnam War. The environment was deliberately attacked with the intent to target a population. During the war, there was a clear willingness to use the dioxin-contaminated agent on the environment of Vietnam, with the intent to destroy the human adversaries. The target was the environment, but such environmental neglect impacts human rights, welfare and can cause more conflict.

Genocide is the willful destruction of people, and ecocide is the willful destruction of the environment, also known as non-human actors. The genocide-ecocide nexus comes through in the connection found between humans and non-human actors, such as the environment. Damage to the human aspect of a conflict is also damage to the environmental aspect. Something that is not often discussed, despite humans depending on their environment and nature for life and cultural development. A social group, which can be destroyed through the act of genocide, is not simply a collection of individuals, but rather a complex set of relationships that interconnect. Lemkin’s definition of genocide and the removal of culture from the definition of genocide left the concept misunderstood by scholars and the law. Early discussions of ecocide came about through a necessity of wartime disasters; the term ecocide was, in the early years of its conception, only associated with wartime situations that caused harm to the environment. The correlation between genocide and ecocide comes through the form of culture, and the cultural connections to the land that people hold. Those cultural connections to the land, if destroyed, can have genocidal impacts.

The genocide-ecocide nexus is further analyzed through the lens of capitalism, the modern institutions that govern the world and Marxist ecology, which summarizes that capitalism is blind as it divides nature and is unable to see the drivers of ecological destruction and climate change. The modern institutions of the global world can be a perspective used to explain the modern genocide and ongoing ecological destruction. Ecocide has yet to be formally recognized as an international crime, with discussions taking place in 2025 for approaches to accountability regarding the environment. Various movements exist to bring awareness to ecocide, such as The Eradicating Ecocide campaign started by lawyer and environmentalist Polly Higgins. The campaign is working with organizations such as Stop Ecocide International as part of a joint project to raise awareness of ecocide, human impacts on the environment, and up-to-date news. Stop Ecocide International focuses on recognizing long-term environmental harm as an international crime through expert advice on ecocide law.

== Examples ==
Examples of cases where genocide and ecocide are said to be connected include the draining of the Mesopotamian Marshes in 1991, deforestation of the Amazon, genocides of Colombian indigenous peoples, genocide in Sudan, and the Gaza genocide.

=== Indigenous peoples ===
The genocide-ecocide nexus can be seen through Indigenous peoples who have an ongoing history with colonialism that forcibly altered their lives, leading to social and cultural deaths. The Indigenous Peoples were unable to carry out traditional activities and maintain relationships, not only among themselves but with the land and other nonhuman nature around them. The connection comes through the physical and cultural destruction that the Indigenous Nations faced as they were removed from their lands, the destruction of nature, including animal species that hold cultural significance, such as the beaver and the bison and the alteration of the landscape. Deforestation, damming of rivers, and human activity leading to the introduction of new pollutants cause further destruction to the nonhuman nature. The ongoing contemporary experience of living under settler-states that have not fully decolonized their worldview of Indigenous peoples and their culture feeds into this modern genocidal nexus. Indigenous Knowledge Systems (IKS) is an understanding that relationships are not only among people, but among all living things. Indigenous culture exists in proximity with the nonhuman world, nature is often viewed as a community member and the destruction of these nonhuman community members is seen as a type of death. Destruction of the environment has an impact on the Indigenous communities who rely on the health of the local environment for their own well-being, but also for cultural well-being. The Indigenous ecology holds that all nature has a personhood, further perpetuates the notion that destroying the environment is genocide.

== See also ==
- Scorched earth

== Bibliography ==
- Crook, Martin (2024). Capitalism, Colonisation and the Ecocide-Genocide Nexus. University of London Press. ISBN 978-1-912250-58-5.
