= Blockade of Biafra =

1967–70 event in the Nigerian Civil War

- Part of the Nigeria–Biafra War
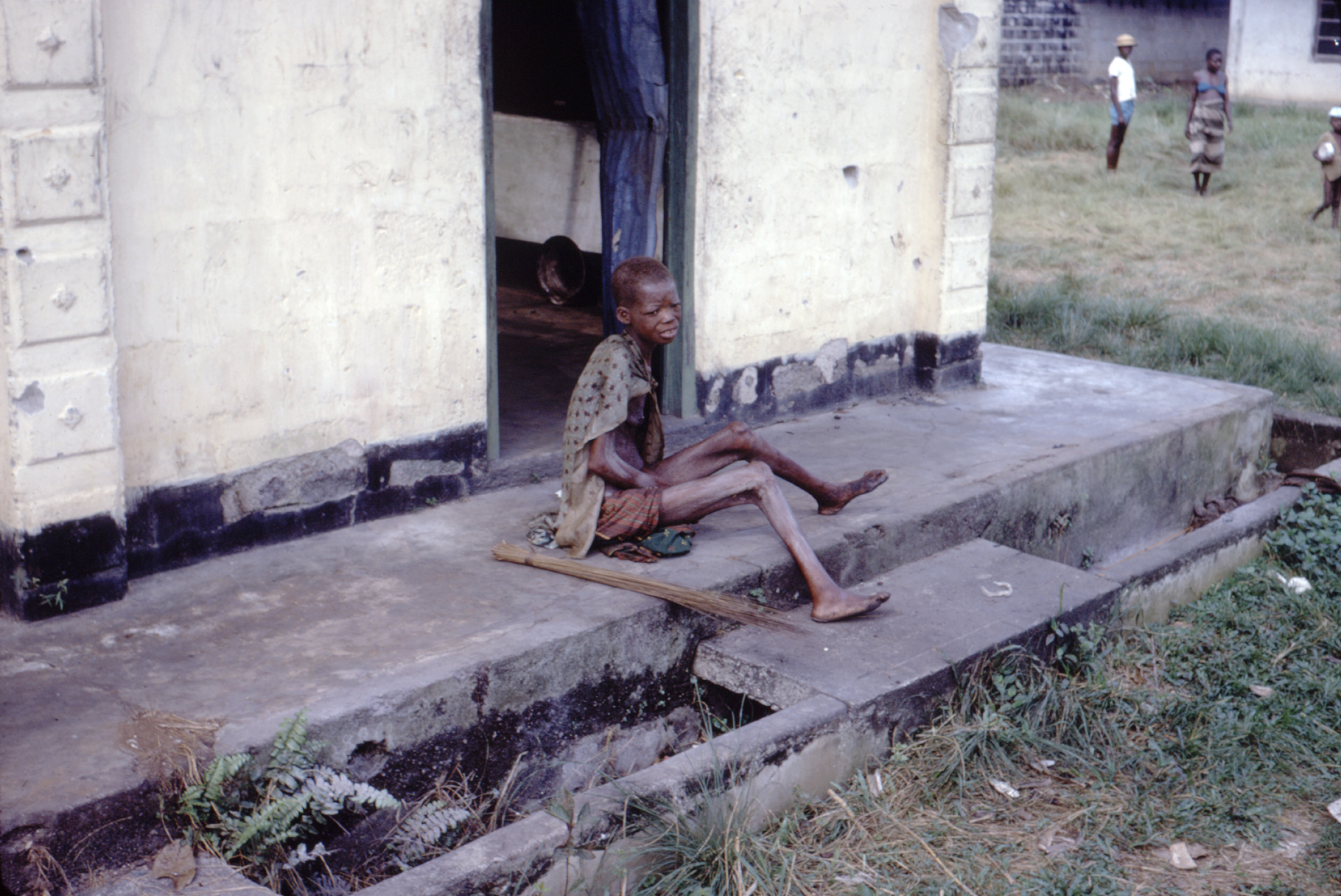
- Starving local during the blockade of Biafra
- Location: Biafra
- Date: 1967 – 1970
- Target: Biafran people
- Attack type: Starvation
- Deaths: 500,000–4 million
- Perpetrator: Nigeria's military forces
- Motive: To pressure and destabilize the Biafran government and either force them to surrender or for the state to collapse: Anti-Igbo sentiment; Anti-Christian sentiment; Ethnic cleansing; Genocidal intent

The blockade of Biafra or Biafran genocide was a blockade by the Nigerian federal government during the Nigerian Civil War (1967–1970) that resulted in a famine that led to at least 4 million casualties, and ended with the capitulation of the secessionist state of Biafra.

The blockade and the ensuing humanitarian crisis stimulated worldwide mobilization and widespread debate about the concept of genocide and whether or not it was appropriate to designate the events which occurred in Biafra as a genocide. Ultimately, it contributed to reform in the law of blockade to protect civilians and the prohibition of starvation as a method of warfare in the 1977 amendments to the Geneva Conventions.

== Background ==
The Republic of Biafra in June 1967, when it declared its independence from the rest of Nigeria

In the aftermath of the 1966 Nigerian counter-coup, anti-Igbo pogroms erupted across northern Nigeria, killing thousands of Igbos. Chukwuemeka Odumegwu Ojukwu declared the independence of Biafra in the Igbo-populated areas of Nigeria in 1967, and the federal government led by Yakubu Gowon launched a civil war against the secessionist entity.

== The blockade ==
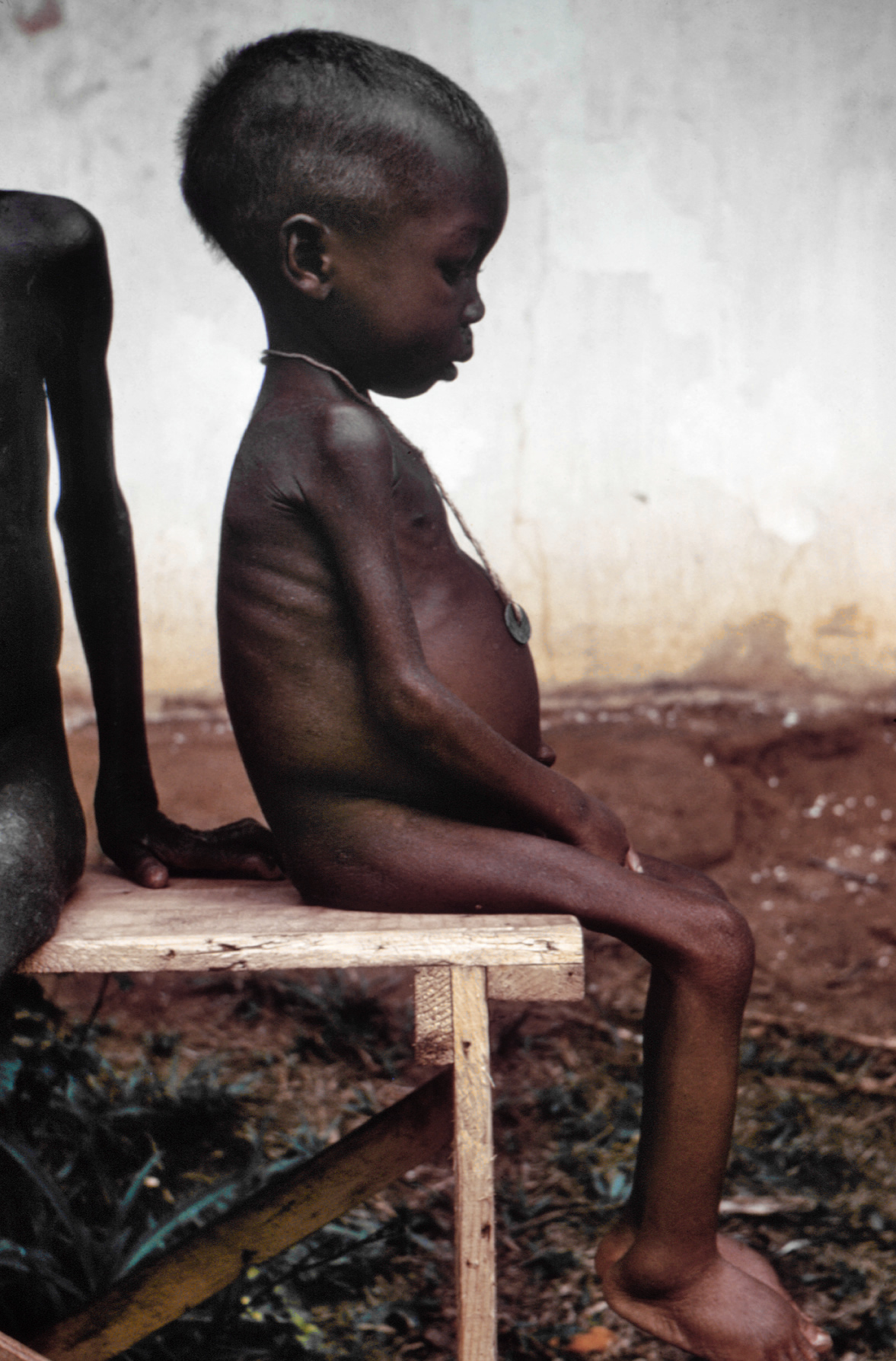
Starving child during the blockade

During the first weeks of the war, the Nigerian government decided to impose a blockade of Biafra. Access to the secessionist republic through foreign currency transactions, mail and telecommunications, and all seaports and airfields was to be cut off. Initially it was unclear whether the blockade of the 200 miles (320 km) coast would be effective with the ships available to the Nigerian Navy, and whether the Nigerian Air Force would be able to interdict the air routes. Nevertheless, the blockade was effective and maintained for the next two and a half years. The Nigerian government relied on international law to enforce the blockade, since at the time starvation as a weapon of war was not prohibited and all neutral countries were obliged to abide by an announced blockade. The Nigerian government threatened reactions against countries that disregarded the blockade and made an agreement with Cameroon to obstruct Biafra's land border. Some smugglers attempted blockade running but two ships were destroyed by the Nigerian navy.

The blockade interdicted food, medicine, and other supplies needed by civilians. Nigerian federal leaders obstructed the passage of relief supplies and stated that starvation was a deliberate tactic of war, although also dismissing reports of famine as Biafran propaganda.

All is fair in war, and starvation is one of the weapons of war. I don't see why we should feed our enemies fat, only to fight us harder.

— Obafemi Awolowo, vice chairman of the Federal Executive Council and Commissioner of Finance

I want to see no Red Cross, no Caritas, no World Council of Churches, no Pope, no missionary and no UN delegation. I want to prevent even one Ibo having even one thing to eat before their capitulation.

— Brigadier Benjamin Adekunle

The Biafran government rejected daylight aid flights and proposed an alternative neutral aid corridor with a neutral airfield that would be exclusively used for aid. 2 Ojukwu argued that the proposal he rejected would allow the Nigerian government to poison Biafrans and enable the bombing of Biafra. Essentially, Ojukwu argued that Nigeria's proposal was weaponizing aid, and to prevent this, the aid should be completely handled by neutral observers and transported through neutral routes. However, some argue that his reason was to preserve the clandestine routes from which Biafra continued to import arms and ammunition. Ultimately, Nigeria rejected his proposal. It is estimated that one million or more people died as a result of the blockade. Most of the war casualties were civilians particularly children, who were especially vulnerable to malnutrition.

Another consequence of the blockade was a rise in violent crime in Biafra.

== International reactions ==
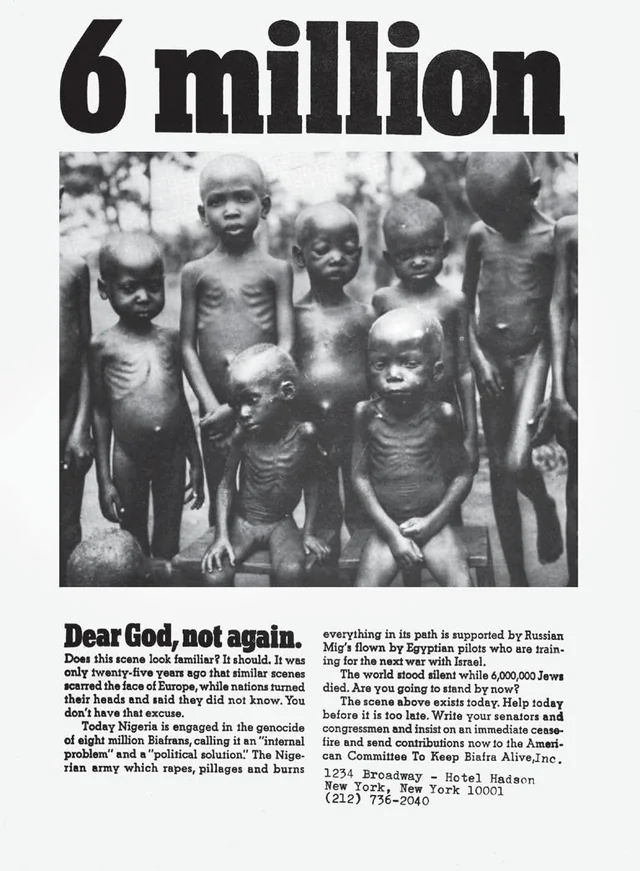
Poster by the American Committee to Keep Biafra Alive

Biafra attracted a large amount of international attention from mid-1968, when images of starving Biafran children began to appear in the international press. Biafran propaganda compared Igbo to Jews and the blockade of Biafra to the Holocaust. Initially, international public opinion was sympathetic to Biafran claims, but shifted after the United Kingdom sent a fact finding mission to Nigeria that reported that genocide was not occurring. Some scholars have criticized the fact finding mission for not properly investigating the genocide claims. The mission only investigated where Nigeria allowed them to investigate. Additionally, the mission dismissed rape by Nigerian soldiers as “enforced marriage”. Some historians argue that the lack of accountability for the blockade and targeting of humanitarian workers enabled future weaponized famines, including the blockade of Gaza.

The U.N. Convention specifies that Genocide can be “in part or in whole”. Some scholars, such as Robert Melson, argue that there should be a distinction between partial genocide and total genocide. As a result, Melson chose to characterize Biafra as a “partial genocide” or a “genocidal massacre” rather than a whole genocide.

The largest organization in the United States that formed in reaction to the Biafra war was the American Committee to Keep Biafra Alive. In West Germany the war resulted in an unprecedented mobilization and the amount of money raised, 70 million marks, exceeded that previously raised for any humanitarian cause. Some relief organizations, including the ICRC, only operated with the permission of both belligerents, limiting relief efforts.

Relief efforts were cut off in June 1969 when a Swedish Red Cross plane was shot down by Nigerian government forces.

== Legacy ==
Soon after the civil war ended in 1970, it was largely forgotten outside Nigeria and not much about it was mentioned in the field of genocide studies. The ICRC recognized that the failure of its relief effort was due in part to the blockade law endorsed by the Western powers, and increased its efforts to secure stronger legal protections for civilians. According to the 1977 Protocol II, "objects indispensable to the survival of the civilian population" are protected and attacks against them are prohibited.

In Nigeria, the blockade and its casualties were ignored in official commemorations and school curricula. In 2021, President of Nigeria Muhammadu Buhari made tweets alluding to the war, which were deleted for promoting violence; subsequently, Twitter was banned in Nigeria.

Cohort studies suggest that the famine had long-term health impacts on survivors. Specifically, research indicates that early-life exposure to famine is associated with a significantly increased risk of hypertension in adulthood. Sex-based differences were observed in the risk profiles: the risk of hypertension was highest among females.

== Sources ==
- Heerten, Lasse (2017). The Biafran War and Postcolonial Humanitarianism: Spectacles of Suffering. Cambridge University Press. ISBN 978-1-107-11180-6.
- Moses, A. Dirk (2021). The Problems of Genocide: Permanent Security and the Language of Transgression. Cambridge University Press. ISBN 978-1-009-02832-5.
- Mulder, Nicholas; van Dijk, Boyd (2021). "Why Did Starvation Not Become the Paradigmatic War Crime in International Law?". Contingency in International Law: On the Possibility of Different Legal Histories. Oxford University Press. pp. 370–. ISBN 978-0-19-289803-6.
