= Tony Barta =

Australian historian and genocide scholar

Tony Barta (born 1942) is a historian and genocide scholar based in Australia. He is an Adjunct Research Fellow in History at La Trobe University in Melbourne, Australia. His research on Nazi history and genocide in Australian history has contributed to the historical study of settler colonialism and genocide studies.

== Life and career ==
He was born in New Zealand in 1942, where his parents had fled after Hitler seized control over Austria. He attended the Free University in Berlin and studied politics and history. He completed his master's in history from the University of Otago in New Zealand.

He was appointed to La Trobe University's new history department in 1969, where he taught European history and established the History and Film Programme. He was among the first to involve students in filmmaking as a component of their historical studies.

He was a keynote speaker at the 2014 conference of the International Organization of Genocide Scholars.

== Research ==
A major theme of Barta's scholarship is the relationship between colonisation and genocide, particularly in 19th-century Australia. His theses regarding the effects of colonialism on Indigenous people helped the genocide of Indigenous Australians get more recognition. His research interests include 20th-century Germany, particularly the relations between history, media, and genocide in colonial societies; social life, culture, and idealogy. Bloomsbury describes his writing on genocide in Australia and Nazi Germany as having established an international reputation. His work is mentioned in Dan Stone's overview volume of genocide studies, The Historiography of Genocide (2008).

His 1985 article After the Holocaust: Consciousness of genocide in Australia is considered a pioneering work. According to Oliver Haag, Barta was the first to systematically apply the term genocide to the Australian context.

Additionally, he has long-standing projects on the town of Dachau as an example of 20th-century German history and the function of drama and documentaries on television and film in fostering historical awareness.

== Selected works ==
- Barta, Tony. (1985). After the Holocaust: Consciousness of genocide in Australia. Australian Journal of Politics & History, 31(1), 154–161. https://doi.org/10.1111/j.1467-8497.1985.tb01330.x
- Barta, T. (2005). Mr Darwin’s shooters: on natural selection and the naturalizing of genocide. Patterns of Prejudice, 39(2), 116–137. https://doi.org/10.1080/00313220500106170
- Barta, T. (2011). Discourses of genocide in Germany and Australia: a linked history. Aboriginal History Journal, 25, 37–56. https://doi.org/10.22459/ah.25.2011.03
- Barta, T. (2015). Liberating Genocide: An Activist Concept and Historical Understanding. Genocide Studies and Prevention, 9(2), 103–119. https://doi.org/10.5038/1911-9933.9.2.1335
- Barta, T. (2023b). A very British genocide. In: Cambridge University Press eBooks (pp. 46–68). https://doi.org/10.1017/9781108765480.003
- Barta, Tony. (2026). The destruction of peoples. In Bloomsbury Publishing Plc eBooks. https://doi.org/10.5040/9781474205399
