= Genocide by attrition =

Form or aspect of genocide

Genocide by attrition is the prohibited act of "deliberately inflicting on the group conditions of life calculated to bring about its physical destruction in whole or in part". The concept was introduced by Raphael Lemkin in 1944, while the term was coined by Helen Fein in 1997.

Lemkin described this process as "racial discrimination in feeding." The concept corresponds to Article II of the 1948 Genocide Convention Article II (c) "deliberately inflicting on the group conditions of life calculated to bring about its physical destruction in whole or in part." Elyse Semerdjian notes the inclusion of this article into the Geneva Convention was informed by the extreme deprivation of Jews in the Warsaw Ghetto.

Multiple genocide scholars note that the concept of "genocide by attrition" is useful insofar as it illustrates that genocide is a process rather than a singular event like mass murder. Elyse Semerdjian states that "Genocide by Attrition seeks to conceal the perpetrator’s role in pulling the trigger. By doing so, it emboldens the perpetrator to frame mass starvation as a natural disaster or a generalized tragedy."

Cases of genocide by attrition include Azerbaijan's siege of Armenians in Nagorno-Karabakh, Egypt and Israel's blockade of Gaza, the German Hunger Plan, and the mass killings by Europeans of the buffalo in the Great Plains.
