= Greek Caucasus Division =

Pontic Greek military unit of the Imperial Russian Army

- Ελληνική Μεραρχία του Καυκάσου
- Active: 12 December 1917 – 28 May 1918
- Country: Russian Republic
- Branch: Russian Army (from 1917)
- Type: Infantry
- Size: ~3,000 personnel
- Engagements: World War I: Caucasus Campaign

Commanders
- Notable commanders: Michael Ananiadis

Greek genocide

Background
- Young Turk Revolution, Ottoman Greeks, Pontic Greeks, Ottoman Empire

The genocide
- Labour battalions, Death march, Pontic Greek genocide, Phocaea massacre, Evacuation of Ayvalik, İzmit massacres, 1914 Greek deportations, Tekâlif-i Milliye, Samsun deportations, Amasya trials, Burning of Smyrna

Resistance and rescue
- Greek resistance during the Greek genocide, Seventh Battle of Dazli, Anton Pasha, Kotza Anastas, Efkleidis Kourtidis, Habil Bey

Foreign aid and relief
- Relief Committee for Greeks of Asia Minor, American Committee for Relief in the Near East, Asa Jennings, Esther Pohl Lovejoy, Pope Benedict XV, Pope Pius XI, Tokei Maru

Responsible parties
- Young Turks or Committee of Union and Progress; Three Pashas: Talat, Enver, Djemal; Bahaeddin Şakir, Teskilati Mahsusa or Special Organization, Nureddin Pasha, Topal Osman, Mustafa Kemal Atatürk

See also
- Greco-Turkish War (1919–1922), Greeks in Turkey, Population Exchange, Greek refugees, Armenian genocide, Assyrian genocide, Diyarbekir genocide, Istanbul trials of 1919–1920, Malta Tribunals

The Greek Caucasus Division (Greek: Ελληνική Μεραρχία του Καυκάσου), was a division of the Russian Army composed of ethnic Greeks from the Caucasus and Pontus regions during World War I. Formed in the closing stages of the Caucasus Campaign, it protected the local Greek population from attacks by Muslim militias and the Ottoman army. It was disbanded a year later as a result of the Treaty of Poti.

== Background ==
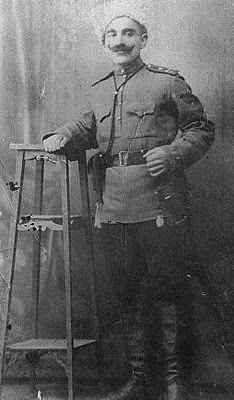
Caucasus Greek officer from the Kars Oblast

The earliest artifacts belonging to the ancient Greek civilization ever found in Pontus date back to 1,000 BC. Most Greek colonies were established on the Pontus coast around 800 BC, with settlers originating from Ionia. By the time of the foundation of the Persian Mithridatic Kingdom of Pontus in 281 BC, the area had been thoroughly Hellenized. The conquest of the Pontic kingdom by the Roman Empire and its subsequent transition into the Byzantine Empire led to the Christianization of the region. Pontus was incorporated into the Ottoman Empire in 1461 following the fall of Trebizond. Up until the middle of the 17th century the Ottomans focused on consolidating their power, granting Pontic Greeks a certain degree of autonomy. The following period that lasted until the end of the Russo-Turkish War (1768–1774) was marked by the implementation of the Chiflik system of land management and religious persecution of Christians, through forced conversions to Islam. The Russo-Turkish wars that followed led to unforeseen demographic changes, previously ethnically homogeneous due to its remote location and rough terrain, Pontus was to welcome thousands of Caucasus Muslims fleeing violence and persecution, notably the Circassian genocide. At the same time, Pontic Greeks fled to the Russian Empire to escape the repression and punitive measures enacted as a response to the Greek War of Independence. By 1914, the Greek population of the Russian Empire reached 650,000.

Despite the challenges they faced, Greek and Armenian merchants came to dominate the Black Sea trade by the middle of the 19th century. Numerous Greek schools were founded in south Russia, where liberal and nationalist ideas flourished and a new Intelligentsia arose. More and more Pontic Greeks embraced the nationalist Megali Idea ideology, while many Ottomans were influenced by emerging Turkish nationalism. Turkish nationalists regarded Greeks as an internal threat to the empire, yet believing that they were resistant to Turkification and should be ethnically cleansed. The solution of the "National Problem" that was put forward by the Young Turk Committee in 1911 and implemented in 1913, marking the beginning of the Greek genocide. The Pontic Greeks responded by forming insurgent groups, with weapons salvaged from the battlefields of the Caucasus Campaign of World War I or obtained from Russia. During World War I, the eastern Pontus was captured by Russian troops, who recognized the autonomous Provisional Government of Trebizond, formed by Metropolitan Chrysanthus.

The February Revolution that broke out in March 1917 halted the advance of the Russian army on the Caucasus Front. Soldiers and civilians formed soviets (revolutionary committees) which elected four commissars to rule over Kars, including one Greek. In May, a Caucasus Greek National Assembly convened in Tiflis, during which its delegates decided upon nationalizing Greek schools and issuing a Greek language newspaper. A separate agreement with national assemblies of other Caucasian nationalities resulted in the establishment of autonomous rule over areas populated by a Greek majority and the formation of an armed unit composed of ethnic Greeks to safeguard them. The outbreak of the October Revolution resulted in the dissolution of the Russian army on the Caucasus Front and its withdrawal from the front. The power vacuum was filled by the Ozakom, a four-man committee composed of representatives of Armenia, Georgia and Azerbaijan. While nominally allied with the Greek community, the authorities of Armenia and Georgia tried to forcibly conscript Greeks who held Ottoman or Greek citizenship.

== Operation ==
=== Formation ===
On 15 November 1917, the delegates of the Caucasus' Christian nations (Russians, Armenians, Georgians and Greeks) met in Tiflis and agreed to create a unified army of ethnically homogeneous units. The Greek Caucasus community numbered approximately 200,000 people and was therefore tasked with forming a division consisting of three regiments. The new units were to protect south Armenia, Georgia and Pontus from the Ottoman Army, the Bolsheviks and Muslim irregulars, while hierarchically belonging to the Army of the Provisional Government. The commander of the Russian Caucasus Army General Michael Przhevalsky welcomed the decision, pledging to recognize the rights of each nation willing to assist the Russian army after the end of the war. On 12 December, Przhevalsky met with the representatives of the Greek military committee consisting of Colonels Michael Ananiadis (Michael Ananiev), Demosthenes Pandazidis and Kilingarov, authorizing the formation of the Greek Caucasus Division.

The division was formed out of ethnic Greeks serving in the Caucasus, recruits from among the local population including former insurgents and the incorporation of Greeks serving on the Eastern Front was also planned. Its three regiments were stationed at Tiflis, Kars and Tsalka respectively. Each regiment had three battalions of four companies each. The division included an autonomous battalion stationed at Ardahan, a reserve regiment in Batumi, three artillery batteries, one cavalry battalion consisting of two companies and one engineering company. On 29 December, a congress of the Greek community appointed the Russian Army Colonel Ananiadis as the commander of the division with the former artillery Colonel Pandazidis serving as his deputy. Several units were commanded by Russian officers due to a shortage in experienced ethnic Greeks. Equipment was drawn from the 4th Russian Division which was in the middle of demobilization. The Greek Caucasus Division numbered approximately 3,000 soldiers, four artillery pieces, 16 machine guns and 155 horses.

The Armistice of Erzincan was signed at Erzincan on 18 December, suspending hostilities between Russia and the Ottomans. Fearing that Russia would drop out of the war, the Unified Allied Command issued a declaration supporting the formation of national volunteers units in the Russian Army, on 23 December. France and Britain also divided the Pontus into zones of responsibility, taking over north and south respectively. The Bolsheviks initially supported the retention of areas captured from the Ottomans during World War I and their autonomization, renouncing those claims after the Erzincan truce. Their calls for the immediate cessation of the war attracted many supporters, leading to mass desertions in the disorganized Russian Army.

=== Service ===
The Greek Caucasus Division, Russian anti-Bolsheviks and a small Georgian unit, were responsible for the protection of all areas between Erzincan and the edge of Russian-held Pontus. Seven hundred soldiers belonging to the division took part in the defense of Trebizond in conjunction with local insurgents and two companies of Russians and Georgians. The defense was hastily organized and the majority of the defenders were poorly trained, resulting in their defeat at the hands of Ottoman Çetes who massacred the Christian population in the city; attacks on Santa and Rodopolis were repulsed. A new recruitment drive was launched on 1 January 1918, since by that time the division existed only on paper, as many men had defected to the Bolsheviks or served in a tangled web of armed militias. Many members of the Greek community opposed its formation as they feared that it would provoke massacres akin to that in Trebizond. Most recruits originated from villages near army bases or enlisted in order to immediately defect to the Bolsheviks after stealing weapons and equipment. By early March, the division numbered at most 3,000 men, while suffering shortages in weaponry and experienced officers. It did not engage in any battles, limiting its operations to defensive skirmishes while protecting Greek villages and refugee convoys.

In February 1918, having encountered limited resistance, the Ottoman Army captured Trebizond and Sarıkamış. On 24 February, the Transcaucasian Democratic Federative Republic declared independence, initiating peace talks with the Ottomans on 8 March, to renegotiate the Treaty of Brest-Litovsk that was signed three days earlier. The treaty between the Central Powers and the Bolsheviks had granted Kars, Ardahan, Pontus and Batumi to the Ottomans. Negotiations broke down over a lack of unity inside the Transcaucasian government, caused by territorial disputes between Georgians and Armenians. The Greeks of Kars were also divided, civilian leaders advocated retreating deeper into the Caucasus and military officials insisted on fighting back against Muslim encroachment. Supplied with information from Turkish intelligence, Kurdish irregulars attacked Giola, Zavod and Ardahan against Greek and Georgian troops. The Kurds signed a truce with the defenders of Ardahan only to break it in a sudden attack, resulting in the disarmament of 200 Greek soldiers and the dissolution of the battalion defending the town. The regiment stationed in Kars prevented the massacre of the local Muslim population by an Armenian militia, then dissolved under the influence of local politicians. Greeks fled Pontus en masse, the remnants of the Greek Caucasus Division protecting them from Turkish and Armenian militia. On 25 March, the division clashed with the army of the Armenian National Congress after the latter attempted to seize their equipment at Karakilisa. On 14 April, the Ottomans occupied Batumi after overrunning a Greek company. On 25 April, the Ottomans seized Kars from the 2nd Greek Regiment and on 15 May, the 2nd Greek Regiment (down to 750 men) was defeated at Alexandropol.

== Aftermath ==
Realizing the futility of further resistance, the commander of the 2nd Regiment disbanded it and ordered his men to flee to Tiflis. Remnants of the Greek Caucasus Division continued their resistance at Samtret. The Armenians temporarily halted the Ottoman advance after the battles of Karakilisa and Sardarabad. On 26 May 1918, Georgia declared independence from the Transcaucasian Democratic Federative Republic. Two days later it signed the Treaty of Poti with Germany, securing its recognition in return for providing the German Caucasus expedition with free movement and bases in its territory. Under the terms of the agreement, all non-Georgian armed units, including the Greek Caucasus Division, were disbanded. A lack of unity in the Caucasus and Pontic Greek communities, in combination with the rising popularity of Bolshevism, led to a failure to organize an independent Greek state in the region.
