= Tokei Maru =

Japanese merchant steamship

- A Japanese-flagged ship (most likely the Tokei Maru) at Smyrna on 8 September 1922

History

Japan
- Name: Tokei Maru
- Owner: Dairen Towa Kisen
- Builder: William Dobson & Co., Walker-on-Tyne
- Yard number: 52
- Launched: 23 August 1892
- Completed: September 1892
- Identification: United Kingdom official number 101924
- Fate: Broken up in Japan, 1931

General characteristics
- Type: Cargo steamship
- Tonnage: 2,271 GRT; 1,399 NRT
- Length: 280 ft (85 m)
- Beam: 38.1 ft (11.6 m)
- Propulsion: Triple-expansion steam engine, Single screw
- Speed: 8.5 kn (15.7 km/h)
- Notes: Steel hull

Tokei Maru (Japanese: 東慶丸) was a Japanese merchant steamship known for saving Greek and Armenian refugees from Smyrna during the Burning of Smyrna in September 1922. It was built in Walker-on-Tyne, England, in 1892 as La Serena and later sailed under Australian ownership as Moonta before being acquired by Japanese owners in 1915. It was scrapped in 1931.

Greek newspapers reported that Tokei Maru transported refugees to Greece, while American diplomatic correspondence and newspapers described a Japanese captain throwing cargo overboard to make room for them. The ship's role in the rescue efforts has been commemorated in Greece and depicted in films and novels.

== Construction and service ==
The ship under its earlier name, Moonta.

William Dobson & Co. built the steel-hulled cargo ship at Walker-on-Tyne as yard number 52. It was launched on 23 August 1892 and completed the following month for Cuthbert Hutchinson of London. The North-Eastern Marine Engineering Company at Wallsend manufactured its triple-expansion engine.

In April 1899, La Serena stranded and was abandoned to its underwriters. The Adelaide Steamship Company purchased the wreck, repaired it and returned it to service as Moonta. W. Crosby & Co. acquired the ship in 1913, followed by Dairen Towa Kisen in 1915, which renamed it Tokei Maru.

== Refugee evacuation ==
=== Contemporary reports ===
The New York Times reported on 18 September 1922 that six steamers had been at Smyrna on the preceding Thursday: one American, one Japanese, two French and two Italian. The American and Japanese ships took refugees aboard without checking their papers, while the others accepted foreign subjects with passports.

On 18 September, American consul-general George Horton sent a dispatch from Athens to the United States secretary of state, reporting that a Japanese ship had taken refugees away and that the passengers praised its officers and crew. Horton also wrote that he had heard of cargo being thrown overboard to make room for them. The Indianapolis News later reproduced the dispatch. On 15 October the Atlanta Constitution published a letter by John S. Owens Jr. written to his parents, which described refugees disembarking at Piraeus and wrote how they said that a Japanese cargo vessel was dumping cargo and taking them in.

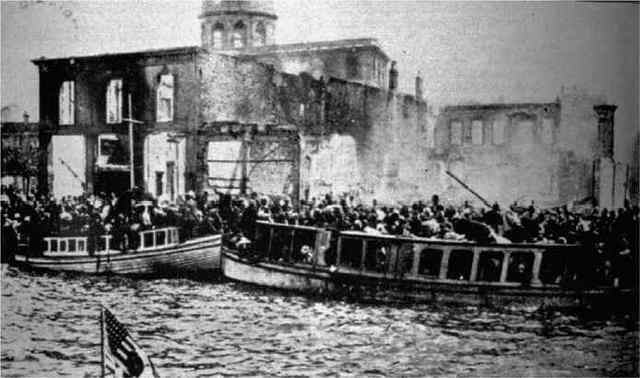
Refugees in boats attempting to reach Allied ships at Smyrna in 1922.

On 3 December 1922, the Boston Daily Globe published an account attributed to Anna Harlowe Birge, whose husband was a professor at Smyrna's International College. Birge described people crowding the waterfront and swimming in the harbour. She stated that a Japanese freighter threw its valuable cargo of silk, lace and china overboard and carried several hundred refugees to Piraeus. The English-language Japan Times and Mail had also praised a Japanese merchant ship and its treatment of refugees in an October report.

The Greek press identified the ship as Tokei Maru. According to the newspaper Empros, its captain defied Turkish officers who threatened the evacuation and declared that an attack on the refugees would be an insult to the Japanese flag:

It is worthwhile to refer to a philanthropic event as well as the brave conduct of a captain from a Japanese ship, the Tokei Maru. He was successful in helping 825 Greek refugees, despite the threat of the Turks. When the Japanese captain, pained by the terrible slaughter of the inhabitants and the petitions from Greek refugees, sent out all the lifeboats the ship had in order to take on board as many refugees as possible, officers of Kemalʼs military forces surrounded the boats and threatened to sink them. Then the Japanese captain immediately declared in person to the Kemalist officers that if they touched even a hair of the refugees, he would regard this act as an insult against the Japanese flag, a threat against the Japanese government, and he would request an immediate apology from the Kemalist government. Facing these warnings, the Turks consulted their superior officer and were obliged to let those refugees who had got on the boats leave freely.

Athinai called the captain "Mr Lou". An Empros editorial also called on Greeks to recognize Japan's assistance alongside that of the major powers. Advertisements from the period offered passenger and cargo transport aboard Tokei Maru from Piraeus to Alexandria via Chania and Heraklion.

=== Voyages and passenger numbers ===
The number of refugees carried by the ship remains disputed. Some sources report the rescue of 325 people, while others give a figure of 825 or even 1,600. Historian Nanako Murata Sawayanagi states that the number rescued cannot be established with certainty.

=== Survivor and family recollections ===
In his 1960 memoir The Story of a Young Life, Armenian survivor Byuzand Jambazian described reaching the waterfront and seeing bodies in the sea. He recalled that a Japanese ship was the first to take people aboard. Alis Torean's 1975 memoir My Childhood without Spring recounts a Japanese commander's protest against other Allied commanders' refusal to help.

In his memoirs, published in 1989, the musician Ruben Karakhanyan described meeting a Japanese captain in Tokyo in the 1930s. The captain was introduced to him as having rescued Christians at Smyrna and said that he had thrown cargo overboard to take them aboard.

In his 2006 book My Detroit, Dan Georgakas describes how his mother escaped from Asia Minor with her younger brother aboard a Japanese ship. She remembered a sailor helping her aboard and being given rice.

The introduction to Constantine Buller's Operation Dolby identifies Constantine and Marika Georgiades as refugees who travelled from Constantinople to Smyrna and boarded a Japanese ship. According to their family account, the captain ordered cargo thrown overboard and rescued people from the water before sailing to Thessaloniki.

Journalist Katerina Rovva also reported a recollection by Lydia Karagianis of Laconia, New Hampshire, preserved in publications held by Estia Neas Smyrnis. Relating her mother's experience as a young girl during the catastrophe, Karagianis described a Japanese ship intervening to save lives despite the restrictions imposed on other vessels. An account by Phyllis Sembos, published in The National Herald in 2018, described her grandmother and great-aunts being rescued by a Japanese ship.

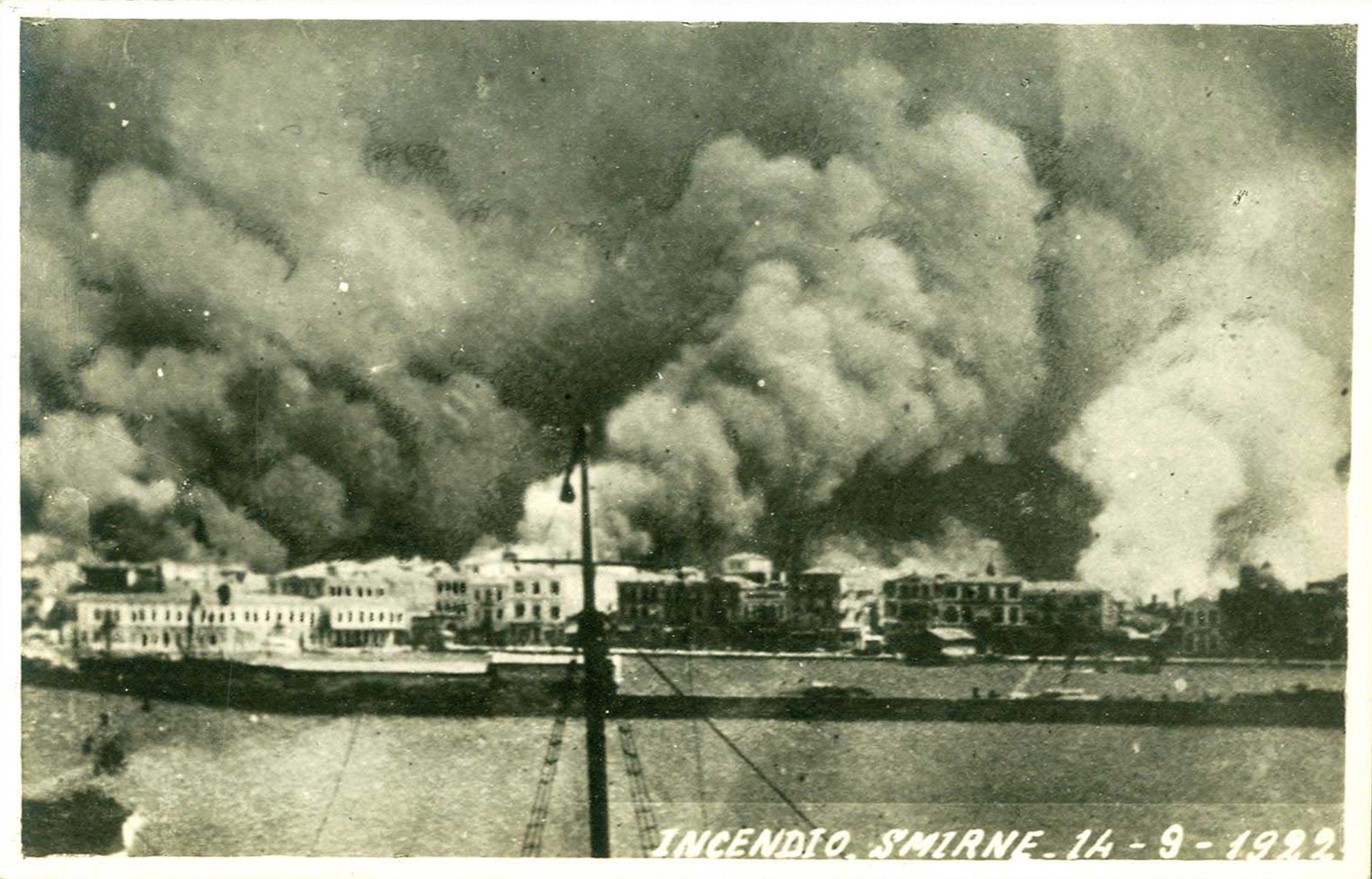
Smyrna burning on 14 September 1922, photographed from an Italian ship.

In a 2019 interview with Mainichi Shimbun, Yannis Itos of Thessaloniki recalled his grandfather's account of being rescued by a Japanese ship. His grandfather, a 33-year-old cook working in Smyrna, had fled to the harbour during the fire. He remembered the crew eating rice with bowls and chopsticks. According to Itos, when refugees without identification were initially refused permission to disembark at Piraeus, the captain appealed to the authorities to admit them.

Organist Berj Jamgochian recalled that his father, Nazareth, had been rescued by a Japanese ship. Vardanyan and Martoyan obtained a recording of his speech from the Miho Museum in Japan and reproduced his account. They associate the rescue with Tokei Maru.

A 2022 digital oral-history project recorded an interview with Telemachos Aplakis of Kavala about his grandmother, Eleni Aplaki. According to her grandson, she had fled Samsun and reached Smyrna, where she saw a Japanese ship taking Greeks and Armenians aboard while throwing merchandise overboard.

Greek genocide

Background
- Young Turk Revolution, Ottoman Greeks, Pontic Greeks, Ottoman Empire

The genocide
- Labour battalions, Death march, Pontic Greek genocide, Phocaea massacre, Evacuation of Ayvalik, İzmit massacres, 1914 Greek deportations, Samsun deportations, Amasya trials, Burning of Smyrna

Resistance
- Greek resistance during the Greek genocide, Seventh Battle of Dazli, Anton Pasha, Efkleidis Kourtidis

Foreign aid and relief
- Relief Committee for Greeks of Asia Minor, American Committee for Relief in the Near East, Asa Jennings, Esther Pohl Lovejoy, Pope Benedict XV, Pope Pius XI, Tokei Maru

Responsible parties
- Young Turks or Committee of Union and Progress; Three Pashas: Talat, Enver, Djemal; Bahaeddin Şakir, Teskilati Mahsusa or Special Organization, Nureddin Pasha, Topal Osman, Mustafa Kemal Atatürk

See also
- Greco-Turkish War (1919–1922), Greeks in Turkey, Population Exchange, Greek refugees, Armenian genocide, Assyrian genocide, Diyarbekir genocide, Istanbul trials of 1919–1920, Malta Tribunals

== Captain ==
The captain's identity is also disputed. Greek newspapers called him Lou, while later accounts gave his name as T. Norito. Murata, however, found the name Sazō Hibi (日比左三) in a Japanese maritime publication for September 1922. The same publication listed Norito in connection with other ships instead.

Religiously, Sazō Hibi was a Buddhist. Chiyo Hibi, Sazō's wife, however, wrote that his mother was an Orthodox Christian, something very rare for Japan. Murata presumes that, because of this, "when he saw the tragic sight of Orthodox Christians in Smyrna, he did not hesitate for a moment to help them".

== Commemoration ==
In 2016, descendants of refugees presented Japanese ambassador to Greece Masuo Nishibayashi with a plaque thanking Japanese sailors for their reported assistance. In February 2021, the Armenian Genocide Museum-Institute and the Armenia-Nippon Scientific-Cultural Union held an event about Tokei Maru.

On 23 September 2022, the Japanese embassy in Greece, the Benaki Museum and the Centre for Asia Minor Studies marked the centenary in Athens with a lecture by Murata and a screening of Zachos Samoladas's animated film about the ship. Events in Kavala that month included talks by Murata and Stavridis, a film screening and the planting of a cherry tree.

== Cultural depictions ==
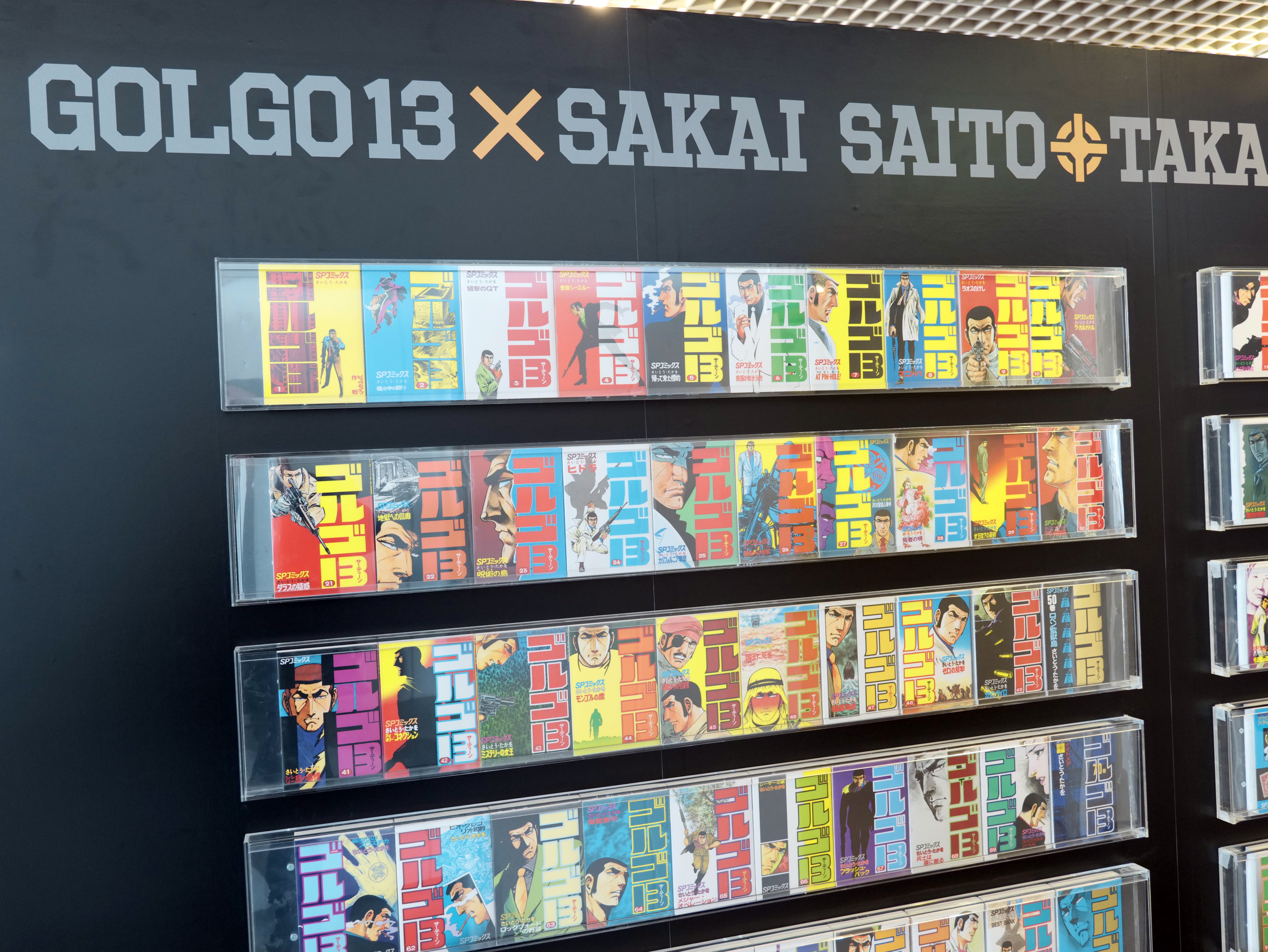
In Volume 228 of the Japanese manga Golgo 13, there is a reference to the Burning of Smyrna, recounting the story in which the Japanese protected Smyrna's Christian civilians from the Turks.

- Jeffrey Eugenides refers to Japanese assistance at Smyrna in his 2002 Pulitzer Prize–winning novel Middlesex. Desdemona, one of its characters, remains grateful to the Japanese even during World War II.
- Zachos Samoladas directed the Greek animated short film Tokei Maru in 2018. The film depicts the captain throwing cargo overboard to take refugees aboard. Samoladas and Eleni Andreadou also wrote a novel titled Tokei Maru, published in 2021.
- In the 2021 film Smyrna, My Beloved, the ship appears rescuing refugees. According to the Japanese embassy, Ambassador Yasunori Nakayama asked for it to be included.
- Petros Pourliakas's 2022 historical novel Almyro metaxi (Salty Silk) is about the ship and the destruction of Smyrna. Pourliakas discussed his research and the novel's themes in a 2025 interview in the arts and literature section of Genocide Studies and Prevention.
- In Japan, NHK broadcast a report on the ship on Ohayō Nippon on 1 October 2022, followed by an English-language NHK World report on 28 October.

== Sources ==
- Buller, Constantine (2015). Operation Dolby. Memoirs Books. ISBN 9781909304970.
- Murata, Nanako (2018). "Did a Japanese Ship Rescue Hundreds of Greek Refugees from Smyrna a Century Ago?". We Are Tomodachi. Government of Japan.
- Murata, Nanako (2020). "記憶と歴史──1922年のギリシア系正教徒難民のスミルナ脱出と日本船をめぐって──" [Memory or History?: Narratives on the Rescue Operation of Greek Refugees by a Japanese Ship at Smyrna in 1922]. Bulletin of Toyo University, Department of History, Faculty of Literature (in Japanese). 45: 153–200.
- Murata, Nanako (2023). "Reconsidering Narratives and Facts of the Rescue Activities by a Japanese Ship in Smyrna in 1922". Bulletin of Toyo University, Department of History, Faculty of Literature. 48: 1–32.
- Murata-Sawayanagi, Nanako (2017). "The Memory in a Crisis: A Japanese Ship Helping Out Greek Refugees on the Quay of Smyrna in 1922". Mediterranean World. 23: 135–146.
- Pourliakas, Petros (2025). "Arts & Literature: The Destruction of Smyrna in 1922: A Conversation with Petros Pourliakas, Author of Salty Silk". Genocide Studies and Prevention. 19 (1): 59–62. doi:10.5038/1911-9933.19.1.2045.
- Rovva, Katerina (2016). "Οι Ιάπωνες που έσωσαν ζωές στη Μικρασία" [The Japanese who saved lives in Asia Minor]. Ethnos (in Greek) – via Notia.gr.
- Stavridis, Stavros T. (2022). "The Japanese at Smyrna: September 1922" (PDF). American Journal of Contemporary Hellenic Issues. 13: 1–7.
- Vardanyan, Anna A.; Martoyan, Tehmine R. (2020). "Ճապոնական նավի հետագծով. Զմյուռնիայի հայերի և հույների փրկուղին" [Tracking the Japanese Ship: The Rescue Route of Smyrna's Armenians and Greeks] (PDF). Journal of Genocide Studies (in Armenian). 8 (2): 76–95. doi:10.51442/jgs.0003.
- Vorylla, Georgia (1 October 2026). "Σμύρνη 1922: Έσωσε πρόσφυγες το ιαπωνικό πλοίο «Tokei Maru»; Τι λέει η Ιαπωνίδα ιστορικός που ερευνά την υπόθεση" [Smyrna 1922: Did the Japanese ship Tokei Maru save refugees? What the Japanese historian researching the case says]. Pontos News (in Greek).
