= Seventh Battle of Dazli =

1922 battle of the Greek resistance during the Greek genocide

- Part of Greek resistance during the Greek genocide
Date	16 May 1922
Location	Dazli, Erbaa, Pontus
Result	Pontic Greek victory

Belligerents
Pontic Greek guerrillas	Turkish National Movement

Commanders and leaders
Georgios Megalomystakas; Kotza Anastas	Cevit Pasha

Strength
c. 200 armed men, with c. 200 unarmed auxiliaries	c. 10,000 soldiers and irregulars

Casualties and losses
Unknown	Heavy
- More than 200 Greek women and children killed

The Seventh Battle of Dazli (Greek: Έβδομη μάχη εις το Δαζλή) was an engagement between Pontic Greek guerrillas and forces of the Turkish National Movement at the village of Dazli, in the Erbaa area of Pontus, during the final phase of the Greek resistance during the Greek genocide.

== Background ==
Greek genocide

Background
- Young Turk Revolution, Ottoman Greeks, Pontic Greeks, Ottoman Empire

The genocide
- Labour battalions, Death march, Pontic Greek genocide, Phocaea massacre, Evacuation of Ayvalik, İzmit massacres, 1914 Greek deportations, Tekâlif-i Milliye, Samsun deportations, Amasya trials, Burning of Smyrna

Resistance and rescue
- Greek resistance during the Greek genocide, Seventh Battle of Dazli, Anton Pasha, Kotza Anastas, Efkleidis Kourtidis, Habil Bey

Foreign aid and relief
- Relief Committee for Greeks of Asia Minor, American Committee for Relief in the Near East, Asa Jennings, Esther Pohl Lovejoy, Pope Benedict XV, Pope Pius XI, Tokei Maru

Responsible parties
- Young Turks or Committee of Union and Progress; Three Pashas: Talat, Enver, Djemal; Bahaeddin Şakir, Teskilati Mahsusa or Special Organization, Nureddin Pasha, Topal Osman, Mustafa Kemal Atatürk

See also
- Greco-Turkish War (1919–1922), Greeks in Turkey, Population Exchange, Greek refugees, Armenian genocide, Assyrian genocide, Diyarbekir genocide, Istanbul trials of 1919–1920, Malta Tribunals

The area around the Dazli creek was a mountainous area approximately 28 km southwest of Erbaa. Turkish accounts describe numerous caves in the area which were used by the Pontic Greek guerrillas as shelters and defensive positions. Turkish forces repeatedly attempted to regain control of the region, but failed each time. Six previous battles between the guerrillas and Turkish forces had taken place. The seventh battle of May 1922 was the largest and most significant of the series. Turkish sources record repeated clashes in the area during 1921–1922 and describe the surrounding mountains and caves as favorable to guerrilla warfare.

Turkish forces deployed against the guerrillas included formations of the Central Army's 10th Division. The 48th Regiment, 3rd Battalion, was moved toward Dazli, while the 66th Regiment, 2nd Battalion, was subsequently deployed in the area for operations against the guerrillas.

Turkish sources describe an earlier engagement beginning on 18 January 1922 and continuing for approximately four days. According to the Turkish account, two soldiers were killed on 19 January and a further seven on 21 January, while an officer and nineteen other soldiers were wounded. Pontic Greek sources also describe a larger series of engagements around Dazli in late 1921 and early 1922. One account identifies 22 February 1922 as the date of a major clash involving forces under Cemal Cevit, while other accounts describe the fighting as continuing from late 1921 into early 1922. Turkish forces repeatedly attacked the group, including an earlier battle when the Greek guerrillas were surrounded and fought their way out with assistance from guerrillas led by Kotza Anastas, whose men attacked the Turkish forces from the rear.

It is also documented that Circassians supplied the guerrillas in Dazli with weapons, ammunition, clothing and food.

== Battle ==
=== Turkish attack ===
On 16 May 1922, Cevit Pasha arrived at Dazli with a regiment and began a regular siege of the village. Irregular Turkish forces from Erbaa, Amasya, Tokat and Niksar also participated. Meanwhile, Circassian informants assisting the Pontic Greek guerrillas preemptively warned them and estimated the combined Turkish force at approximately 10,000 soldiers and irregulars. The Pontic Greek position was commanded by Georgios Megalomystakas, who requested assistance from the prominent guerrilla commander Anastasios Papadopoulos, known as Kotza Anastas.

The Turkish forces constructed multiple lines of trenches before beginning their main assault. The fortified positions was similar to the trench systems of the Western Front during World War I. The attack was supported by rifle, machine-gun and artillery fire. Meanwhile, the Pontic guerrillas moved the women and children accompanying them into caves and other protected positions in the surrounding mountains. As the Turkish troops advanced, the defenders came under increasing pressure.

=== Reinforcements ===
Megalomystakas requested reinforcements from Kotza Anastas. Approximately 80 armed men initially went to the small village of Tseprahil, near Dazli, in order to await Anastas, but learned that he had been wounded. Nevertheless, Anastas managed to send Theophilos and Michael Kioutsoglou with approximately 40 armed men to reinforce the defenders. Subsequently, a force of approximately 200 armed men and 200 unarmed auxiliaries was assembled and took part in the relief effort. The relief force marched during the night toward Dazli and took up positions in the surrounding mountains.

=== Greek counterattack ===
By evening, the Turkish troops had approached sufficiently close to the Pontic Greek guerrilla positions that their officers expected the defenders to surrender the following morning. Instead, the guerrillas organized a night counterattack. The Pontic Greek fighters were divided into three groups of approximately twenty men. The two flanking groups were commanded by Vasileios Papadopoulos and Savvas Iordanidis, while the main body remained under Megalomystakas.

After nightfall, the three groups attacked the Turkish positions from the front and flanks. The Turkish gendarmerie and irregular forces were the first to retreat, while the regular troops continued to resist for approximately two hours before withdrawing and dispersing. The Pontic fighters reached the Turkish trenches and engaged some of the soldiers in close combat. Some Turkish soldiers abandoned their weapons and ammunition, leaving them to the guerrillas.

== Aftermath ==
Although the battle ended in a Greek victory, the Turks, before retreating, captured hundreds of Greek women and children accompanying the guerrillas and subsequently massacred them.

== Turkish records ==
Turkish military records document the fighting at Dazli during May 1922. A contemporary Grand National Assembly of Turkey record likewise refers to a clash with Greek guerrillas at "Dazlı Deresi" and records the wounding of a certain "Mülâzım İskender Efendi" together with approximately forty soldiers.

== Sources ==
- Alexandrou, Charalambos (2022). "Αντάρτικο των Ελλήνων του Πόντου: Δημιουργία, εξέλιξη και χαρακτηριστικά" (PDF). Η Σημερινή (in Greek).
- Anadolu Agency (2019). "Kurtuluş Savaşı'na katılan 13 askerin mirasçısına İstiklal Madalyası verilecek" (in Turkish).
- Aslanidis, Savvas K. (1950). "Η έβδομη μάχη εις το Δαζλή". Ποντιακή Εστία (12).
- Chrysostomidou, E. (2010). Ποντιακή Δημοκρατία: «Το όραμα της ίδρυσης και η πορεία στο πλαίσιο των διεθνών εξελίξεων» (PDF) (Doctoral dissertation). Democritus University of Thrace.
- Grand National Assembly of Turkey. TBMM Zabıt Ceridesi (in Turkish). Vol. 20.
- Menç, Hüseyin. Millî Mücadele Yıllarında Amasya (in Turkish).
- Taşova Belediyesi (2004). Taşova Belediyesi 60. Yılında Taşova Kitapçığı (in Turkish).
- Tsaousidis, Pavlos (25 May 2021). "Το αντάρτικο του Πόντου και η γενοκτονία των Ποντίων" (in Greek).
- Yalçın, Kemal (1999). Emanet Çeyiz: Mübadele İnsanları (in Turkish). Istanbul: Belge Uluslararası Yayıncılık. ISBN 975-6817-25-9.
