= Evacuation of Ayvalik =

Ethnic cleansing of Greeks from Ayvalik, modern-day Turkey

Greek genocide

Background
- Young Turk Revolution, Ottoman Greeks, Pontic Greeks, Ottoman Empire

The genocide
- Labour battalions, Death march, Pontic Greek genocide, Phocaea massacre, Evacuation of Ayvalik, İzmit massacres, 1914 Greek deportations, Samsun deportations, Amasya trials, Burning of Smyrna

Resistance and rescue
- Greek resistance during the Greek genocide, Seventh Battle of Dazli, Anton Pasha, Efkleidis Kourtidis, Habil Bey

Foreign aid and relief
- Relief Committee for Greeks of Asia Minor, American Committee for Relief in the Near East, Asa Jennings, Esther Pohl Lovejoy, Pope Benedict XV, Pope Pius XI, Tokei Maru

Responsible parties
- Young Turks or Committee of Union and Progress; Three Pashas: Talat, Enver, Djemal; Bahaeddin Şakir, Teskilati Mahsusa or Special Organization, Nureddin Pasha, Topal Osman, Mustafa Kemal Atatürk

See also
- Greco-Turkish War (1919–1922), Greeks in Turkey, Population Exchange, Greek refugees, Armenian genocide, Assyrian genocide, Diyarbekir genocide, Istanbul trials of 1919–1920, Malta Tribunals

Evacuation of Ayvalik
- Location: Ayvalik
- Date: 1917
- Target: Greek population of Ayvalik
- Attack type: Deportation, genocidal massacre
- Victims: 12,000-23,000 deported
- Perpetrators: Ottoman Empire, Young Turks, Otto Liman von Sanders
- Motive: Anti-Greek sentiment, Turkification, Turkish nationalism

The evacuation of Ayvalik took place in May 1917 as part of the genocide policies of the Ottoman government. The population of the predominantly Greek-inhabited town of Ayvalik, Ottoman Empire (in modern Turkey) on the east coast of the Aegean Sea was forcibly deported to the hinterland of Anatolia by the Ottoman authorities. The deportation was organized by Imperial German Army General and chief military adviser to the Ottoman Empire, Liman von Sanders, and included death marches, looting, torture and massacre against the local civilian population.

Persecution against the population of the predominantly Greek-inhabited settlement of Aivalik on the east coast of the Aegean had begun in 1910. In 1917, during World War I although nearby Greece was still a neutral state, the ethnic Greek population of the Ottoman state was viewed as an internal threat and genocide policies continued to be implemented.

== Background ==
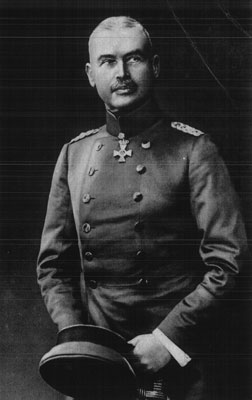
German general and military advisor to the Ottoman Empire, Otto Liman von Sanders

The population of the predominantly ethnic Greek town of Aivalik was subject to state-sponsored persecution already from 1910. Anti-Greek policies begun with boycott of Greek owned businesses; anti-Greek signs were placed in several public locations in the town and yelling men were mobilized on the streets of Ayvalik in order to terrorize the non-Muslim population. The local population was harassed in the countryside by irregular groups and cultivation of their fields was prohibited.

Persecution was intensified in 1914, when a total of about 154,000 ethnic Greeks living in the western part of the Ottoman Empire lost their homes. With the outbreak of World War I and the participation of the Ottoman Empire on the side of the Central Powers persecution against the local Greek element took a more violent and systematic form and affected a more extensive area, including also Pontus in northern Anatolia. These policies included confiscations of property, as well as the creation of forced labor battalions for all Greek males.

Meanwhile, Greek refugees from the regions of Bergama and Edremit poured into nearby Ayvalik, at that time a town of approximately 30,000 inhabitants and with a Greek majority of 98.5%. The Ottoman authorities sought to further weaken the Greek element of Ayvalik with the confiscation of Greek properties and attacks by Muslim irregulars in the outskirts. The first wave of deportation of some Ayvalik residents occurred in 1914 and a second one followed in July 1915.

== Evacuation ==
According to a report by German general and military advisor to the Ottoman Empire Otto Liman von Sanders, the immediate expulsion of the entire Greek of Ayvalik was a military necessity; otherwise he couldn't guarantee the security of the Ottoman front. As soon he visited Ayvalik, von Sanders wondered out loud to the Ottoman officials:

Couldn't we just throw these infidels into the sea?

Though there was some evidence that specific individuals were spying for the Triple Entente it was decided that the entire community should be deported. The evacuation order was issued at March 14, 1917. According to the Ottoman military commanders, the order was given by Sanders. The entire Greek population of Ayvalik between the ages of 12 and 80 was exiled to inner Anatolia.

The operation was organized by Liman von Sanders. Though Sanders claimed that he tried to keep the operation under control, numerous atrocities were committed against the local civilian population from early on. Moreover, the deportations were accompanied by looting and destruction of Greek churches, schools, hospitals and dwellings in the region as well as in nearby Bergama and Dikili. According to contemporary reports by the Greek press, gangs of Muslim boys were also mobilized by amputating the hands of Greek children as a punishment after the latter threw stones at the Ottoman soldiers.

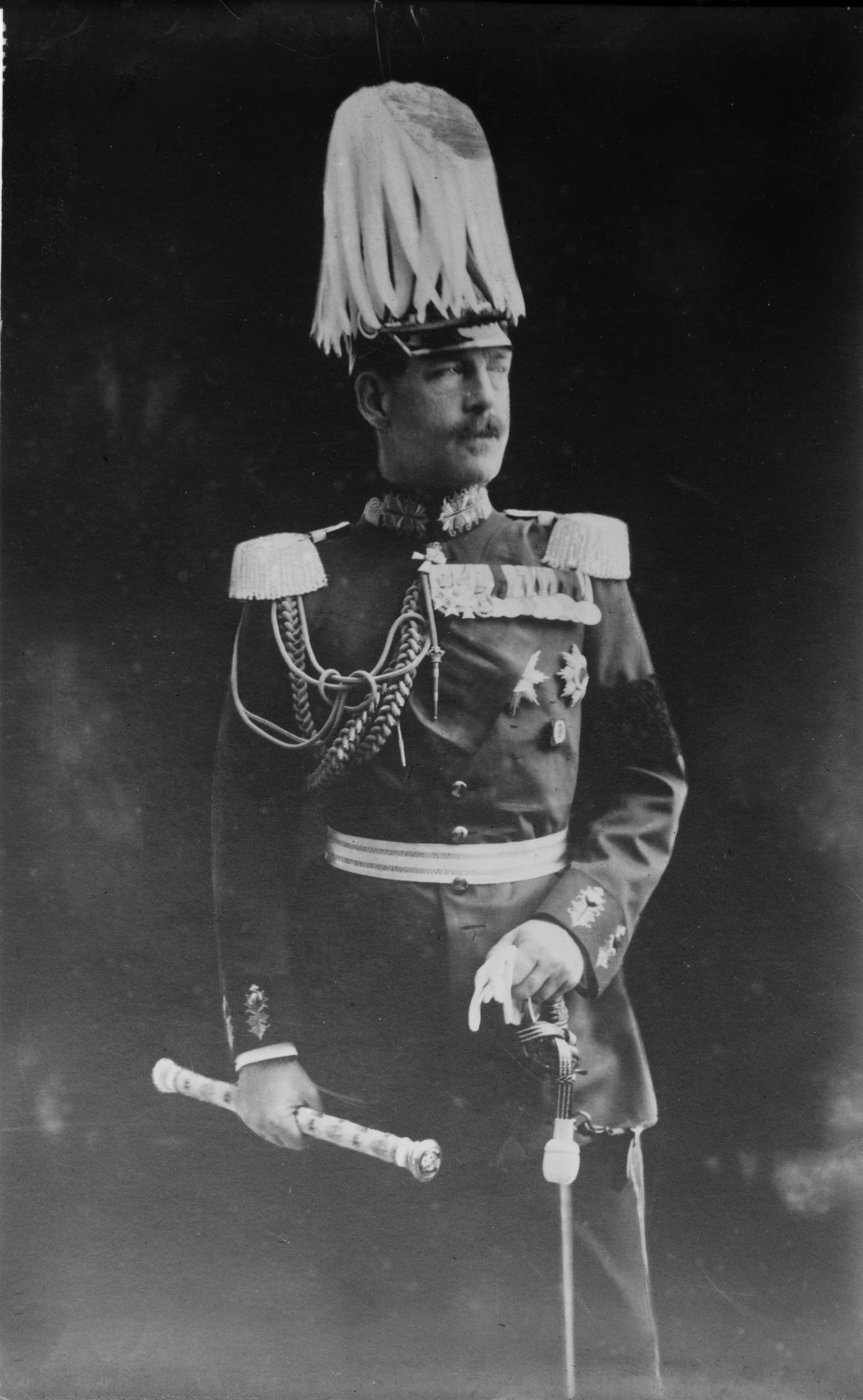
The future of pro-German King Constantine of Greece became precarious in Greece due to the German involvement in the Ayvalik incident.

Inhabitants were forcibly taken out of their homes, beaten and moved to the local military depots. The women and children were forced to march on foot for c. 24 hour to the nearest railway station. During the following week they were relocated to Bursa where they were subject to attacks and lynching by the Muslim mob and irregular groups (bashibazouks). Moreover, hundreds of civilians were taken on death marches to inland parts of Anatolia. The sick were shot by Ottoman soldiers.

== Aftermath ==
Estimates of the number of the deportees vary: according to Ottoman-Greek representatives they were c. 23,000, while German accounts estimated that c. 12,000-20,000 were forcibly moved out of Ayvalik. The deportation of such a significant number became a major topic in the European diplomatic agenda and the Western press. The German Empire was afraid that such an operation would trigger the entry of Greece (then a neutral country) into World War I on the Allied side. Moreover, the German involvement in the anti-Greek Ayvalik operation had a negative impact on pro-German king Constantine of Greece whose future in Greece became precarious.

During 1919–1922, when the region came temporarily under Greek control as part of the terms of the Treaty of Sèvres, only half of Ayvalik's initial population returned. In September 1922 Ayvalik was captured by troops of the Turkish national movement and its Greek population was forcibly evacuated. A total of 3,000 citizens were transported to inland Anatolia as part of the labour battalions and only 23 of them managed to survive.

== See also ==
- Outline and timeline of the Greek genocide

== Sources ==
- Akçam, Taner (2004). From Empire to Republic: Turkish Nationalism and the Armenian Genocide. Zed Books. ISBN 9781842775271.
- Boubougiatzi, Evaggelia (2009). "Οι διωγμοί των Ελλήνων της Ιωνίας 1914-1922 [The Persecution of Greeks in Ionia 1914-1922]" (in Greek). University of Western Macedonia.
- Doğan, Çetinkaya, Y.; Letteren, Faculteit der. "Muslim merchants and working-class in action : nationalism, social mobilization and boycott movement in the Ottoman Empire 1908-1914". openaccess.leidenuniv.nl.
