= Amasya trials =

Special ad hoc trials organized by the Turkish National Movement

- Part of the Pontic Greek genocide and Greco-Turkish War (1919–1922)
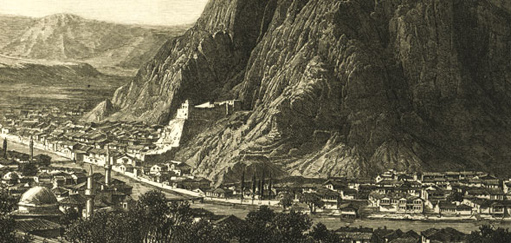
- The town of Amasya, in the interior of the Black Sea coast, where the trials and the executions took place.
- Location: Amasya, Pontus, Ottoman Empire
- Date: August 20 to September 21, 1921
- Target: Prominent members of the Pontiac Greek community
- Attack type: Genocidal massacre, eliticide
- Motive: Turkification of Pontus, Turkish nationalism, racism, Anti-Greek sentiment

The 1921 Amasya trials (Turkish: Amasya İstiklâl Mahkemesi; Greek: Δικαστήρια της Αμάσειας) were special ad hoc trials, organized by the Turkish National Movement, with the purpose to kill en masse the Greek representatives of Pontus region under a legal pretext. They occurred in Amasya, modern Turkey, during the final stage of the Pontic Greek genocide. The total number of the executed individuals is estimated to be ca. 400-450, among them 155 prominent Pontic Greeks.

== Background ==
Greek genocide

Background
- Young Turk Revolution, Ottoman Greeks, Pontic Greeks, Ottoman Empire

The genocide
- Labour battalions, Death march, Pontic Greek genocide, Phocaea massacre, Evacuation of Ayvalik, İzmit massacres, 1914 Greek deportations, Samsun deportations, Amasya trials, Burning of Smyrna

Resistance and rescue
- Greek resistance during the Greek genocide, Seventh Battle of Dazli, Anton Pasha, Efkleidis Kourtidis, Habil Bey

Foreign aid and relief
- Relief Committee for Greeks of Asia Minor, American Committee for Relief in the Near East, Asa Jennings, Esther Pohl Lovejoy, Pope Benedict XV, Pope Pius XI, Tokei Maru

Responsible parties
- Young Turks or Committee of Union and Progress; Three Pashas: Talat, Enver, Djemal; Bahaeddin Şakir, Teskilati Mahsusa or Special Organization, Nureddin Pasha, Topal Osman, Mustafa Kemal Atatürk

See also
- Greco-Turkish War (1919–1922), Greeks in Turkey, Population Exchange, Greek refugees, Armenian genocide, Assyrian genocide, Diyarbekir genocide, Istanbul trials of 1919–1920, Malta Tribunals

The Ottoman genocide policy against the Pontic Greek populations was initiated after the outbreak of World War I (1914), mostly through deportation and forced death marches. This policy of extermination was intensified, after accusations that the Pontic Greek communities supported the Russian army. As a result, the Ottoman authorities deported thousands of local Greeks to the interior of Anatolia. The Ottoman genocide policy took a more violent form in 1917, when Greece entered World War I. A large number of the deported populations died from disease, exhaustion and epidemics during death marches. Those who managed to survive the marches were either raped, subject to forced islamization or murdered. Meanwhile, Turkish irregular band (cete) leaders, like Topal Osman, notorious from his role in the Armenian genocide, were dispatched against the Greeks of Samsun province in 1916.

The same policy continued after the outbreak of the Greco-Turkish War (1919–1922), where groups of irregular Turkish bands acted with the support of the Turkish nationalists of Mustafa Kemal and committed massacres in the Pontus region in 1920–21.

== Trials ==
The Turkish nationalists' aim was to conduct summary trials and executions of the Pontic Greek elite. Thus they would be able to exterminate the main representatives of the Greek community of the Black Sea coastal area under a legal pretext, as part of the still active genocide policy. These "Independence tribunals" were conducted in Amasya, a town in the interior of Anatolia, far from any foreign consulate, in order to avoid the presence of western representatives, since this was considered an "inner case".

From December 1920 the Turkish nationalists started to arrest en masse various Greek representatives from all parts of the Pontus region and imprisoned them in Amasya. The trials began in the end of August 1921, however, no concrete evidence was ever found to link the accused with anti-Turkish activity. There were only abstract claims that some of them supported the Russian army during World War I. In the same fashion, the Turkish nationalists felt offended when they realised after investigation that the jerseys of the local Greek soccer team Pontus Metzifon displayed the colors of the Greek flag (blue and white).

The trials were presided by Emin Bey Gevecioğlu, solicitor from nearby Samsun. After summary proceedings, where insults and berating comments were shouted at the accused persons by the judge, the verdict for the vast majority of them was death, with the pretext that they organized the independence of Pontus. The sentences were handed down immediately.

From August 20 to September 21, 1921, 177 Greeks of the Pontus region were hanged as a result of these proceedings. The exact total number of those executed by the Amasya trials is unknown, while estimations vary from 400 to 450 persons. On 25 September 1921, a local Turkish newspaper, published a list of 155 prominent Pontic Greeks who were hanged in the central square of Amasya.

Those sentenced to death were politicians, businessmen, journalists and religious figures of the local Greek community. Among them was the local assistant bishop of Amasya, Euthemios Zelon, who died in prison from typhus. Nevertheless, the court sentenced him to death posthumously and his dead body was hanged in the central square of the town together with the others.

== Aftermath and reactions ==
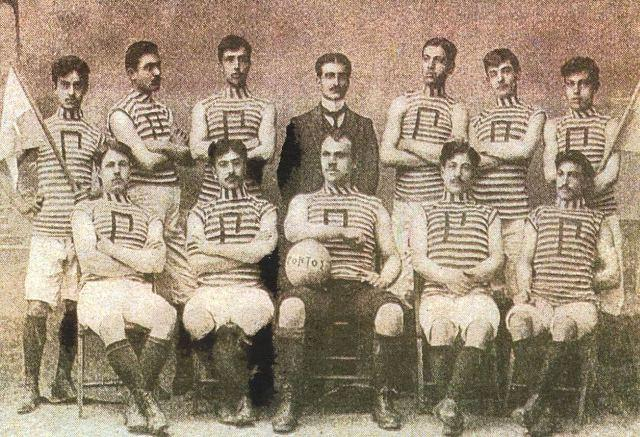
A number of the soccer players of Pontus Merzifounta (pictured) were sentenced and hanged, without concrete evidence of anti-Turkish activity: Turkish nationalists felt offended because the team's jersey displayed the colours of the Greek flag (blue-white).

The trials and the executions in Amasya by the Turkish movement of Mustafa Kemal succeeded in the extermination of the Pontic Greek elite under a legal pretext, while the total death toll of the Pontic Greek community, as a result of the Ottoman and Turkish policies, from 1915 to 1923, is estimated from 353,000 to 360,000.

Reactions for the atrocities committed occurred both inside and outside Turkey. The hanging of Matthaios Kofidis in Amasya, former member of the Ottoman parliament, who opposed any form of armed resistance movement against the Turkish authorities, caused anger even among the Muslim population of Trebizond, who refused to collaborate with the Turkish nationalists, thus saving the lives of several local Greeks.

Protests were reported in Greece and the United Kingdom. Moreover, countries which had been at that time in alliance with the Turkish nationalists, like France and Italy, also condemned the atrocities. The issue of the extermination of the Pontic Greek population was also raised in the United States Congress on December 22, 1921, by Senator William H. King.

== Sentenced to death ==
- Matthaios Kofidis, businessman and politician, former member of the Ottoman parliament.
- Nikos Kapetanidis, journalist and newspaper publisher.
- Pavlos Papadopoulos, director of the Ottoman bank of Samsun.
- Iordanis Totomanidis, director of the tobacco monopoly in Bafra.
- Dimosthenes Dimitoglou, banker.
- Teachers and students of the Mertsivan Anatolia High School, some of them were players of the school's soccer team "Pontus Merzifon". Three of the teachers killed were Ch. Evstathiades, G. Lamprianos, and D. Theocharides.
- Euthemios Zelon, assistant metropolitan bishop of Amasya.
- Platon Aivazidis, protosyncellus of Amasya.
- Georgios Th. Kakoulidis, merchant.

=== In absentia ===
- Chrysanthos, metropolitan bishop of Trebizond, latter archbishop of Athens.
- Karavaggelis Germanos, metropolitan bishop of Amasya.
- Laurentios, metropolitan bishop of Chaldia.

== See also ==
- Deportation of Armenian intellectuals on 24 April 1915
- Outline of the Greek genocide

== Sources ==
- Clark, Bruce (2006). Twice a Stranger: The Mass Expulsion that Forged Modern Greece and Turkey. Cambridge (Massachusetts): Harvard University Press. ISBN 9780674023680.
- Gerlach, Christian (2010-10-14). Extremely Violent Societies: Mass Violence in the Twentieth-Century World. Cambridge University Press. ISBN 9781139493512.
- Hofmann, Tessa (2007). Verfolgung, Vertreibung und Vernichtung der Christen im Osmanischen Reich : 1912-1922 (in German) (2. Aufl. ed.). Münster: Lit. ISBN 9783825878238.
- Koutsoupias, FotiosFotios (2000). Η Εκκλησιαστική και Εκπαιδευτική Κίνηση στην Εκκλησιαστική Επαρχία Χαλδίας του Πόντου: 19ος-20ος αιώνας (Thesis) (in Greek). University of Thessaloniki. doi:10.12681/eadd/13619. hdl:10442/hedi/13619.
- Suny, Ronald Grigor; Goçek, Fatma Müge; Naimark, Norman M. (2011). A Question of Genocide: Armenians and Turks at the end of the Ottoman Empire. Oxford: Oxford University Press. ISBN 9780199781041.
- Tsirkinidis, Harry (1999). At Last we Uprooted them: The Genocide of Greeks of Pontos, Thrace and Asia Minor through French Archives. Thessaloniki: Kyriakidis Brothers. ISBN 9789603434788.
- Lieberman, Benjamin (2013). The Holocaust and Genocides in Europe. New York: Continuum Publishing Corporation. ISBN 9781441194787.
- Vergeti, Maria (1993). Ethno-Regional Identity: The Case of Pontian Greeks (Thesis) (in Greek). Panteion University. doi:10.12681/eadd/2548. hdl:10442/hedi/2548.
