= Samsun deportations =

Death marches orchestrated by the Turkish National Movement

Greek genocide

Background
- Young Turk Revolution, Ottoman Greeks, Pontic Greeks, Ottoman Empire

The genocide
- Labour battalions, Death march, Pontic Greek genocide, Phocaea massacre, Evacuation of Ayvalik, İzmit massacres, 1914 Greek deportations, Samsun deportations, Amasya trials, Burning of Smyrna

Resistance and rescue
- Greek resistance during the Greek genocide, Seventh Battle of Dazli, Anton Pasha, Efkleidis Kourtidis, Habil Bey

Foreign aid and relief
- Relief Committee for Greeks of Asia Minor, American Committee for Relief in the Near East, Asa Jennings, Esther Pohl Lovejoy, Pope Benedict XV, Pope Pius XI, Tokei Maru

Responsible parties
- Young Turks or Committee of Union and Progress; Three Pashas: Talat, Enver, Djemal; Bahaeddin Şakir, Teskilati Mahsusa or Special Organization, Nureddin Pasha, Topal Osman, Mustafa Kemal Atatürk

See also
- Greco-Turkish War (1919–1922), Greeks in Turkey, Population Exchange, Greek refugees, Armenian genocide, Assyrian genocide, Diyarbekir genocide, Istanbul trials of 1919–1920, Malta Tribunals

The Samsun deportations were a series of death marches orchestrated by the Turkish National Movement as part of its extermination of the Greek community of Samsun, a city in northern Turkey (then still formally the Ottoman Empire), and its environs. It was accompanied by looting, the burning of settlements, rape, and massacres. As a result, the Greek population of the city and those who had previously found refuge there—a total of c. 24,500 men, women and children—were forcibly deported from the city to the interior of Anatolia in 1921–1922. The atrocities were reported by both American Near East Relief missionaries and naval officers on destroyers that visited the region.

The deportations were part of the Turkish National Movement's genocidal policies against the Pontic Greek community of the Black Sea region of Turkey which from 1914 to 1923 reached a final death toll of c. 353,000. It was also part of the last stage of the Greek genocide, which was launched after the landing of Mustafa Kemal in Samsun, in May 1919.

== Background ==
During 1915–1917 the deportations in the Pontus had involved slaughter, rape, brutality, and robbery that reached far beyond any justification, military or otherwise. Only a small number of the victims might have been involved in any anti-Turkish resistance activity. Moreover, notorious bands of cetes (organized brigands), especially those led by Topal Osman had been engaged in continuous shooting, plunder and rape of defenseless Greek villagers in the Pontus region. As a result of this campaign of genocide the Christian population of Samsun, the most important port on the south coast of the Black Sea, was dramatically affected: the Armenian community that originally numbered 5,000 members was reduced to only 1,000 inhabitants, while the 15,000 ethnic Greeks were reduced to 10,000 at the end of World War I.

On May 19, 1919, Mustafa Kemal (later Atatürk) landed in Samsun, far away from the war zone of the Greco-Turkish War in western Anatolia. The arrival of the former together with members of the former Young Turks movement, many of whom were wanted for crimes committed during World War I, marked the final phase of the Greek genocide and the extermination campaign of the local Greek communities continued the following years.

== Campaign of extermination ==
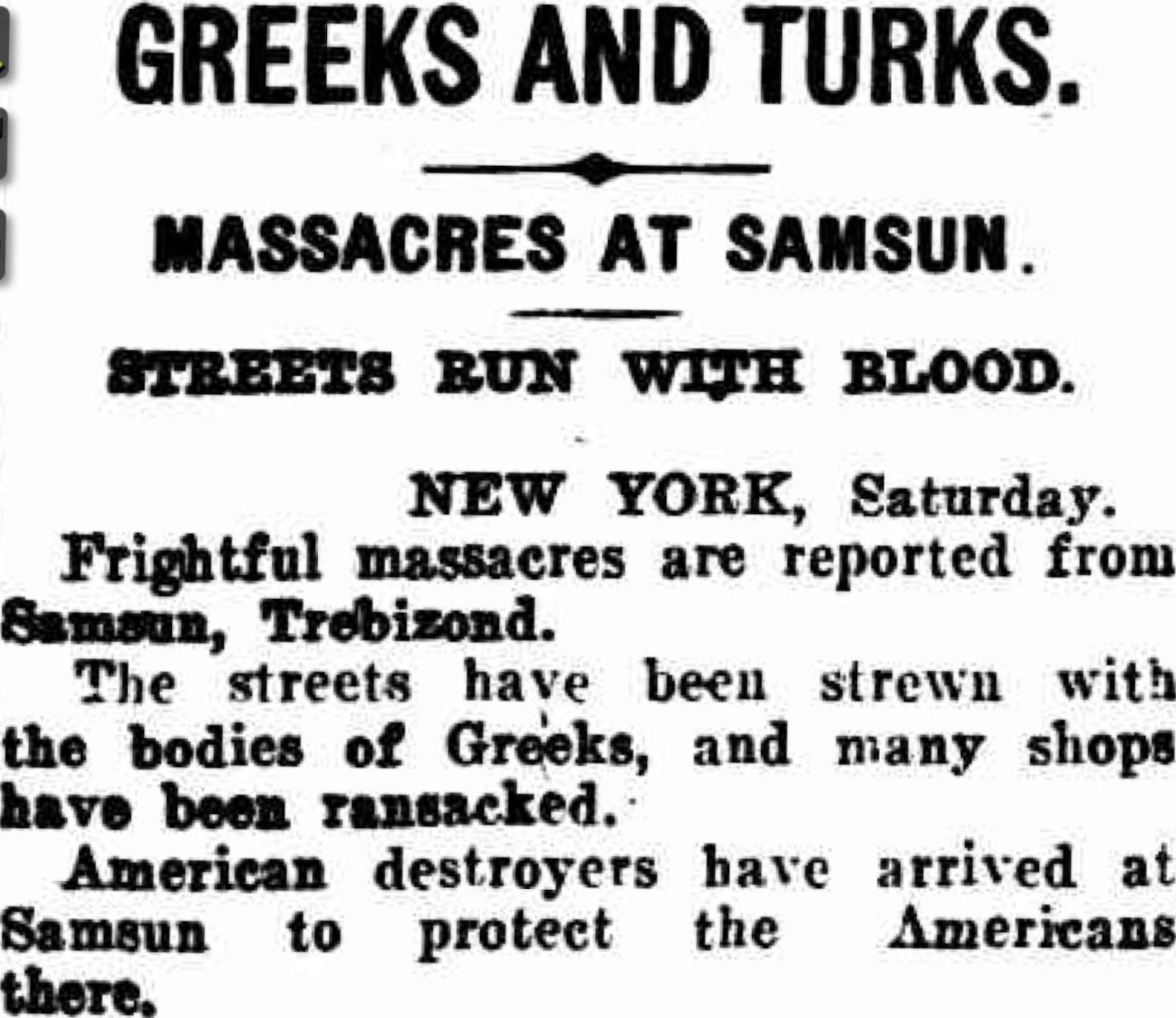
Massacres at Samsun: Streets run with blood, The Tweed Daily, 6 Jun 1921

During late spring of 1921, the activity of armed bands led by Topal Osman included looting, burning of Greek settlements around Samsun and massacre of the civilian Greek population. The rest of the population was deported to the interior of Anatolia. Although not allowed out of Samsun, American relief workers observed the nearby village of Kadikeuy being systematically looted. Its residents as well as those from other villages fled to the city of Samsun to find refuge. Due to his activity, Topal Osman was portrayed as a "national hero" by the Turkish press in Ankara and Constantinople. Meanwhile, the commander of USS Fox which was stationed off Samsun, reported that c. 100 surrounding Greek villages were destroyed, their inhabitants killed and the priests were crucified. As a result, the United States High Commissioner in Istanbul, admiral Mark Lambert Bristol, immediately filled a protest against the Turkish officials of Samsun.

In the last week of May 1921, bandits of Topal Osman swarmed into Samsun itself. On June 16, the Turkish nationalist government of Ankara authorized the deportation of all Greek males between ages 16 and 50 who remained in Samsun. The deportations were carried out by Turkish General Nureddin Pasha. Meanwhile, the commander of USS Overton stationed off Samsun reported to admiral Bristol that the deportations would be carried out quickly and that a large number of the deportees would die as a natural consequence.

American Near East Relief workers in Samsun determined that all the deportees "were being sent to their deaths" while also observing the impunity with which Turkish irregular bands were committing murders on the streets of Samsun, as well as investigated the Christian residences. As a result, the Near East Relief orphanage at Samsun was flooded with Greek children from the region. A commission of US navy officers visited the Samsun Mutasarrif. The latter claimed that the deportation order was already in effect and admitted that many of the Greek men who had been deported earlier had been killed. Admiral Bristol protested the deportations to the Turkish nationalist government based in Ankara.

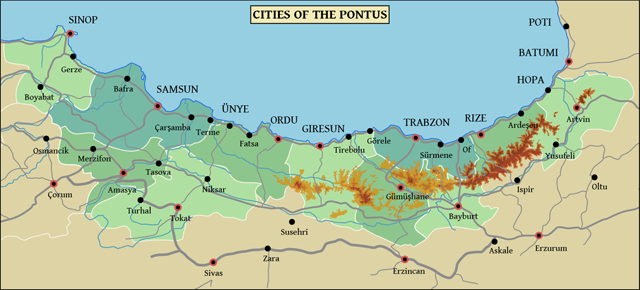
Map of the Pontus region

Most deportees were marched via Amasya and Sivas to Harput, and from there to Diyarbakir, Bitlis, and Van. As a result of the deportations that were ordered in June, nearly 21,000 people were forcefully deported from Samsun. In early September 1921, 1,500 women and children from nearby Greek villages who had recently found temporary refuge in Samsun were deported. A similar deportation was undertaken against c. 6,000 women and children from the adjacent Bafra district.

American relief worker Edit Wood, on his way from Samsun to Harput, noted:

Bodies lay along the roadside and in the fields everywhere. There was no hope for the Greeks from Malatia to Samsun, and the most fortunate were those who perished at the start.

In mid-November 1921, 700 women and children who had earlier fled to the hills returned to Samsun for fear of cold due to the approaching winter. The Turkish authorities did not hesitate to deport them altogether. Some reactions by the head of the Near East Relief to stop at least part of the deportation were ignored by the local Turkish governor. In April 1922, the commander of the USS Fox, William Leahy, reported that an additional 1,300 Greeks were sent out from Samsun, mostly women and children, but also a few old men.

== Witnesses ==
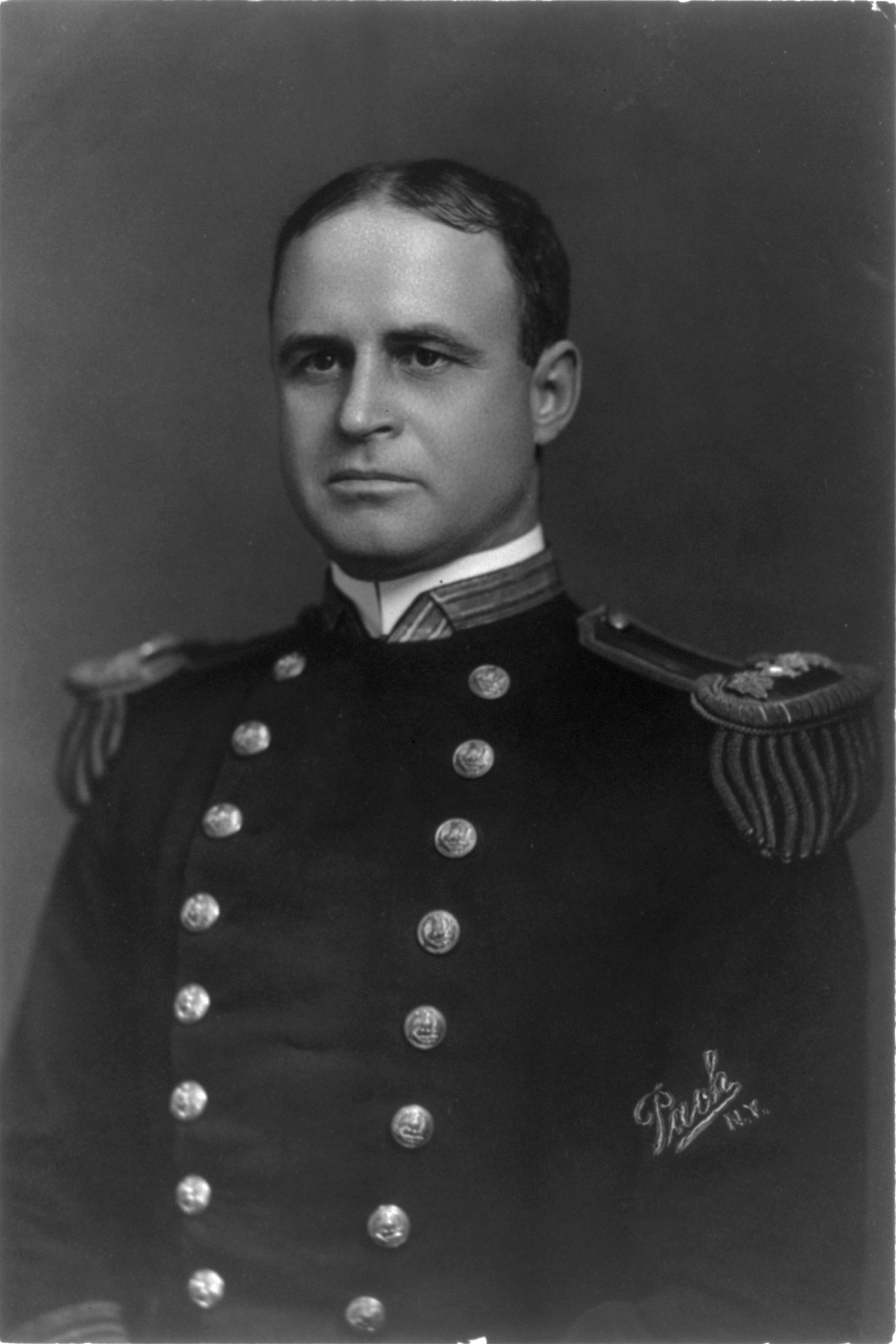
U.S navy admiral Mark Lambert Bristol protested to the local Ottoman authorities in Samsun against the deportations

Atrocities against the local Greek element were reported as early as March 1921, both by American Near East Relief missionaries and naval officers on destroyers that visited the Pontus region and especially the Black Sea ports of Trebizond and Samsun. On one occasion Admiral Bristol sent the cruiser St. Louis to Samsun as a show of concern for these atrocities. In another instance, an American naval officer witnessed Greek women in Samsun purchasing poison, being determined not to leave themselves "at the mercy of the Turks". From September 1921 on, ominous reports of Turkish atrocities from American destroyers stationed at Samsun became more frequent. Protests by Admiral Bristol to the Turkish authorities of Mustafa Kemal against the deportations were not enough to save the local Greek element.

== Aftermath ==
By September 1922, when the Greco-Turkish War ended with the destruction of Smyrna, there were virtually no Greeks left in Samsun. The Greek cemetery of the city had been plowed up and planted with tobacco.

== See also ==
- Turkish war crimes
- Outline and timeline of the Greek genocide

== Sources ==
- Pericles, Alexiadis Thomas (2008). Η Αμισός του Πόντου [Amisos of Pontus] (in Greek). University of Thessaloniki.
- Prott, Volker (2016). The Politics of Self-Determination: Remaking Territories and National Identities in Europe, 1917-1923. Oxford University Press. ISBN 9780191083549.
- Shenk, Robert (2017). America's Black Sea Fleet: The U.S. Navy Amidst War and Revolution, 1919 1923. Naval Institute Press. ISBN 9781612513027.
- Shirinian, George N. (2017). Genocide in the Ottoman Empire: Armenians, Assyrians, and Greeks, 1913-1923. Berghahn Books. ISBN 9781785334337.
