= Smyrna, My Beloved =

Film directed by Grigoris Karantinakis

- Directed by: Grigoris Karantinakis
- Written by: Mimi Denisi; Martin Sirman
- Based on: Smyrna my Beloved by Mimi Denisi
- Starring: Mimi Denisi; Burak Hakkı; Rupert Graves; Susan Hampshire
- Cinematography: Simos Sarketzis
- Music by: Andreas Katsigiannis
- Distributed by: Tanweer Productions
- Release date: December 23, 2021
- Running time: 141 minutes
- Country: Greece
- Language: Greek

Smyrna, My Beloved (Greek: Σμύρνη μου αγαπημένη) is a 2021 Greek historical epic film directed by Grigoris Karantinakis about the burning of Smyrna (today's Izmir, Turkey) by the Turkish army in September 1922. The film stars Mimi Denisi, Burak Hakkı, Rupert Graves and Susan Hampshire.

== Summary ==
The story follows the wealthy Greek Baltatzis family in the multicultural city of Smyrna during the Greco-Turkish War 1919-1922 and after the Turkish army entered the city in 1922, and shows the suffering and exodus of the ethnic Greeks of the city.

== Screenings ==
The film premiered at Megaron-Athens Concert Hall.

The film screened at Redstone Theatre through Museum of the Moving Image in May 2022.

== Reception ==
=== Reviews ===
A review in The National Herald said, "The film is also a lesson about showing compassion to others in their times of need."

Athens Insider referred to the film as "a poignant tale of loss and belonging".

The film was reviewed by Tom McSorley of the CBC.

At least one Turkish publication, Hürriyet, criticized the film, calling it "propaganda".

=== Awards ===
Smyrna, My Beloved won The Audience Award for Feature Film at the Los Angeles Greek Film Festival.
