= Burning of Smyrna =

1922 fire during the Greco-Turkish War

- Part of the Greco-Turkish War (1919–1922) and the Greek and Armenian genocides
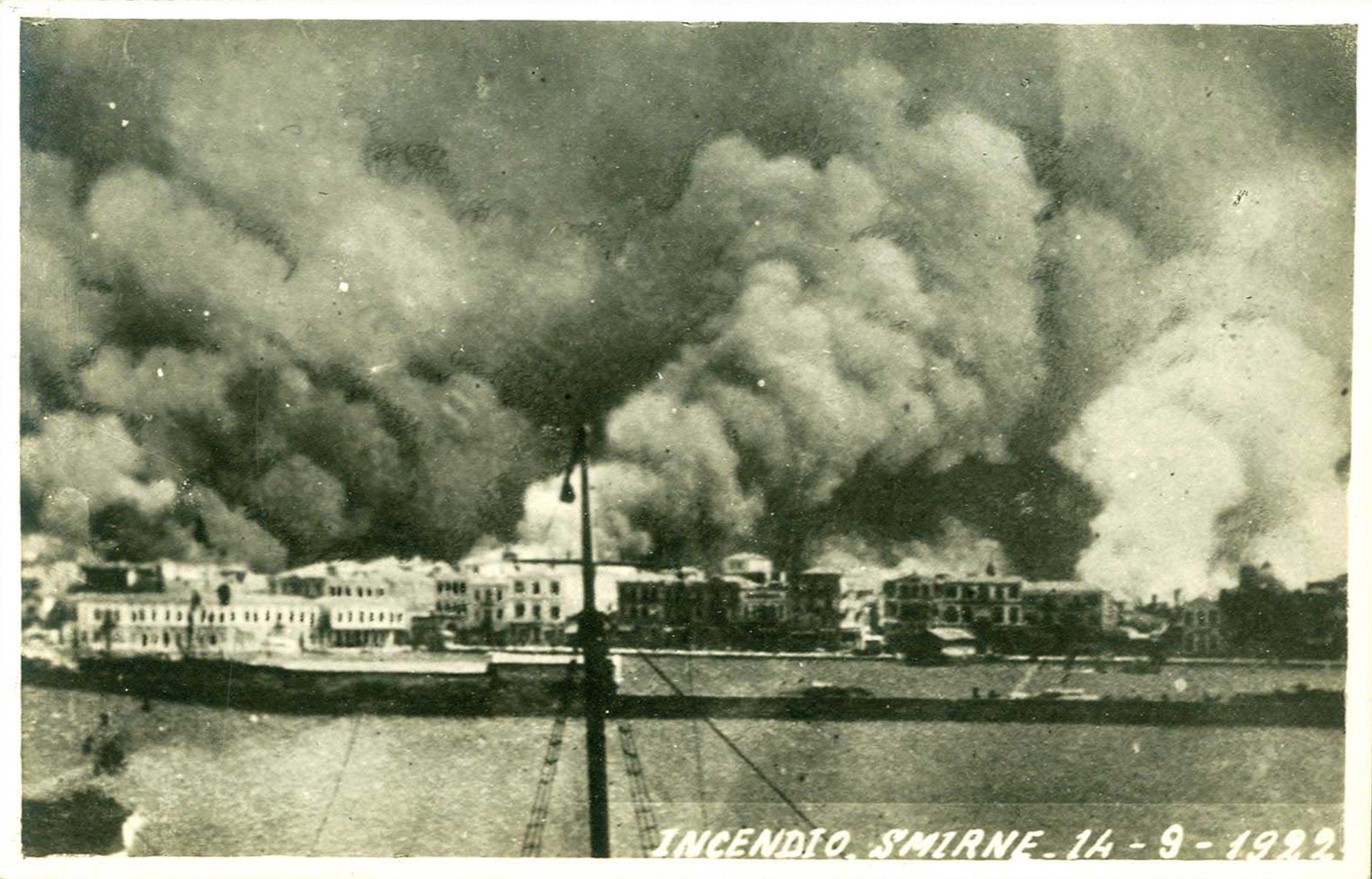
- Plumes of smoke rising from Smyrna on 14 September 1922
- Date: 13–22 September 1922
- Location: Smyrna, Greek Zone of Smyrna (today İzmir, Turkey)
- Also known as: Great Fire of Smyrna; Smyrna Catastrophe
- Type: Arson, mass murder, rape, religious persecution, ethnic cleansing, genocide
- Motive: Turkish nationalism, anti-Christian sentiment, anti-Greek sentiment, anti-Armenian sentiment
- Perpetrator: Turkish National Movement
- Outcome: Destruction of the Greek, Armenian and Western European quarters
- Deaths: See § Casualties and refugees

Greek genocide

Background
- Young Turk Revolution, Ottoman Greeks, Pontic Greeks, Ottoman Empire

The genocide
- Labour battalions, Death march, Pontic Greek genocide, Phocaea massacre, Evacuation of Ayvalik, İzmit massacres, 1914 Greek deportations, Tekâlif-i Milliye, Samsun deportations, Amasya trials, Burning of Smyrna

Resistance and rescue
- Greek resistance during the Greek genocide, Seventh Battle of Dazli, Anton Pasha, Kotza Anastas, Efkleidis Kourtidis, Habil Bey

Foreign aid and relief
- Relief Committee for Greeks of Asia Minor, American Committee for Relief in the Near East, Asa Jennings, Esther Pohl Lovejoy, Pope Benedict XV, Pope Pius XI, Tokei Maru

Responsible parties
- Young Turks or Committee of Union and Progress; Three Pashas: Talat, Enver, Djemal; Bahaeddin Şakir, Teskilati Mahsusa or Special Organization, Nureddin Pasha, Topal Osman, Mustafa Kemal Atatürk

See also
- Greco-Turkish War (1919–1922), Greeks in Turkey, Population Exchange, Greek refugees, Armenian genocide, Assyrian genocide, Diyarbekir genocide, Istanbul trials of 1919–1920, Malta Tribunals

The burning of Smyrna (Note: Greek: Καταστροφή της Σμύρνης, romanized: Katastrofí tis Smírnis 'Smyrna catastrophe'; Turkish: 1922 İzmir Yangını '1922 İzmir Fire'; Armenian: Զմիւռնիոյ Մեծ Հրդեհ, Zmyuṙnio Mets Hrdeh 'The Great Fire of Smyrna') destroyed much of the port city of Smyrna (modern İzmir, Turkey) in September 1922. The fire started on 13 September 1922 and was largely extinguished on 22 September. It began four days after the Turkish military captured the city on 9 September, effectively ending the Greco-Turkish War, more than three years after the Greek landing of troops at Smyrna. Greek and Armenian deaths resulting from the fire and the ensuing massacres were in the tens or hundreds of thousands.

The fire completely destroyed the Greek and Armenian quarters of the city; the Muslim and Jewish quarters escaped damage. The Western European quarter, home to Italian, French, British, and American residents, was also destroyed.

Approximately 80,000 to 400,000 Greek and Armenian refugees crammed the waterfront to escape from the fire. They were forced to remain there under harsh conditions for nearly two weeks. Turkish troops and irregulars had started committing massacres and atrocities against the Greek and Armenian population in the city before the outbreak of the fire. Many women were raped. Tens of thousands of Greek and Armenian men were subsequently deported into "labour battalions" in the interior of Anatolia, where most of them died in harsh conditions.

Despite differing accounts and eyewitness reports concerning the responsibility for the fire, there is an international historical consensus that Turkish nationalists were responsible for igniting and spreading the fire, as well as for the systematic destruction and atrocities committed during it. Although a few, Turkish or pro-Turkish, sources hold that the Greeks or Armenians started the fire, most contemporary sources and modern scholars attribute it to Turkish soldiers setting fire to Greek and Armenian homes, churches and businesses to eradicate the last traces of Christian presence in Anatolia. Testimonies from Western eyewitnesses were printed in many Western newspapers.

The event is considered one of the most catastrophic urban fires in history, as well as an act of genocide and a war crime; it is considered the "symbolic end" of the Greek genocide, and still remains a source of tension between Greece and Turkey. Winston Churchill called it an "infernal orgy" and stated that: "For a deliberately planned and methodically executed atrocity, Smyrna must...find few parallels in the history of human crime".

== Background ==
The ratio of the Christian population to the Muslim population remains a matter of dispute, but the city was both a multicultural and cosmopolitan center until September 1922. Different sources claim either Greeks or Turks as constituting the majority in the city. According to Katherine Elizabeth Flemming, in 1919–1922 the Greeks in Smyrna numbered 150,000, forming just under half of the population, outnumbering the Turks by a ratio of two to one. Alongside Turks and Greeks, there were sizeable Armenian, Jewish, and Levantine communities in the city. According to Trudy Ring, before World War I the Greeks alone numbered 130,000 out of a population of 250,000, excluding Armenians and other Christians.

According to the Ottoman census of 1906/7, there were 341,436 Muslims, 193,280 Greek Orthodox Christians, 12,273 Armenian Gregorian Christians, 24,633 Jews, and 55,952 foreigners, for a combined total of to 630,124 people in İzmir sanjak (13 Kazas including the central Kaza); the updated figures for 1914 gave 100,356 Muslims, 73,676 Greek Orthodox Christians, 10,061 Armenian Gregorians, 813 Armenian Catholics, 24,069 Jews for the central kaza of İzmir. Ottoman censuses generally underestimated Christians and overestimated non-Christians.

According to the U.S. Ambassador to the Ottoman Empire at the time, Henry Morgenthau, more than half of Smyrna's population was Greek. The American consul general in Smyrna at the time, George Horton, wrote that before the fire there were 400,000 people living in the city of Smyrna, of whom 165,000 were Turks, 150,000 were Greeks, 25,000 were Jews, 25,000 were Armenians, and 20,000 were foreigners—10,000 Italians, 3,000 French, 2,000 British, and 300 Americans. Most of the Greeks and Armenians were Christians.

Moreover, according to various scholars, prior to the war, the city was a center of more Greeks than the ones who lived in Athens, the capital of Greece. The Ottomans of that era referred to the city as Infidel Smyrna (Gavur İzmir) due to the numerous Greeks and the large non-Muslim population.

== Events ==
=== Entry of the Turkish Army ===
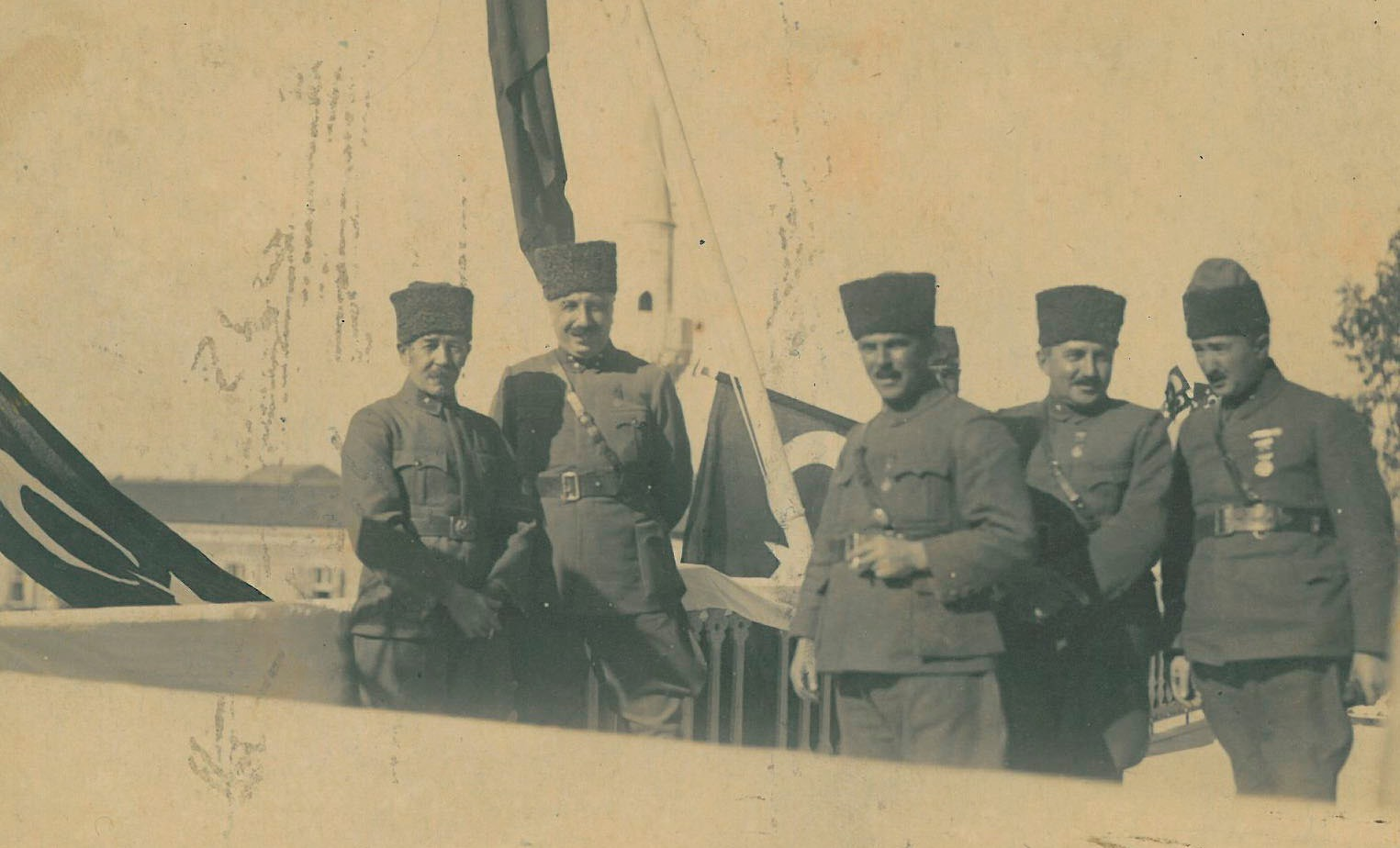
Chief Artillery Inspector "Sarı" Emin Bey, 5th Cavalry Corps Commander Major General Fahrettin (Altay), 1st Army Corps Commander Brigadier General İzzettin (Çalışlar), 8th Infantry Division Commander Brigadier General Kâzım (Sevüktekin), 1st Army Chief of Staff Brigadier General Mehmet Emin (Koral) Pashas in the balcony of the Konak building before the Battle of Paradise (Kızılçullu)- 10th of September 1922

Greek troops evacuated Smyrna on the evening of Friday 8 September. The first elements of Mustafa Kemal's forces, a Turkish cavalry squadron, made its way into the city from the northern tip of the quay the following morning, establishing their headquarters at the main government building called Konak. The Hellenic Army was in disarray and could not evacuate the city in an orderly manner, and fighting continued to the next day. According to the General of the 5th Cavalry Sidearmy Fahrettin Altay, on 10 September, Turkish forces belonging to the 2nd and the 3rd Cavalry regiments captured around 3,000 Greek soldiers, 50 Greek Officers, including a Brigadier Commander in the south of the city center who were retreating from Aydın. Lieutenant Ali Rıza Akıncı, the first Turkish officer to hoist the Turkish flag in the Turkish capture of Smyrna on 9 September, mentions in his memoirs that his unit of 13 cavalrymen was ambushed by a volley of fire from 30–40 rifles from the Tuzakoğlu factory after being saluted and congratulated by a French Marine platoon in the Halkapınar bridge. This volley fire killed 3 cavalrymen instantly and fatally wounded another. They were relieved by Captain Şerafettin and his two units which encircled the factory. Moreover, Captain Şerafettin, alongside Lieutenant Ali Rıza Akıncı were wounded by a grenade thrown by a Greek soldier in front of the Pasaport building. The lieutenant was wounded lightly from his nose and his leg, and his horse on its belly. The grenade thrower was also mentioned by George Horton as "some fool threw a bomb", and that the commander of this unit "received bloody cuts about the head". A monument was later erected on the spot these cavalrymen had fallen. Military command was first assumed by Mürsel Pasha, and then Nureddin Pasha, General of the Turkish First Army.

At the outset, the Turkish occupation of the city was orderly. Though the Armenian and Greek inhabitants viewed their entry with trepidation, they reasoned that the presence of the Allied fleet would discourage any violence against the Christian community. On the morning of 9 September, twenty-one Allied warships lay at anchor in Smyrna's harbor, including the British battleships HMS Iron Duke and King George V, along with their escort of cruisers and destroyers under the command of Admiral Osmond Brock; the American destroyers USS Litchfield, Simpson, and Lawrence (later joined by the Edsall); three French cruisers and two destroyers under the command of Admiral Dumesnil; and an Italian cruiser and destroyer. The British warships were intended to evacuate Smyrna's British nationals to Malta or Cyprus. As a precaution, sailors and marines from the Allied fleet were landed ashore to guard their respective diplomatic compounds and institutions with strict orders of maintaining neutrality in the event that violence would break out between the Turks and the Christians.

On 9 September, order and discipline began to break down among the Turkish troops, who began systematically targeting the Armenian population, pillaging their shops, looting their homes, separating the men from the women and carrying away and sexually assaulting the latter. The Greek Orthodox Metropolitan bishop, Chrysostomos, was tortured and hacked to death by a Turkish mob in full view of French soldiers, who were prevented from intervening by their commanding officer. When told of the news, Admiral Dumesnil plainly remarked, "He got what was coming to him." Refuge was sought wherever possible, including Paradise, where the American quarter was located, and the European quarters. Some were able to take shelter at the American Collegiate Institute and other institutions, despite strenuous efforts to turn away those seeking help by the Americans and Europeans, who were anxious not to antagonize or harm their relations with the leaders of the Turkish National movement. An officer of the Dutch steamer Siantar which was at the city's port during that period reported an incident that he has heard, according to him after the Turkish troops had entered the city a large hotel which had Greek guests was set on fire, the Turks had placed a machine gun at the opposite of the hotel's entrance and opened fire when people were trying to exit the burning building. In addition, he said that the crew were not allowed to go offshore after dusk because thugs were roaming the city's streets and it was dangerous.

It is estimated that between 9 and 13 September, before the fire broke out, around 2,000 Greeks and Armenians had already died as a result of Turkish atrocities.

=== Burning ===
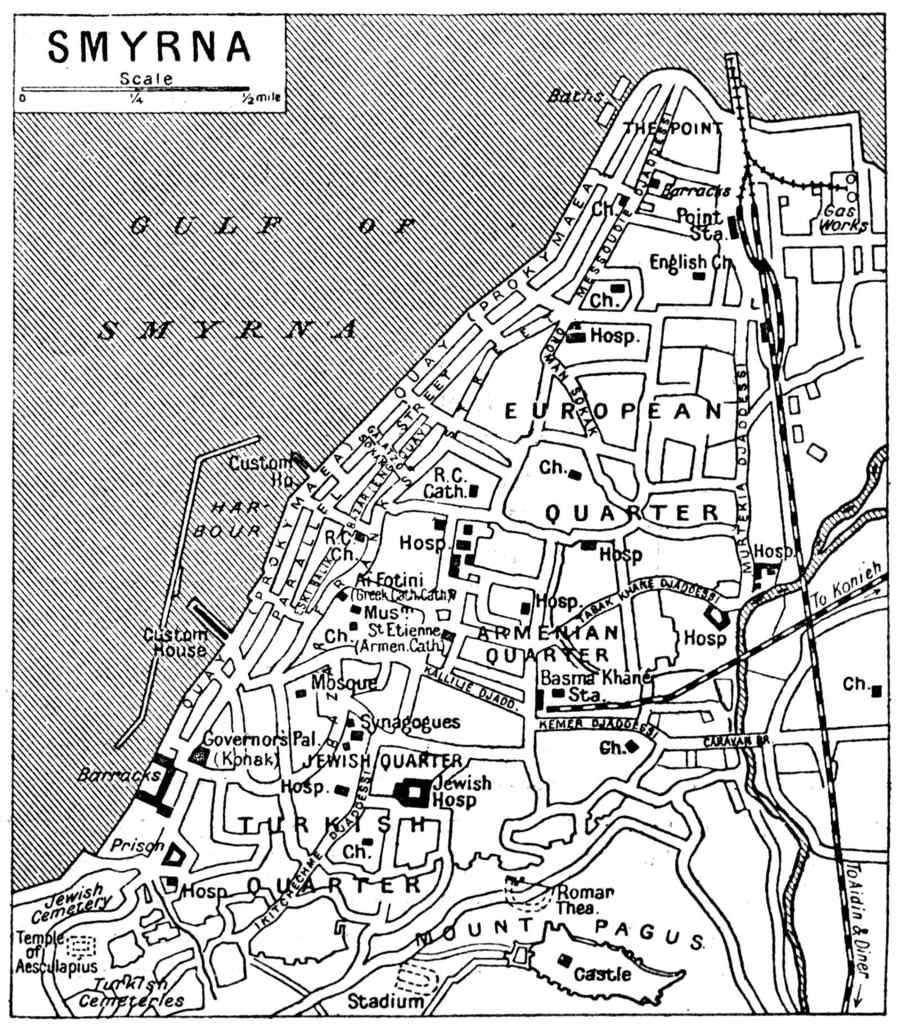
1922 map of Smyrna

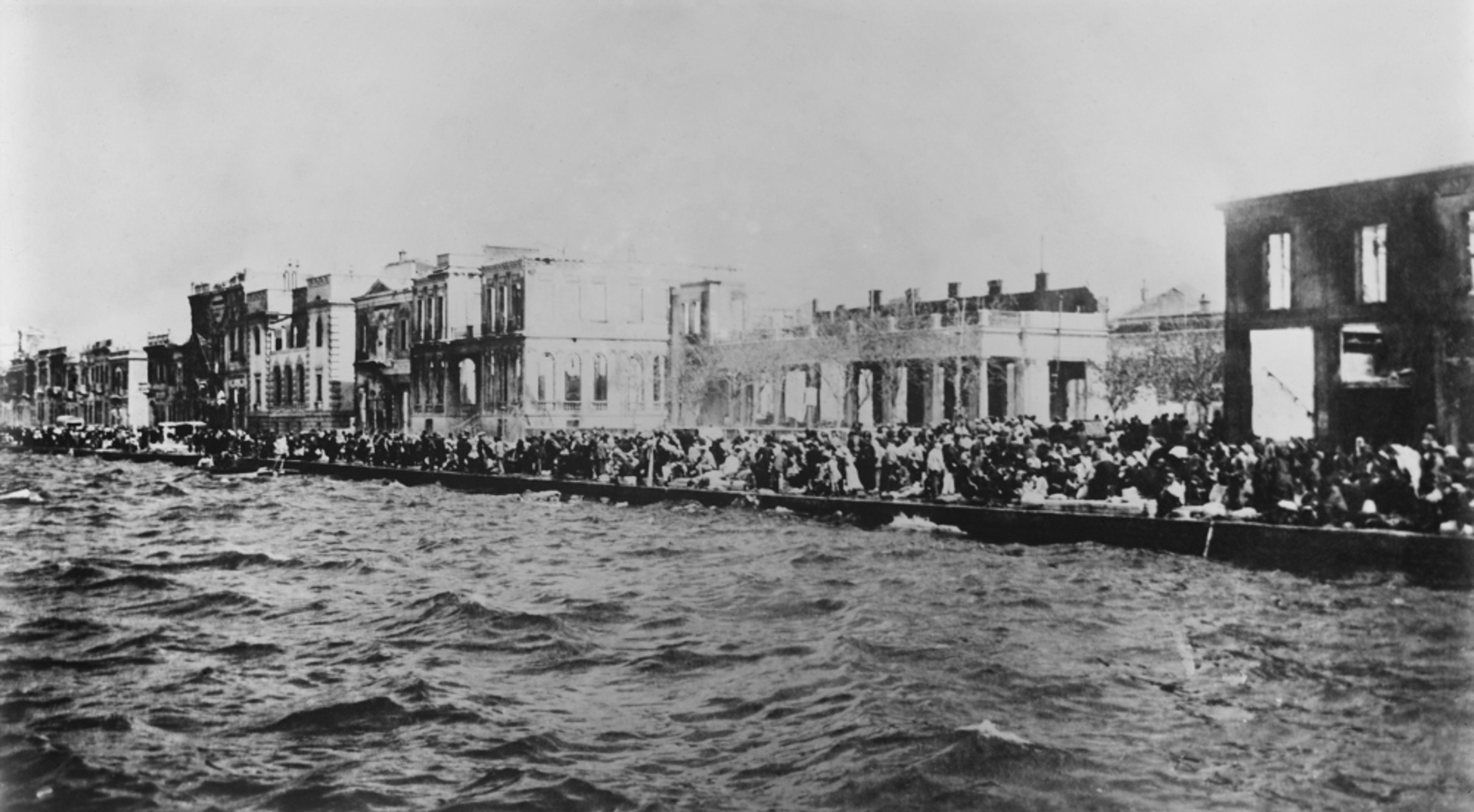
Buildings on fire and people trying to escape

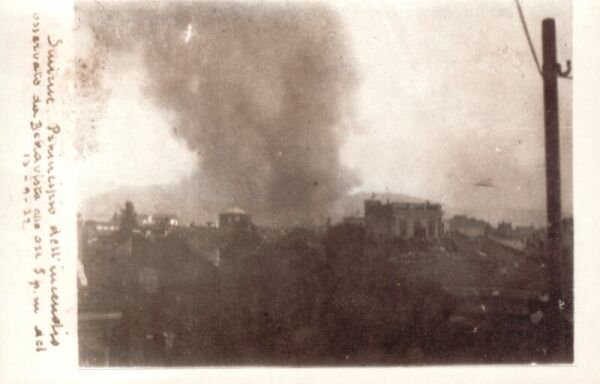
The start of the fire, seen from Bella Vista. 13 September 1922

The first fire broke out in the late afternoon of 13 September, four days after Turkish nationalist forces had entered the city. The blaze began in the Armenian quarter of the city (now the Basmane borough), and spread quickly due to the windy weather and the fact that no effort was made to put it out. Author Giles Milton writes:

One of the first people to notice the outbreak of fire was Miss Minnie Mills, the director of the American Collegiate Institute for Girls. She had just finished her lunch when she noticed that one of the neighboring buildings was burning. She stood up to have a closer look and was shocked by what she witnessed. "I saw with my own eyes a Turkish officer enter the house with small tins of petroleum or benzine and in a few minutes the house was in flames." She was not the only one at the institute to see the outbreak of fire. "Our teachers and girls saw Turks in regular soldiers' uniforms and in several cases in officers' uniforms, using long sticks with rags at the end which were dipped in a can of liquid and carried into houses which were soon burning.

Others, such as Claflin Davis of the American Red Cross and Monsieur Joubert, director of the Credit Foncier Bank of Smyrna, also witnessed the Turks putting buildings to the torch. When the latter asked the soldiers what they were doing, "They replied impassively that they were under orders to blow up and burn all the houses of the area." The city's fire brigade did its best to combat the fires but by Wednesday 13 September so many were being set that it was unable to keep up. Two firemen from the brigade, a Sgt. Tchorbadjis and Emmanuel Katsaros, would later testify in court witnessing Turkish soldiers setting fire to the buildings. When Katsaros complained, one of them commented, "You have your orders...and we have ours. This is Armenian property. Our orders are to set fire to it." The spreading fire caused a stampede of people to flee toward the quay, which stretched from the western end of the city to its northern tip, known as the Point. Captain Arthur Japy Hepburn, chief of staff of the American naval squadron, described the panic on the quay:

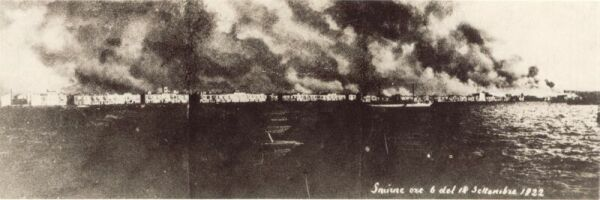
Panoramic view of the fire of Smyrna.

Returning to the street I found the stampede from the fire just beginning. All of the refugees that had been scattered through the streets or stowed in churches and other institutions were moving toward the waterfront. Steadily augmenting this flow were those abandoning their homes in the path of the fire...It was now dark. The quay was already filled with tens of thousands of terrified refugees moving aimlessly between the customs house and the point, and still the steady stream of new arrivals continued, until the entire waterfront seemed one solid mass of humanity and baggage of every description.

The heat from the fire was so intense that Hepburn was worried that the refugees would die as a result of it. The refugees' situation on the pier on the morning of 14 September was described by the British Lieutenant A. S. Merrill, who believed that the Turks had set the fire to keep the Greeks in a state of terror so as to facilitate their departure:

All morning the glow and then the flames of burning Smyrna could be seen. We arrived about an hour before dawn and the scene was indescribable. The entire city was ablaze and the harbor was light as day. Thousands of homeless refugees were surging back and forth on the blistering quay – panic stricken to the point of insanity. The heartrending shrieks of women and children were painful to hear. In a frenzy they would throw themselves into the water and some would reach the ship. To attempt to land a boat would have been disastrous. Several boats tried and were immediately stopped by the mad rush of a howling mob...The crowds along the quay beyond the fire were so thick and tried so desperately to close abreast the men-of-war anchorage that the masses in the stifling center could not escape except by sea. Fortunately there was a sea breeze and the quay wall never got hot enough to roast these unfortunate people alive, but the heat must have been terrific to have been felt in the ship 200 yards away. To add to the confusion, the packs belonging to these refugees – consisting mostly of carpets and clothing – caught fire, creating a chain of bonfires the length of the street.

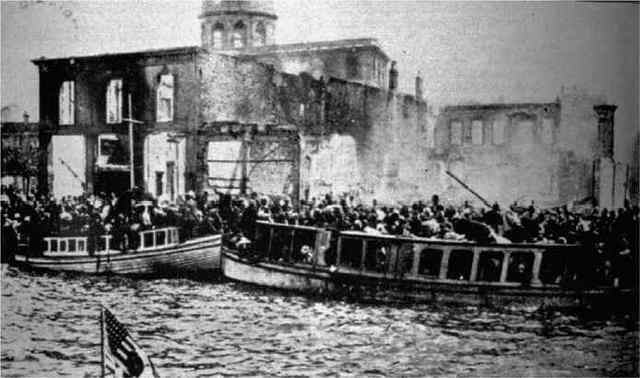
Overcrowded boats with refugees fleeing the fire. The photo was taken from the launch boat of a US warship.

Turkish troops cordoned off the Quay to box the Armenians and Greeks within the fire zone and prevent them from fleeing. Eyewitness reports describe panic-stricken refugees diving into the water to escape the flames and that their terrified screaming could be heard miles away. By 15 September the fire had somewhat died down, but sporadic violence by the Turks against the Greek and Armenian refugees kept the pressure on the Western and Greek navies to remove the refugees as quickly as possible. The fire was completely extinguished by 22 September, and on 24 September the first Greek ships – part of a flotilla organized and commandeered by the American humanitarian Asa Jennings, American commander Halsey Powell, and Captain Giannis Theofanides – entered the harbor to take passengers away, following Captain Hepburn's initiative and his having obtained permission and cooperation from the Turkish authorities and the British admiral in command of the destroyers in the harbor.

== Aftermath ==
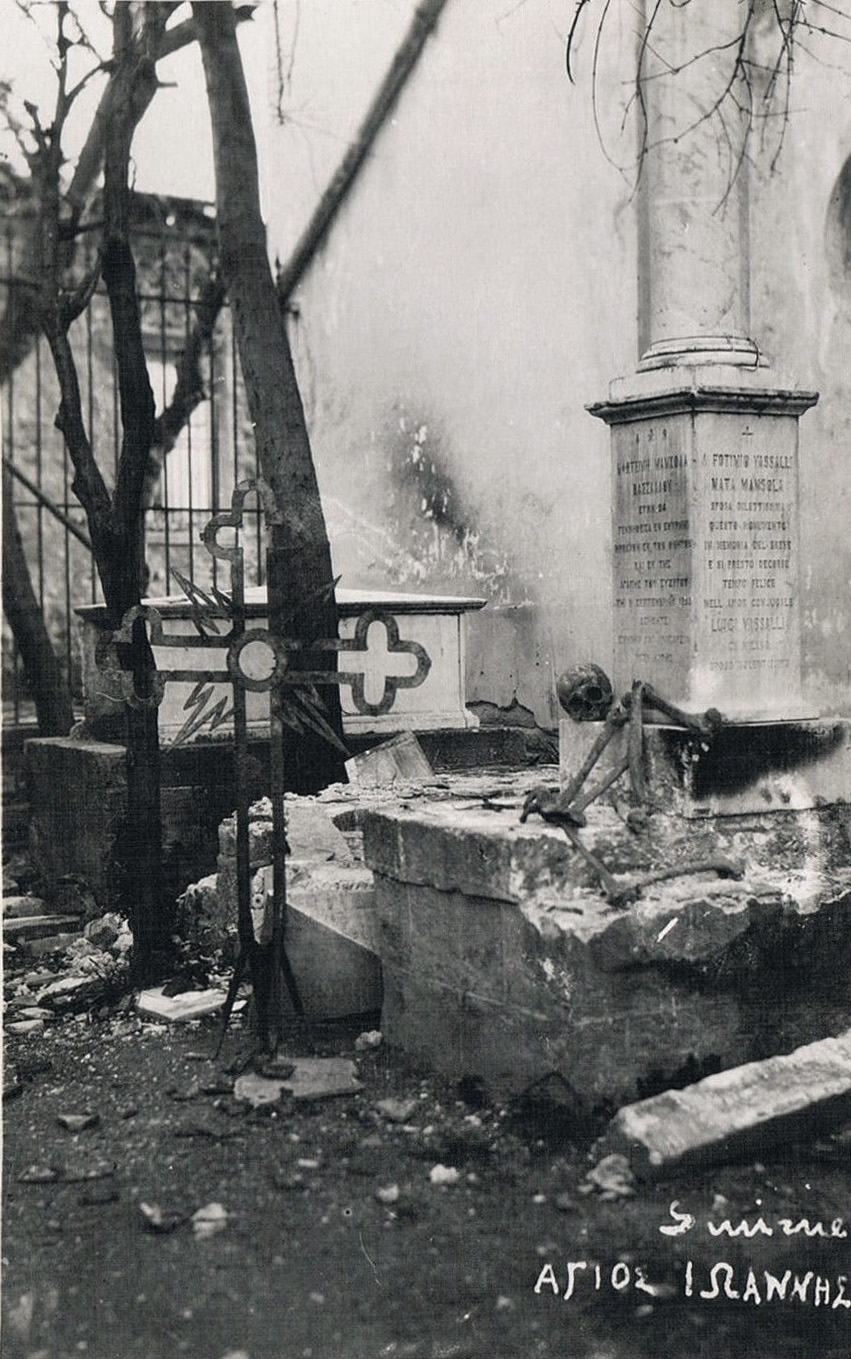
Desecrated graves at the Greek cemetery of Saint John

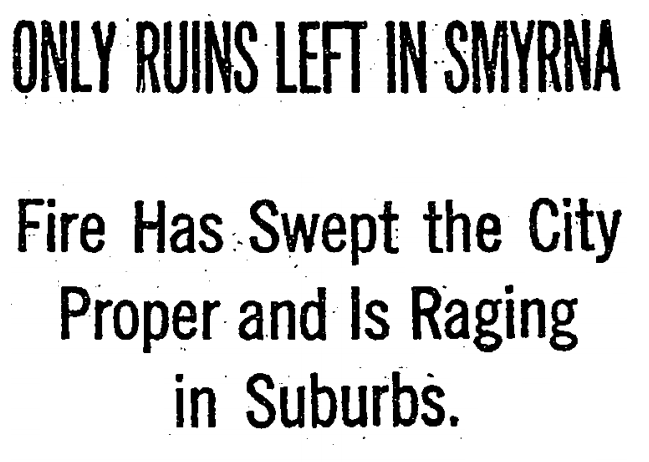
The headline from The New York Times report of the fire on 17 September 1922.

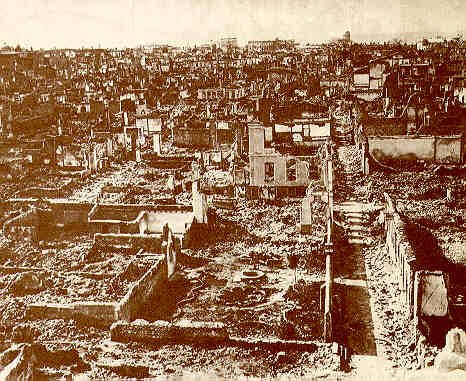
A view from the city after the fire, 15 September 1922

The entire city suffered substantial damage to its infrastructure. The core of the city had to be rebuilt. Today, 40 hectares of the former fire area is a vast park named Kültürpark serving as Turkey's largest open air exhibition center, including the İzmir International Fair, among others.

According to the first census in Turkey after the war, the total population of the city in 1927 was 184,254, of whom 162,144 (88%) were Muslims, the remainder numbering 22,110. The evacuation was difficult despite the efforts of British and American sailors to maintain order, as tens of thousands of refugees pushed and shoved towards the shore. Attempts to organize relief were made by the American officials from the YMCA and YWCA, who were reportedly robbed and later shot at by Turkish soldiers. On the quay, Turkish soldiers and irregulars periodically robbed Greek refugees, beating some and arresting others who resisted. Though there were several reports of well-behaved Turkish troops helping old women and trying to maintain order among the refugees, these are heavily outnumbered by those describing gratuitous cruelty, incessant robbery and violence.

American and British attempts to protect the Greeks from the Turks did little good, with the fire having taken a terrible toll. Some frustrated and terrified Greeks took their own lives, plunging into the water with packs at their back, children were stampeded, and many of the elderly fainted and died. The city's Armenians also suffered grievously, and according to Captain Hepburn, "every able-bodied Armenian man was hunted down and killed wherever found, with even boys aged 12 to 15 taking part in the hunt."

The fire completely destroyed the Greek, Armenian, and Western European quarters of the city, with only the Turkish and Jewish quarters surviving. The thriving port of Smyrna, one of the most commercially active in the region, was burned to the ground. Some 150,000–200,000 Greek refugees were evacuated, while approximately 30,000 able-bodied Greek and Armenian men were deported to the interior, many of them dying under the harsh conditions or executed along the way. The 3,000-year Greek presence on Anatolia's Aegean shore was brought to an abrupt end, along with the Megali Idea. The Greek writer Dimitris Pentzopoulos wrote, "It is no exaggeration to call the year '1922' the most calamitous in modern Hellenic history."

=== Casualties and refugees ===
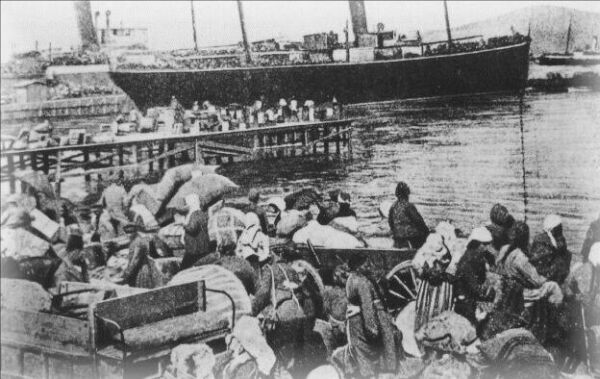
Refugees

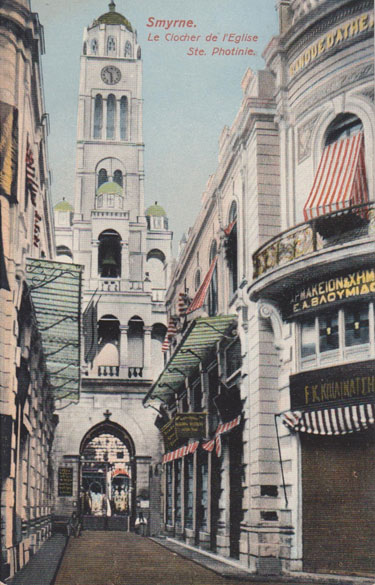
Belltower of Greek Orthodox Cathedral of Saint Fotini. Turkish nationalist forces set dynamite charges and blew it up.

According to historian A. J. Hobbins, before the Greco-Turkish War, Smyrna had 267,000 inhabitants, consisting of 140,000 Greeks (52.4%), 80,000 Turks (30%), 12,000 Armenians (5.6%), 20,000 Jews (7.5%), and 15,000 Western Europeans and Americans (4.5%). This number was subsequently inflated by the resettlement of at least 100,000 Greek civilian refugees in the city between 1919 and 1922, as well as by tens or hundreds of thousands of Greek civilian refugees fleeing the Anatolian interior in August 1922, as the Greek Army retreated, bringing the total to perhaps 400,000 Christians in the city.

The number of casualties from the fire is not precisely known, with estimates of up to 180,000 Greeks and Armenians killed.

Norman Naimark gives a figure of 10,000–15,000 dead, but also adds 30,000 Greek and Armenian men who were deported to Anatolia's interior, where most of them died under brutal conditions. Richard Clogg estimates the dead at 30,000, John Freely at 50,000, Rudolf Rummel and Edward Hale Bierstadt (Note: Bierstadt was an eyewitness to the events and the Executive Secretary of the Emergency Committee for Near East Refugees.) at 100,000, and Philip Mansel at up to 180,000. Historian Ellinor Morack summarizes:

Estimates for the number of deaths range from as little as several thousand (Norman M. Naimark) to between 80,000 and 180,000 (Mansel). Norman M. Naimark, Fires of Hatred: Ethnic Cleansing in Twentieth-Century Europe (Cambridge, MA: Harvard University Press, 2002), p.52 and Mansel, Levant, p.220. I think that Biray Kolluoğlu's estimation of no less than 100,000 victims is more convincing. She has arrived at this number by calculating the reported number of Christian residents and refugees in the city against that of the survivors who were evacuated to Greece. Kolluoğlu Kırlı, 'Forgetting', p.31.

Morack also writes: "The overall death toll of the fire has been estimated at between 80,000 and 180,000 – the higher estimate seems to be more accurate". Turkish scholar Sait Çetinoğlu agrees that the figure of no less than 100,000 deaths is reasonable and trustworthy, adding that "before the fire, 400,000 Christians lived in Smyrna and by October 1, there was no information on 190,000 of those Christians".

Help to the city's population by ships of the Hellenic Navy was limited, as the 11 September 1922 Revolution had broken out, and most of the Greek army was concentrated at the islands of Chios and Lesbos, planning to overthrow the royalist government of Athens.

Although there were numerous ships from various Allied powers in the harbor of Smyrna, the vast majority of them cited neutrality and did not pick up Greeks and Armenians who were forced to flee from the fire and the Turkish troops retaking the city after the Greek army's defeat. However, a Japanese freighter, Tokei Maru, dumped all of its cargo and took on as many refugees as possible, taking them to the Greek port of Piraeus. Military bands played loud music to drown out the screams of those who were drowning in the harbor and who were forcefully prevented from boarding Allied ships.

Around 1540 refugees were evacuated by British ships which disembarked at Malta between 15 September and 10 December; most of these were British nationals or subjects (including Smyrniots of Maltese descent and some Cypriots). Other refugees evacuated by the British landed at Cyprus.

Many refugees were rescued via an impromptu relief flotilla organized by American missionary Asa Jennings. Other scholars give a different account of the events; they argue that the Turks first forbade foreign ships in the harbor to pick up the survivors, but, under pressure especially from Britain, France, and the United States, they allowed the rescue of all the Christians except males 17 to 45 years old. They intended to deport the latter into the interior, which "was regarded as a short life sentence to slavery under brutal masters, ended by mysterious death".

The number of refugees changes according to the source. Some contemporary newspapers claim that there were 400,000 Greek and Armenian refugees from Smyrna and the surrounding area who received Red Cross aid immediately after the destruction of the city. Stewart Matthew states that there were 250,000 refugees who were all non-Turks. Naimark gives a figure of 150,000–200,000 Greek refugees evacuated. Edward Hale Bierstadt and Helen Davidson Creighton say that there were at least 50,000 Greek and Armenian refugees. Some contemporary accounts also suggest the same number.

The number of Greek and Armenian men deported to the interior of Anatolia and the number of consequent deaths varies across sources. Naimark writes that 30,000 Greek and Armenian men were deported there, where most of them died under brutal conditions. Dimitrije Đorđević puts the number of deportees at 25,000 and the number of deaths at labour battalions at 10,000. David Abulafia states that at least 100,000 Greeks were forcibly sent to the interior of Anatolia, where most of them died.

Aristotle Onassis, who was born in Smyrna and who later became one of the richest men in the world, was one of the Greek survivors. The various biographies of his life document aspects of his experiences during the Smyrna catastrophe. His life experiences were featured in the TV movie called Onassis, The Richest Man in the World.

During the Smyrna catastrophe, the Onassis family lost substantial property holdings, which were either taken or given to Turks as bribes to secure their safety and freedom. They became refugees, fleeing to Greece after the fire. However, Aristotle Onassis stayed behind to save his father, who had been placed in a Turkish concentration camp. He was successful in saving his father's life. During this period three of his uncles died. He also lost an aunt, her husband Chrysostomos Konialidis, and their daughter, who were burned to death when Turkish soldiers set fire to a church in Thyatira, where 500 Christians had found shelter to avoid Turkish soldiers and the burning of Smyrna.

==== Western European casualties and refugees ====
Excluding Greeks and Armenians, who bore the brunt of the atrocities, Western Europeans were also attacked by the Turks and their quarter was also destroyed. Several residents of the Western European quarter were massacred and a Catholic priest was stoned. In addition, French Catholic schools were brutalized. French refugees "cursed their government for its folly in toadying to the Turks; everything had been lost, nothing gained". A French Red Cross nurse was assaulted by a Turkish irregular, but was shot to death by a French sailor.

Americans weren't spared from the Turkish carnage either. U.S. Sergeant Crocker and Canadian-Scottish doctor Alexander MacLachlan were stripped naked and beaten with clubs and rifles. Dr. Cass Arthur Reed, a resident of Smyrna, reported how: "every American house at Paradise [the American part of the Western European quarter] had American flags, back and front and all have been broken into with the exception of two". In addition, Turkish soldiers were seen purposely directing the fire towards the U.S. Consulate by laying down a path of flammable liquid. Many Americans and their relatives also went missing. At least 50 American citizens were reported to have been rounded up, imprisoned and planned for a death march to the Anatolian interior. Everett P. Wheeler complained that: "It is an indelible disgrace to America that we have suffered our citizens in Asia Minor to be killed, their property seized and their business broken up and destroyed without any forcible intervention".

On 9 September, Dutch merchant Oscar de Jongh and his wife were murdered by Turkish cavalrymen, while in another incident the retired British-Irish doctor Patrick Murphy was murdered in his home, while trying to prevent the rape of a servant girl. The Dutch hospital was reduced to ashes, whereas the Dutch cemetery was violated and destroyed, with its graves being desecrated by Turkish soldiers. The German Protestant Church in Smyrna was burnt to the ground, alongside the German Community Center. Italians were also murdered. The mother of the Italian businessman Theodore Bartoli was hit by a stray bullet and killed, while his two sisters committed suicide when Turks broke into their house, preferring to kill themselves than to get raped and killed by the Turks.

== Responsibility ==
The Scotsman (18 September 1922) describing the burning of Smyrna, including the looting of churches, schools and foreign consulates, the discovery of mutilated and burned bodies, and the rape and massacre of women and girls

Turkish sources mostly attribute responsibility to Greeks or Armenians, and vice versa. Other sources, on the other hand, suggest that at the very least, Turkish inactivity played a significant part on the event. There is a historical consensus that the fire was caused by Turkish soldiers in order to completely eradicate the Christian presence in Anatolia.

A number of studies have been published on the Smyrna fire. Professor of literature Marjorie Housepian Dobkin's 1971 study Smyrna 1922 concluded that the Turkish army systematically burned the city and killed Christian Greek and Armenian inhabitants. Her work is based on extensive eyewitness testimony from survivors, Allied troops sent to Smyrna during the evacuation, foreign diplomats, relief workers, and Turkish eyewitnesses. A study by historian Niall Ferguson comes to the same conclusion. Historian Richard Clogg categorically states that the fire was started by the Turks following their capture of the city. In his book Paradise Lost: Smyrna 1922, Giles Milton addresses the issue of the Smyrna Fire through original material (interviews, unpublished letters, and diaries) from the Levantine families of Smyrna, who were mainly of British origin. The conclusion of the author is that it was Turkish soldiers and officers who set the fire, most probably acting under direct orders. British scholar Michael Llewellyn-Smith, writing on the Greek administration in Asia Minor, also concluded that the fire was "probably lit" by the Turks as indicated by what he called "what evidence there is." Some, including Süleyman Külçe and Tessa Hofmann, blame Nureddin Pasha, in particular, for ordering the fire.

Stanford historian Norman Naimark has evaluated the evidence regarding the responsibility of the fire. He agrees with the view of American Lieutenant Merrill that it was in Turkish interests to terrorize Greeks into leaving Smyrna with the fire, and points out to the "odd" fact that the Turkish quarter was spared from the fire as a factor suggesting Turkish responsibility. He also points out that arguments can be made that burning the city was against Turkish interests and was unnecessary and that responsibility may lie with Greeks and/or Armenians as they "had own their good reasons", pointing out to the "Greek history of retreating" and "Armenian attack in the first day of the occupation". However, the Greek army departed from Smyrna on 9 September 1922, when Mustafa Kemal Atatürk and his army entered the city, while the fire began four days later, on 13 September 1922. Nevertheless, Naimark concludes that "the fire almost assuredly was purposely set by the Turkish troops".

Horton and Housepian are criticized by Heath W. Lowry and Justin McCarthy, who argue that Horton was highly prejudiced and Housepian makes an extremely selective use of sources. Lowry and McCarthy were both members of the now defunct Institute of Turkish Studies and have in turn been strongly criticized by other scholars for their denial of the Armenian Genocide and McCarthy has been described by Michael Mann as being on "the Turkish side of the debate."

Turkish author and journalist Falih Rıfkı Atay, who was in Smyrna at the time, and the Turkish professor Biray Kolluoğlu Kırlı agreed that Turkish nationalist forces were responsible for the destruction of Smyrna in 1922. More recently, a number of non-contemporary scholars, historians, and politicians have added to the history of the events by revisiting contemporary communications and histories. Leyla Neyzi, in her work on the oral history regarding the fire, makes a distinction between Turkish nationalist discourse and local narratives. In the local narratives, she points to the Turkish forces being held responsible for at least not attempting to extinguish the fire effectively, or, at times, being held responsible for the fire itself.

== Legacy and remembrance ==
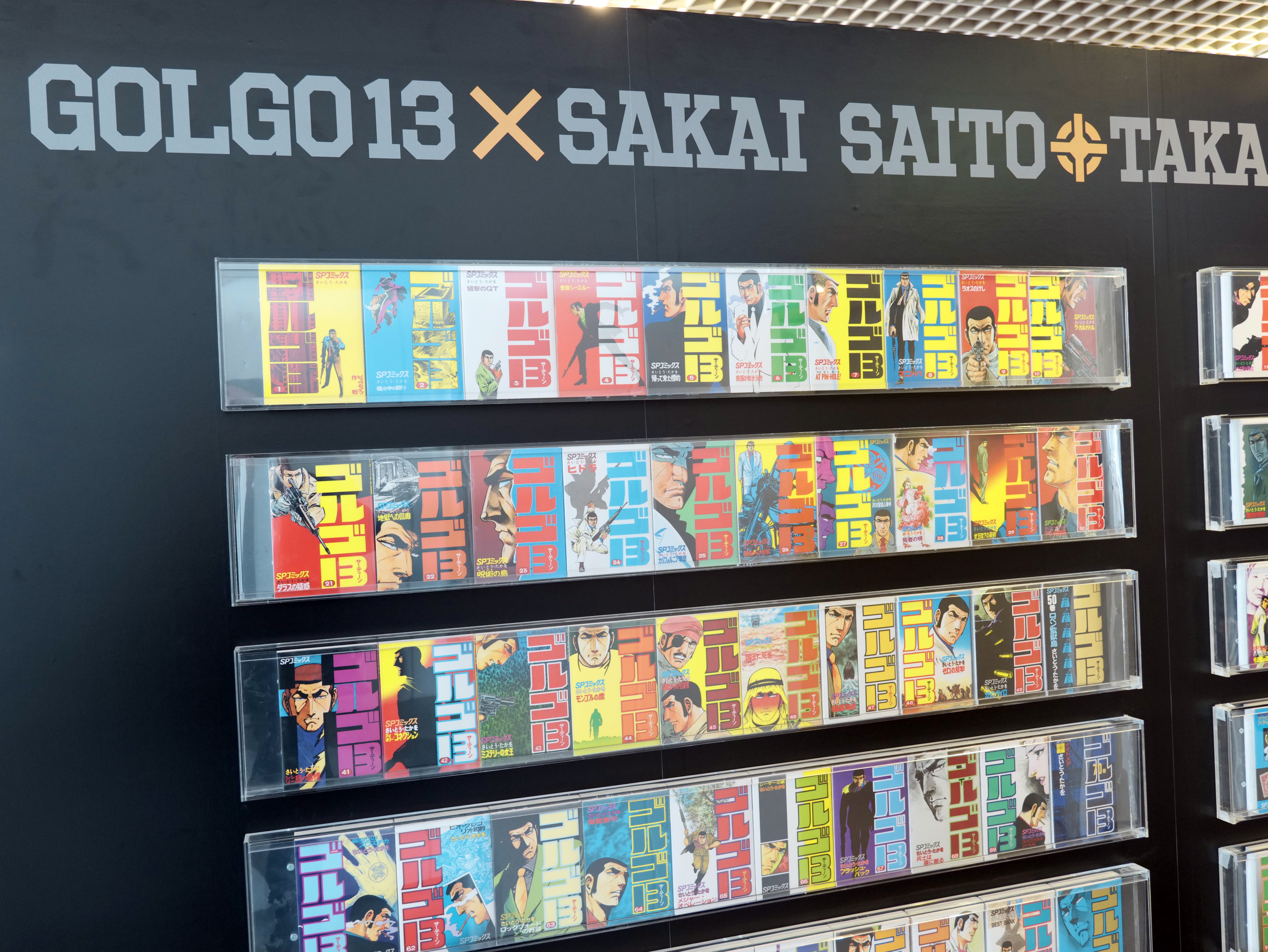
In Volume 228 of the Japanese manga Golgo 13, there is a reference to the Burning of Smyrna, recounting the story in which the Japanese protected Smyrna's Christian civilians from the Turks

- Robert Byron's travelogue Europe in the Looking Glass (1926) contains an eyewitness report, placing the blame for the fire upon the Turks.
- "On the Quai at Smyrna" (1930), a short story published as part of In Our Time, by Ernest Hemingway, alludes to the fire of Smyrna:

The strange thing was, he said, how they screamed every night at midnight ... We were in the harbour and they were on the pier and at midnight they started screaming. We used to turn the searchlight on them to quiet them. That always did the trick.

- Eric Ambler's novel The Mask of Dimitrios (1939) details the events at Smyrna at the opening of chapter 3.
- The closing section of the 1977 novel Sinai Tapestry, by Edward Whittemore, takes place during the burning of Smyrna.
- The Greek film 1922 (1978) portrays the suffering of ethnic Greeks held as prisoners following the Turkish army entering the city.
- Part of the 1985 novel The Titan, by Fred Mustard Stewart, takes place during the burning of Smyrna.
- Susanna de Vries Blue Ribbons Bitter Bread (2000) is an account of Smyrna and the Greek refugees who landed at Thessaloniki.
- The novel Middlesex (2002) by American Jeffrey Eugenides opens with the burning of Smyrna.
- Mehmet Coral's İzmir: 13 Eylül 1922 ("İzmir: 13 September 1922") (2003?) addressed this topic; it was also published in the Greek language by Kedros of Athens/Greece under the title: Πολλές ζωές στη Σμύρνη (Many lives in İzmir).
- Greek-American singer-songwriter Diamanda Galas's album Defixiones: Will and Testament (2003) is directly inspired by the Turkish atrocities committed against the Greek population at Smyrna. Galas is descended from a family who originated from Smyrna.
- Part of the novel Birds Without Wings (2004) by Louis De Bernieres takes place during the burning of Smyrna and its aftermath.
- Panos Karnezis's 2004 novel The Maze deals with historical events involving and related to the fire at Smyrna.
- "Smyrna: The Destruction of a Cosmopolitan City – 1900–1922", a 2012 documentary film by Maria Ilioú.
- Deli Sarkis Sarkisian's personal account of the fire of Smyrna is related in Ellen Sarkisian Chesnut's The Scars He Carried, A Daughter Confronts The Armenian Genocide and Tells Her Father's Story (2014).
- Smyrna in Flames (2021) by Homero Aridjis, is a historical novel inspired by the written recollections and memories of the author's father, Nicias Aridjis; a captain in the Greek army during the Smyrna Catastrophe.
- The 2021 Greek film Smyrna, My Beloved follows the lives of a wealthy Greek family in Smyrna and their suffering and exodus after the Smyrna catastrophe.
- Fuar: a Counter-Memory, a 2022 short animation by Ezgi Özbakkaloğlu, juxtaposes drawn black and white images of the ruins of Smyrna with colorful animated impressions of the urban park that was later built on the site.
- Smyrna: Paradise is Burning, The Asa K. Jennings Story, a 2022 documentary produced by Mike Damergis; won the Best Historical Film award in the Cannes World Film Festival (May 2022).
- The Illinois Holocaust Museum and the Asia Minor and Pontos Hellenic Research Center hosted a 100th anniversary educational event on September 18, 2022 remembering the Fire of Smyrna and the Greek genocide.

== See also ==
- Outline and timeline of the Greek genocide
- Great Thessaloniki Fire of 1917
- Fire of Manisa
- Scorched Earth
- List of massacres in Turkey
