= Relief Committee for Greeks of Asia Minor =

Relief organization established during World War I

Greek genocide

Background
- Young Turk Revolution, Ottoman Greeks, Pontic Greeks, Ottoman Empire

The genocide
- Labour battalions, Death march, Pontic Greek genocide, Phocaea massacre, Evacuation of Ayvalik, İzmit massacres, 1914 Greek deportations, Samsun deportations, Amasya trials, Burning of Smyrna

Resistance
- Greek resistance during the Greek genocide, Anton Pasha, Efkleidis Kourtidis

Foreign aid and relief
- Relief Committee for Greeks of Asia Minor, American Committee for Relief in the Near East, Asa Jennings

Responsible parties
- Young Turks or Committee of Union and Progress; Three Pashas: Talat, Enver, Djemal; Bahaeddin Şakir, Teskilati Mahsusa or Special Organization, Nureddin Pasha, Topal Osman, Mustafa Kemal Atatürk

See also
- Greco-Turkish War (1919–1922), Greeks in Turkey, Population Exchange, Greek refugees, Armenian genocide, Assyrian genocide, Diyarbekir genocide, Istanbul trials of 1919–1920, Malta Tribunals

The Relief Committee for Greeks of Asia Minor (1917–1921) was a relief organization established during World War I in response to the genocide of Greeks in the Ottoman Empire. The committee was also known as simply the Greek Relief Committee.

== Executive Board ==
- Chairman: Frank W. Jackson
- Honorary Chairman: Jacob Gould Schurman
- Vice-Chairman: Basile D. Dugundji
- Secretary: John P. Xenides
- Treasurer: Abraham E. Kazan (resigned in November 1917), Rollin P. Grant

== Operations ==
The GRC worked through a network of foreign consuls, missionaries and relief workers located at various points in the Ottoman Empire. In doing so, its working methods were similar to those of the American Committee for Armenian and Syrian Relief (ACASR), which was also in action during World War I. It also cooperated with American diplomatic institutions in Athens and Thessaloniki to aid refugees arriving from Turkey.
