= İzmit massacres =

Greco-Turkish War (1919–1922) atrocities

- Part of the Greek genocide
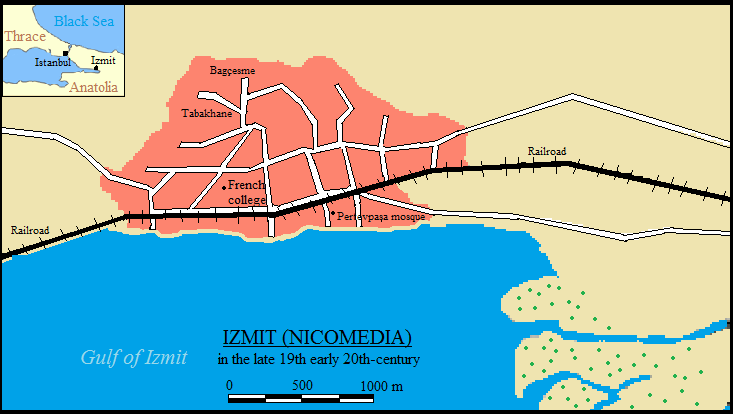
- Town map with significant locations.
- Date: March 1920 – June 1921
- Location: İzmit district, Ottoman Empire
- Type: Ethnic cleansing, genocidal massacre, mass murder
- Motive: Anti-Greek sentiment, Turkification, Turkish nationalism
- Participants: (mainly) Turkish nationalist Army and irregulars, on a minor scale: native Greeks, Hellenic Army (insubordinate role), Circassian mercenaries
- Deaths: 12,000 by the Turkish Army (+ 2,500 missing); ~ 300 by the Greek Army

Greek genocide

Background
- Young Turk Revolution, Ottoman Greeks, Pontic Greeks, Ottoman Empire

The genocide
- Labour battalions, Death march, Pontic Greek genocide, Phocaea massacre, Evacuation of Ayvalik, İzmit massacres, 1914 Greek deportations, Samsun deportations, Amasya trials, Burning of Smyrna

Foreign aid and relief
- Relief Committee for Greeks of Asia Minor, American Committee for Relief in the Near East

Responsible parties
- Young Turks or Committee of Union and Progress; Three Pashas: Talat, Enver, Djemal; Bahaeddin Şakir, Teskilati Mahsusa or Special Organization, Nureddin Pasha, Topal Osman, Mustafa Kemal Atatürk

See also
- Greco-Turkish War (1919–1922), Greeks in Turkey, Population Exchange, Greek refugees, Armenian genocide, Assyrian genocide, Diyarbekir genocide, Istanbul trials of 1919–1920, Malta Tribunals

The İzmit massacres were atrocities committed in the region of İzmit, Turkey, during the Greco-Turkish War (1919–1922) which took place during the Greek genocide. An Inter-Allied Commission of Enquiry that investigated the incidents submitted a report on 1 June 1921 about the events.

== Background ==
Ethnic cleansing policies undertaken by the Ottoman government were launched in various regions of the Ottoman Empire, including the Izmit region as early as 1915. This included the massive deportation of local Greek and Armenian communities. In 1915, The New York Times reported that 19,000 Greeks from the Izmit province had been uprooted from their homes and driven to purely Turkish districts. The Armenian Metropolitan of Izmit, Stephan Hovakimian stated, that, of the 80,000 Armenians belonging to his Diocese, 70,000 had been lost in exile, succumbing to hunger and exhaustion from long marches, and the slaughter of men and women upon arrival at their destination. Later, in 1918, after the Armistice of Mudros a number of attacks by nationalist bands against the local Christian population were reported.

== Incidents ==
This violence increased against the local Greek population, from March 1920 and especially during June–July 1920, when the advance of the Hellenic Army in the region was imminent. These groups were operating as far as Üsküdar, while some of them were organized by the Turkish Nationalist Movement.

As a result of this activity, several villages of the region were burnt and their inhabitants killed, especially in the regions south, north and northeast of Adapazarı, as well as south and southeast of Iznik.

The presence of the Hellenic Army in the region from July 1920, limited the activity of the Turkish bands, although in Karamürsel, south of the Gulf of İzmit, some Turkish nationalist groups were still attacking surrounding villages inhabited by Greek populations.

Later, the Hellenic Army in the region, was accused of supporting assaults against some villages east of Beykoz. Accusations included the killing of civilians and the burning of small settlements. Accusations also included violence perpetrated by local Greek civilians who had previously suffered from Turkish atrocities

From the spring of 1921, the activity of the Turkish bands increased in the region extending geographically to the south of Izmit, which resulted in the destruction of the Christian villages there.

== Evacuation of Izmit ==
In the early summer of 1921, due to the developments of the ongoing Greco-Turkish War, the retreat of the Hellenic Army was imminent. According to the British High Commission, 33,000 people were evacuated. Of these, approximately 21,000 were Greeks, 9,000 were Armenians, and 3,000 were Turks and Circassians. They were distributed as follows:

- 7,600 to Volos
- 4,000 to Tekirdağ
- 3,000 to Pyrgo (Greece)
- 4,500 to Lemnos
- 3,800 to Samos
- 8,000 to Mytilene

== Aftermath ==
An Inter-Allied Commission of Enquiry that investigated the incidents in the region generally accepted the claims by Greek authorities that 32 villages had been looted or burned, and that more than 12,000 local civilians had been massacred by Turkish forces, and 2,500 were missing. The Commission accepted these figures as "fundamentally true, notwithstanding a certain amount of exaggeration in the figures".

According to British journalist and latter historian, Arnold Toynbee, as a result of the activities of the Hellenic Army and irregulars, up to 300 persons were killed. Toynbee in general omits to notice the conclusion of the Allied commission. Moreover, Winston Churchill, stated that the Greek atrocities were "on a minor scale" compared to the "appalling deportations of Greeks from the Trebizond and Samsun provinces", which were undertaken by the Turkish nationalists in the same year.

== Partial list of affected settlements ==
The Allied commission concluded that 35 villages in the region were affected due to the activity of Turkish nationalist bands. A partial list of the villages according to Greek reports:

- Fulacık (Greek: Φουλατζίκ): Looted, burned and population partially massacred. According to Kostas Faltaits who recorded the testimony of one of the survivors, the looting and massacre began on 23 June 1920. Turkish regulars and irregulars were under the command of Kemal, the political administrator of Karamursel. 300 men and boys 14 and older were locked inside the church of St. George before it was doused with petrol and set alight.
- Büyük Saraçlı
- Papuççular (burned)
- Kara Tepe (Gr: Καρα Τεπέ): Looted, partially burned, town's church bombed, population massacred. According to journalist Kostas Faltaits who interviewed a survivor of the massacre at Kara Tepe, the town was first looted on 15 May 1920. But on 25 March 1921, Kemalists returned and continued the looting and also massacred the population.
- Küplü (Gr: Κιουπλιά): Partial massacre, racketeering, looting, partial deportation to interior.
- Iznik (Gr: Nicaea/Νικαία): On 27 August 1920, a large band of Nationalists led by a certain Djemal (otherwise spelt Cemal), surrounded the Greek quarter of Iznik, seized the entire population numbering about 600, and massacred them. No survivors had been found.
- Fındıklı (Gr: Φουντούκλια): 4 villages, population partially massacred, looting, rape. According to journalist Kostas Faltaits who interviewed a survivor of the massacre, the events started on 20 June 1920. All 500 homes were burnt and out of 2,500 Christians less than half survived. Girls were raped in front of their mothers. Kemalist soldiers were under the command of Hadji Bey.
- Lefke
- Ortaköy: Completely burnt, looting, rape, massacre. According to an eye witness testimony, the majority of the 10,000 Greeks of Ortaköy were massacred. The events began in March 1920 when regular and irregular Kemalist forces arrived under the command of the kaymakam of Geyve, Hamid Bey. Civilians were beheaded and massacred with knives and hatchets.
- Eşme
- Konzes (Gr: Κόνζες): Looted and its inhabitants massacred. According to journalist Kostas Faltaits who interviewed a survivor, the looting and massacre started on 18 February 1921. Djemal (otherwise spelt Cemal) of Nicaea (Iznik) directed the looting and massacre, along with Sekip (the Tax Collector of Karamursel) and other civil servants, officers, lieutenants and corporals. A contingent of the Hellenic Army arrived at Konzes on 20 February 1921 and saw the land covered with corpses, men's and women's clothes, hands, feet, noses, ears and fingers.
- Ak Hisar
- Düzce
- Bolu
- Karasu, 14 villages (among them Kestane Pınarı, Parali, İncirli, Çoban Yatak, Kirazlı, Kas Başı)

== See also ==
- Outline and timeline of the Greek genocide
- Greek genocide
- Yalova Peninsula Massacres (1920–21)
- List of massacres during the Greco-Turkish War (1919–22)
- Armenian genocide
- Amasya trials
- List of massacres in Turkey

== Sources ==
- Reports on Atrocities in the Districts of Yalova and Guemlek and in the Ismid Peninsula. 1921. pp. 9–11.
- Evdoridou, Agapi. "The Greek Population of Ismit (Nicomedia) and its Periphery" (in Greek). University of Thessaloniki.
- Shenk, Robert (2012). America's Black Sea fleet the U.S. Navy amidst war and revolution, 1919-1923. Annapolis, Md.: Naval Institute Press. ISBN 9781612513027.
- Solomonidis, Victoria (1984). "Greece in Asia Minor: The Greek Administration in the Vilayet of Aydin" (PDF). University of London, King's College.
- Faltaits, Kostas (2016). The Genocide of the Greeks in Turkey: Survivor Testimonies from the Nicomedia (Izmit) Massacres of 1920-1921. U.S.A: Cosmos Publishing. ISBN 9781932455281.
- Yeghiayan, Vartkes, ed. (2007). British Reports on Ethnic Cleansing in Anatolia, 1919-1922: The Armenian-Greek Section. USA: Center for Armenian Remembrance. ISBN 9780977715329.
- Angelou, Michail (2013). Asia Minor Tragedy: An Eye-Witness Testimony (in Greek). Athens: Kiriakatiki.
