= Asa Jennings =

American Methodist minister (c. 1877-1933)

Asa Jenings
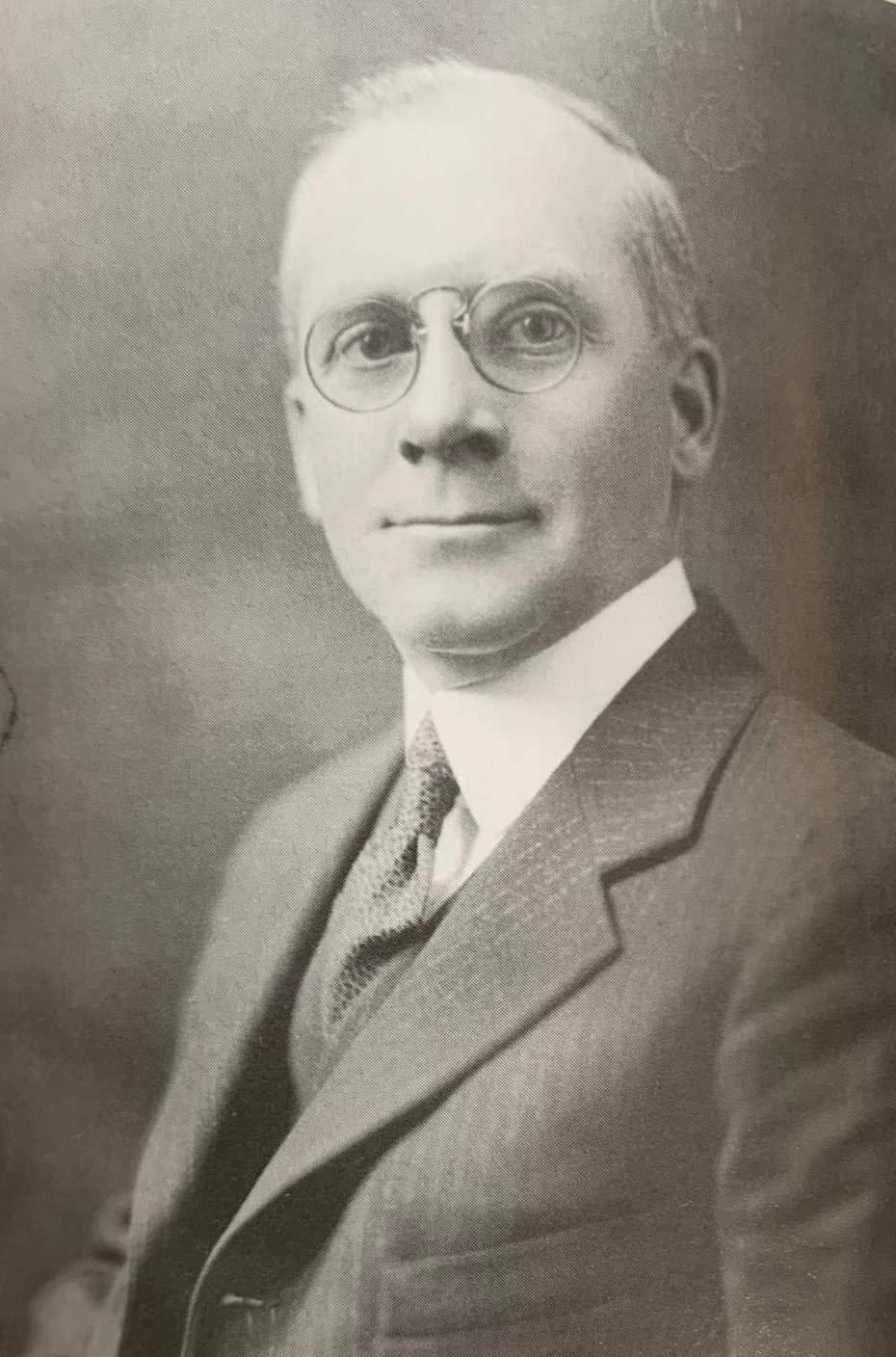
- Portrait of Asa Jennings
- Born: c. 1877; New York
- Died: c. 1933
- Occupation: Pastor
- Known for: Commanding the evacuation of hundreds of thousands of refugees during the Great Fire of Smyrna
- Awards: Order of the Redeemer; Medal of Military Merit

Asa Kent Jennings (c. 1877–1933) was a Methodist pastor from upstate New York and a member of the YMCA. In 1901 he became the membership secretary of the Utica, New York YMCA: he would later become the general secretary for the Carthage, New York, YMCA. In 1904, while in his twenties, Jennings was struck down by Pott's disease, a type of tuberculosis which affects the spine. As a result of his tuberculosis, he stood not much taller than 5 foot and with a noticeable hunch back. He began international work in 1918, as a regional secretary for the YMCA in France and Czechoslovakia.

In 1922, he, alongside Commander Halsey Powell and Captain Giannis Theofanides, played prominent roles in the evacuation of hundreds of thousands of helpless Christian refugees from the shores of Smyrna (today İzmir) in Turkey following the Great Fire of Smyrna. For his work, Greece awarded Jennings its highest civilian honour, the Order of the Redeemer, and the highest war honour, the Medal of Military Merit.

In 1945, MGM Studios made a 10-minute short film based on the life of Asa Jennings. In 2022, a documentary featuring Asa K. Jennings and his efforts to save the refugees was produced by Mike Damergis. Smyrna - Paradise is Burning, The Asa K. Jennings story, was awarded Best Historical Film by Cannes World Film Festival (May).
