= Outline of the Greek genocide =

Overview and topical guide of the Greek genocide

- Part of World War I, the Aftermath of World War I, and the Armenian genocide
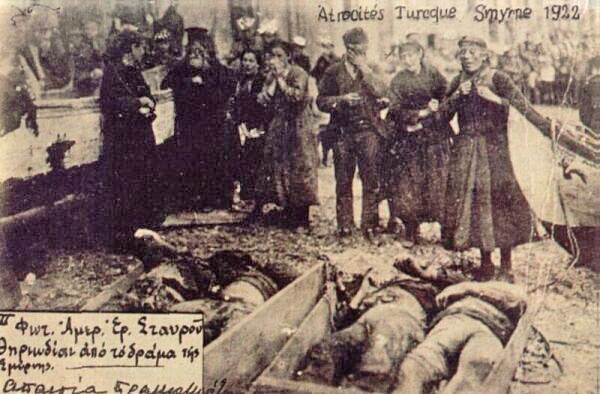
- Greek civilians mourn their dead relatives, Great Fire of Smyrna, 1922
- Location: Ottoman Empire
- Date: 1913–1923
- Target: Ottoman Greeks
- Attack type: Deportation, mass murder, death march
- Deaths: 300,000–900,000
- Perpetrators: Ottoman Empire, Turkish National Movement
- Motive: Anti-Greek sentiment, Turkification, Persecution of Eastern Orthodox Christians

Greek genocide

Background
- Young Turk Revolution, Ottoman Greeks, Pontic Greeks, Ottoman Empire

The genocide
- Labour battalions, Death march, Pontic Greek genocide, Phocaea massacre, Evacuation of Ayvalik, İzmit massacres, 1914 Greek deportations, Samsun deportations, Amasya trials, Burning of Smyrna

Resistance and rescue
- Greek resistance during the Greek genocide, Seventh Battle of Dazli, Anton Pasha, Efkleidis Kourtidis, Habil Bey

Foreign aid and relief
- Relief Committee for Greeks of Asia Minor, American Committee for Relief in the Near East, Asa Jennings, Esther Pohl Lovejoy, Pope Benedict XV, Pope Pius XI, Tokei Maru

Responsible parties
- Young Turks or Committee of Union and Progress; Three Pashas: Talat, Enver, Djemal; Bahaeddin Şakir, Teskilati Mahsusa or Special Organization, Nureddin Pasha, Topal Osman, Mustafa Kemal Atatürk

See also
- Greco-Turkish War (1919–1922), Greeks in Turkey, Population Exchange, Greek refugees, Armenian genocide, Assyrian genocide, Diyarbekir genocide, Istanbul trials of 1919–1920, Malta Tribunals

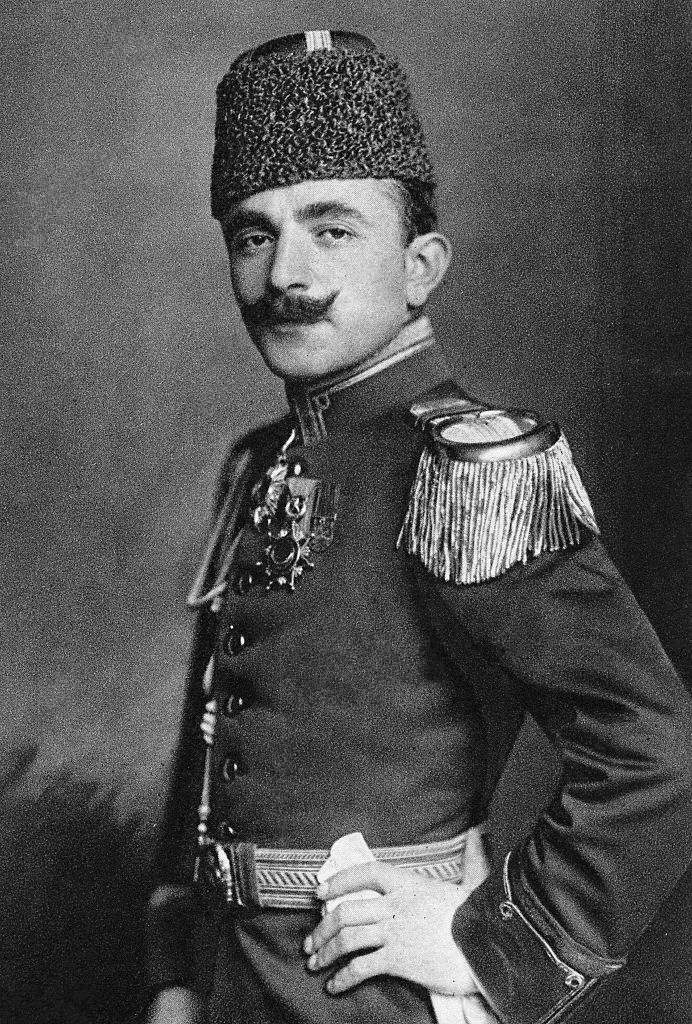
Enver Pasha, Turkish leader during the Ottoman genocides

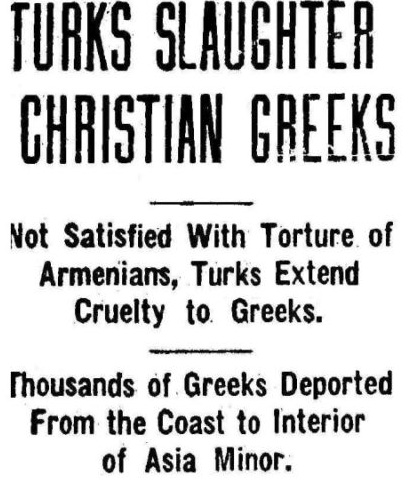
"Turks Slaughter Christian Greeks", Lincoln Daily Star, 19 October 1917

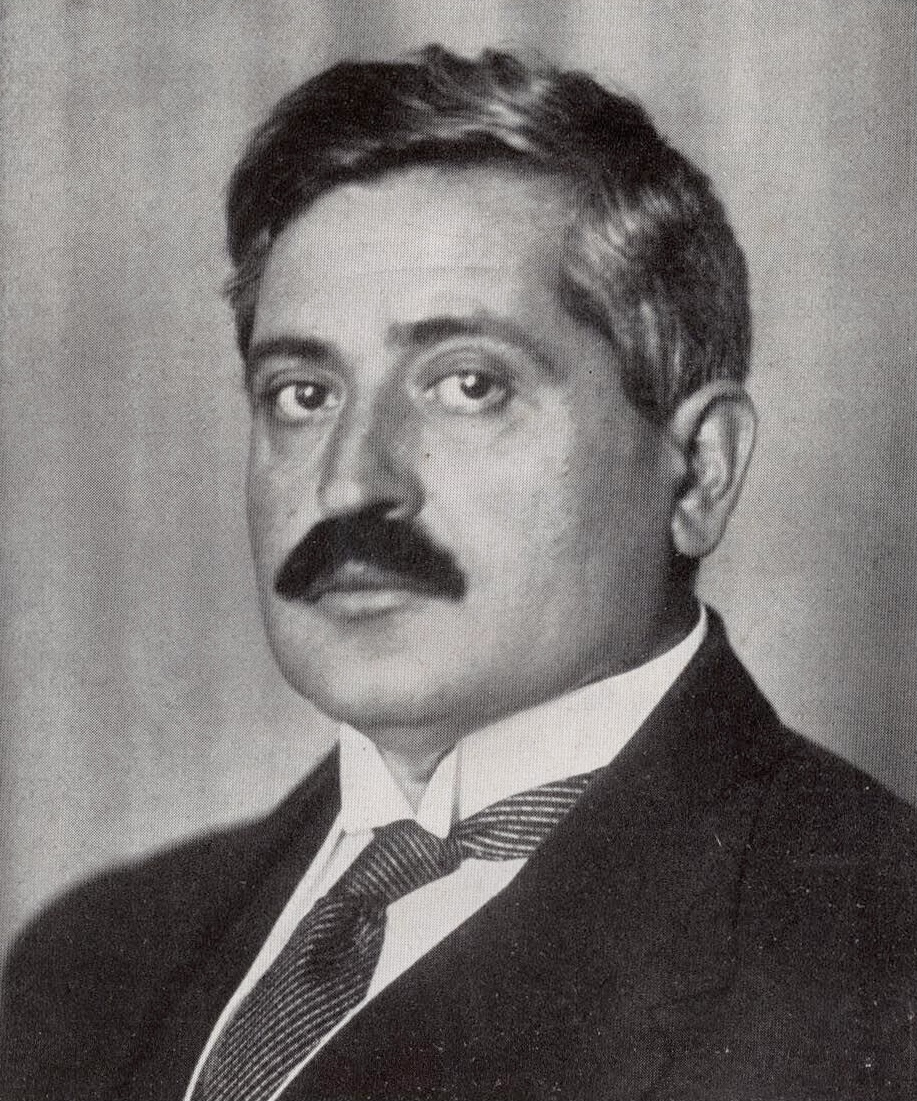
Talaat Pasha, Turkish leader during the Ottoman genocides.

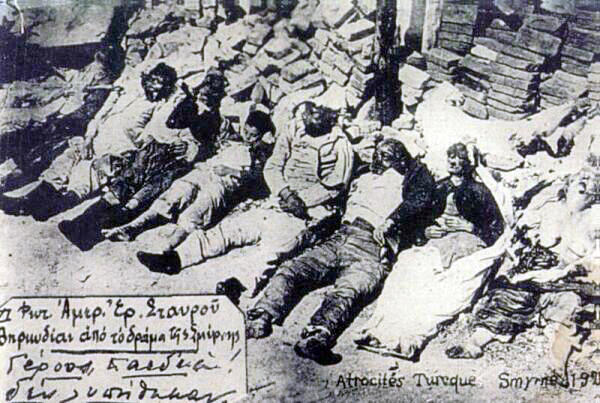
Photo whose text indicates it was taken by representatives of the Red Cross in Smyrna after the fire. Translation: "Elderly and children were not spared".

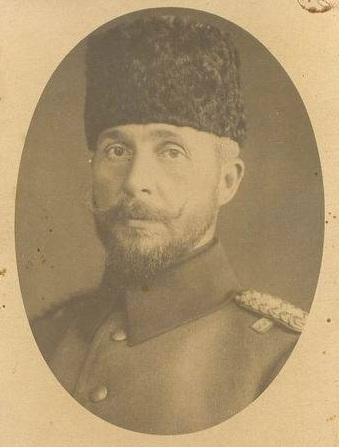
Nureddin Pasha, Turkish leader during the Ottoman genocides

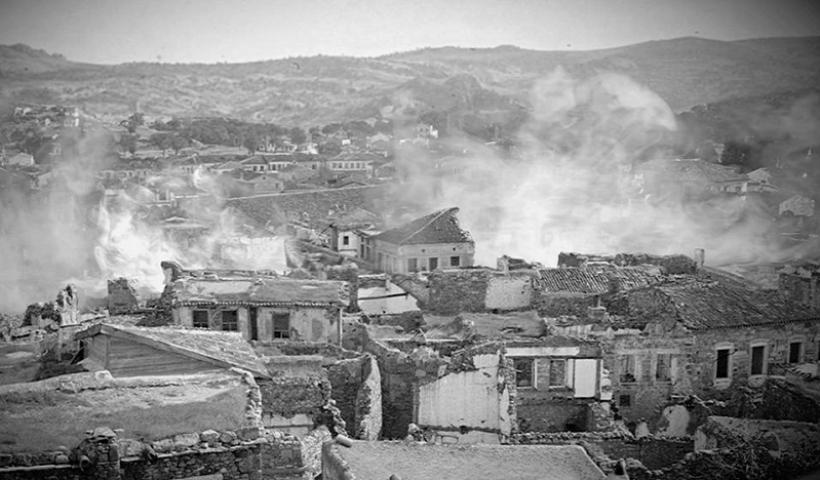
Phocaea in flames, during the Massacre of Phocaea

Mustafa Kemal Atatürk, Turkish leader during the Ottoman genocides.

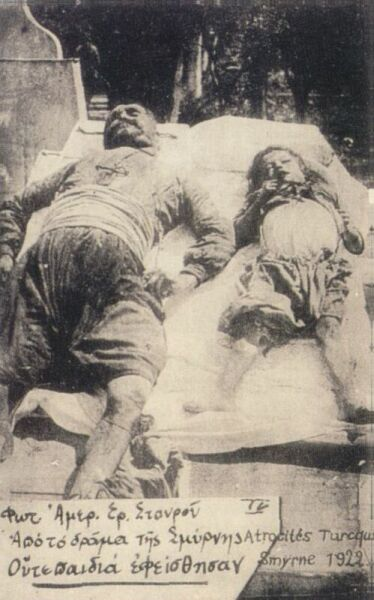
Smyrna, 1922. Translation: "No children were allowed to live".

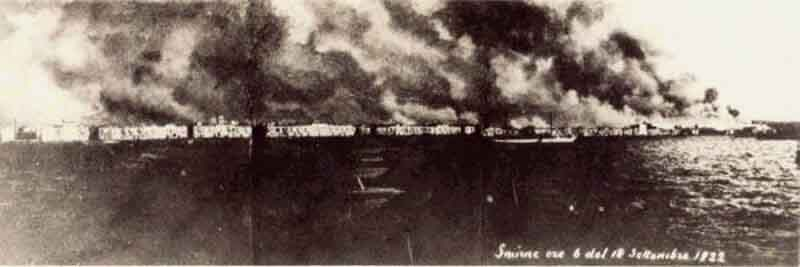
The Burning of Smyrna

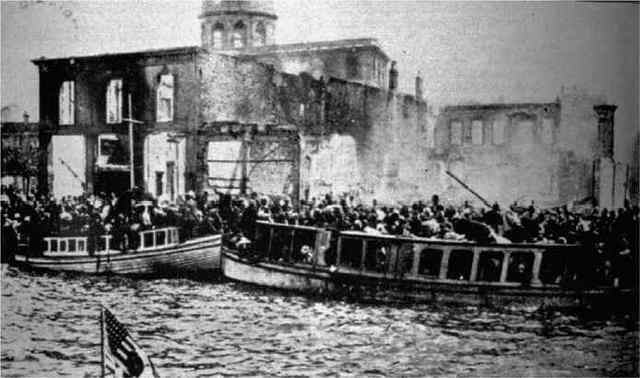
People fleeing the 1922 Smyrna fire try to reach Allied ships, in a photo taken from the launch boat of a US battleship.

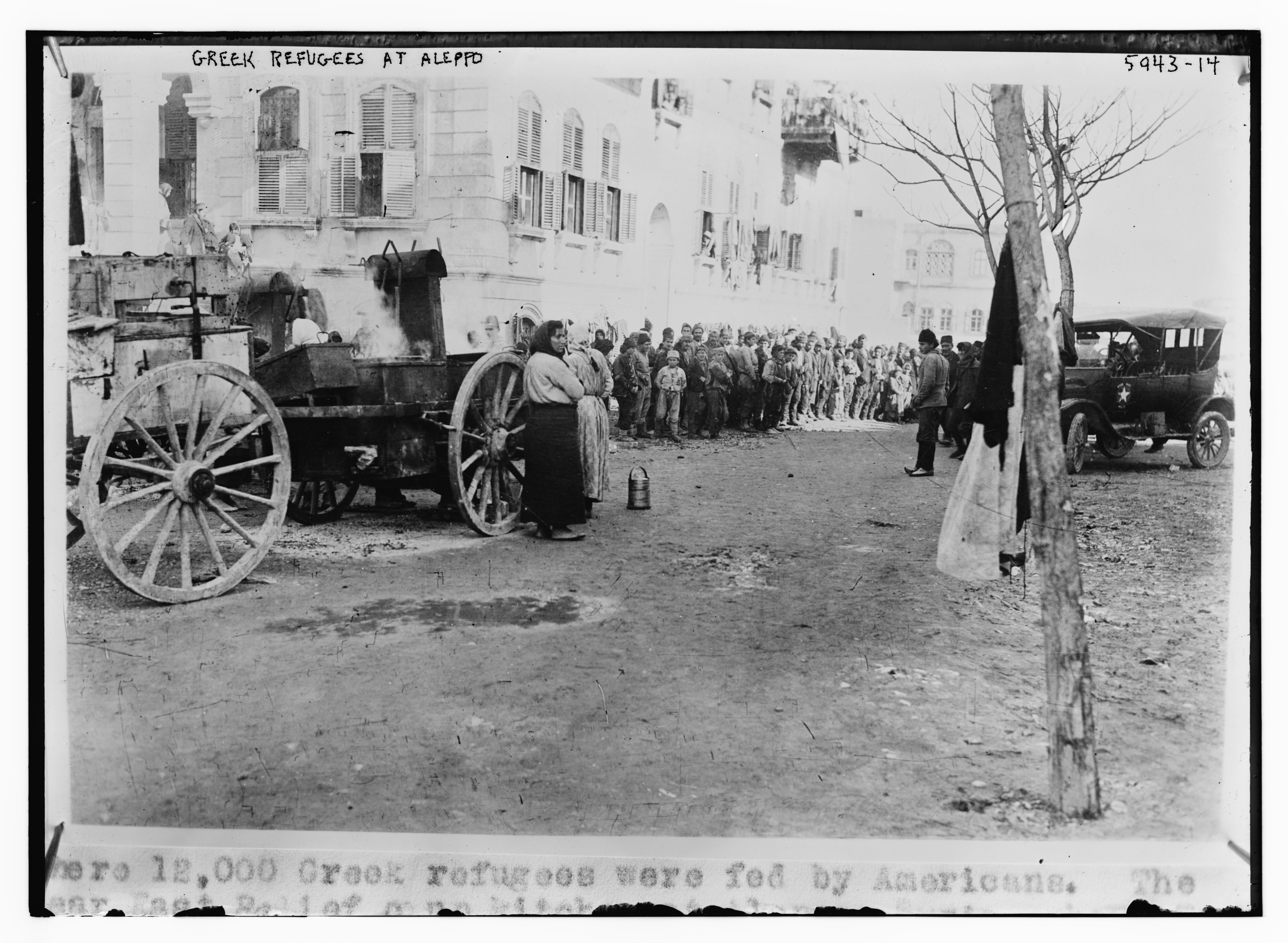
Greek refugees at Aleppo

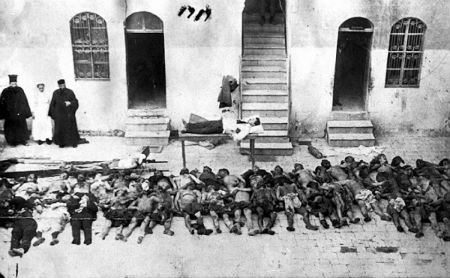
Pontic genocide victims

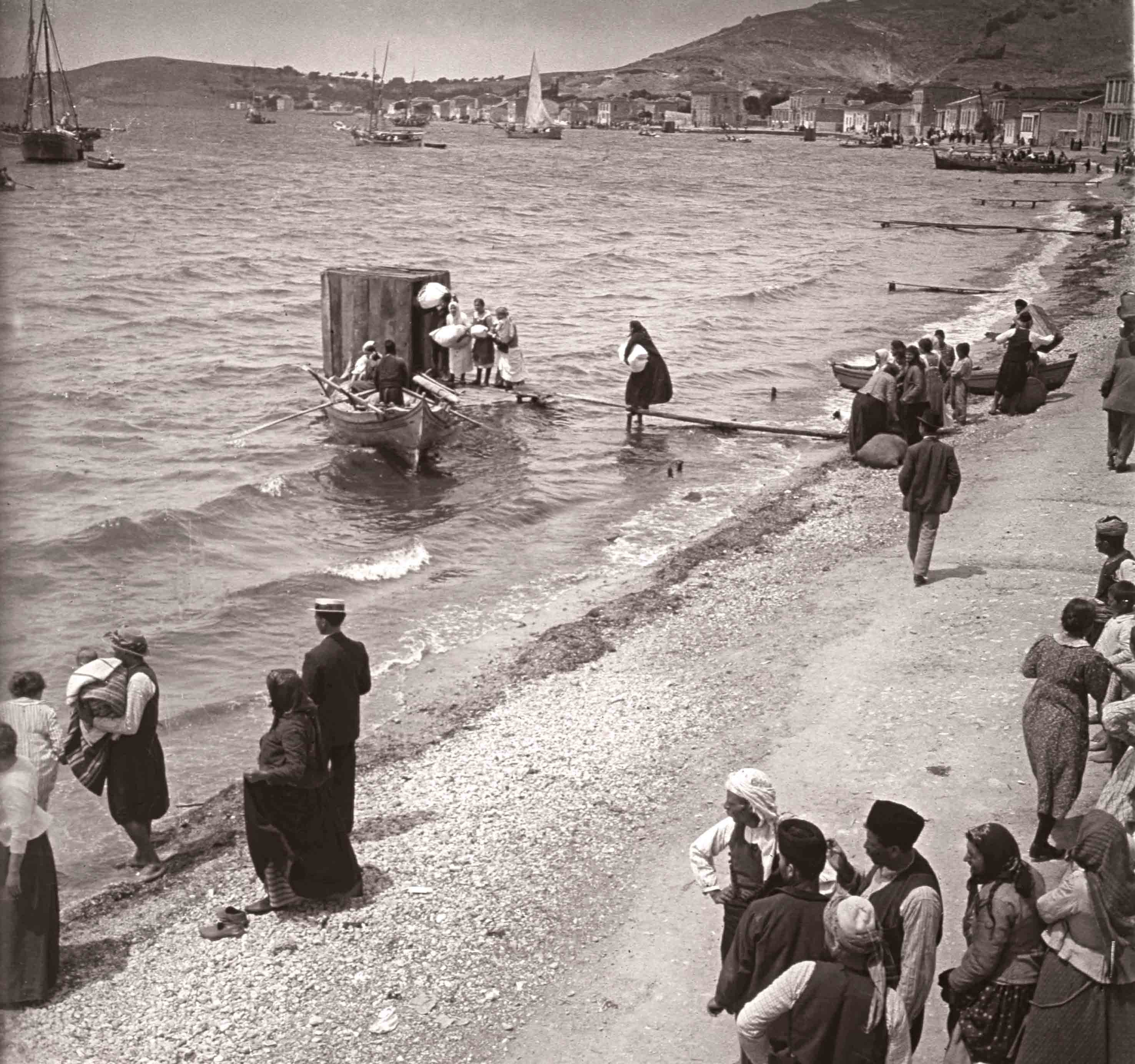
Ottoman Greek women forced to leave Foça, 13 June 1914

Below is an outline of Wikipedia articles related to the Greek genocide and closely associated events (Note: For example articles related to the Armenian genocide.) and explanatory articles. (Note: For example articles related to geography.) The topical outline is accompanied by a chronological outline of events. References are provided for background and overview.

The Greek Genocide was the mass killings and deportations of Greeks in the Ottoman Empire by Turkish forces. It resulted in the deaths of hundreds of thousands of Greeks, including the extermination of Pontian and Anatolian Greeks, the destruction of Smyrna, and widespread ethnic cleansing in Greek areas of Asia Minor.

The Greek and Armenian Genocides are considered part of the more extensive period of mass killings and ethnic cleansing of Christian populations in the Ottoman Empire at the beginning of the 20th century. Both genocides were carried out by the Ottoman government and Turkish nationalist forces and involved mass killings, forced deportations, and population transfers. The events have been recognized as a genocide by numerous countries but have not been officially recognized by the Turkish government.

== Overviews ==
- Greek genocide
- Greek resistance during the Greek genocide
- Late Ottoman genocides
- 1914 Greek deportations
- Occupation of Smyrna
- Turkish capture of Smyrna
- Population exchange between Greece and Turkey
- Prosecution of Ottoman war criminals after World War I
- Greco-Turkish War (1919–1922)

== Lists ==
- List of massacres during the Greco-Turkish War (1919–1922)
- Chronology of the Turkish War of Independence
- List of high-ranking commanders of the Turkish War of Independence

== Background ==
- Turkish people, Young Turk Revolution, Turkish War of Independence, Turkish nationalism
- Ottoman Greeks, Pontic Greeks, Greek refugees
- Eastern Orthodoxy
- World War I, Aftermath of World War I
- Armenian genocide, Ottoman Armenians
- Armistice of Mudros, Occupation of Constantinople
- Assyrian genocide, Assyrian Syriac Christians
- Great Famine of Mount Lebanon
- Late Ottoman genocides
- Partition of the Ottoman Empire, Abolition of the Ottoman sultanate, Dissolution of the Ottoman Empire, Abolition of the Caliphate

== Chronological outline of events ==
Below is a chronological outline of events related to the Greek genocide. This is intended to provide historical context for the articles about the Greek genocide. References are provided for background and overview information; for more references, see individual articles.

- 12–18 June 1914: The Massacre of Phocaea was a mass killing of the Greek population of the town of Phocaea (now Foça) in western Turkey, during the Greek Genocide. The massacre took place in June 1914, and was part of a larger pattern of violence and atrocities committed against the Greek population in Anatolia by Ottoman forces and Turkish nationalist groups before during and after World War I.

- 1 August 1914: The First World War begins.

- 29 October 1914 – 1 November 1914: The Ottoman Empire joined the war on the side of the Central Powers.

- 1915: The Ottoman government implements a policy of genocide against minority groups, including Greeks, Armenians, and Assyrians. Thousands of Greeks living in the Ottoman Empire are forcibly relocated and subjected to mass killings and atrocities.

- 17 February 1915 to 9 January 1916: The Allied forces invade the Gallipoli Peninsula; Turkish forces use this as an excuse for further violence against non-combatant Greek and Armenian civilians in the Ottoman Empire.

- 1916: The Samsun deportations were a series of forced migrations of the Greek population of the city of Samsun in northern Turkey, during the Greek Genocide. The deportations took place in 1916, as part of a larger campaign by the Ottoman government to deport and exterminate the Greek population in Anatolia.

- November 1918: The Armistice of 11 November 1918 ends the fighting of World War I and sets the stage for the Paris Peace Conference.

- 15 May 1919 – 11 October 1922: The Greco-Turkish War (1919–1922) begins, leading to the forced relocation and extermination of thousands of Greeks in Asia Minor.

- 15–16 May 1919: The Greek landing at Smyrna was the arrival of Greek forces in the city of Smyrna (Note: Smyrna is now the location of İzmir, Turkey) in May 1919, during the aftermath of World War I. The landing was part of a larger military intervention by the Allies, including Greece, aimed at protecting the significant Greek minority in the region and ensuring stability in the aftermath of the war. The intervention was controversial and led to conflict with the Turkish National Movement, which was fighting for independence and establishing a new Turkish state. The events in Smyrna and surrounding areas were contemporary with the outbreak of the Greco-Turkish War.

- May–June 1919: The İzmit massacres were a series of violent attacks that took place in the city of İzmit in northwestern Turkey during the Greek genocide. The massacres occurred in May and June 1919 and targeted the Greek community in the city, resulting in widespread violence and loss of life. An Inter-Allied Commission of Enquiry that investigated the incidents in the region generally accepted the claims by Greek authorities that 32 villages had been looted or burned, and that more than 12,000 local civilians had been massacred by Turkish forces, and 2,500 were missing.

- June 1919: The Treaty of Versailles is signed, officially ending the First World War and leading to the formation of the League of Nations.

- 1919-1920: The Istanbul trials of 1919–1920 were a series of military tribunals held in Istanbul (then Constantinople), Turkey, following the end of World War I. The trials were aimed at punishing Ottoman government officials and military leaders for their role in the mass extermination and forced migrations of the Armenian, Greek, and Assyrian populations in Anatolia during and after the war. The trials were organized by the Allies, who had defeated the Ottoman Empire in World War I. They were held in response to the widespread and systematic atrocities committed against minority communities in Anatolia, including the Armenian Genocide and the Greek Genocide.

- October 1919 – January 1920: The Amasya trials were a series of military tribunals held in the city of Amasya, Turkey, in the aftermath of World War I. The trials were held between October 1919 and January 1920, and aimed to prosecute Ottoman officials who were accused of committing war crimes and crimes against humanity during the war and its aftermath. The trials were held in response to widespread reports of violence and atrocities committed against ethnic and religious minorities, including Armenians, Greeks, and Assyrians, during the war and in the years following the collapse of the Ottoman Empire.

- 1920–1921: The Yalova Peninsula massacres were a series of massacres during 1920–1921, the majority of which occurred during March – May 1921. They were committed by local Greeks and Armenians with the invading Hellenic Army, against the Muslim population of the Armutlu Peninsula.

- May 1922: Evacuation of Ayvalik was a forced deportation of Greek residents from the town of Ayvalik in northwestern Turkey. The evacuation took place in May 1922, as part of a larger effort by the Ottoman government to expel the Greek population from Anatolia and erase their cultural heritage.

- 5–8 September 1922: The Fire of Manisa refers to the burning of the town of Manisa, Turkey, which started on the night of Tuesday, 5 September 1922 and continued until 8 September. The fire was started by the retreating Greek Army during the Greco-Turkish War, and as a result, 90 percent of the buildings in the town were destroyed.

- 9 September 1922: Turkish capture and occupation of Smyrna

- 13–22 September 1922: Burning of Smyrna. The city of Smyrna (now İzmir) in western Turkey was the site of one of the largest and most violent massacres of the Greek Genocide. The city, which had a predominantly Greek and Armenian population, was set ablaze by Turkish military forces after a week-long siege, resulting in widespread destruction and loss of life.

- 11 October 1922: (Note: Greece accepted the terms of the Armistice of Mudanya on October 13, 1922.) The Armistice of Mudanya effectively ends the Greco-Turkish War (1919–1922).

- 1 November 1922 : The Ottoman Empire is dissolved by the Grand National Assembly of Turkey and the modern Turkish state is established. Mustafa Kemal Atatürk becomes the first president of Turkey.

- July 1923: The Treaty of Lausanne between the successor powers in the Ottoman Empire and the Allies of World War I is signed on 24 July 1923 and ratified in Turkey on 23 August 1923. The Republic of Turkey was formally declared on 29 October 1923. The treaty defined the borders of the new Turkish state and settled various territorial and financial disputes between the Ottoman Empire and the Allies. The treaty effectively ended the Ottoman Empire and provided a path for the establishment of the modern nation-state of Turkey. One of the most significant provisions of the treaty was the compulsory population exchange between Greece and Turkey, which resulted in the forced relocation of over 1 million Greeks from Anatolia to Greece and over 400,000 Turks from Greece to Turkey. The population exchange was intended to resolve the ethnic tensions that had arisen during and after World War I, and to create homogeneous nation-states in Greece and Turkey. The Treaty of Lausanne was signed by representatives of the government of Turkey and the Allies (Great Britain, France, Italy, and Japan).

== Individuals ==
- List of high-ranking commanders of the Turkish War of Independence
- Ambrosios Pleianthidis
- Asa Jennings
- Çetes
- Chrysostomos of Smyrna
- Djemal Pasha
- Doctor Nazım
- Euthymios (Agritellis)
- Félix Sartiaux
- Gregory (Orologas)
- Ismail Enver
- Matthaios Kofidis
- Mustafa Kemal Atatürk
- Nikolaos Tsourouktsoglou
- Nikos Kapetanidis
- Nureddin Pasha
- Otto Liman von Sanders
- Prokopios Lazaridis
- Talaat Pasha
- Theobald von Bethmann Hollweg
- Topal Osman

== Entities ==
- Anatolia College in Merzifon
- Asia Minor Defense Organization
- Government of the Grand National Assembly
- Greek Caucasus Division
- Kuva-yi Milliye
- Labour Battalions (Turkey)
- Ottoman Empire
- Relief Committee for Greeks of Asia Minor
- Republic of Turkey
- Special Organization (Ottoman Empire)
- Three Pashas

== Locations ==
- Anatolia
- Cunda Island
- East Thrace
- Edremit, Balıkesir
- Foça
- Gallipoli
- İzmit
- Kayaköy
- Smyrna
- Syrian Desert
- Turkey
- Western Thrace
- Yenifoça

== Documents and agreements ==
- Convention Concerning the Exchange of Greek and Turkish Populations

== Works about ==
- Not Even My Name
- Number 31328
- On the Quai at Smyrna
- Pontos (film)
- The Thirty-Year Genocide
- 1922 (1978 film)
- Smyrna my Beloved

== See also ==
- Outline of genocide studies
- Constantinople pogroms
- Genocides in history (before World War I)
- List of genocides
- List of ethnic cleansing campaigns
- List of massacres in Turkey
- History of the Ottoman Empire
- Ottoman Empire in World War I
- Outline of the Ottoman Empire
- Timeline of the Ottoman Empire
- Herero and Namaqua genocide
- List of massacres in Cyprus
- Twice A Stranger: How Mass Expulsion Forged Modern Greece and Turkey
- Persecution of Eastern Orthodox Christians
- Greek Genocide Resource Center
