= Yenifoça =

- Settlement
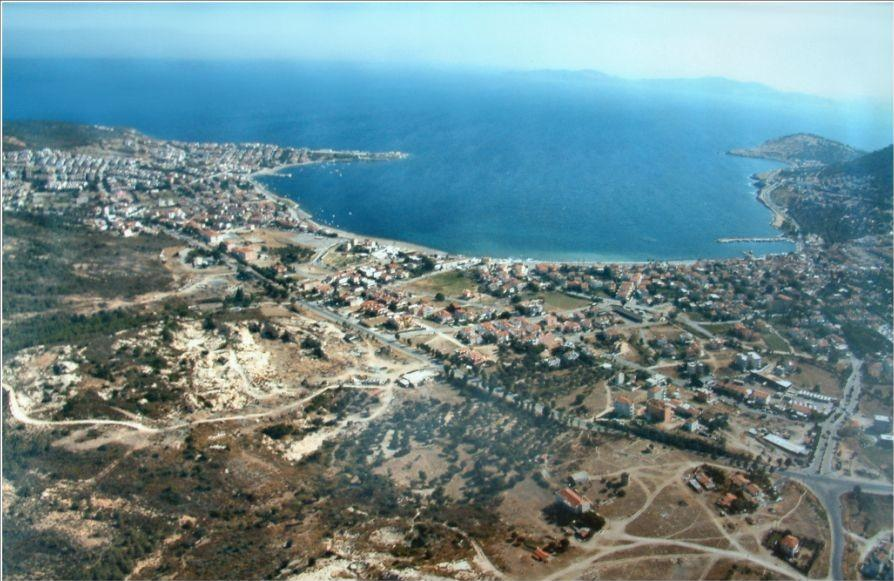
- General view of Yenifoça

- Location within Turkey
- Coordinates: 38°44′N 26°50′E
- Country: Turkey
- Region: Aegean
- Province: İzmir
- Elevation: 0 m (0 ft)

Population (2000)
  - Total: 3,742
- Time zone: UTC+3 (TRT)
- Area code: 0232

Yenifoça (meaning "New Foça" in Turkish, the words sometimes spelled separately as "Yeni Foça") is a former municipality of the Foça district, in Turkey's İzmir Province. It was merged into the municipality of Foça in 2008.

The town of Yenifoça is situated at about 80 km (50 mi) north by northwest of İzmir city center and a distance of 20 km (12 mi) from Foça proper. Since the names Yenifoça and that of the district center share the same roots, Foça itself is locally often called as Eskifoça ("the old Foça") in daily parlance.

Yenifoça is a small resort set around a harbor, with a large number of old houses in Ottoman or Greek styles filling its back streets. In recent years, the small town became very popular with those seeking second homes, especially from the province center of İzmir, and the estate agency business flourished considerably.

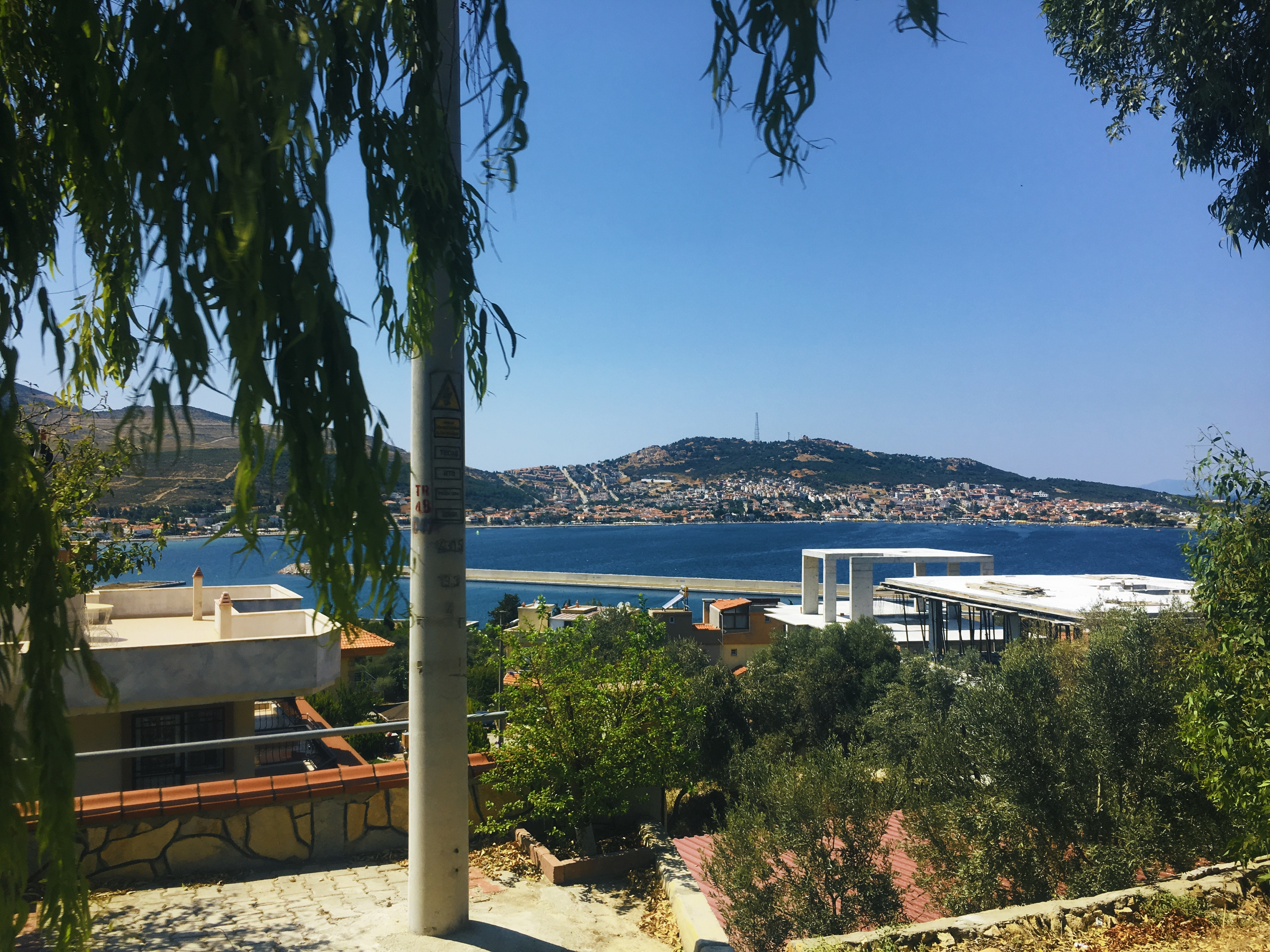
Harbor of Yenifoça viewed from the east

Yenifoça, taken over by the Genoese in 1275 and initially as a dowry, was the more active of the two Foças during the Middle Ages, due principally to the region's rich alum reserves, the Genoese lease over them having been preserved well into the Ottoman era. On 12 May 1649, at the height of the Cretan War (1645–1669), the harbor was the scene of a naval engagement in which the Ottoman and Venetian navies briefly checked each other.

In June 1914 Turkish forces attacked the Greek residents of the city resulting in the Massacre of Phocaea. During the massacre in YeniFoça, a local Muslim mother tried to defend the execution of her Greek neighbor by risking quarrel with chettes (Turkish irregular armed forces). People who belonged to the local networks were radically different in their perception of the Greeks compared to the muhacirs who were alien to the local networks. The local communities favored the Greeks. When the Greeks left, due to the attacks, their houses were occupied by muhacirs (forced Muslim migrants). When Félix Sartiaux, a French engineer and archaeologist who was working in the area together with his excavation team, visited New Phocaea a week after the Massacre of Phocaea, he found a scene similar to that in Phocaea: the town was deserted, looted, and in ruins. A few wounded individuals had been left behind in the streets, including a 99-year-old woman whom one of the archaeologists carried on his back. Some of the Greeks returned later (1919) to their houses, when the Greek army arrived at the city. The muhacirs that lived there ran away when the Greeks returned. When the Greek army defeated (1922), according to a testimony of a muhacir, the Greeks who tried to escape with boats or other things "were stopped and the punishments they deserved were delivered to them in and around the harbor of Eski Foça".

Many parts of the district are under strict environmental protection, due to the value of the flora and the fauna, especially along the road north from Foça to Yenifoça, winding past camping grounds, hotels and holiday villas, and offering dramatic sea views. Therefore, a judicious way to get to know the district would be by boat tours regularly organized with departure either from Foça or Yenifoça. Because of the protective measures, new constructions are not permitted in many parts of the district and Foça is set to preserve its unique characteristic as composed principally of old houses.

== See also ==
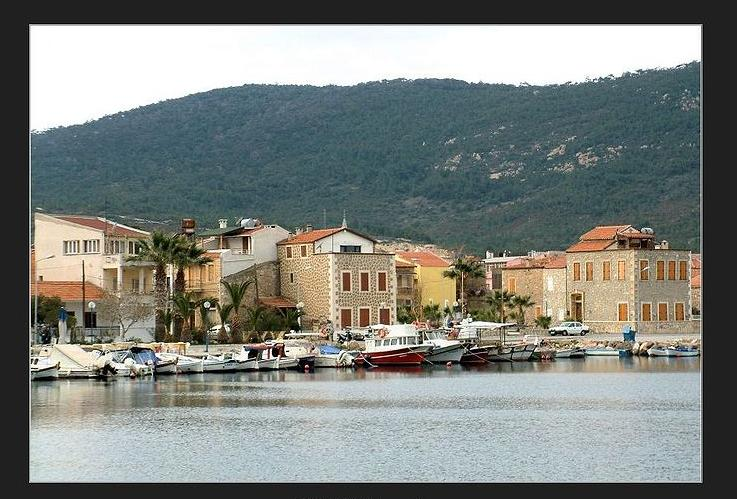
Yenifoça quay

- Foreign purchases of real estate in Turkey
- Foça
- Marinas in Turkey
