= Not Even My Name =

Narrative nonfiction book about the Greek genocide

- Author: Thea Halo
- Language: English
- Subject: Genocide; Immigration to the USA
- Publisher: Macmillan Publishers (Picador)
- Publication date: 2000
- Publication place: USA
- Media type: Print
- Pages: 328
- ISBN: 9780312277017
- Website: Not Even My Name

Not Even My Name is the biography of Sano Halo, who survived the Greek genocide and moved to the United States of America. The book was written by Sano Halo's daughter, Thea Halo, and first published in 2000 by Picador, an imprint of Macmillan Publishers. The biography focuses on Sano Halo's experience during and immediately after the genocide. Not Even My Name was originally published in English in the US, but it has been translated into Dutch, Icelandic, and Greek.

== Summary ==
The book is divided into three main sections. These sections are interspersed with Thea Halo's poetry and some historical background.

=== Book One: The Long Journey Home ===
In the first chapter, Thea Halo writes a bit about her own childhood. She grew up in New York City, a child of immigrant parents. She and her nine siblings knew little of their heritage growing up. Both her parents, Sano and Abraham, had come from West Asia. Her mother was Pontian and her father Assyrian.

The rest of Book One covers Thea and Sano's journey to Turkey in 1989. Both had wanted to find Sano's hometown: Iondone, a cluster of three small settlements near Fatsa. They traveled through Ankara, Amasya, and Fatsa on their way to Iondone. (Note: Phonetic spelling; the name for the town was Agios Antonios, or Saint Anthony.) Thea and Sano had mixed feelings about their trip to Turkey. Both were apprehensive about what they might find.

=== Book Two: Not Even My Name ===
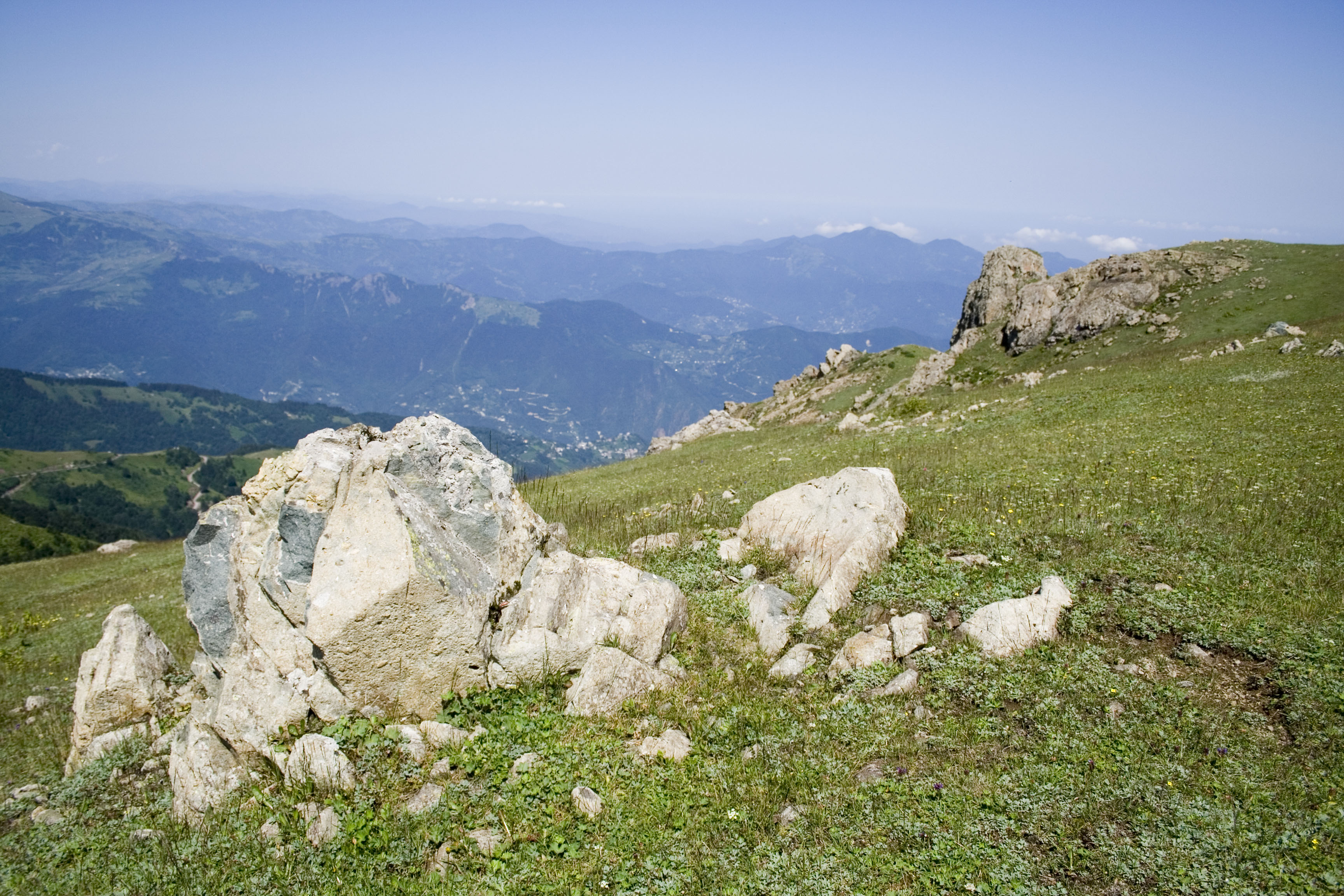
Pontic mountains in Trabzon Province

In chapters 7 through 17, Thea details her mother's life in Iondone. These chapters are written in first-person from Sano Halo's perspective. Sano had grown up as Themía in a mountain village. Her village was inland, located in the Pontic Alps, near the coastal settlements of Fatsa and Ordu. Her father and grandfather were blacksmiths, while the women were homemakers. She recalls that, during World War I, Turkish soldiers sometimes came to the villages to draft young Pontian men. These men were sent away to the amele taburları, or labor battalions. (Note: The amele taburları were labor camps. The workers were usually Christian men.) Most didn't return.

However, Themía also remembers happy summers spent with her family high up in the forested mountains. She lived in a log house with her parents, grandfather, aunts, and uncles. Her family had a farm and animals, and Themía had her own calf named Mata. She recalls playing with her siblings, picking wildflowers, and taking neighbors' cattle out to pasture. She and her sister went to school and knew how to read. Her village, one of Greek-speaking Christians, coexisted more or less peacefully with the nearby Turkish villages.

When Themía was nine years old, rumors began to spread around her village: Pontians were being massacred along the coast. Around the same time, Themía noticed strange men hiding in the fields and woods around her village. She later learned that they were Kurds. Themía's fellow villagers began to worry for their safety, and hoped that the Andartes (Note: Pontian guerrillas) would protect them.

A short while after World War I had ended, Turkish soldiers came to Themía's village. One winter day, they rounded up all men of working age, including Themía's father, Lumbo. A neighbor told Themía's mother that the men had been taken to labor camps. Themía's father escaped the labor camps and returned to his family. He managed to hide with his family and avoid recapture.

In the spring of 1920, soldiers took Themía's grandfather from his workplace. His family never saw him again. Turkish soldiers rounded up many men from her village that season. During spring planting, soldiers came to Themía's family home and forced the family to the village square at gunpoint. Many families crowded into the square. A Turkish officer announced that the villagers would have three days to pack what they could carry. After that, soldiers would force them to leave. Themía's mother gathered food and clothes. Her father, Lumbo, buried the family's pots and pans so they wouldn't be stolen.

On the dawn of the fourth day, Turkish soldiers forced the people of Iondone to leave on foot.

=== Book Three: The Exile ===
Themía and her family passed through the neighboring Turkish town on their way south. One man told the family that Themía's grandfather had died in the camps. Soldiers pushed away the Turks who tried to talk to or walk with their Christian neighbors.

None of the exiles knew their destination. Soldiers forced them to sleep on the ground even when they were within walking distance of a village. Often, they prohibited the exiles from buying food. Themía's mother, Barthena, (Note: Likely Parthena; Thea Halo wrote many foreign-language names and songs phonetically.) was once whipped by a Turkish soldier for requesting water. Every morning, the march began with the Fajr prayer, and every night, the exiles were allowed to stop for the Isha prayer. Otherwise, the exiles could only stop walking when the soldiers allowed.

Themía's shoes wore through after four months of walking. She recalls at least one death per day of the march. The soldiers prohibited the exiles from burying their dead; young and old alike were left to rot on the side of the road. Themía's little sister, Maria, died on the roads, and soldiers forced the family to abandon her. Buzzards followed the exiles. Themía recalls seeing villagers she knew among the dead.

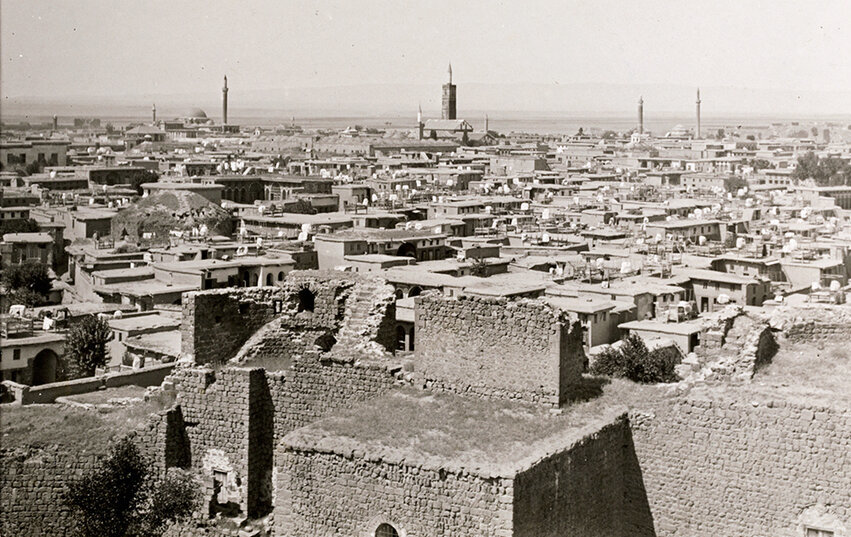
Diyarbakır, around 1900

When the exiles arrived in Diyarbakır after seven months of walking, French relief workers gave them bread. Themía's family stopped in a small town outside Diyarbakır. In that town, Themía's sister, Nastasía, died of illness while lying across Themía's chest.

One day, Themía's parents woke up their remaining children very early, before the dawn. They escaped, leaving the other exiles. They went to a small, abandoned town called Karabahçe. (Note: This was a town in Diyarbakır Province, not to be confused with Karabahçe, Bigadiç.) Other people from their village had taken shelter in the empty buildings there. The family dug up roots for food and stole wheat from the edges of fields. When there was nothing left to eat, Themía and Barthena begged in the nearby villages. In one village, Tlaraz, Barthena gave Themía away to a stranger who promised to take care of her.

The stranger was an Arabic-speaking Assyrian woman named Ruth. Because she could not pronounce "Themía," she gave the girl a new name: Sano. From then on, Sano was expected to run errands for the family: she fetched water, looked after the children, and helped with cooking. She learned to speak Arabic and Kurdish to communicate with the other villagers.

One day, Sano's father came: he told her that her sister, Mathea, had died after a long sickness. The Assyrian family hired him to work at their home, but he came rarely, and his visits eventually stopped. When Sano's father did return, he told her that Barthena had also died. By that point, when Sano tried to cry for her lost family, no tears would come.

Ruth treated Sano cruelly; she stole her things, regularly insulted her, and lied to her. Sano's brother Yanni came to the house and informed Sano that her last remaining sister, Cristodula, had died. Ruth quickly sent Yanni away. Sano continued to work for Ruth's family. Ruth stole things from Sano, including a pair of shoes and a lahore (Note: A type of belt made of striped, colorful wool, which Pontian women traditionally wore.) that Sano's mother had made for her.

One day, Sano ran away from Ruth, but went back to her house. After that, Ruth became more violent, beating Sano when she did chores incorrectly and threatening to kill her. Sano ran away a second time and walked to Diyarbakır. She was looking for a kind woman who'd once visited Ruth's house. When Sano reached the city, strangers gave her food, and she found the woman she was looking for. The woman gave her a place to sleep for a few days. Soon, another woman named Zohra took Sano in.

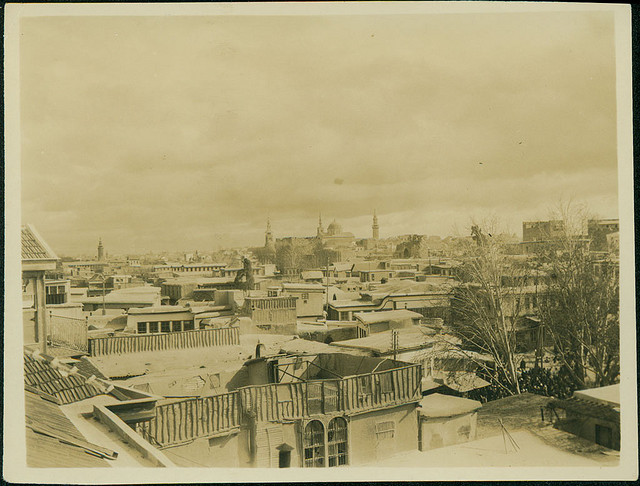
Aleppo skyline in 1919.

Zohra and her family were Armenian, so Sano also learned Armenian. Sano helped Zohra take care of the house, the children, and older relatives. When Mustafa Kemal took power and Zohra's family fled to Syria, Sano went with them. They bought an apartment in Aleppo.

When Sano was 15, Zohra had her marry an Assyrian from Merdin named Abraham. He lived in the US and wanted a wife who could live there with him. He was thirty years her senior, but he was wealthy, and he paid the equivalent of US$100 for Sano's dowry. Abraham consummated their marriage soon after the wedding. Sano was confused and afraid; she didn't yet menstruate, and she didn't understand what sex was. Abraham was gruff with Sano, sometimes hitting her, during the early years of their marriage. However, Abraham's relatives were kind to Sano. They had survived the Assyrian genocide and sympathized with Sano's experience.

Sano and Abraham lived in Aleppo for a few months while Abraham tried to find them both passage to America. Finally, they went to Beirut and took a ship to New York City. While on board, Sano taught herself to crochet.

=== Book Four: America, America ===
In August 1925, Sano and Abraham arrived on Ellis Island in the USA. Sano moved into a New York City boardinghouse with Abraham. She had to take care of Farage, his son from a previous marriage, who was only five years her junior. Sano picked up English so she could speak to him and other Americans. She worked as a homemaker, doing housework while her husband did odd jobs and her stepson went to school.

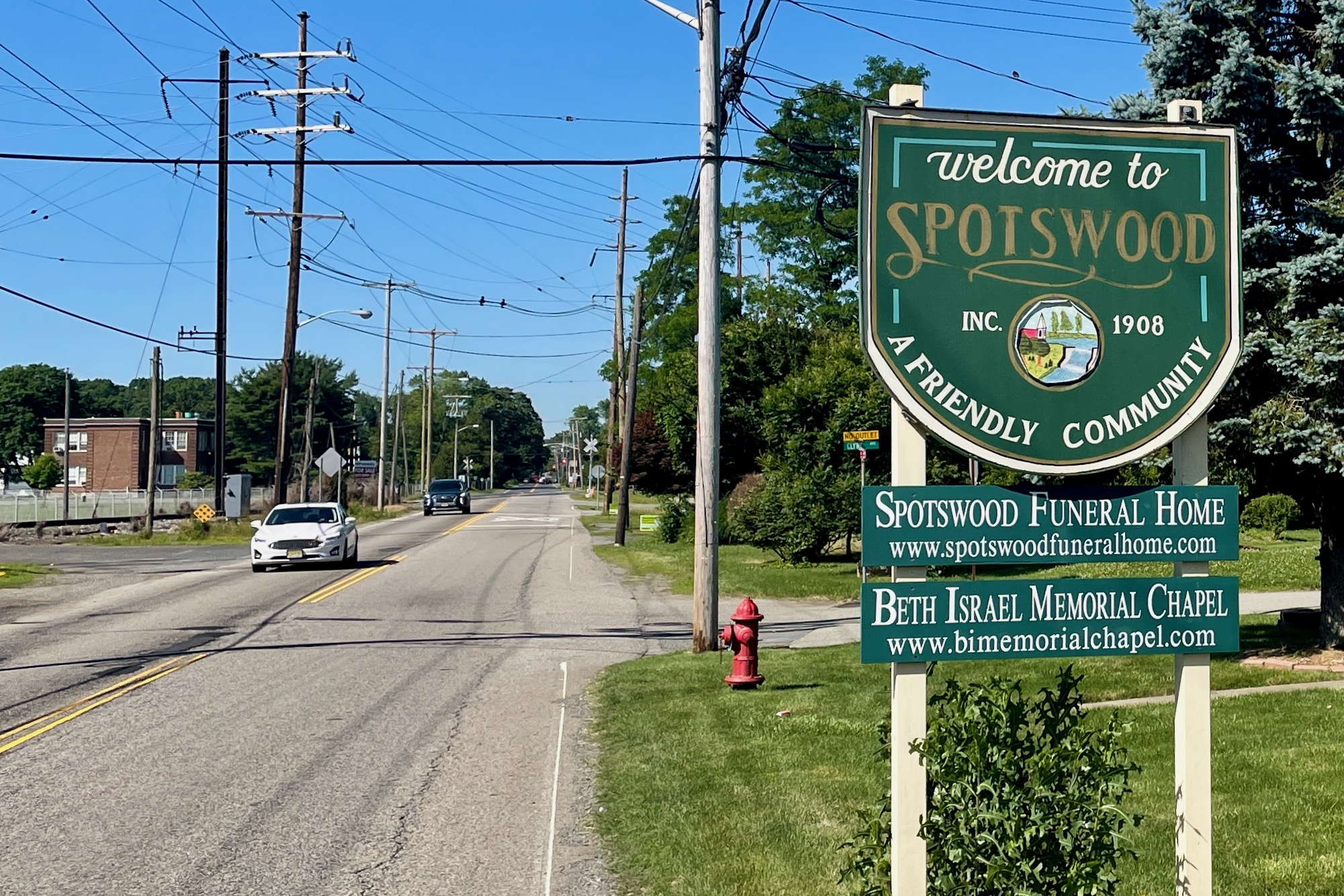
Crossing into Spotswood, NJ

Sano didn't get her first period until she was around 16, and she became pregnant with her first child soon after. She gave birth to Mariam, Helyn, Harton, Nejmy, and Amos in New York.

During the Great Depression, Sano taught herself to sew. She also improved her crocheting skills so she could clothe the children. Most of what she knew, including cooking and housework, she learned from watching others.

The family moved around a lot because money was scarce. In the 1930s, the family bought a plot of land in Spotswood, New Jersey. Abraham built a house, and as the years went by, the children helped him with renovations. Abraham planted vegetables and fruit trees in the yard. Sano gave birth to David, Timothy, Thea, Adrian, and Jonathan in those years. Sano worked at different factory jobs to support the family as Abraham aged.

The children grew up and had children of their own. Sano and Abraham entertained them at the New Jersey house regularly. Abraham died at age 94. Once he was dead, the town bought their land for development.

=== Book Five: Journey's End ===
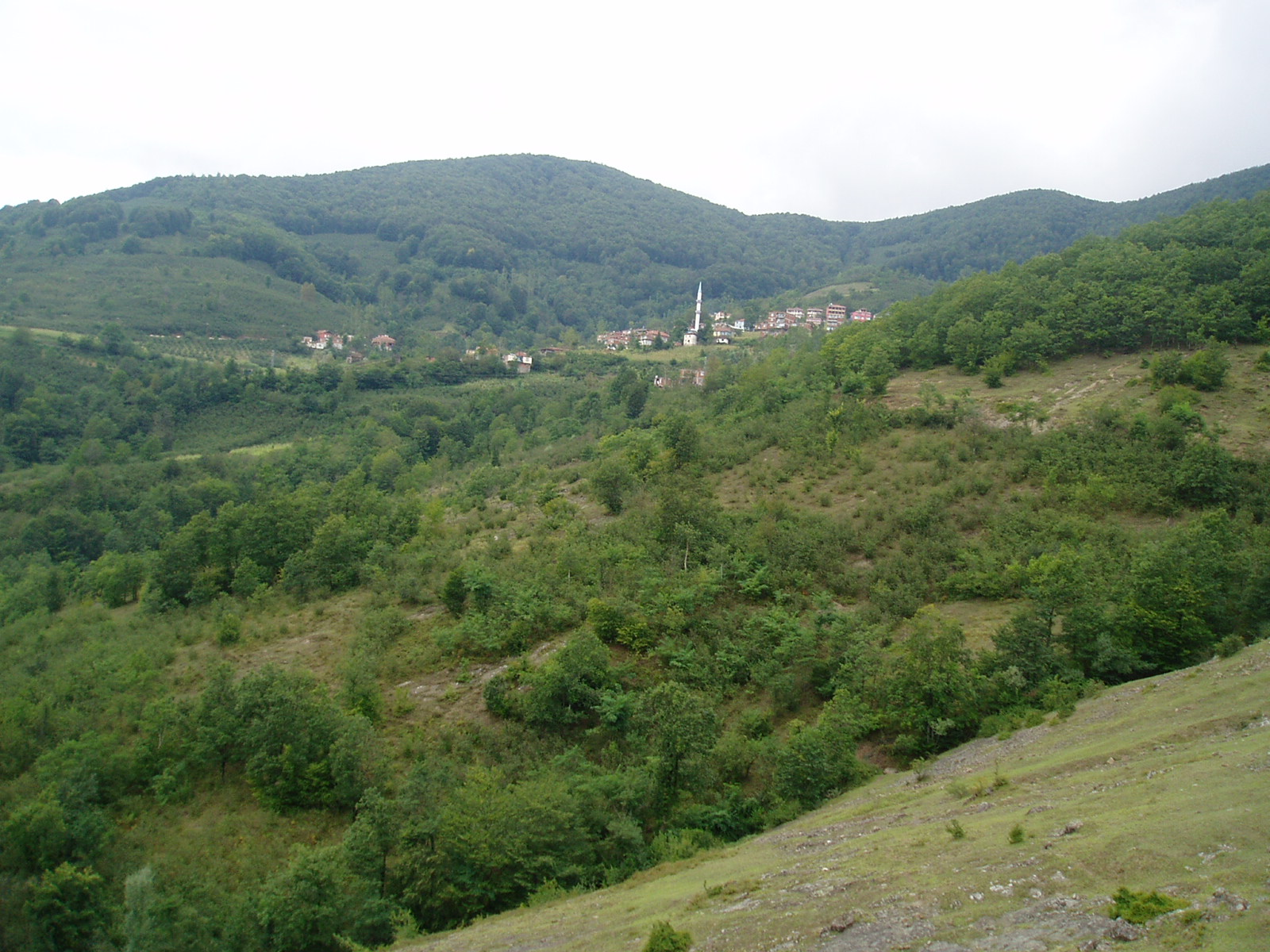
Koyunculu in Aybastı District, near Sano's home village

In this portion of the book, Sano's life story returns to the present. Thea Halo details their trip to Turkey as she did in the first few chapters.

Sano and Thea Halo had been staying in a hotel in Aybastı. From there, they took a dolmuş to the site of Sano's hometown. On the way, they met an elderly Turkish man who remembered Sano's family, and had been fifteen at the time of the deportation.

The man showed them a set of hills near his house, explaining that Iondone had been there. Sano became distraught; she wanted to know where the buildings had gone. The man introduced them to a woman living in a small house near the site of Iondone.

The woman was younger, but she said she'd lived in Sano's house. She showed them a pile of stones where Sano's childhood home had been. The woman explained that people from neighboring villages had torn down the houses, looking for gold or any valuables the deportees had left behind. Thea and Sano both gained some sense of closure: that everything was gone, but they were not.

== Reception ==
Not Even My Name sold well in Astoria, Queens, which hosts a large Pontic Greek population. Sano Halo was invited to speak about her experiences at Astoria's Stathakion Cultural Center in 2000.

Publishers Weekly reviewed the book, calling it "eloquent and powerful." Peter Balakian, an American writer and translator, said, "Thea Halo has written an important book about a largely unknown history."

During WWI, thousands of Armenians and Anatolian Greeks fled Turkey, landing in northern Syria. The Red Cross fed these refugees; many were homeless and poor, forced to shelter in caves. Sano Halo traveled through Syria with these thousands of others. Before the publication of her story, it wasn't well known that Pontians sought asylum in Syria.

The book has also received criticism. Michael Doran, writing for the Washington Post, praised the narrative aspect of the story. However, he disapproved of Thea Halo's approach to Turkish history, writing: "Her purpose is to reinforce a particular perspective on modern history, a view that comes close to regarding the entire Turkish people as innately hostile to minorities." Erik Sjöberg, in his book The Making of the Greek Genocide, questioned Thea Halo's narrative writing. He thought she embellished some parts of the narrative: the bucolic Pontian village, the detailed discussions among adults. Sjöberg also noted Thea Halo's bias when writing historical background information. He did believe that the narrative Sano Halo told her daughter was truthful. However, there are gaps. Sano Halo herself admitted (as quoted by Sjöberg) that she'd blocked parts of the deportation from her memory; her full story remains unknown.

Pontian organizations and Greek-diaspora news sources nicknamed Sano Halo "Grandmother of the Pontian Greeks." Sano Halo became a public figure after Macmillan released Not Even My Name, and multiple news sources reported on her death in 2014. Sano and Thea received honorary Greek citizenship after the book's publication.

== See also ==
- Greek genocide
- Pontic Greeks
- Dissolution of the Ottoman Empire
- Turkish War of Independence
- On the Quai at Smyrna
- Number 31328
