= Convention Concerning the Exchange of Greek and Turkish Populations =

1923 agreement between Greece and Turkey

The Convention Concerning the Exchange of Greek and Turkish Populations (Greek: Σύμβαση για την Ανταλλαγή των ελληνικών και τουρκικών Πληθυσμών, romanized: Symvasi gia eis Antallagi ton ellinikon kai tourkikon Plithysmon, Turkish: Türk ve Yunan Nüfuslarının Mübadelesine İlişkin Sözleşme), also known as the Lausanne Convention, was an agreement between the Greek and Turkish governments signed by their representatives in Lausanne on 30 January 1923, in the aftermath of the Greco-Turkish War of 1919–1922. The agreement provided for the simultaneous expulsion of Orthodox Christians from Turkey to Greece and of Muslims from Greece (particularly from the north of the country) to Turkey. These involuntary population transfers involved approximately 1.6 million people, around 1.2 million Anatolian Greeks and 400,000 Muslims.

== Population exchanges ==
With respect to the Muslims of Greece the treaty reflected Ottoman conceptions of 'nationality' in that their actual ethnic origins was superseded by religious affiliation. That meant that many Greek Muslims from Greek Macedonia and Epirus were classified as Turks and so were forced to leave their homes, despite the fact that many spoke little or no Turkish and actually descended from Ottoman-era Greek converts to Islam.

Also many historic cases of Pontic Greeks from northeastern Anatolia and the Trans-Caucasus region who had converted to Islam and adopted the Turkish-language and national identity were simply classified for the purposes of the convention as 'Turks'. However, large numbers from that Pontic Greek community had remained Crypto-Christians into the late Ottoman period, before reverting to their ancestral Christian Orthodox faith following the 1828 Russian occupation of Erzurum and Gümüşhane, when they joined the invading forces and then followed the Russian Imperial Army back into Georgia and southern Russia upon its withdrawal.

The convention was ratified by the Turkish government on 23 August 1923 and by the Greek government on 25 August 1923, after the conclusion of the Treaty of Lausanne. It was registered in the League of Nations Treaty Series on 27 January 1925.

== Terms ==
- Article 1 provided for a compulsory removal of Greek Orthodox persons from Turkey to Greece and Muslims from Greece to Turkey, to begin on 1 May 1923.
- Article 2 exempted from removal the Greeks of the city of Constantinople as well as the Muslims of Western Thrace.
- Article 3 stipulated that those Muslims who already left Greece and Greek Orthodox who already left Turkey shall be considered as having moved as part of the population exchange.
- Article 4 stipulated the exchange shall start with able-bodied Greek men located in Turkey.
- Article 5 guaranteed the rights of property of all persons removed under the agreement.
- Article 6 stipulated that persons eligible for removal who were under arrest or in prison for various crimes, shall be removed notwithstanding, and shall serve their sentences in their new country.
- Article 7 provided for granting each person removed the nationality of his new country.
- Article 8 provided for the removal of property along with its owners.
- Article 9 stipulated for the establishment of a mixed commission to dispose of immovable property left behind by persons removed.
- Articles 10-17 regulated the work of the commission.
- Article 18 obliged the Greek and Turkish governments to make all the necessary changes in internal legislation to conform to the agreement.
- Article 19 stipulated that the agreement shall enter into effect on the same day as the planned peace treaty to be signed with the Turkish government.

== See also ==
- Outline and timeline of the Greek genocide
- Christianity in Turkey
- Islam in Greece
- Greeks in Turkey
