= Foça Castle =

Castle in Turkey

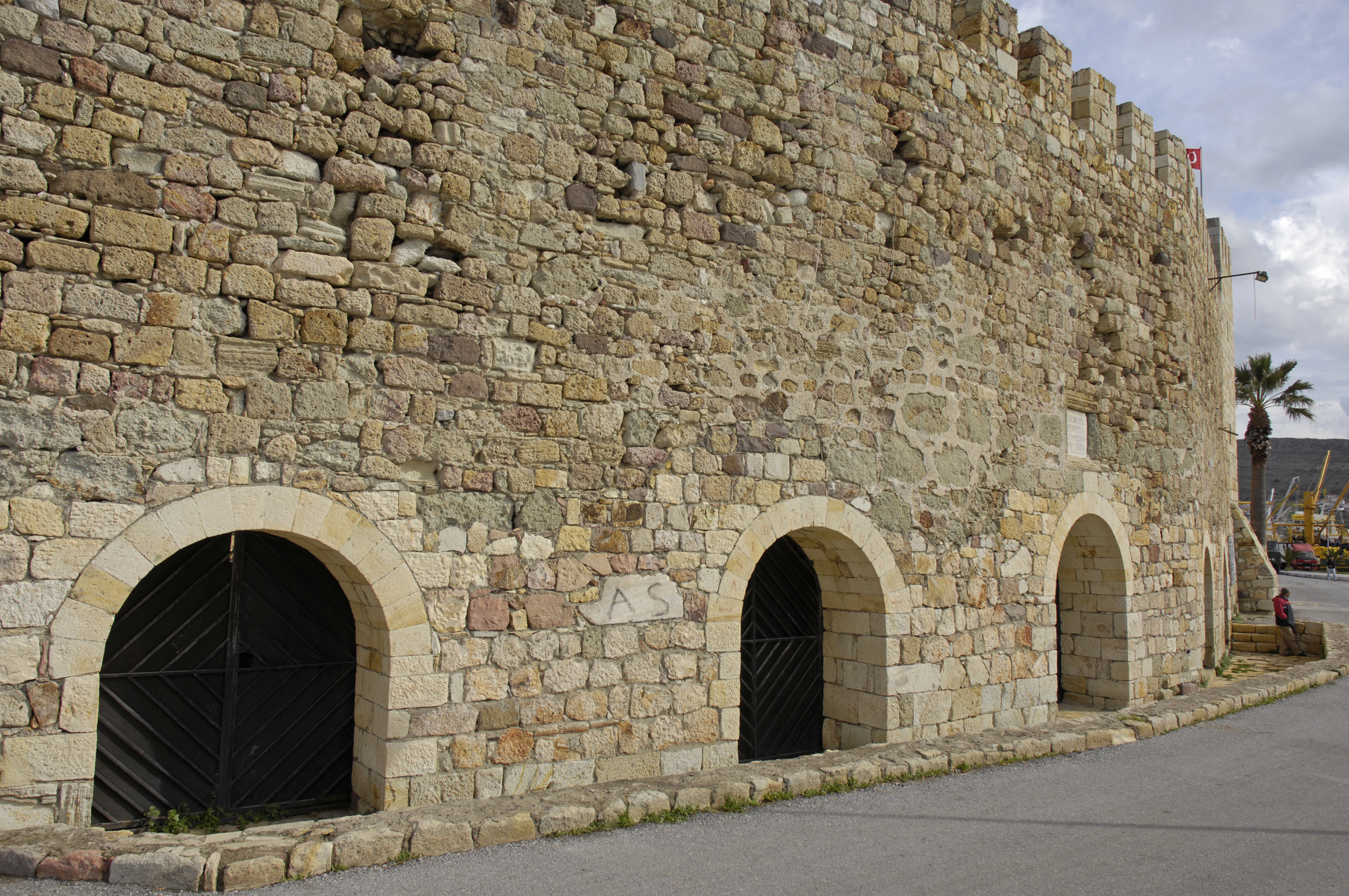

Foça Castle (Turkish: Foça Kalesi), also known as Beşkapılar Castle (Turkish: Beşkapılar Kalesi), is a coastal fortification in İzmir Province, western Turkey.

The castle is located in Foça ilçe (district) of İzmir Province at 38°40′08″N 26°45′03″E. Its distance to İzmir is about 55 kilometres (34 mi).

The fortification wall around the ancient city of Phocaea was built in 590-580 BC. The walls underwent restoration during the Byzantine Empire era. The castle was a part of the Republic of Genoa in the 13th century, and it was rebuilt by the Genovese. In the 14th century, Ottoman prince Şehzade Halil was kidnapped and retained in the castle. The fortification was restored in 1538 by Ottomans after the city was annexed.

The castle stretches over the peninsula. Athena temple marks the northernmost end and the five gates collectively known as Beşkapılar (“Five Gates”) mark the southwestern end. Beşkapılar was used as a boatshed (Turkish: Kayıkhane) during the Ottoman Empire.

In 2020, Foça Castle was included in the list of World Heritage Sites in Turkey (Tentative list).
