= Massacre of Phocaea =

1914 killing of Greeks in the Ottoman Empire

- Part of the Greek genocide
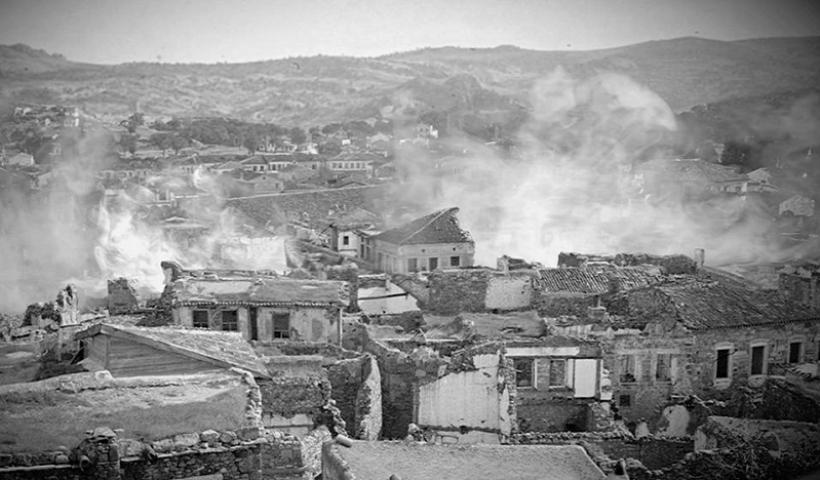
- Old Phocaea in flames, during the massacre perpetrated by Turkish irregulars
- Location: 38°40′N 26°46′E; Phocaea/Eskifoça and Yeni Foça, Ottoman Empire
- Date: 12–18 June 1914
- Target: Greek population
- Attack type: Ethnic cleansing, genocidal massacre, mass murder
- Deaths: c. 50, 100 or 200 killed; c. 6,200 fled (entire town); The county population decreased from 23,000 to 4,000
- Perpetrators: Turkish irregulars; Ottoman army; Ottoman police; Ordered by the Young Turk government
- Motive: Anti-Greek sentiment and Turkification

Greek genocide

Background
- Young Turk Revolution, Ottoman Greeks, Pontic Greeks, Ottoman Empire

The genocide
- Labour battalions, Death march, Pontic Greek genocide, Phocaea massacre, Evacuation of Ayvalik, İzmit massacres, 1914 Greek deportations, Samsun deportations, Amasya trials, Burning of Smyrna

Resistance and rescue
- Greek resistance during the Greek genocide, Seventh Battle of Dazli, Anton Pasha, Efkleidis Kourtidis, Habil Bey

Foreign aid and relief
- Relief Committee for Greeks of Asia Minor, American Committee for Relief in the Near East, Asa Jennings, Esther Pohl Lovejoy, Pope Benedict XV, Pope Pius XI, Tokei Maru

Responsible parties
- Young Turks or Committee of Union and Progress; Three Pashas: Talat, Enver, Djemal; Bahaeddin Şakir, Teskilati Mahsusa or Special Organization, Nureddin Pasha, Topal Osman, Mustafa Kemal Atatürk

See also
- Greco-Turkish War (1919–1922), Greeks in Turkey, Population Exchange, Greek refugees, Armenian genocide, Assyrian genocide, Diyarbekir genocide, Istanbul trials of 1919–1920, Malta Tribunals

The massacre of Phocaea (Greek: Η Σφαγή της Φώκαιας, romanized: I Sfagí tis Fókaias; Turkish: Foça Katliamı) occurred in June 1914, as part of the ethnic cleansing policies of the Ottoman Empire that included exile, massacre and deportations. It was perpetrated by irregular Turkish bands against the predominantly ethnic Greek town of Phocaea, modern Foça, on the east coast of the Aegean Sea. The massacre was part of a wider anti-Greek campaign of genocide launched by the Young Turk Ottoman authorities, which included boycott, intimidation, forced deportations and mass killings; and was one of the worst attacks during the summer of 1914.

== Background ==
In 1914, the Ottoman Empire had just emerged from the disastrous Balkan Wars, in which it had lost most of its European territories, except for Eastern Thrace, to the Christian Balkan League. Hundreds of thousands of Balkan Muslim refugees began streaming into the Empire.

At the same time tensions mounted with the Kingdom of Greece over possession of the islands of the northeastern Aegean, which Greece had captured during the wars. In February 1914, the Great Powers decided that Greece would keep most of them, a decision that the Ottoman government rejected. A Greco-Ottoman naval race was the result, with threats of war over the issue of the islands. In this atmosphere, the Greek population of the Ottoman Empire became a target of the Young Turk Ottoman government, from a press campaign against them, limitations to the autonomy of their educational institutions, the imposition of military service, as well as various financial measures, culminating in a boycott of Greek-owned businesses.

The Young Turk leadership began implementing ethnic cleansing policies in the spring of 1914. The Greek communities of the Aegean region of Anatolia and Eastern Thrace were targeted, facing boycott, intimidation, attacks by irregulars and massacre. Some communities had the opportunity to avoid death by converting to Islam. In the Aidin Vilayet, on the Aegean coast of Anatolia, a total of 8,000–10,000 armed irregulars were operating as part of this campaign. According to reports submitted by the Danish consul of nearby Smyrna, Alfred Van de Zee, these groups were financed and run by the Ottoman state.

== Life before the attack ==
The French engineer and archaeologist Félix Sartiaux, who was in the town with his excavation team, provides a vivid account of life in Phocaea before the attack. He reports that the Greek population of Phocaea numbered just over 7,000, while the nearby settlement of New Phocaea had slightly more than 6,500 Greeks. The Phocaean Kaza (an administrative division of the Ottoman Empire, similar to district) had a total population of around 20,000, of which around 80% were Greeks.

Sartiaux describes a peaceful coexistence between the communities. The residents, both Turks and Greeks, lived quietly and worked as farmers, fishermen, or laborers in the nearby saltworks, with no notable conflicts between them.

== Massacre ==
During early June 1914, Turkish irregular bands looted the villages south of Menemen, causing the Greek populations to flee. On 11 June, waves of Greek refugees from the surrounding poured into nearby Phocaea (Eskifoça and Yeni Foça) seeking asylum or attempting to embark on ships to escape. Phocaea, a coastal town north of Smyrna, comprised ca. 9,000 inhabitants and was predominantly populated by ethnic Greeks.

On 12 June, irregular bands launched their attack against Phocaea itself. The attack began during the night from three different sides and was well organized from the beginning. The armed groups broke into several dwellings and shot their inhabitants, irrespective of age and sex, while apart from the killings, several rapes also occurred. German ambassador Wangenheim and American ambassador Henry Morgenthau reported that about fifty people had been killed, while reports of Greek refugees from Phocaea raised the number to 100. The bodies of those massacred were thrown into wells and included priests, old men and children. Dwellings and stores which were already abandoned by the panic-stricken population were systematically looted.

The amount of the looted property was so extensive and widespread that even irregular groups who did not participate in the massacre and the destruction took part in the share. The surviving civilian population ran to the harbor and tried to escape by boat. Due to the general disorder, some people were drowned while trying to swim in order to save themselves.

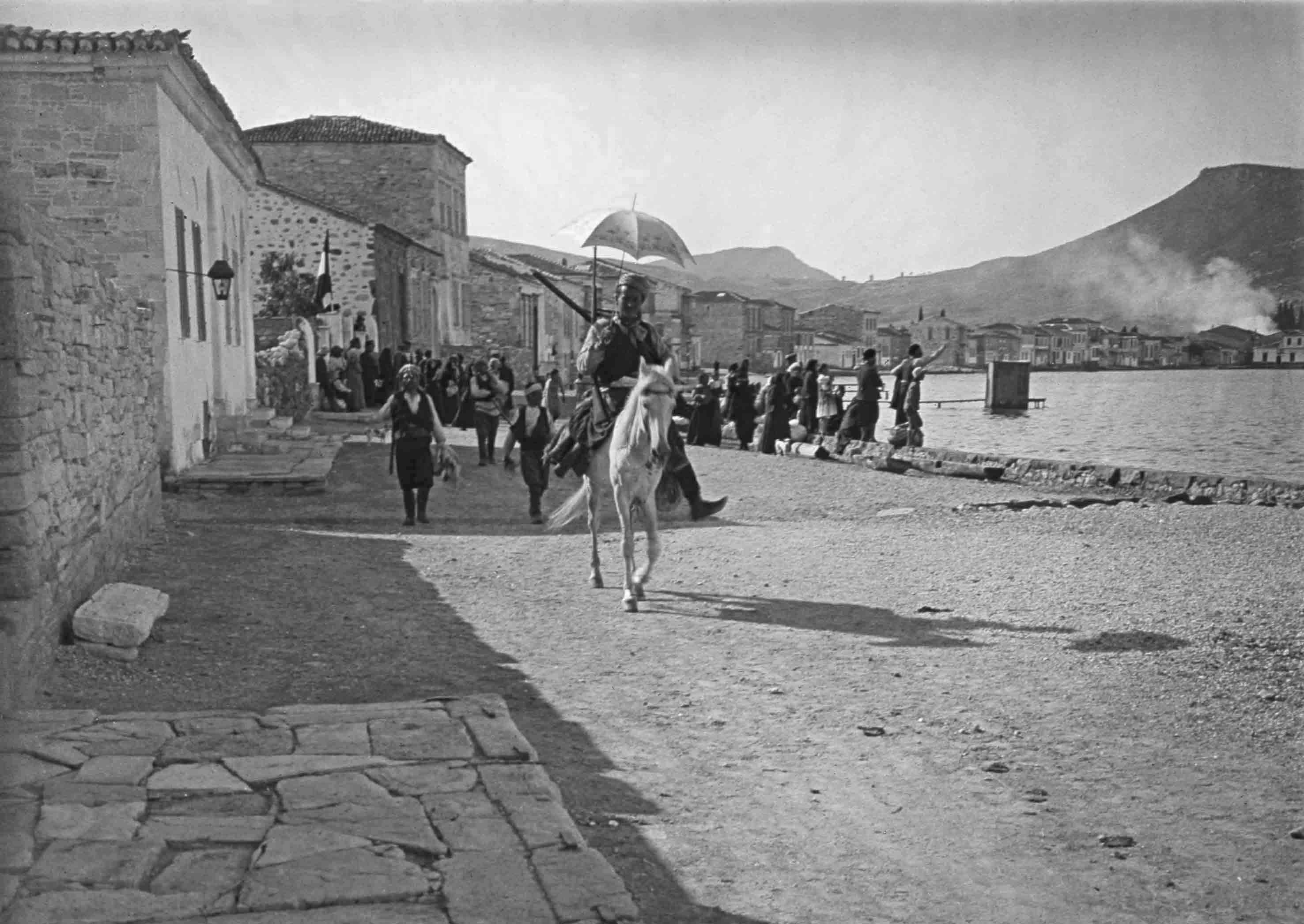
Turkish Cretan irregulars with booty, while some buildings of Old Phocaea are in flames and the Greeks await for departure, picture taken by archaeologist Félix Sartiaux

On 25 June, the Danish consul of Smyrna, Alfred Van de Zee, quoted an eyewitness of the destruction:

[W]ithin a quarter of an hour after the assault had begun every boat in the place was full of people trying to get away and when no more boats could be had the inhabitants sought refuge on the little peninsula on which the lighthouse stands. I saw eleven bodies of men and women lying dead on the shore. How many were killed I could not say, but trying to get into a house of which the door stood ajar I saw two other dead bodies lying in the entrance hall. Every shop in the place was looted and the goods that could not be carried away were wantonly destroyed.

Also, Félix Sartiaux and his excavation team witnessed the massacre. Sartiaux's documented testimony and photos are invaluable in describing the sequence of events before and during the massacre.

The French archaeological mission took drastic measures to help the remaining population and managed to save hundreds of them. They hoisted French flags on their homes and provided shelter whenever possible while the irregular groups were still committing atrocities. According to French archaeologist and eyewitness, Charles Manciet, the Ottoman authorities sent regular troops to Phocaea to deal with the perpetrators, but these troops also participated in the destruction of the town. Manciet mentions that when they left their houses, he saw the most disgraceful acts ever imaginable. He also states that on 17 June soldiers were sent from İzmir to establish order but these soldiers ended up plundering the town and that the murder and plunder continued until the 18 June. Manciet states that the atrocities he had witnessed were of an organized nature that aimed at circling Christian peasant populations of the region. He also eyewitness packed camels climbing the mountains through the roads connecting Eski Foça to outside while they were full with the plunder taken from the town.

In addition, the German reporter, Harry Stuermer, who was the correspondent of Kölnische Zeitung newspaper and was usually sympathetic to Turkish authorities later saw the town's "smoking ruins".

Newspapers of that time reported that many Greek refugees, who fled from the region, had bayonet and bullet wounds and they were starving. In addition, they stated that the Turks set on fire some of the Greek properties.

Also, Muslim residents of the town mention the massacre. They also stated that when the Greeks left, their houses were occupied by muhacirs (forced Muslim migrants). According to a local Muslim resident testimony, the local Muslims were happier with Greeks as their sharecroppers compared to having muhacirs and described the members of the chettes (irregular armed forces) as foreigners to the region and cursed them as "rats" who "looted, stole and burned down Greek property". According to another local testimony, "there was so much looting going on… everybody took what was left from Greeks, food, carpets, furniture…". People who belonged to the local networks were radically different in their perception of the Greeks compared to the muhacirs who were alien to the local networks. The local communities favored the Greeks.

When Félix Sartiaux visited New Phocaea a week later, he found a scene similar to that in Phocaea: the town was deserted, looted, and in ruins. A few wounded individuals had been left behind in the streets, including a 99-year-old woman whom one of the archaeologists carried on his back.

== Rescue ==
The Ottoman authorities tried to cover up the incident. However, after two days a French steam tug boat arrived at Smyrna and spread the news about the massacre. The crew had observed a large number of people on the promontory and sent ca. 700 survivors to the nearby Greek island of Lesbos. The Greek authorities there rescued the remaining 5,000–6,000 inhabitants by sending boats to bring them to the island. According to Manciet, the massacre continued until 18 June, when there were no Greek inhabitants left and Phocaea was finally turned into a ghost town.

== Aftermath ==
Immediately before the massacre, the county reached a population of approximately 23,000 people, most of whom were Ottoman Greeks, but after the forced migration and killing of the Ottoman Greeks due to the massacre the population of the entire county decreased to 4,000.

The events in Phocaea elicited sympathy for the victims in Europe, especially in France. The people of Marseille, which was founded by Phocaeans circa 600 BC, raised a sum of 20,000 French francs to support the refugees.

Similar activity was also carried out by Turkish irregular bands against several other settlements in western Anatolia, while on one occasion almost all inhabitants of the village of Serekieuy, near Menemen, were killed after local Greeks armed themselves for resistance. These attacks against the Ottoman Greeks were performed in manner similar to those undertaken at the time against the Armenian population in eastern provinces of the Ottoman Empire.

In 1914, a total of ca. 154,000 ethnic Greek inhabitants living in the Ottoman Empire lost their homes. With the outbreak of World War I, the Ottoman policies against the Greek communities took a more violent and systematic form and affected a more extensive area, including also the Pontus in northern Anatolia. These policies included confiscations of property, as well as the creation of forced labor battalions for all Greek males. Therefore, the Ottoman government deported many Ottoman Greeks to inner Anatolia.

== Legacy ==
A 2014 documentary film titled Gegonota sti Fokaia 1914 directed by Agnes Sklavos and Stelio Tatakis was showcased in the 17th Thessaloniki Documentary Festival in 2015.

== See also ==
- Outline of the Greek genocide

== Sources ==
- Boubougiatzi, Evaggelia (2009). Οι διωγμοί των Ελλήνων της Ιωνίας 1914–1922 [The Persecution of Greeks in Ionia 1914–1922] (Thesis) (in Greek). University of Western Macedonia.
- Lieberman, Benjamin (2013). The Holocaust and Genocides in Europe. New York: Continuum Publishing Corporation. ISBN 978-1441194787.
- Llewellyn-Smith, Michael (1999). Ionian Vision: Greece in Asia Minor, 1919–1922 (2nd impression, new ed.). London: C. Hurst. ISBN 978-1850653684.
- Schaller, Dominik J.; Zimmerer, Jürgen (13 September 2013). Late Ottoman Genocides: The Dissolution of the Ottoman Empire and Young Turkish Population and Extermination Policies. Routledge. p. 41. ISBN 978-1-317-99045-1.
