= Elias Venezis =

Greek novelist (1904–1973)

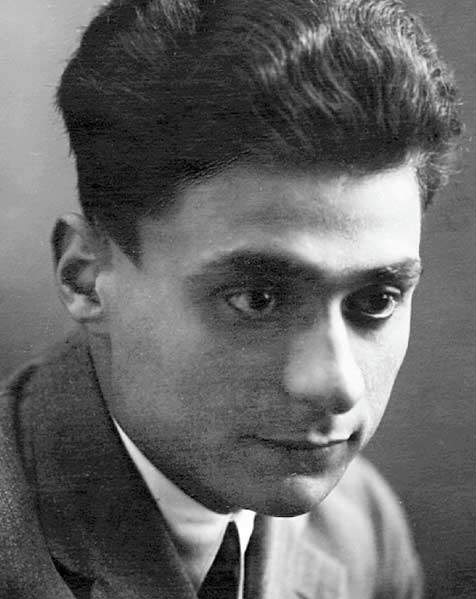
- Elias Venezis in 1925
- Born: Elias Mellos; 4 March 1904; Ayvalık (Kydonies), Ottoman Empire
- Died: 3 August 1973 (aged 69); Athens, Greece
- Occupation: Novelist

Elias Venezis (Greek: Ηλίας Βενέζης; March 4, 1904 – August 3, 1973) is the pseudonym of Elias Mellos (Ηλίας Μέλλος), a major Greek novelist. He was born in 1904 in Ayvalık (Kydonies) in Asia Minor and died in Athens in 1973. He wrote many books, of which the most famous are Number 31328 and Aeolian Earth. He is considered to be one of the writers of "Generation of the '30s".

== Biography ==
Elias Venezis was born and raised in Kydonies (modern Ayvalık, Turkey), where he completed high school. In 1914, Venezis’ family fled from Kydonies to Lesbos to avoid persecution but returned to Asia Minor after the Greek army invaded Smyrna and its hinterland in 1919. When the area was recaptured by the Turkish Army in 1922, Venezis was taken prisoner and enslaved in a "labour battalion". He was 18 years old. The prisoners were marched into the interior, but few arrived at the destination, since most of them were either killed on the way, or died of the hardships they were exposed to. Of the 3000 "conscripted" into his “labour brigade” only 23 survived.

When Venezis was released he was returned to Lesbos. There he met Stratis Myrivilis, who had founded the weekly newspaper Kambana, and was encouraged by him to write an account of "his horrific experiences as a hostage in Turkey" for the newspaper. The novel which resulted was published in serialised form in Kambana in 1924. However it did not become well known in Greece until an expanded version was published in book form in 1931.

His major novels are about his life in Asia Minor: Aeolian Land describes the lost Eden of his childhood summers; Number 31328 the horrific experience of the death marches, and Tranquility his struggle to adjust to living in Greece.

In Greece, Venezis worked for a bank while writing in his spare time. He married Stavritsa Molyviati in 1938. She too was from Ayvalik.

During the German occupation of Greece, Venezis was taken prisoner again. He was released following the intercession of high-ranking Greek officials including Archbishop Damaskinos.

After the war, Venezis wrote a column in the newspaper Acropolis. He was made a member of the Academy of Athens.

== Books by Elias Venezis ==
- Number 31328 (Το Νούμερο 31328, 1924; 1931)
- Manolis Lekas and Other Stories (1928)
- Tranquility (Γαλήνη, 1939)
- Aeolian Earth (Αιολική Γη, 1943)
- Block C (play, 1945)
- Exodus (Έξοδος, 1950)

== Books in English ==
- Elias Venezis by Alexander & Helen Karanikas (New York: Twayne Publishers, 1969)
- Block C by Elias Venezis (Athens: I.D. Kollarou, 1946)
- Aeolia by Elias Venezis, trans. E. D. Scott-Kilvert (London: William Campion, 1949; New York: Vanguard Press, 1957)
- Aiolian Land by Elias Venezis (Montréal: McGill University, 1979) in the series The McGill University Companions to Modern Greek Studies
- Land of Aeolia by Ilias Venezis - Therese Sellers (Translator) - Denise Harvey 2021
