= Labour battalions (Turkey) =

Form of unfree labour in the late Ottoman Empire

Greek genocide

Background
- Young Turk Revolution, Ottoman Greeks, Pontic Greeks, Ottoman Empire

The genocide
- Labour battalions, Death march, Pontic Greek genocide, Phocaea massacre, Evacuation of Ayvalik, İzmit massacres, 1914 Greek deportations, Samsun deportations, Amasya trials, Burning of Smyrna

Resistance
- Greek resistance during the Greek genocide, Seventh Battle of Dazli, Anton Pasha, Efkleidis Kourtidis

Foreign aid and relief
- Relief Committee for Greeks of Asia Minor, American Committee for Relief in the Near East, Asa Jennings, Esther Pohl Lovejoy

Responsible parties
- Young Turks or Committee of Union and Progress; Three Pashas: Talat, Enver, Djemal; Bahaeddin Şakir, Teskilati Mahsusa or Special Organization, Nureddin Pasha, Topal Osman, Mustafa Kemal Atatürk

See also
- Greco-Turkish War (1919–1922), Greeks in Turkey, Population Exchange, Greek refugees, Armenian genocide, Assyrian genocide, Diyarbekir genocide, Istanbul trials of 1919–1920, Malta Tribunals

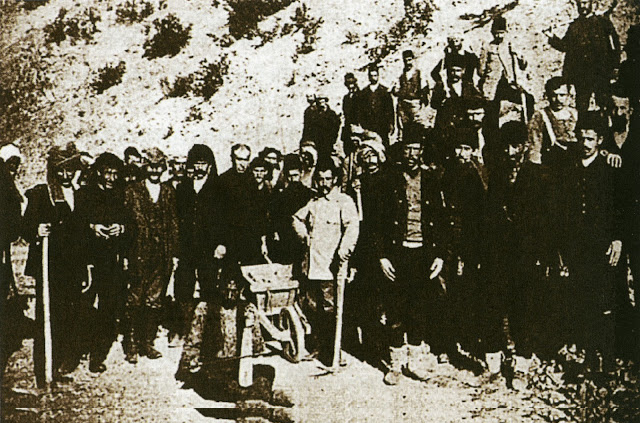
Men of the labour battalions

Ottoman labour battalions (Turkish: Amele Taburları, Armenian: Աշխատանքային գումարտակ, romanized: Ashkhatank’ayin gumartak, Greek: Τάγματα Εργασίας, romanized: Tagmata Ergasias (Note: More often, the transliterated Turkish term αμελέ ταμπουρού is used)) were a form of unfree labour in the late Ottoman Empire. The term is associated with the disarmament and murder of Ottoman Armenian soldiers during World War I, of Ottoman Greeks during the Greek genocide in the Ottoman Empire and also during the Turkish War of Independence.

The labour battalions are considered an example of slavery. The brutal conditions in these battalions resulted in a very high death rate among victims, reaching from 80% to as high as 99%.

== Overview ==
During World War I, the Ottoman Empire relied on the labor battalions for the logistical organization of the army. The Empire had a scarce railway infrastructure at the time. According to Hilmar Kaiser, men assigned to the battalions varied between 25,000 and 50,000, depending on whether it was war or peace. The laborers were assigned to perform construction works on the roads and railways and to transport the supplies the army needed in the battle front. Most of the recruits were Christians, amongst which the Armenians were the largest contingent besides the Greeks and Syriac Christians.

== Armenians in labour battalions ==
Armenians did not serve in the armed forces in the Ottoman Empire until Young Turk Revolution.

On 25 February 1915, following the defeat of the Ottomans in the Battle of Sarikamish, the Ottoman General Staff released the War Minister Enver Pasha's Directive 8682 which stated that as a result of Armenian attacks on soldiers and the stockpiling of bombs in Armenian houses, "Armenians shall strictly not be employed in mobile armies, in mobile and stationary gendarmeries, or in any armed services." Enver Pasha explained this decision as "out of fear that they would collaborate with the Russians." The Armenians which before were deployed in the Battle of Sarikamish were disarmed and included into the labor battalions. Traditionally, the Ottoman Army only drafted non-Muslim males between 20 and 45 years old into the regular army. Younger (15–20) and older (45–60) non-Muslim soldiers had always been used as logistical support through the labour battalions. Conditions for the Armenian labourers were harsh. They had little food, and guards beat them frequently. Many suffered from disease. Before February, some of the Armenian recruits were utilized as labourers (hamals); they would ultimately be executed.

== Greeks in labour battalions ==
Anatolian Greeks, like the Armenians, were forced into labour battalions. Christians were first drafted in 31 March Incident. The government was ambivalent about drafting Christians: on one hand, they needed a large army with conflicts and war brewing on all fronts; on the other hand, many Ottomans believed that Christians were sympathetic to the Christian nations that the Ottoman Empire was fighting (for example, during the Balkan Wars).

By 1915, most Greek men of army age had been conscripted into labour battalions. They maintained tunnels, built roads, and worked on farms. They had little food and wore tattered clothes. A foreign consul said this of Greek labourers in Konya:

I have seen these wretched men in the hospitals of Konia [sic] stretched upon their beds or on the ground, living skeletons, longing for death...The cemetery is already filled with the tombs of men serving in the labour battalions.

Greek males forced into labor battalions often died quickly and under crippling conditions in quarries, mines, and roads, or were killed by their Turkish guards.

For example, approximately 80% of the Greek labourers forced to work at İslâhiye, near Gaziantep, died. One English intelligence officer said that "the life of a Greek in a labour gang is generally about two months." Other foreigners reported that dead Greeks were thrown into mass graves, with as many as six bodies piled in a single grave.

In 1921, Turkish authorities made false birth certificates declaring Greek orphans to be older than they actually were. In this way, teenage boys were also conscripted into labour battalions. In 1922, Herbert Adams Gibbons relayed a report by the Near East Relief to the U.S. Secretary of State Charles Evans Hughes, which warned that the Greeks were in a condition "worse than slavery". Even Mark Lambert Bristol, who had a notably pro-Turkish bias, reported that the Greek men in labour battalions were "treated like animals."

A few days after the Turkish capture of Smyrna and the beginning of the Burning of Smyrna, in 16 September 1922, Turkish commander Nureddin Pasha ordered that all Greek and Armenian men aged 18 to 45 be arrested and sent to labour battalions. This order was signed by Mustafa Kemal. Despite the age limits, males as young as 15 and as old as 60 were arrested. Greek and Armenian families were then given until 30 September to leave Turkey, with anyone missing that deadline being conscripted into labour battalions as well. Estimates of those deported after 16 September range from 120,000 to 270,000 and, of that number, only 320 eventually returned to Greece, and none of them were women or children.

Two memoirs depict the experiences of Greeks in labour battalions. Elias Venezis, who survived the labour battalions, wrote about his experience in Number 31328: The Book of Slavery. American author Thea Halo, daughter of genocide survivor Sano Halo, wrote about her mother's experiences in the book Not Even My Name. Sano Halo, a Pontian Greek, recalled that her father and grandfather had been taken to the labour battalions when she was a young girl. Her father escaped and returned to the family, but her grandfather never came home.

== Depictions ==
The Greek novelist Elias Venezis later described the situation in his work The Number 31328: The Book of Slavery (Το Νούμερο 31328). According to his account, of the 3000 "conscripted" into Venezis' labour brigade, only 23 survived.

Leyla Neyzi has published a study of the diary of Yaşar Paker, a member of the Jewish community of early 20th century Angora/Ankara who was drafted to the Labour Battalions twice, first during the Greco-Turkish War (1919–1922) and then again during World War II, a war in which Turkey did not take part. Neyzi's paper on the basis of Paker's diary published by Jewish Social Studies presents an overall picture for the conditions in these battalions, which were composed entirely of non-Muslims.

Dido Sotiriou in her anti-war novel Farewell Anatolia describes the harsh conditions of the labour battalions through the experiences of the protagonist.

== See also ==
- Labour battalion
