= Félix Sartiaux =

- Born: 1876
- Died: 1944 (aged 67–68)
- Occupations: Engineer; Archaeologist

Félix Sartiaux (1876-1944) was a French engineer and amateur archaeologist who eye-witnessed the Massacre of Phocaea.

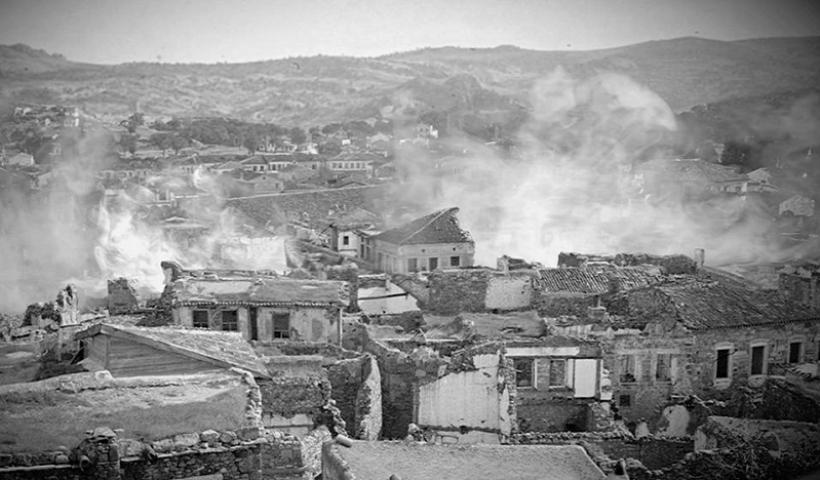
Old Phocaea burning, photographed by Sartiaux

Sartiaux was a graduate of the Polytechnique and Director of Operations at the French Northern Railway Company. In 1913, he traveled to Asia Minor commissioned by the French state to carry out archaeological excavations at the ancient town of Old Phocaea. During his second mission to Phocaea in 1914, he and his excavation team witnessed the violent looting and massacre of the town by Ottoman Turk irregulars. Sartiaux and his three assistants, hoisted French flags on their homes and provided shelter to fleeing Greeks. Around 700-800 people were saved from the attacks and were later evacuated by boats to Greece. Sartiaux's documented testimony and photos are invaluable in describing the sequence of events before and during the massacre.

Between 1919 and 1920, following the end of WWI, many Phocaeans including Sartiaux, returned to Phocaea but were expelled once again in 1922 after the burning of Smyrna. Sartiaux published documents and photos of his archaeological work including the events of the massacre in French. The photographs, notes and correspondence of Sartiaux were discovered in different archives and were published in 2008 and 2012 by the Greek photo historian Haris Yiakoumis (Greek: Χάρης Γιακουμής).
