= Thea Halo =

American poet

Thea Halo (born 1941) is an American writer and painter of Assyrian and Pontic Greek heritage. Born in New York City, she is the 8th child of Abraham and Sano Halo (original name Euthemia "Themia", Pontic Greek: Ευθυμία). Thea began writing poetry and short-stories in 1992 and in 2000 she published her book Not Even My Name (ISBN 0312262116), the memoir of her mother who belonged to Turkey's Pontic Greek minority, natives of the Black Sea coast region of Turkey known as Pontus.

Sano "Themia" Halo was a recipient of the New York State Governor's Award for excellence in honor of Women's History Month, "Celebrating Women of Courage and Vision."

Not Even My Name is the story of Sano (Themia) Halo's survival of the death march, at age ten, during the Greek genocide that killed her family. The title refers to Themia being renamed to Sano by an Assyrian family who could not pronounce her Greek name, after they took her in as a servant during the Greek genocide. The story is told by her daughter Thea, and includes their mother-daughter pilgrimage to Pontus, Turkey in search of Sano's home seventy years after her exile.
