= Number 31328 =

- Short story by Elias Venezis
- Original title: Νούμερο 31328
- Country: Greece
- Language: Greek
- Genre: Autobiographical

Publication
- Published in: Magazine
- Publisher: Kambana
- Publication date: 1924

Number 31328 (Greek: Το Νούμερο 31328) is an autobiographical novel by Elias Venezis. It tells of his experiences as a captive of the Turkish Army on a death march into the Anatolia interior.

== Background ==
During the Greek genocide, Venezis' family fled from Ayvali to Lesbos to avoid persecution but returned to Asia Minor after the Greek army occupied Smyrna and its hinterland in 1919. When the area was recaptured by the Turkish Army, Venezis was taken prisoner and enslaved in a labour battalion (otherwise known as Amele Taburlari or Amele Taburu). He was 18 years old. The prisoners were forcibly marched into the interior, but few arrived at the destination, since most of them were either killed on the way, or died of the hardships they were exposed to. Of the 3000 "conscripted" into his "labour brigade", only 23 survived.

When Venezis was released he was returned to Lesbos. There he met Stratis Myrivilis, who had founded the weekly newspaper Kambana, and was encouraged by him to write an account of "his horrific experiences as a hostage in Turkey". The novel which resulted was published in serialised form in Kambana in 1924. However it did not become well known in Greece until an expanded version was published in book form in 1931.

The film 1922 (1978) by Nikos Koundouros was based on the book.

== Plot summary ==
The story starts in Aivali (Ayvalık), and takes us through the first days of the Turkish re-capture of the town. The way to amele taburu is slowly but steadily painted in pale and crimson, in the red bloodstained steps of bare wounded feet walking on hot summer sand. The life of the captives, as seen through the eyes of one who lived through these horrific experiences numbs the spirit of the reader too. The few bright sparks of humanity in a wasteland of inhumanity are treasured, as people are treated as if worthless: struck to death with hammers, lethally wounded and left to die alone, raped and then killed. All hope and all light is lost, despite the occasional effort by the prisoners to help each other—sincere at first, then worn down and half-hearted, until at last utter indifference.
