= Foça =

- District and municipality
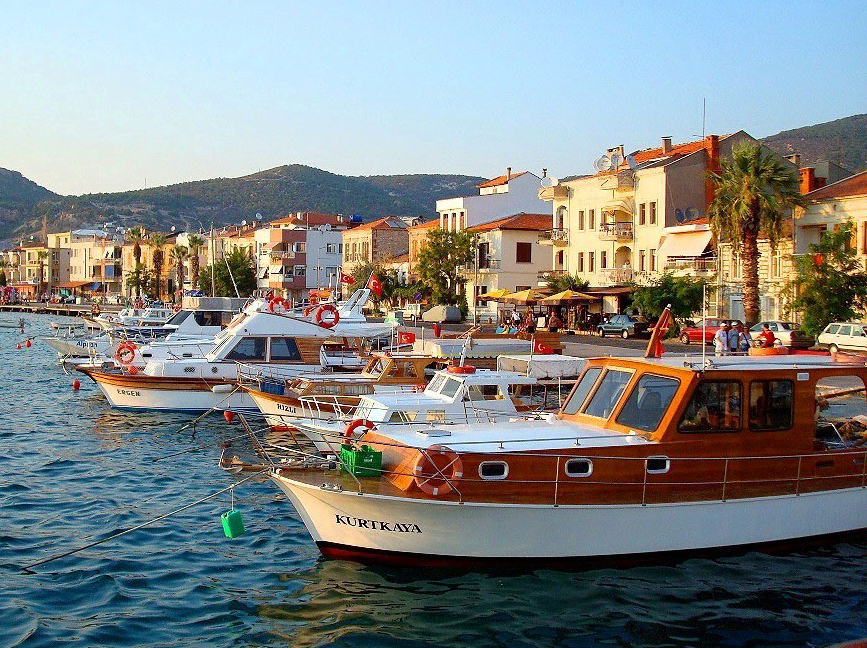
- Marina of Foça

- Map showing Foça District in İzmir Province

- Location within Turkey Location within İzmir
- Coordinates: 38°40′N 26°46′E
- Country: Turkey
- Province: İzmir

Government
  - Mayor: Saniye Bora Fıçı (CHP)
- Area: 251 km^{2} (97 sq mi)
- Population (2022): 34,946
  - Density: 139/km^{2} (361/sq mi)
- Time zone: UTC+3 (TRT)
- Postal code: 35410
- Area code: 0232
- Website: www.foca.bel.tr

Foça is a municipality and district of İzmir Province, Turkey. Its area is 251 km^{2}, and its population is 34,946 (2022). The town of Foça is situated at about 69 km (43 mi) northwest of İzmir's city center on the Aegean coast. The district has a settlement and former municipality named Yenifoça (literally "New Foça"), also along the Aegean Sea shore and at a distance of 20 km (12 mi) from Foça proper. For this reason, Foça itself is locally often called as Eskifoça ("Old Foça") in daily parlance.

== History ==
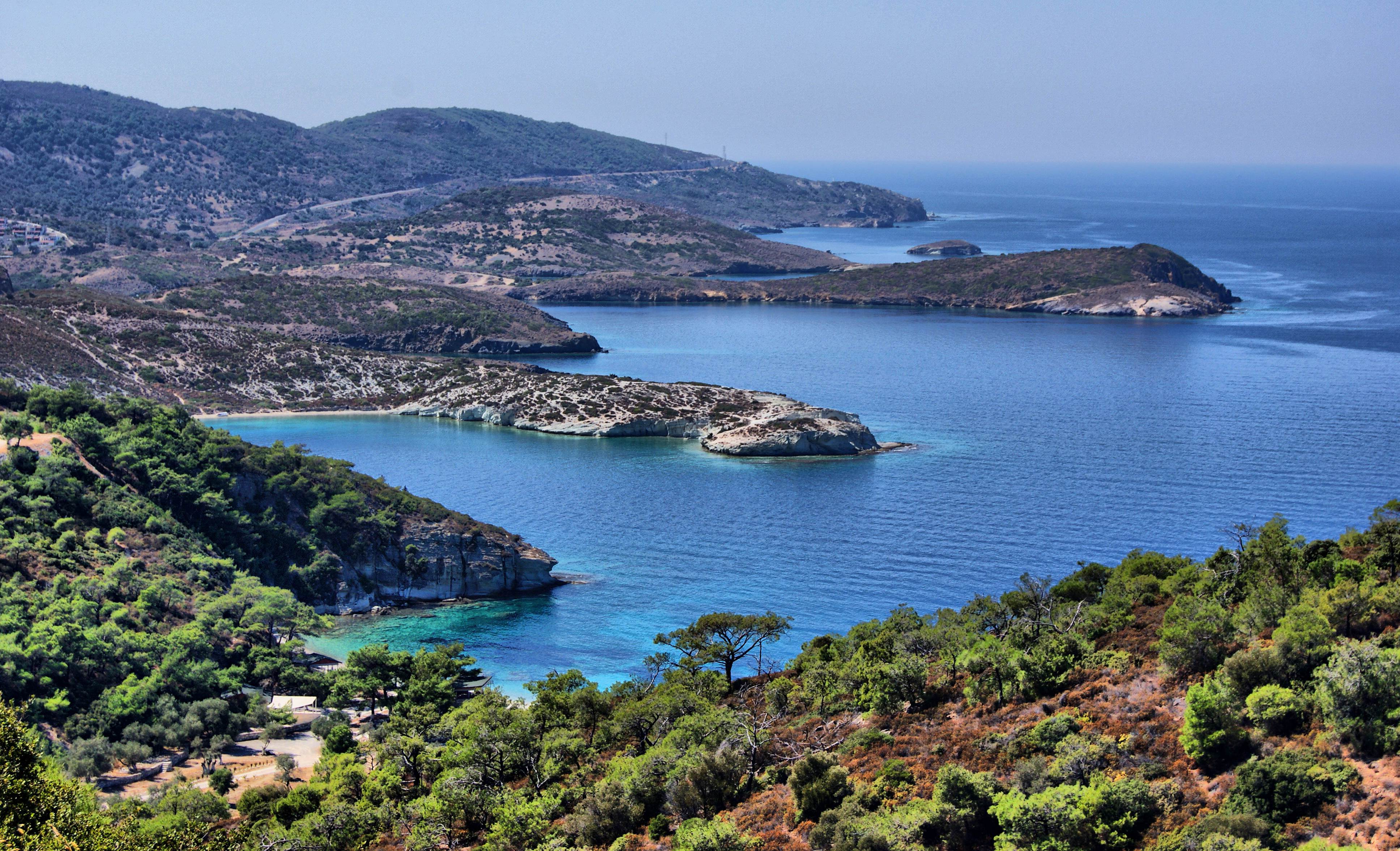
Coastline near Foça

The town of Phocaea (Φώκαια) was founded by ancient Greeks. Phocaea, named after the seals living in nearby islands, was founded by the Aeolian Greeks in the 11th century BC. Ionian Greek settlement in Phocaea, which was one of the most important settlements of Ionia at that time, started in the 9th century BC. Phocaeans, known as master sailors in history, also established many colonies in the Aegean, Mediterranean and Black Sea with their engineering development and success. Some of the important colonies that they had established in history are: Massalia, modern Marseille; Amisos in the Black Sea (now Samsun); Lampsakos in the Dardanelles (now Lapseki); Methymna (now Molyvos) on Lesbos; and Elea, now Ascea (Italy); Alalia (Corsica).

In addition, Phocaeans were known as ones of the first in Ionia to mint "electrum" coins using natural gold-silver mixture. Of course, this civilized progress affected many civilizations of that time and attracted them to Anatolia.

Phocaea was taken over by the Genoese in 1275 as a fief from the Byzantine emperor, and was an active Port during the Middle Ages, principally due to the region's rich alum reserves. The alum mines of Phocaea were conceded earlier by the Byzantines in 1267 to the Genoese brothers Benedetto and Manuele Zaccaria, who founded the Lordship of Phocaea. The Genoese controlled the city even during the Ottoman era due to the lease they had gained from the Byzantines in 1275. Another important Byzantine concession to the Genoese through dowry was the nearby island of Lesbos, given to the Gattilusio family as a result of the marriage between Francesco I Gattilusio and Maria Palaiologina, sister of Byzantine emperor John V Palaiologos) in 1355. The possessions of the Gattilusio family eventually grew to include, among others, the islands of Imbros, Samothrace, Lemnos and Thasos, and the city of Aenos (modern Enez in Turkey.) From this position, they were heavily involved in the mining and marketing of alum, useful in textile production and a profitable trade controlled by the Genoese.

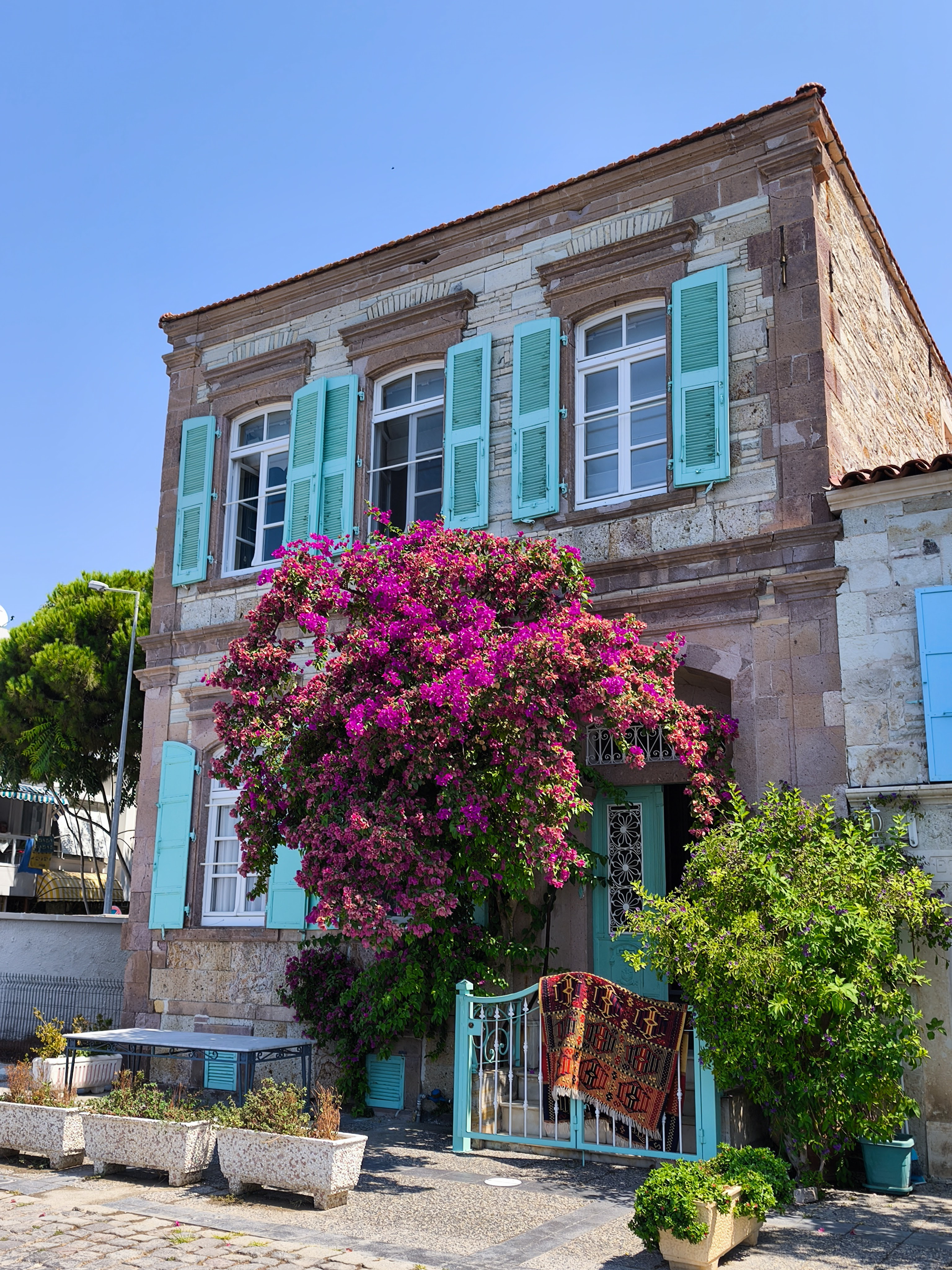
Foça's traditional houses

From 1867 until 1922, Foça was part of the Aidin Vilayet of the Ottoman Empire. The city was mostly populated by Greeks until the Massacre of Phocaea carried out by the Turks during the Greek genocide. As a result, a large portion of the historic city was destroyed, and all the old churches were destroyed and mosques were built on top of them and the town subsequently became known as Foça. People who belonged to the local networks were radically different in their perception of the Greeks compared to the muhacirs who were alien to the local networks. The local communities favored the Greeks. Also, when the Greeks left, due to the massacre, their houses were occupied by muhacirs (forced Muslim migrants). Some of these Greeks returned later (1919) to their houses, when the Greek army arrived at the city. The muhacirs that lived there ran away when the Greeks returned. When the Greek army was defeated (1922), according to a testimony of a muhacir, some Greeks who tried to escape with boats or other things "were stopped and the punishments they deserved were delivered to them in and around the harbor of Eski Foça". The Greeks that did escape founded the new community of Nea Fokaia in Halkidiki, Greece.

Eski Foça stretches along two bays; a larger one named Büyükdeniz ("Greater Sea") and a smaller cove within that large one, named Küçükdeniz ("Smaller Sea"), where the medieval Foça Castle is also located.

Many parts of the district are under strict environmental protection, due to the value of the flora and the fauna, and the beauty of the small bays and coves, especially between Foça and Yenifoça. Therefore, a judicious way to get to know the district would be by boat tours regularly organized in partance from the town center. Because of the protective measures, new constructions are not permitted in many parts of the district and Foça is set to preserve its unique characteristic as composed principally of old houses.

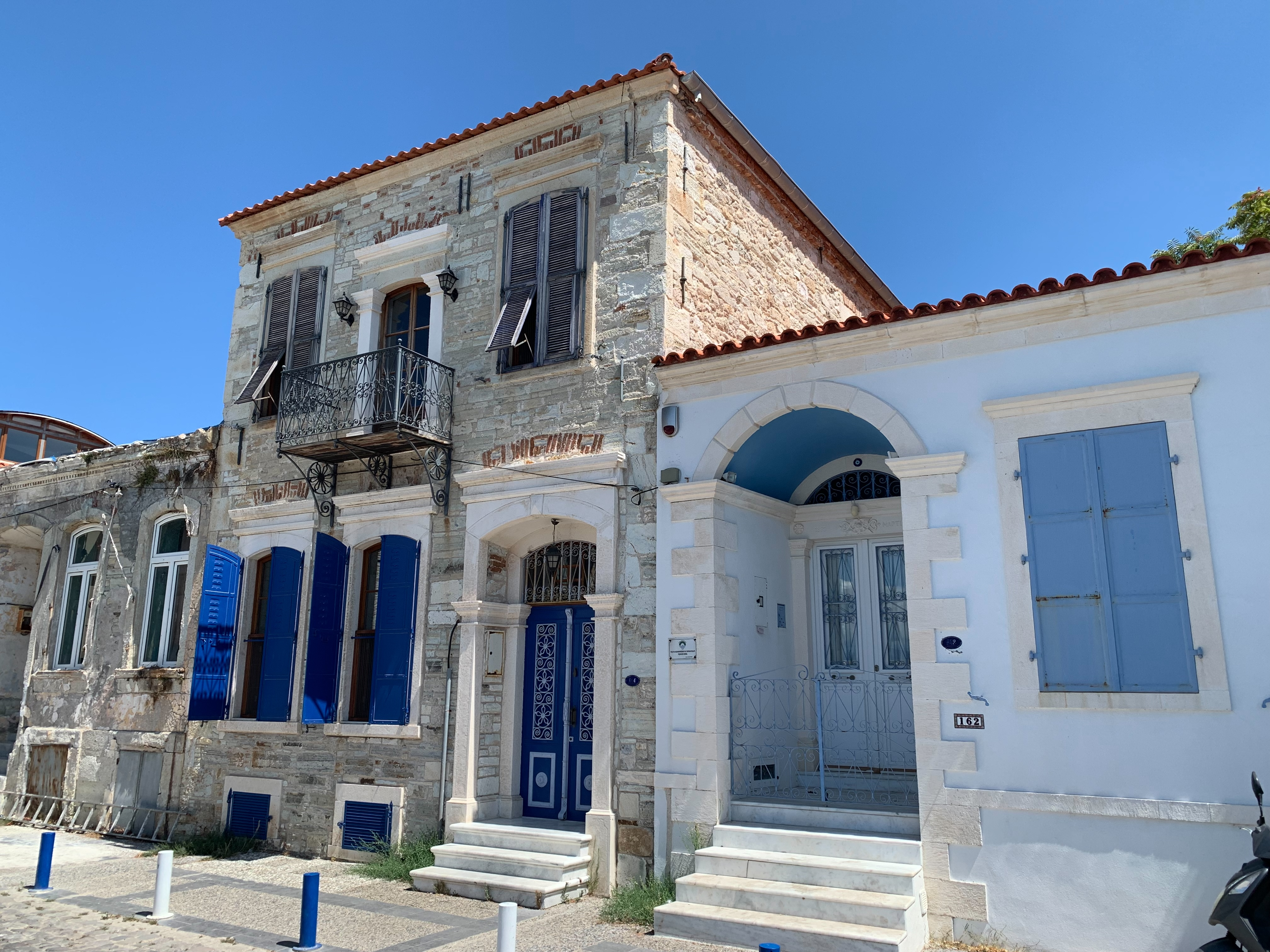
Foça's old town.

The construction project for a 300-boat capacity marina in Foça is recently tendered and started, upon the completion of which the town is expected to open to more active international tourism.

Foça is the site of one of three marine protected areas established in Turkey for the preservation of the Mediterranean monk seal, a heavily endangered species of sea mammals.

The Turkish Navy maintains at Foça the home base of its two special operations units, Su Altı Savunma (SAS) and Su Altı Taarruz (SAT).

== Gallery ==
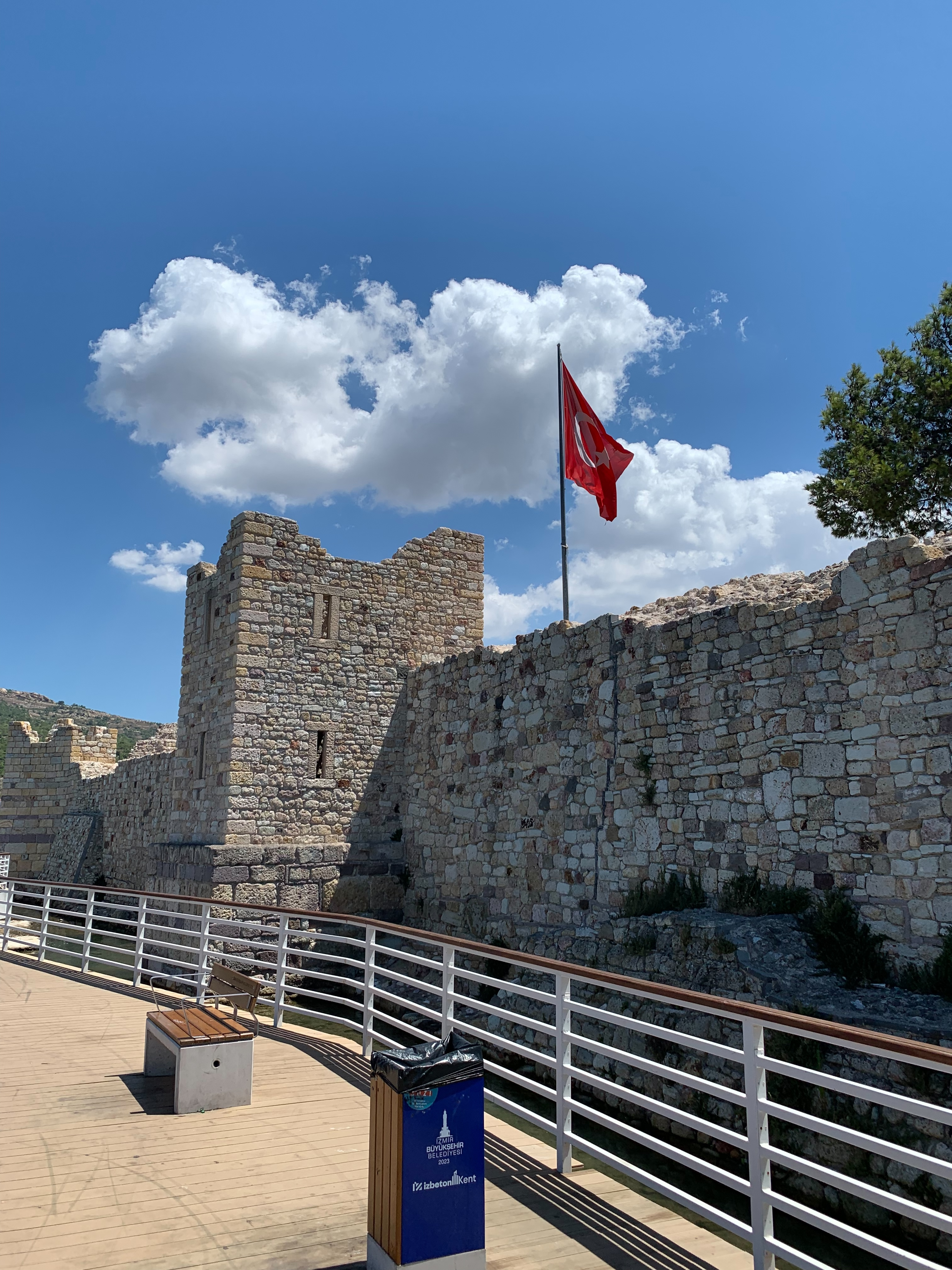

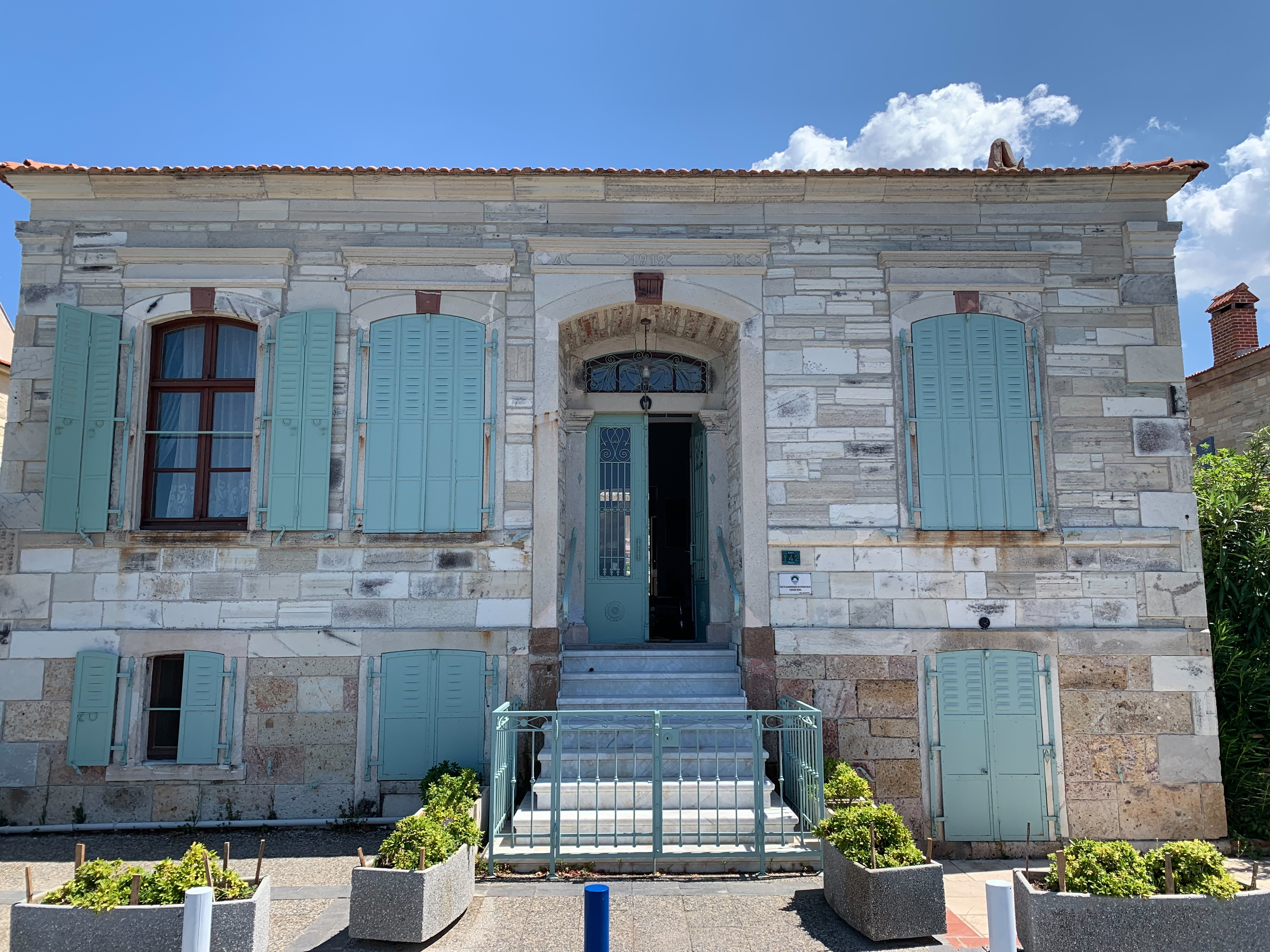

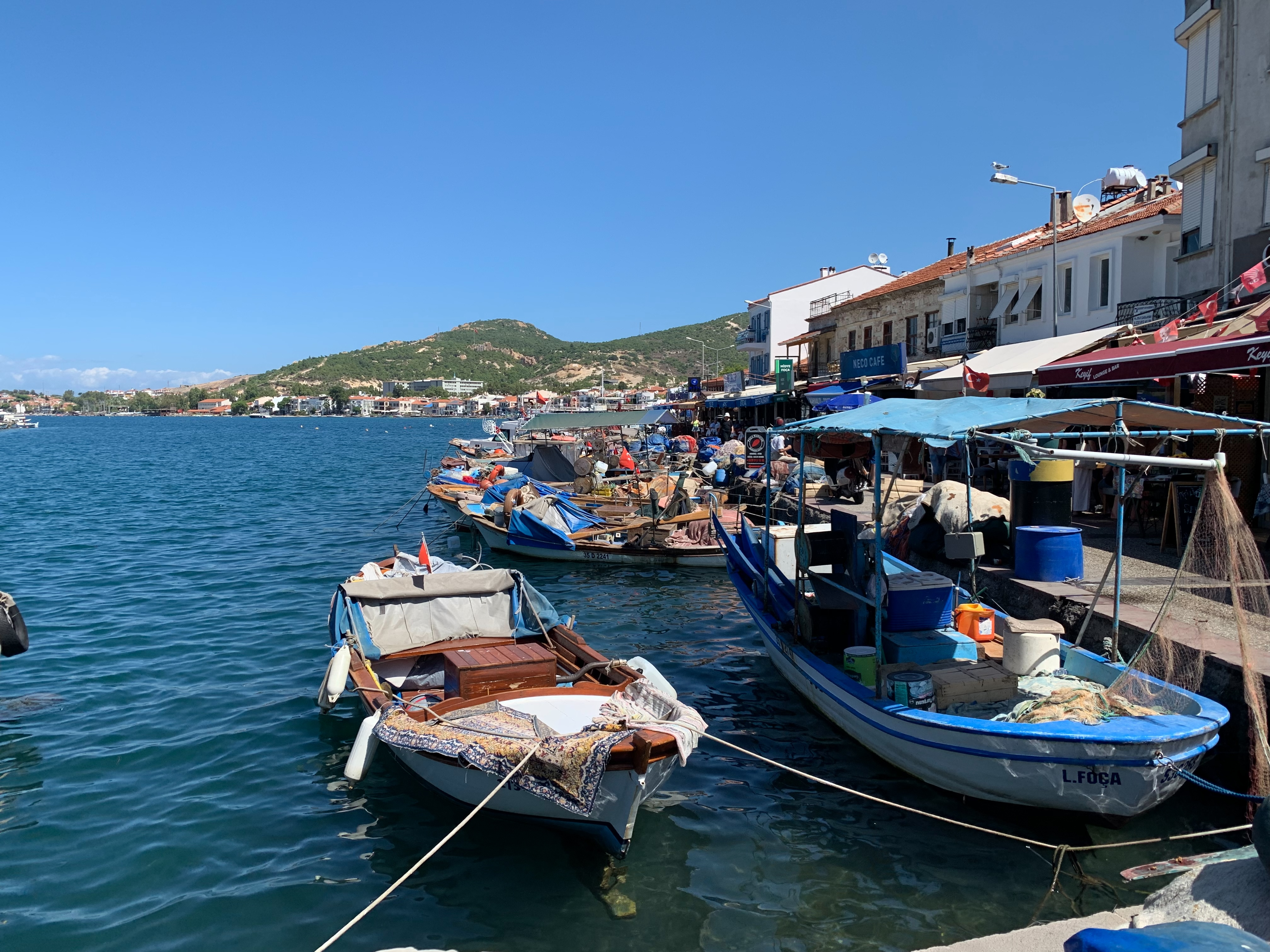

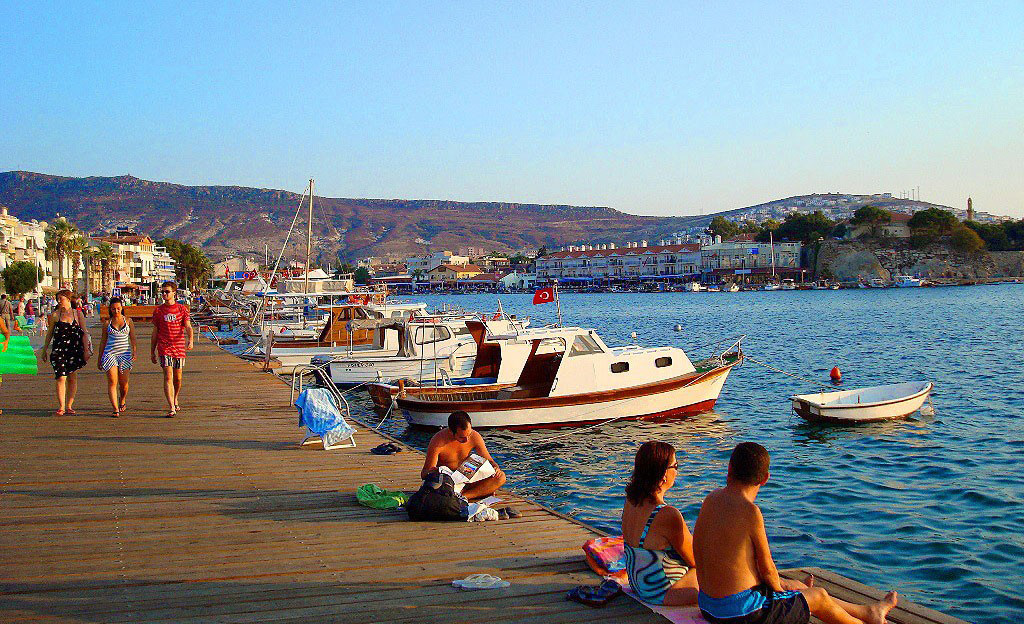

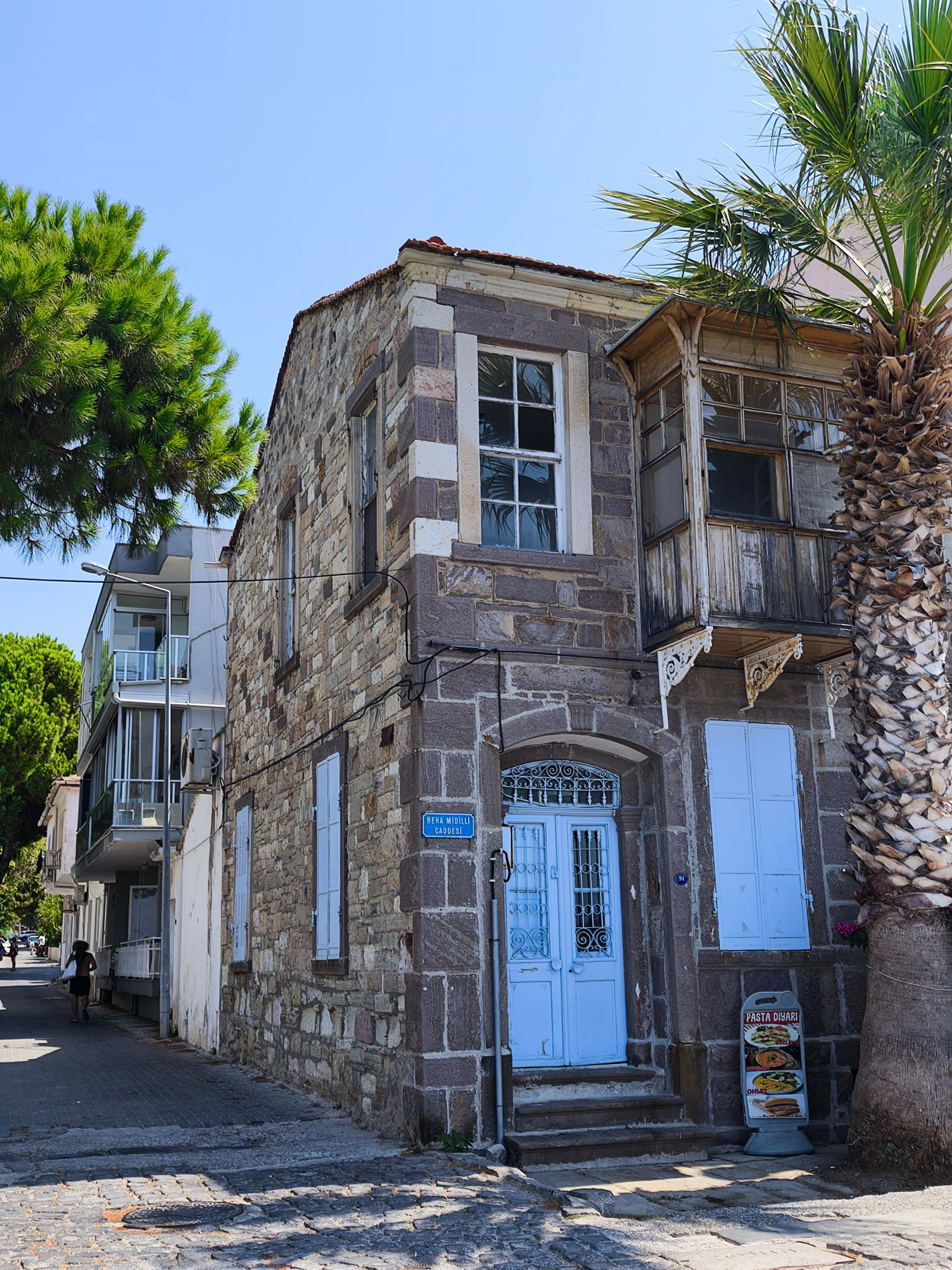

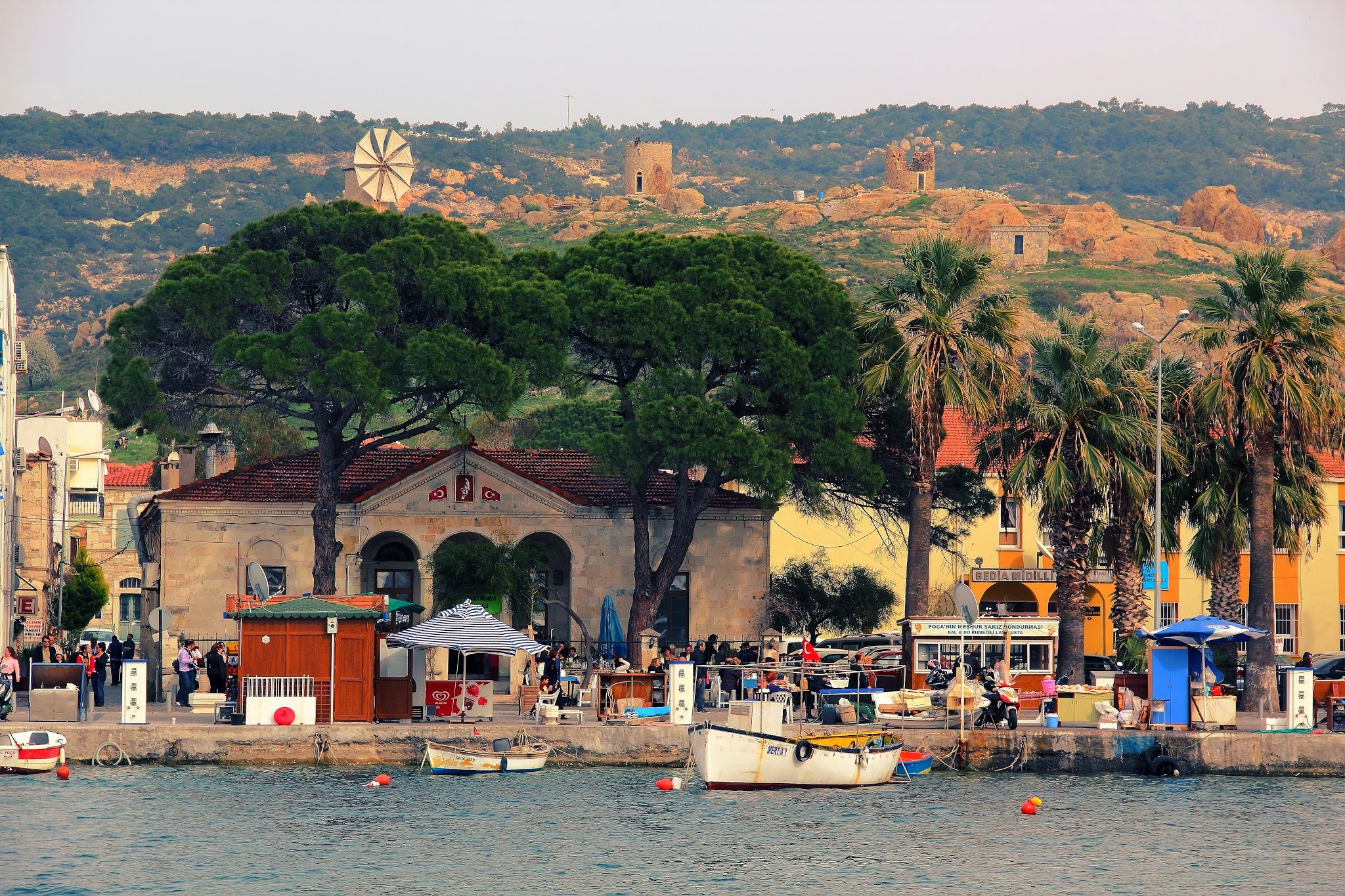

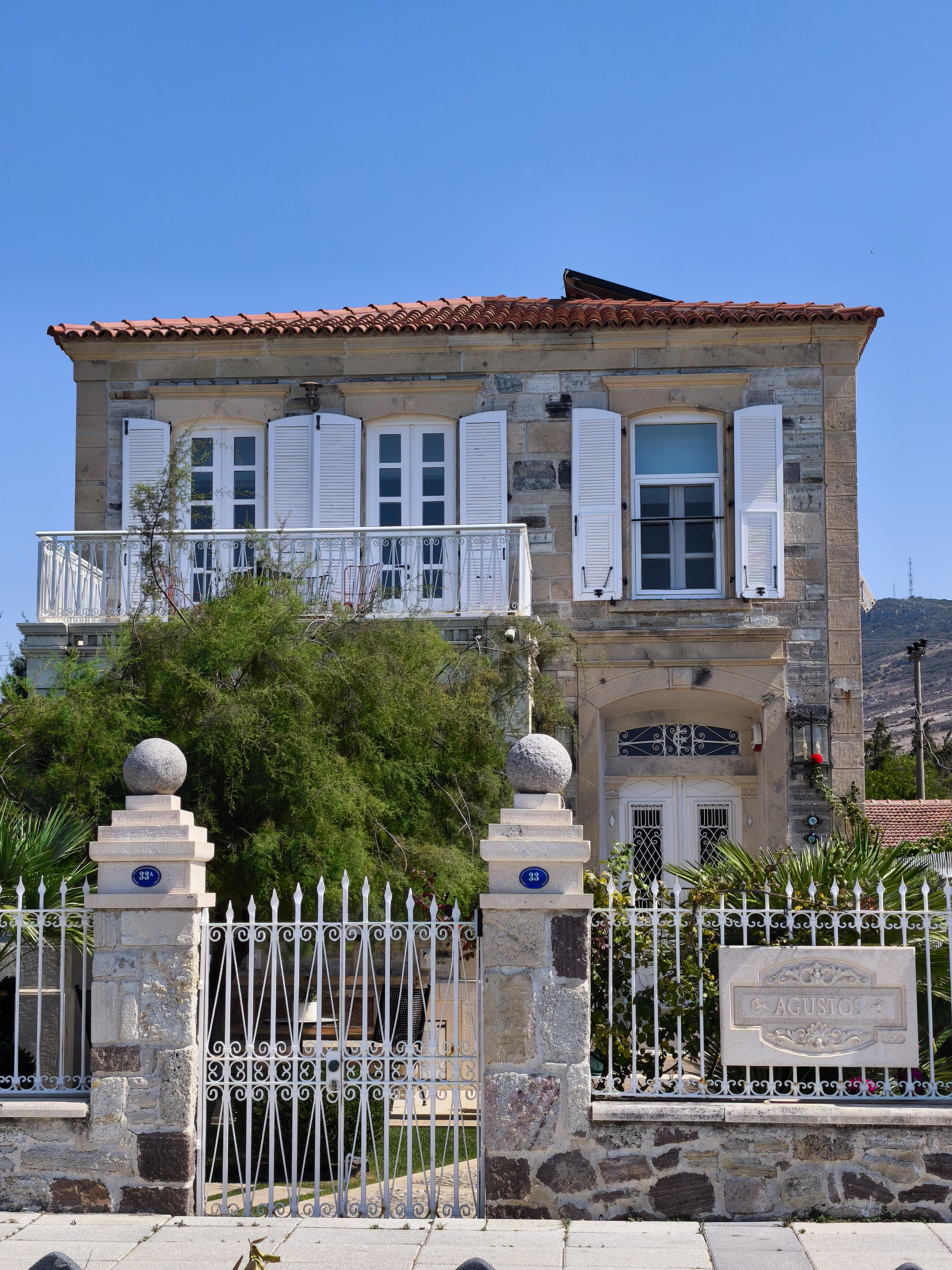

== Composition ==
There are 16 neighbourhoods in Foça District:

- Atatürk
- Cumhuriyet
- Fatih
- Fevziçakmak
- Fevzipaşa
- Hacıveli
- Ilıpınar
- İsmetpaşa
- Kazım Dirik
- Kemal Atatürk
- Kocamehmetler
- Kozbeyli
- Mareşal Fevzi Çakmak
- Markköy
- Mustafa Kemal Atatürk
- Yenibağarası
- Yeniköy

== Notable people ==
- Thestorides, ancient Greek cyclic poet and possible author of the epic poem Little Iliad
- Dionysius (5th century BC), ancient Greek admiral during the Greco-Persian Wars
- Aspasia (late 5th–early 4th century BC), ancient Greek wife of the Persian kings Cyrus the Younger and Artaxerxes II, and priestess of Anahita
- Yannis Tamtakos (1908–2008), Greek anarchist and political activist
- Sabri Yirmibeşoğlu (1928–2016), Turkish general, false flag operator, and self-admitted war criminal

== See also ==
- Foreign purchases of real estate in Turkey
- Turkish Riviera
