= Greek resistance during the Greek genocide =

Resistance movement against Turkish massacres

Pontic Greek guerilla fighters

The Greek resistance during the Greek genocide took part mostly in the Pontus region, where self-defense militia were formed to defend the local population from Turkish massacres during the Greek genocide.

The most notable local leaders were Anton Pasha, Kotza Anastas and Efkleidis Kourtidis, among others. The Pontic Greek resistance, in particular, is considered one of the most successful resistances in genocide history, as it was never militarily defeated or fully crushed by the regular Kemalist army.

== Resistance in Pontus ==
The Pontic Greeks made up the bulk of the genocide (see: Pontic Greek genocide) and the bulwark of the resistance. They lacked state protection and, as such, formed organized self-defense militia, similar to the defensive actions of Armenians and Assyrians during their respective genocides, primarily to protect civilian populations under systematic attack. They organized themselves in Bafra, Samsun, Amasya, Tokat, Erbaa and Santa.

=== Prelude ===
In the lead-up to World War I, Greek men from the ages of 19 to 45 were forcefully conscripted to the Ottoman Army. However, instead of being included in the regular army that would be trained in weaponry and deployed in the field, they were assigned to labour battalions, with the goal of exhausting them with 18-hour workdays with inadequate food and protection from the elements so they could not mount a much-feared resistance movement. The Ottomans began forcibly conscripting Pontic Greek men into labour battalions, where they died in large numbers, with the death rate reaching over 90%.

A British intelligence officer held hostage by the Turks estimated that "The life of a Greek in a labor gang is generally about two months". As such, the Young Turk regime solved two "problems" at once; they could move military material and do so by killing Pontic Greek men by indirect means, such as working them to death. The extermination of fighting-age males was central to the genocidal plans, as it eliminated a significant portion of the population capable of resistance.

=== Overture of the resistance (1914–1915) ===
Many Pontic Greek men successfully escaped or evaded these battalions, fleeing to the mountains. There, they formed resistance and self-defense groups to defend themselves and their people. The Turks actually caused the problem which they originally sought to prevent, marking the start of the Greek resistance in 1914.

In September 1915, the families of these escapees were deported from Pontus. This led to the rise of the resistance under Vasilios Anthopoulos.

=== Crescendo of the resistance (1916–1921) ===
Panagiotis Hatzitheodoridis (known as "Kapetan Aslan" lit. 'Captain Lion') and two of his men in Bafra (1919).

After 1916, when Ottoman forces began targeted destruction of Greek villages in Western Pontus, the resistance became more organized. Anthopoulos successfully created one of the earliest organized guerrilla bands in Sivas (Sebasteia), in July 1916, gathering around 10,000 volunteers and preparing for a revolt. Amasya was reported as ready to revolt as well.

In September 1916, Anthopoulos alongside 80 guerrillas moved through Turkish villages, and began killing known genocide perpetrators and burning their houses. This ultimately ended in a clash with Ottoman military forces near Ordu (Kotyora), after which Anthopoulos retreated with nine men to Russian-held Trabzon on 18 October.

In April 1917 a large force of the Turkish army was sent by Refet Bele Pasha and commanded by Mehmet Ali encircled the monastery of the Theotokos near the village of Otkaya (Otkayada), on the west side of Mount Neltes (Nebyan). There, a cave called "Cave of the Virgin Mary" was located, where 600–650 unarmed men, women and children were hiding, protected by 60 armed guerrillas. Turkish villagers informed the army of this hiding place, which was afterwards surrounded by 350 gendarmes under Dalip Çavuş. The guerrillas, however, successfully repelled all Turkish attacks for about a week, after which a regular army regiment equipped with artillery was brought in. After two further days of fighting, the defenders were running out of ammunition and the artillery had widened the cave entrance. Seeing that the situation was hopeless, the guerrillas raised a white flag and committed collective suicide, in hopes that the Turks spare the civilians. However, when the Turks entered the cave, they proceeded to rape the young girls and women, shoot the children, and behead the men. Only 83 of them survived the ordeal.

After the October Revolution in 1917, the Russian Army left Pontus. Under Chrysanthus, Pontic Greek villagers picked up the weapons left by the Russians. This led to the first clashes between armed Greek villages and Turkish irregulars. In December 1917, the Greek residents of Santa organized themselves militarily after attacks on Greek villages.

In 1918, after the Ottoman defeat in World War I, the guerrillas did not disarm and continued their resistance, despite British demands to surrender their weapons.

Mustafa Kemal's landing in Samsun in 19 May 1919 led to the final and most brutal phase of the genocide.

On the forefeast of the Dormition of the Theotokos, Bishop of Zile Euthymios Agritellis gathered some thousands of guerrillas outside of the small town of Çağşur (Esençay), under the command of Kyriakos Papadopoulos. The guerrillas attacked the town and captured it, killing 2,000 Turkish soldiers, gendarmes and çetes in the process.

In February/March 1920, Greek reserve lieutenant Chrysostomos Karaiskos went to Samsun (Amisos) in order to organize the guerrillas in the countryside. He went to Zile, in Tokat, and saw the guerrilla leaders were basically running the city and openly operated there. He observed band leaders entering and leaving the archbishopric openly, with Agritellis holding power over the region.

In the summer of the same year, the elite Pontic Greek captains fortified themselves in the Topçam Mountain, a prominent peak located within the inland section of the Pontic Mountains, and for seven years, the Turks, using regular troops, were unable to capture this strategically important region of Pontus.

Two Pontic Greek guerrilas

In May 1921, Topal Osman, one of the main perpetrators of the Pontic Greek genocide, was ordered to attack the guerrillas around Samsun, but repeatedly avoided the strongest guerrilla positions. It was noted that the Greek fighters were causing "serious problems" for Osman's forces. Osman was known for avoiding Greek fighters and, instead, choosing to attack Greek civilians. During the Samsun deportations in June 1921, approximately 600 guerrillas under leaders including Istyl Aga, Anastas Aga, Garafytos, Uzunfyto, Hatzikosti and Pantel Aga successfully protected some civilians who had taken refuge in the mountains, but failed to stop the deportations entirely.

After the Kemalist occupation of Santa in September 1921, approximately 300 women and children fled into the mountains. Around 100 guerrillas under Efkleidis Kourtidis sheltered and defended them at the Magara cave, where they were attacked by forces under Süleyman Kalfa, who demanded their surrender. Dimitrios Tsirip, Kourtidis' deputy, refused and was shot in the head. Seeing that his deputy had been killed, Kourtidis devised a plan: ten guerrillas each had a semi-automatic pistol with ten cartridges. When fired together, the pistols sounded as though a machine gun were firing. Kourtidis ordered the men to fire all ten pistols simultaneously in order to create the impression of a machine-gun attack and frighten the attackers into retreating.At the same time, two handmade grenades were thrown, intensifying the effect. Believing that they were under machine-gun fire, the Turkish force fled from the cave, allowing the guerrillas and the unarmed civilians to escape.

=== Finale of the resistance (1922–1924) ===
By early 1922, Pontic Greek civilians hiding in the mountains and protected by the guerrillas, who numbered up to 50,000, had begun dying due to food shortages. Meanwhile, the Turkish nationalists recognized that they could not crush the guerrillas, having difficulty bringing troops from other areas to Pontus, and instead decided to concentrate their forces against the Greek Army. With both sides recognizing the severity of their respective situations, the guerrillas of Topçam accepted a favorable ceasefire with the Turkish nationalists in March 1922. Under the terms of the ceasefire, the Turks agreed to provide food for the starving women and children, as well as for the guerrillas.

However, hostilities didn't stop entirely. In May 1922, the guerrillas achieved a victory in the Seventh Battle of Dazli, repelling a massive Turkish force which had been sent to attack the village.

After the Great Offensive in August 1922, the Turks broke the treaty and atrocities began anew in and near Topçam. Turkish forces came in the area with 40,000 soldiers in October 1922 and began burning villages and hunting down guerrillas and civilians. However, in 19 October 1922, governor Liva Pasha decided to give amnesty to the guerrillas, in hopes they surrender. Having been betrayed before, the Greeks refused to give up their weapons. In December 1922, guerrillas succeeded in protecting 5,000 families in the mountains.

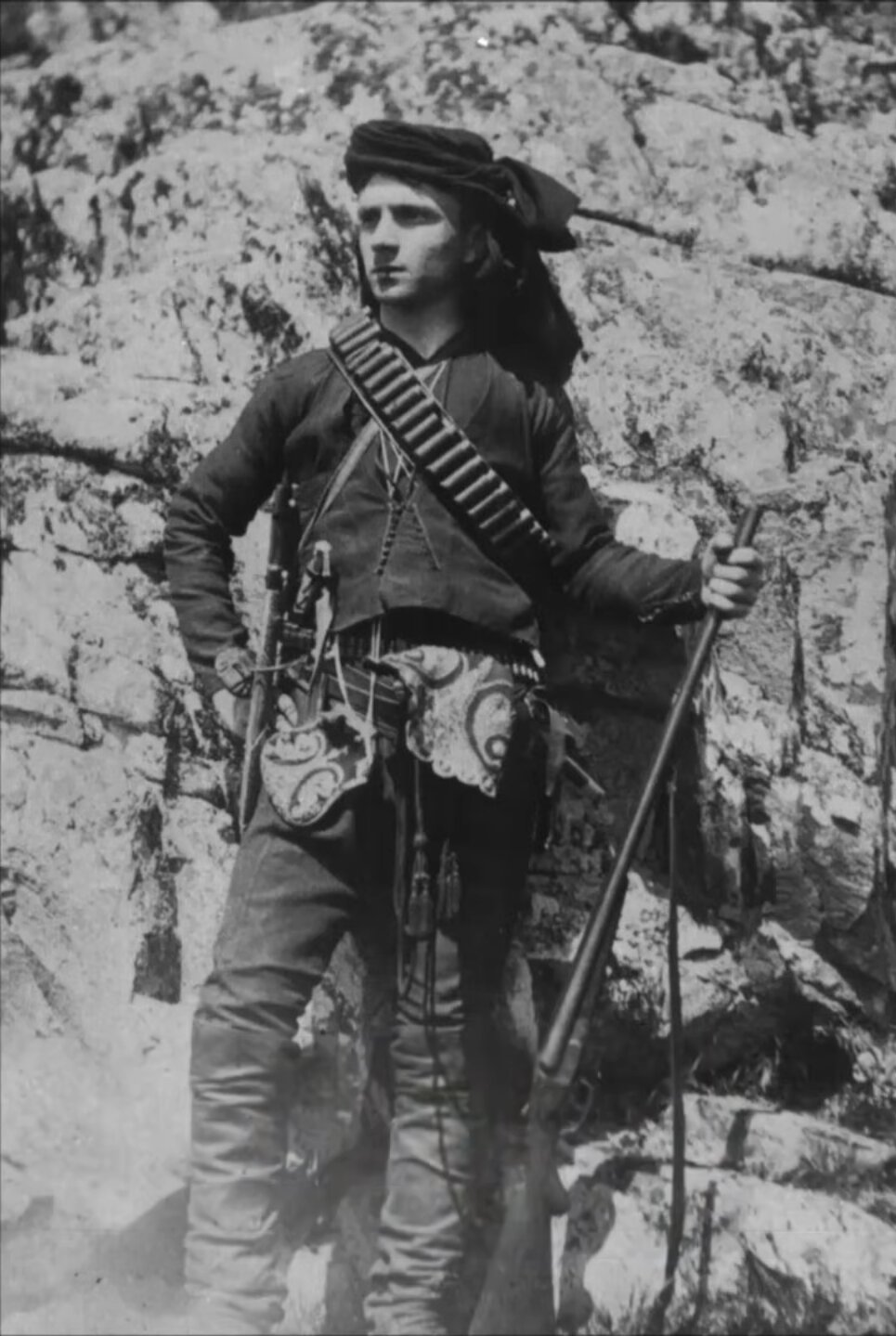
A Pontic Greek guerrilla on patrol

By 1923, when the vast majority of unarmed civilians had been finally evacuated in the port of Samsun, the guerrillas rented Turkish boats and sailed to Romania, Bulgaria and the Soviet Union. From there, they went to Greece on their own initiative. A few pockets of resistance remained, particularly in Santa. In January 1923, the guerrillas of Santa refused to leave and took to arms. After another amnesty and safety guarantees from both the Turkish and Greek governments, the vast majority of the last guerrillas, including Efkleidis Kourtidis, left in February 1924 as part of the Population exchange between Greece and Turkey.

The twilight of the resistance was finally written in December 1924. The final guerrilla, Eleni Çavuş (lit. Sergeant Eleni), a woman who had led a Pontic Greek guerrilla group since 1918, was surrounded by Turkish government forces in a cave in the Nebiyan mountains, near Bafra. Refusing to surrender, she fought for several days, eventually getting killed after exhausting her ammunition.

=== Strength ===
Most estimates give the number of Pontic Greek fighters at around 18,000 in their peak, divided in 300 teams, each commanded by one local leader. In a 24 January 1920 letter, two Pontic Greek notables, Christos Kalandides and Konstantinos Kansiz, wrote to the Hellenic Army General Staff that they could amass a total of 20,000 men. Subsequently, in a 24 June 1920 letter to Eleftherios Venizelos, during the Greek Summer Offensive, they also mentioned other Christians, such as the Lazes and the remaining Armenians, but also Muslims, such as the Circassians, the Alevis (also referred to as "Qizilbash") and others, all of whom they considered sympathetic to Greeks, as ready to take up arms against the Turks as well, since they, too, had been and were being oppressed.

According to Mustafa Kemal in Nutuk, the resistance began with 6,000–7,000 guerrillas and reached an estimated peak strength of 25,000 fighters, although his peak number is considered inflated and dubious. According to historian and political scientist Racho Donef, the "figure of 25,000 freedom fighters" was later manipulated by Turkish historiography, which turned it into "25,000 gangs" instead.

=== Weaknesses ===
The resistance's most significant weakness is considered to have been its lack of a unified command. Its lack of ammunition, food, medical supplies, clothing and other equipment was also evident. In 16 August 1919, Pontic Greek guerrilla leaders sent an appeal to the Greek Foreign Ministry, in which they stated that they were fighting "only with Mausers" (likely M1889, M1893 and/or M1903) and that even these were difficult to obtain from the Turks. In the appeal, they noted the movement's weaknesses and asked for help: They requested supplies of machine guns and other arms and ammunition. They also mentioned lack of food, clothing, medications and medical supplies and warned of food shortages toward the winter, asking for provisions within a month or so at the latest, before October. Lastly, they requested that two men be trained for military purposes, so that they could return and bring military experience and improve the military capabilities of the guerrillas; the training would be funded by parts of the resistance itself.

=== Organization, armament and conduct ===
The Pontic Greek resistance was self-defense oriented, structurally decentralized and made up mostly of village-based armed groups, although in its late stages it became loosely federated.

Initially, between 1914–1916, the Pontic Greek resistance consisted of different independent self-defense organizations, most of which were spontaneously created and unaware of each other. By late 1916 the guerrillas began a process of organizing themselves. The locals started forming clandestine organizations in their villages, creating executive committees, military councils and military training programs. Despite several attempts at creating a joint command headquarters, however, the guerrillas continued to operate autonomously. After 1917, with the Turkish authorities being increasingly unable to control them, the Pontic Greek guerrillas created "liberated zones" in the mountainous areas of Pontus and began establishing their own administrative and judicial structures.

Before 1916, the guerrillas were almost completely unarmed, carrying only pickaxes, knives, axes, or broken bayonets and very rarely firearms from clashes with Ottoman forces. In order to find money to purchase weapons, the families who took refuge in the mountains sold their possessions. In addition, some independently robbed rich Turkish merchants or stole and sold livestock. This enabled them to purchase modern weapons and ammunition from local smugglers, including Laz intermediaries.

From April 1916, following the Russian capture of Trabzon, the weapons and supplies of the guerrillas began coming mainly from Russia, including from Pontic Greeks in Russia and the Russian State. However, the amount of weapons and supplies received remained small.

The movement also received some weapons indirectly from Japan. In particular, Japan was directly supplying arms to Russia on the Caucasus Front, and some of these weapons were subsequently supplied to the Pontic Greek forces; three shipments from Trabzon totaled 442 Japanese rifles (likely Arisaka Type 30 and Arisaka Type 38) and a small amount of ammunition.

Despite Russian and Japanese military supplies, the resistance remained autonomous, decentralized and independent. After the Bolshevik Revolution in October 1917, the guerrillas were forced to act alone again and, as a result, reverted to acting locally. Pontic Greek villages became the main source of food and supplies, while weapons and ammunition were increasingly obtained by capturing them from the Turks.

The Circassians also had good relations with the fighters, supplying them with food and ammunition, as well as valuable information. However, when the Turks burned and destroyed those Pontic Greek and Circassian villages, the guerrillas began carrying out raids on Turkish villages, seizing the necessary food for themselves and for the women and children whom they were protecting. Although these robberies occurred for self-preservation, the guerrillas committed no atrocities against Turks or other Muslims.

=== Relations with non-Greeks ===
Habil Bey, a Circassian landowner from Bafra, sheltered 122 Greeks and paid for their escape by sea in 1921. He subsequently fled to Greece after the Turkish authorities began searching for him.

As noted above, the Pontic Greek guerrillas had good relations with their Circassian neighbours, who helped them, while also maintaining friendly relations with the Armenians, the Lazes and the Alevis.

Solidarity groups were formed between Greek and Circassian guerrillas; at least one Pontic Greek band is documented to have included Circassians and Armenians. Lazes are also recorded as having protected Greek civilians from Turkish atrocities, while also serving as smugglers for weaponry supplied to the resistance. In addition, Pontic Greek leaders saw the Alevis as potential allies, as they had suffered similar forms of oppression under the Turks and were seen as having "love and respect" for the Greeks. One account recalls how the Alevi inhabitants and dervishes of Ahmetbaba, Vezirköprü materially assisted the Pontic Greek guerrillas, supplying them with food, weapons, and, in at least one case, money, while also sheltering Greek civilians and guerrillas in their homes during the persecutions.

Relations between the Pontic Greek guerrillas and the Turkish population were generally hostile. Turkish villages consistently attacked Greek villages and, in the resistance's later phases, the guerrillas began raiding Turkish villages for food and other provisions. However, the relationship was not always adverse. As the guerrillas established liberated zones in which they ruled over, a degree of local accommodation developed with the neighbouring Turkish villages. For example, several compromises were reached in which Turkish villagers agreed to provide food for the guerrilla groups and for civilian refugees, which created a local modus vivendi between the two sides. The arrangements could nevertheless break down when broader political and military conditions changed. After Pontic Greek civilians who had been deported earlier began returning to their villages in 1918, conflicts with Turkish inhabitants resumed, partly because Turks refused to return property that had been taken from deported Greeks and Armenians.

=== Assessments ===
Those [Greeks] here, at least from what they have suffered, are willing to undergo any sacrifice, provided that someone cares for them. But the person who will truly care for them is the one who supplies them with weapons, because they have already learned that the Turk will respect their lives only when they have a weapon in their hands. Proof of this is that wherever there is even a single Greek guerrilla, the Turk trembles. And proof of this is that in the regions of Trebizond, Kerasounta, Ordu, etc., the Greeks are terrorized because they are unarmed, whereas here the Greeks [through their armed resistance] are the ones who strike terror into their oppressors.

— Report of Greek lieutenant Chrysostomos Karaiskos after arriving in Amisos (February/March 1920)

The Pontic Greek resistance is considered one of the most successful resistances in genocide history, never being militarily defeated or totally crushed by the regular Kemalist army.

Hasan Fehmi Ataç on 10 June 1922 noted that the Kemalist "deportations" of the Greeks in Pontus had not been as successful as the CUP "deportations" of the Armenians, due to the resistance. He reasoned:

When the Armenian deportation was carried out, the country was surrounded on all four sides by enormous armies, and since the Armenians did not know what deportation meant, that is, what it meant to remove a nation and transfer it from one country to another, and, more precisely, because they had never experienced it before, they immediately submitted, and it was implemented all at once. By the time the Council of Ministers decided upon the "Pontus issue", however, the Greeks had already armed themselves two years earlier and had prepared all sorts of means in the mountains and countryside; we were on the defensive. In other words, unlike the other deportations, we were not in a position to carry it out suddenly and all at once.

Ziya Hurşit agreed with Hasan Fehmi Ataç's assessment in 9 August 1922, writing that the government could not completely extinguish the resistance. In assessing the difficulty of suppressing it, Rauf Orbay compared the movement to the successful Irish War of Independence. He said in a 24 August 1922 speech:

It is difficult, gentlemen. In a large, steep, rocky and mountainous region, there is a population that has lost its property and honor and sees its life constantly in danger. And they have weapons in their hands. It is very difficult to kill them.

Turkish historian Sait Çetinoğlu wrote how:

The Pontos resistance is an exemplary form of resistance. Resistance is not limited to guerrilla warfare. As an instance of an all-out popular resistance, it is a unique example for oppressed and captive peoples and holds an important place in the history of resistance. The people resisted through their own resources, without receiving outside assistance. Moreover, despite the asymmetry of forces and the conditions of war, the resistance could not be crushed in Bafra and Santa. We can say that the Pontos people lost the war not because they were defeated, but because they lost it as a matter of realpolitik.

French scholar Michel Bruneau wrote that the "heroic resistance" in Pontus, particularly in Santa, represented a "model of freedom and affirmation of identity" that deserves a place in the memory of all Pontic Greeks. Historian Anthony Bryer went as far as to call them as "perhaps the most astonishing of all [the world's] survivors".

== Resistance in other parts of Anatolia ==
=== Western Anatolia ===
==== Smyrna ====
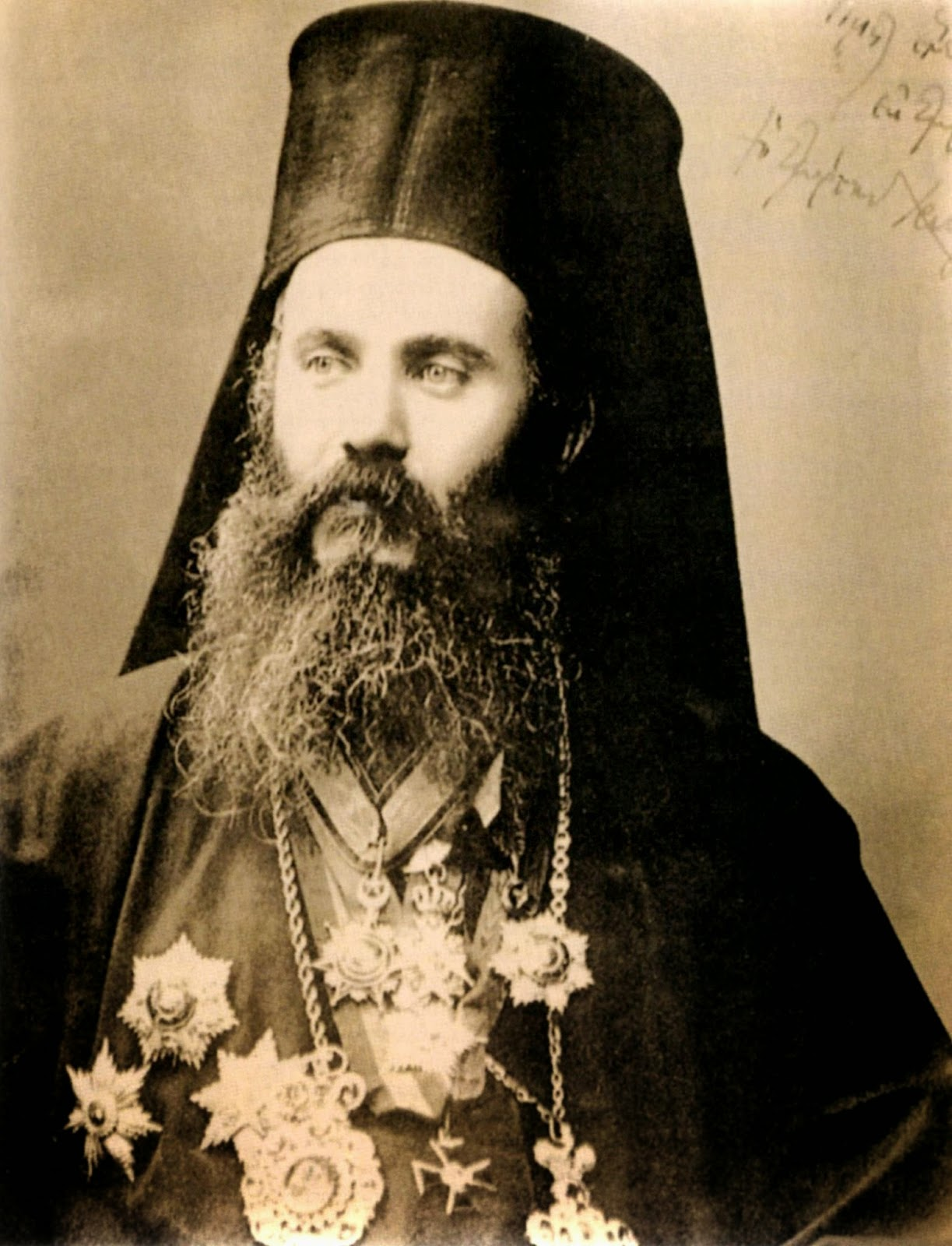
Saint Chrysostomos of Smyrna, one of the leaders and advocates of the Asia Minor Defense Organization

The Asia Minor Defense Organization was founded in 1921, in case the Greek campaign in Asia Minor proved to be a failure, as well as to protect the Ottoman Greeks of the region from Turkish atrocities, and to find a reasonable settlement to the question of the Smyrna Zone's fate. As the Greek front collapsed, the Organization "to buy and bear arms and to give arms to civil guards, [which] would greatly contribute to the rising of the morale of the Greeks for the protection of the lives of the citizens from the armed bands and the Turkish masses". However, Aristeidis Stergiadis did not allow this measure. A week before the Turkish capture of Smyrna, the Greek High Command decided to fully disarm the Greek population of the city, in order to avoid inter-ethnic conflict when the Turkish Army arrived, effectively destroying any chance for meaningful resistance. The New York Times reported that "Mr. Stergiadis, unwisely ordered the Christians in Smyrna to disarm themselves. Thus, putting them in harms' way and leaving them no defense against the armed Turkish citizenry of Smyrna". After the burning of Smyrna and the massacre of up to 180,000 Christians in the city, the 11 September 1922 revolutionary government indicted Stergiadis as partly responsible for the disaster.

Despite this, some marginal resistance emerged. After the Turkish capture of the city, the first Turkish officer to hoist the Turkish flag in Smyrna on the 9th of September, and his unit of thirteen cavalrymen were ambushed by a volley of fire by 30-40 rifles from a nearby factory. This volley of fire killed 3 cavalrymen instantly and fatally wounded another. In addition, a Turkish captain and a Turkish lieutenant were wounded by a grenade thrown by a Greek irregular. The lieutenant was wounded lightly in his nose.

==== Other parts of Western Anatolia ====
During the 1914 Greek deportations, Greek villagers organized an armed resistance in the village of Serekieuy (Sereköy), in Menemen. They fought, outnumbered and outgunned, against Ottoman bashibazouks for approximately four hours until the defenders exhausted their ammunition. They then fought the attackers hand-to-hand and were killed, with only a few survivors escaping to the city of Menemen.

Greeks, alongside Armenians and a few local anti-Nationalist Turks, organized a self-defense unit of 250 men to repel a Turkish Nationalist force consisting of 300 soldiers from entering the village of Basileia, Astakos (modern-day Bahçecik, a village in Başiskele), located in the surrounding areas of Nicomedia (İzmit). The resistance was successful and the Turkish Nationalist forces failed to capture the village, falling back.

Self-defense units were also organized by the Greeks, Armenians and a group of Circassians in two villages of Adapazarı (Sarı-Soğan and Çiftlik). A certain Avedis (probably Armenian) and a certain Stavri (probably Greek) were the leaders of these two self-defense units, with both leading a force of around 100 volunteers each.

=== Central Anatolia and underground cities ===
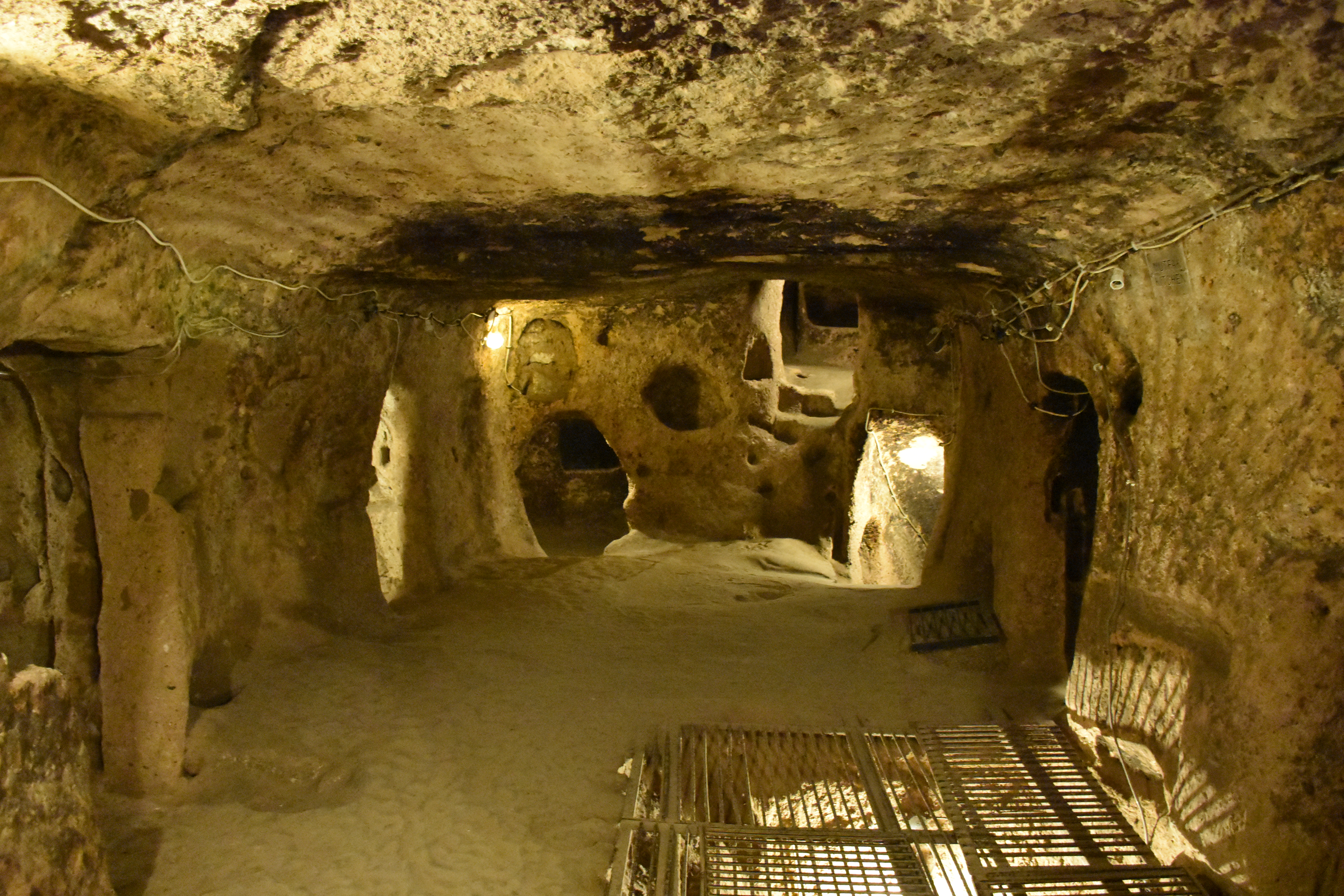
Kaymakli underground city, one of the main hiding places of Cappadocian Greeks during the Adana massacre.

Just a few years before the beginning of the Greek genocide, during the Adana massacres, Richard MacGillivray Dawkins, a Cambridge linguist who conducted research on the Cappodocian Greeks in the area from 1909–1911, recorded that Cappadocian Greeks were hiding from the Turks in the Kaymakli underground city and the Derinkuyu underground city:

when the news came of the recent massacres at Adana, a great part of the population at Axo took refuge in these underground chambers, and for some nights did not venture to sleep above ground.

During the genocide, Cappadocian Greek communities kept those underground cities as hiding grounds and as headquarters for self-defense operations. In the town of Misthi, inhabitants retreated underground when Turks arrived, while in Anaku and other Central Anatolian settlements, Greeks used sealed subterranean shelters against Turkish assaults and attacks. In Misthi, a secret underground passage was also used to rescue Greeks being transported inland as captives.

== Gallery ==
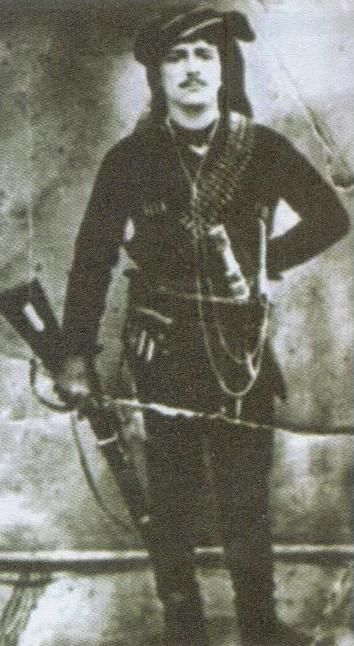
Antonis Hatzieleftheriou (Anton Pasha)

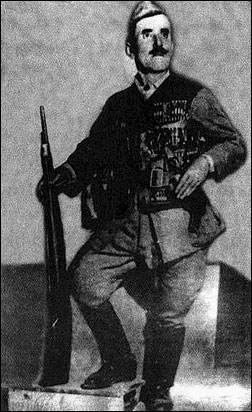
Anastasios Papadopoulos (Kotza Anastas)

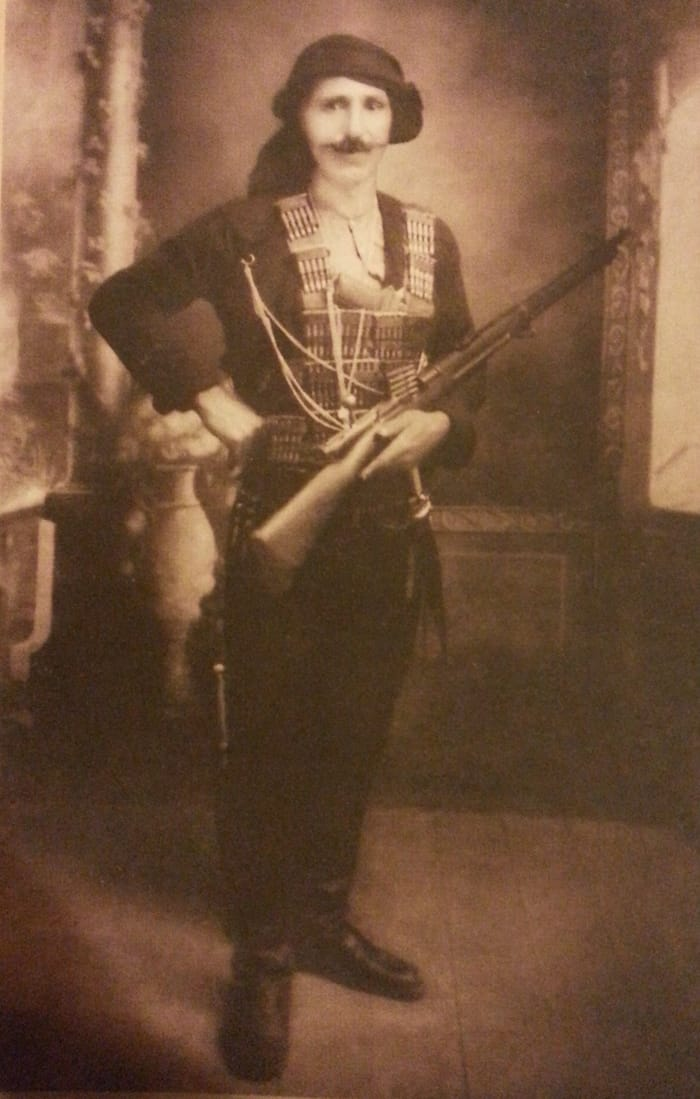
Efkleidis Kourtidis

Evangelos Ioannidis

Stylianos Kosmidis (Istyl Ağa)

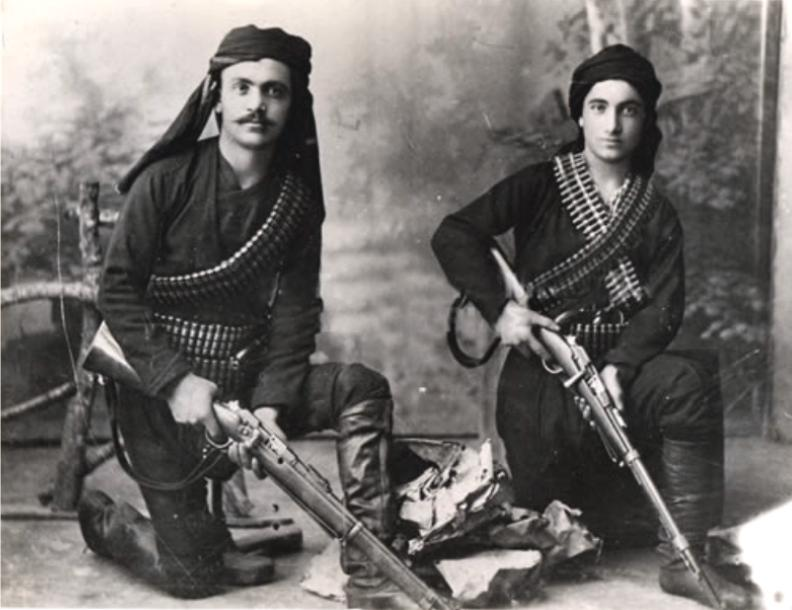
Pontic Greek fighters

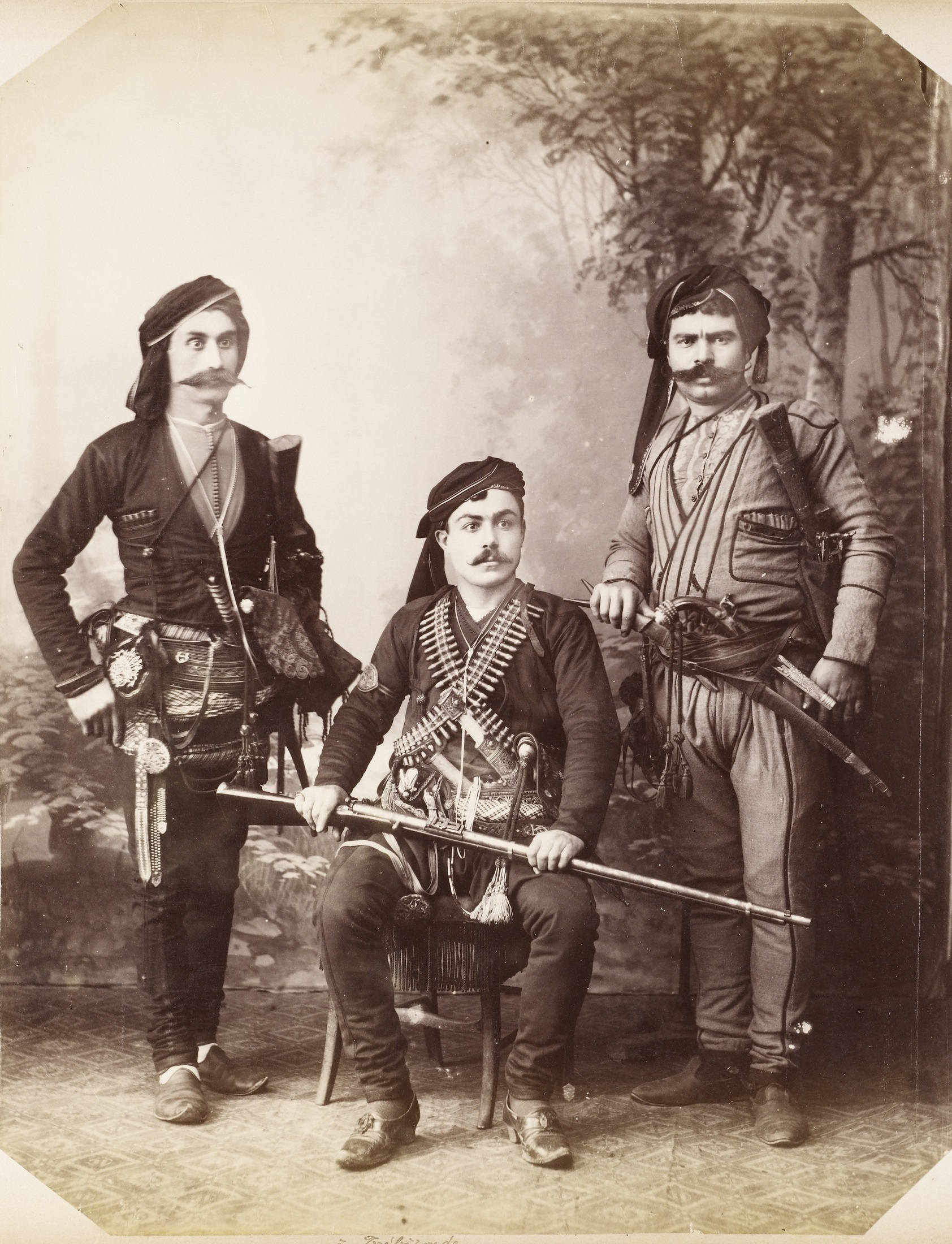
Pontic Greek fighters

Pontic Greeks

Pontic Greeks

Pontic Greek guerrilla

Pontic Greek fighter

Pontic Greek guerrillas

Armed Pontic Greeks

Pontic Greek guerrillas

Pontic Greek guerrillas

== See also ==
- Armenian resistance during the Armenian genocide

== Sources ==
- Academy of Athens (n.d.). "Ιστορικό Λεξικό των Ιδιωμάτων της Καππαδοκίας (ΙΛΙΚ)" (in Greek).
- Academy of Athens (n.d.). "Ιστορικό Λεξικό των Ιδιωμάτων της Καππαδοκίας (ΙΛΙΚ)" (in Greek).
- Akbulut, Uğur (2012). "Birinci Türkiye Büyük Millet Meclisi'nde Pontus tartışmaları". Atatürk Dergisi. 1 (1): 95–110.
- Akın, Rıdvan (2010). Türk Siyasal Tarihi, 1908–2000. İstanbul: On İki Levha Yayıncılık.
- Aksoy, Yaşar (2021). İstiklal Süvarisi - İzmir'in Kurtuluşu: Teğmen Ali Riza Akıncı'nın Hatıratı (in Turkish). İstanbul, Turkey: Kırmızı Kedi Yayınevi. pp. 103–109. ISBN 9786052988022.
- Alexandrou, Charalambos (2022). "Αντάρτικο των Ελλήνων του Πόντου: Δημιουργία, εξέλιξη και χαρακτηριστικά" (PDF). Η Σημερινή (in Greek).
- Alexiadis, Thomas (5 November 2017). Το αντάρτικο του Πόντου και η δράση των ανταρτών στον Πόντο. Πρώτο επιστημονικό συνέδριο για τον Πόντο. Drama.
- Anthemidis, Achilleas S. (1998). Τα απελευθερωτικά στρατεύματα του Ποντιακού Ελληνισμού 1912–1924. Thessaloniki: Ευστάθιος Γ. Τιαλτουρίδης.
- Aydın, Aybay (1999). "İzmir'in Kurtuluşu ve Yüzbaşı Şerafettin". Cumhuriyet (in Turkish). p. 2.
- Basso, Andrew (2016). "Towards a Theory of Displacement Atrocities: The Cherokee Trail of Tears, The Herero Genocide, and The Pontic Greek Genocide". Genocide Studies and Prevention. 10 (1): 5–29. doi:10.5038/1911-9933.10.1.1297. ISSN 1911-0359. S2CID 263168181.
- Bjørnlund, Matthias (2008). "The 1914 Cleansing of Aegean Greeks as a Case of Violent Turkification". Journal of Genocide Research. 10 (1): 41–58. doi:10.1080/14623520701850286.
- Bryer, Anthony (1968). "Nineteenth-century monuments in the city and vilayet of Trebizond: Architectural and historical notes. Part 2". Archeion Pontou. 29: 89–129.
- Bryer, Anthony (1991). "The Pontic Greeks before the Diaspora". Journal of Refugee Studies. 4 (4): 315–334. doi:10.1093/jrs/4.4.315.
- Bruneau, Michel (1995). "Lieux de mémoire, hauts lieux et diaspora : Sanda et Soumela dans la diaspora grecque pontique". L'Espace géographique. 24 (2): 124–134. doi:10.3406/spgeo.1995.3365.
- Çetinoğlu, Sait; Cibran, Dara (2007). Pontos Sorunu (in Turkish). Peyama Azadi.
- Çetinoğlu, Sait (2011). "Pontos Bağımsızlık Hareketi ve Pontos Soykırımı". Armenien Info (in Turkish). Archived from the original on 19 June 2012.
- Çetinoğlu, Sait (2017). "Pontos Soykırımı: Ekonomik Boykottan… Cinayet… Pogrom… Oradan Soykırıma Uzanan Geniş Bir Yelpazede Gerçekleşti" (in Turkish). ERT.
- Çilingir, Tamer (2014a). "Pontos Soykırımı Tarihinden: Bafra Meryemana Mağarası Katliamı: 517 Kadın ve Çocuk, 30 Partizan". Devrimci Karadeniz (in Turkish). Archived from the original on June 15, 2014.
- Çilingir, Tamer (2014b). "Kaptanların Kaptanı Anton Paşa". HyeTert (in Turkish).
- Çilingir, Tamer (2017). "Pontos'un Son Partizanı: Eleni Çavuş". ATİK Online.
- Çilingir, Tamer (2021). "Pontos Rum Soykırımı ve Asimilasyon (2. Bölüm)". Son Haber (in Turkish).
- Chalkidis, Georgios (2021). "Το Ποντιακό Ζήτημα: Η ανάγκη αποκατάστασης της ιστορικής μνήμης και η ανάδειξη ενός διαχρονικού ευρωπαϊκού – διεθνούς ζητήματος" [The Pontic Question: The Need to Restore Historical Memory and Highlight a Timeless European–International Issue] (PDF). Σχολή Εθνικής Άμυνας.
- Chrysostomidou, E. (2010). Ποντιακή Δημοκρατία: Το όραμα για την ίδρυσή της και η πορεία της [Pontian Republic: The Vision for Its Establishment and Its Course] (Thesis). Democritus University of Thrace.
- Dawkins, R. M. (1916). Modern Greek in Asia Minor: A Study of the Dialects of Sílli, Cappadocia and Pharása. Cambridge University Press. p. 16.
- Donef, Racho (2015). "The Pontian Genocide: The continuous cycle of violence and massacres". Armenian, Assyrian and Hellenic Genocide News (AAHGN).
- Drougos, A. (2022). "Η γενοκτονία των Ελλήνων του Πόντου" (PDF) (in Greek). Ελληνικό Ινστιτούτο Στρατηγικών Μελετών.
- Fotiadis, Konstantinos E. (2016). Η γενοκτονία των Ελλήνων του Πόντου [The Genocide of the Pontian Greeks]. Thessaloniki: Εκδοτικός Οίκος Αντ. Σταμούλη. ISBN 978-618-5161-50-7.
- Georganopoulos, Evripidis (2012). "Μεταξύ ελπίδας και καταστροφής: ο Πόντος κατά την τελευταία τραγική περίοδο (1908–1922)". Ελλήνων Ιστορικά (13). Athens: Ελεύθερος Τύπος: 33.
- Georganopoulos, Euripides (2025). "American Sources and the Genocide of the Pontic Greeks" (PDF). Journal of Modern Hellenism.
- Hür, Ayşe (20 May 2023). "Mustafa Kemal "Pontus Meselesi"ni nasıl "halletti?"". Avrupa Demokrat (in Turkish). Archived from the original on 18 May 2025.
- Hofmann, Tessa (2011). "Γενοκτονία εν Ροή – Cumulative Genocide". In Hofmann, Tessa; Bjørnlund, Matthias; Meichanetsidis, Vasileios (eds.). The Genocide of the Ottoman Greeks: Studies on the State-sponsored Campaign of Extermination of the Christians of Asia Minor, 1912–1922 and Its Aftermath: History, Law, Memory. Aristide D. Caratzas. p. 49. ISBN 978-0-89241-615-8.
- Ioakeimidis, Savvas P. (1957). "Πόντιοι Έλληνες Ρωμιοί και Λαζοί". Ποντιακή Εστία.
- Kalandides, Christos; Kansiz, Konstantinos (1920a). "Υπόμνημα των Χ. Καλαντίδη και Κ. Κανσήζ προς το Γενικό Ελληνικό Στρατηγείο σχετικά με το ενδεχόμενο εκδήλωσης κινήματος των Ποντίων εναντίον του τουρκικού κράτους". Eleftherios Venizelos Archive. Benaki Museum.
- Kalandides, Christos; Kansiz, Konstantinos (1920b). "Υπόμνημα προς τον Ε. Βενιζέλο σχετικά με το ενδεχόμενο εκδήλωσης κινήματος των Ποντίων κατά του Κεμάλ". Eleftherios Venizelos Archive. Benaki Museum.
- Karavangelis, Germanos (1959). Ο Μακεδονικός Αγών: Απομνημονεύματα. Αρχείον Μακεδονικού Αγώνος Πηνελόπης Δέλτα. Thessaloniki: Εταιρεία Μακεδονικών Σπουδών; Ίδρυμα Μελετών Χερσονήσου του Αίμου.
- Karkaletsis, Stavros (2013). "Ομιλία με θέμα: «Το Ποντιακό αντάρτικο και η Γενοκτονία»" [Speech on the subject: "The Pontic guerrilla movement and the Genocide"]. The Panhellenic Post.
- Kelly, Michael J. (2021). "Shared Intent in a Collapsing Empire: Pan-Turkism as Mens Rea Evidence of Genocide against Distinct Populations in the Late Ottoman Period". Transnational Law & Contemporary Problems. 30 (1): 29–62.
- Kontogiannis, Pantelis M. (1921). Γεωγραφία της Μικράς Ασίας. Athens: Σύλλογος προς Διάδοσιν Ωφελίμων Βιβλίων.
- Kostos, Sofia K.; Papazian, Dennis R. (2010). Before the Silence: Archival News Reports of the Christian Holocaust that Begs to be Remembered. Gorgias Press. p. 296. ISBN 978-1-60724-999-3.
- Kritikakos, Themistocles (2026). "The Late Ottoman Genocides: Historical Context, Academic Debates, and Legacy". Armenian, Greek, and Assyrian Genocide Recognition in Twenty-First Century Australia. Cham: Springer Nature Switzerland. pp. 23–64. doi:10.1007/978-3-032-08500-9_2. ISBN 978-3-032-08499-6.
- Liakos, Antonis; Doumanis, Nicholas (2023). "The wider Greek world I: The end of the age of empire". In Gallant, Thomas W. (ed.). The Edinburgh History of the Greeks, 20th and Early 21st Centuries: Global Perspectives. Edinburgh University Press. pp. 62–105.
- Lymperopoulos, Loukas (2020). Die Pontosgriechen – in Geschichte und Gegenwart. Hamburg: Landeszentrale für politische Bildung Hamburg.
- Morris, Benny; Ze'evi, Dror (2019). The thirty-year genocide: Turkey's destruction of its Christian minorities, 1894–1924. Cambridge (Mass.): Harvard University Press. ISBN 978-0-674-91645-6.
- Mousikidis, Zacharias (1957). "Αφήγηση γεγονότων του Ζαχαρία Μουσικίδη". Pontiaki Estia (88).
- Orthodoxia News Agency (2 May 2019). "Το Μιστί της Καππαδοκίας" (in Greek).
- Özsoy, İskender (15 November 2015). "Karadeniz'in saklı tarihinden bir özel sayfa: Sürgün yollarını dostlukla aştılar". Evrensel (in Turkish).
- Psathas, Dimitris (1966). Γη του Πόντου (in Greek). Αθήνα: Εκδόσεις Μαρία Δ. Ψαθά.
- Şekeryan, Ari (2017). "Reactions of the Armenian Community to the Emergence of the Turkish National Movement (1919–20)". Journal of the Ottoman and Turkish Studies Association. 4 (2): 381–401. doi:10.2979/jottturstuass.4.2.08.
- Sidiropoulos, Vasileios (22 August 2020). "Μια ιστορία ξεριζωμού από τον δυτικό Πόντο". Istorima Archive.
- Smith, Michael Llewellyn (1998). Ionian Vision: Greece in Asia Minor, 1919–1922. Ann Arbor: University of Michigan Press. p. 239. ISBN 0472109901.
- Yerasimos, Stéphane (1989). "La question du Pont-Euxin (1912-1923)". Guerres mondiales et conflits contemporains (153). Presses Universitaires de France: 9–34.
