= Russian Army (disambiguation) =

Russian Army may refer to:

- Russian Armed Forces
- Russian Ground Forces
- Army of the Tsardom of Russia
  - Army of Peter the Great
- Imperial Russian Army, the army of the Russian Empire
- Russian Army (1917), Russian army in the interim period between the fall of the Russian Empire and the Bolshevik revolution
- Russian Army (1919), White Army during the Russian Civil War under command of Admiral Kolchak
- Russian Army (1920), White Army during the Russian Civil War under command of Pyotr Wrangel
- Red Army, the army of Soviet Russia and Soviet Union
- Russian Liberation Army

== See also ==
- Russian Army Choir
- Russian Caucasus Army (disambiguation)
- Miss Russian Army
- List of Imperial Russian Army formations and units 1914
