= Ivan Savvidi =

Russian-Greek businessman

Ivan Savvidis
- ივან სავვიდისი; Иван Саввидис; Ιβάν Σαββίδης
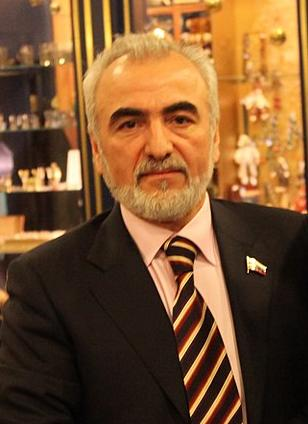
- Ivan Savvidis in 2010

Deputy of the State Duma

Fifth Convocation
- In office 2 December 2007 – 4 December 2011
- Constituency: Rostov

Fourth Convocation
- In office 7 December 2003 – 2 December 2007
- Constituency: Rostov

Personal details
- Born: 27 March 1959 (age 67) Santa, Tsalka District, Georgian SSR, Soviet Union
- Party: United Russia
- Education: Rostov State University of Economics, Rostov-on-Don
- Occupation: Owner of PAOK FC; Founder & Owner of Agrokom Group; Chairman of CJSC Donskoy Tabak; Owner of Dimera Group Ltd; Owner of Dimera Media Investments; Owner of Belterra Investments Ltd; Owner of Open TV
- Website: http://www.savvidi.ru/

Ivan Ignatyevich Savvidi (Russian: Иван Игнатьевич Саввиди, IPA: [ɪˈvan ɨɡˈnatʲjɪvʲɪtɕ sɐˈvʲidʲɪ]; born 27 March 1959), also known as Ivan Savvidis (Greek: Ιβάν Σαββίδης, romanized: Iván Savvídis, IPA: [iˈvan saˈviðis]; Georgian: ივან ეგნატეს ძე სავიდი, romanized: ivan egnat'es dze savidi, IPA: [ivan eɡnates dze savidi]), is a Russian-Greek businessman. He is one of Russia's wealthiest men ("Russian oligarch") and was a member of the Russian Parliament, closely linked to the President Vladimir Putin. According to Forbes, his fortune is estimated to $1.4 billion.

== Biography ==
Ivan Savvidi was born on March 27, 1959, in the village of Santa, Tsalka District, in what was then the Georgian Soviet Socialist Republic. His parents, Ignatios and Kleoniki, were Pontic Greek workers originating from Santa (present-day Turkey), who had 8 children, including Ivan. He was brought up as a Christian Orthodox, taught Greek history, and until the age of 7 spoke only Pontic Greek. At the age of 14 he settled in Rostov-on-Don where he finished high school. He served his military service and was discharged with the rank of sergeant. At the end of his military service he found work at the Don State Tobacco Factory. At the same time, in 1984 he began studying at the Logistics Department of the Rostov Institute of National Economy, from which he graduated in 1988.

With the collapse of the Soviet Union in 1991, Savvidi joined the stream of Pontic Greek fleeing to Greece.

After spending some time in the village of Megali Vrysi in Kilkis where his sister lived, trying to encourage Greeks in the area to invest together in the private economy that was shaping the former Soviet Union, he returned to Rostov and his old job. After some time of successful work, the management decided to promote Savvidi, appointing him deputy director. In 1993, was elected by workers as general director of the Donskoy Tabak company. The same year, during the privatisation process, "OJSC Donskoy Tabak" was established. Savvidi became the main shareholder of the company (with a 75.71% stake) and its chairman.

In 2013, Forbes listed Savvidis as the 30th wealthiest Russian businessman in the world. In 2013 he purchased 82% of the Greek tobacco company SEKAP.

In 2017 he acquired 19% of Mega Channel but some months later he sold it. In 2017 his Dimera Media company acquired the Pegasus Publications, which includes the newspapers of Ethnos and Imerisia. On 11 August of the same year, he bought the E Channel from businessman Philipos Vryonis and the market agreement was ratified on 21 August 2017.

In March 2018, he sold the OJSC Donskoy Tabak, together with his shares of SEKAP, to Japan Tobacco for $1.6 billion.

In February 2024 the High Anti-Corruption Court of Ukraine decided, following a request by the Ukrainian Justice Ministry, to seize the assets of both Ivan Savvidi and wife Kyriaki in the country due to his continued support for Russia's war effort in Ukraine. According to media sources, Savvidi's support dates back to 2014 and has been steady and long-standing. The confiscated assets include all of the shares of "PentoPak", a private joint stock company involved in polyamide food packaging, and all of the authorized capital of the Ukrainian subsidiary of food-packaging company "Atlantis-Pak". The State Property Fund of Ukraine proceeded in May 2024 to an electronic auction of the "PentoPak" company. According to the SPFU, this is the first case of the sale of a sanctioned plant. Its starting price was more than 203 million hryvnia (about €4.5 million).

=== Real estate ===
In February 2013, Savvidi took over the management of the Macedonia Palace in Thessaloniki.

He has also acquired a number of historic villas of Thessaloniki (such as the Longos mansion, Villa Zardinidi etc.), while his recent investment in Porto Carras reached €500 million.

== Political career ==
Savvidis was elected to the Legislative Assembly of Rostov Oblast in 1998 and 2003. In 2003, Savvidis was elected as a Deputy in the State Duma; he subsequently served as the Deputy Chairman of the Budget Committee and Taxes. In 2007, Savvidis was re-elected as a Deputy in the State Duma as a member of the party United Russia led by chairman Vladimir Putin, serving until 2011. He served as a member of the Committee International Affairs, as coordinator of Interparliamentary Relations with the Hellenic Parliament and as Deputy Chairman of the Foreign Affairs Committee of the Parliamentary Assembly of the Russia-Belarusian Union.

He has previously made positive comments about the Greek political party Syriza and has likened Alexis Tsipras to Vladimir Putin.

== Sports ==
Between July 2002 and July 2005, Savvidis was President of FC Rostov.

On 10 August 2012, he acquired ownership of the Greek football team PAOK and entered the Forbes list of the richest people in the world.

In 2015 Savvidis paid all of the club's debts to the Greek State, an amount that totalled at €10,886,811. After his exit from the tax office he stated: "I had a cup of tea that cost me €10.8 million."

Under his presidency, PAOK FC has won two Super League championships.

== Controversies ==
=== Gun demonstration ===
Ivan Savvidis was the focus of global attention on the evening of March 11, 2018, when he entered the stadium during the PAOK - AEK Athens championship match, which was a pivotal moment in the 2017–2018 season. At the time, the match was tied at 0-0, and at the 90-minute mark, PAOK's Fernando Varela scored the decisive goal with a header. The referee initially allowed the goal to PAOK, but a few minutes later, at the suggestion of the linesman and following protests from the AEK players, he disallowed the goal for offside. The overturning of the goal sparked a huge uproar both in the stands and inside the stadium, with players from both teams storming the pitch. Among them was Ivan Savvidis, who, accompanied by his bodyguards, ordered the PAOK players to leave the stadium. Ivan Savvidis appeared with a revolver strapped to his hip. The referee and the AEK players headed to the locker room when they saw Savvidis with the handgun in his belt and the game was stopped.
The pistol was photographed by the mobile phones of AEK's officials and was soon released on the internet. Although the pistol did not come out of its holster, the spectacle of the gun-toting businessman storming the stadium was the subject of negative commentary worldwide.

Savvidis was initially sentenced to 25 months' imprisonment, suspended for three years, after being found guilty of illegal entry into the stadium and possession of weapons. Apart from the criminal aspect, the sports justice system had punished the PAOK FC president with a three-year stadium ban and a fine of 100,000 euros. The sentence handed down by the appeal court was reduced to eight months, with a three-year suspension. The businessman was found guilty only for the accusation of "possession, with intent, of an object that may cause bodily harm during a sporting event".

=== Allegations of joint ownership ===
His rivalry with Evangelos Marinakis, owner of Olympiacos F.C., is particularly bitter; their rivalry, combined with their respective spending power, far superior to that of other Greek football clubs, is seen by analysts as one of the causes of the sport's problems in the country. In 2019, a television channel controlled by Marinakis broadcast an investigation accusing Savvidis of using figureheads to acquire ownership of another Super League team, Xanthi F.C., in violation of FIFA regulations governing professional leagues. An independent, government-appointed commission of inquiry was tasked with investigating the allegations: in 2020, after completing its investigations, the commission decided that the two clubs should be punished with relegation.
In Thessaloniki, there was an immediate outcry against this hypothesis, accusing the institutions of favoring Olympiakos; in the face of this and protests from certain political circles, the government tabled an amendment to the law stipulating as a penalty for such cases of multiple ownership the deduction of 5 to 10 points.

The case reached the Court of Arbitration for Sport (CAS), which referred it to the Appeals Committee for a new hearing on the merits. In 2021, the Appeals Committee of the EPO cleared PAOK FC of all charges.

== Personal life and community service ==
Savvidis is President of the Federation of Greek Communities of Russia, and was a key figure in pushing for the newly created region by the World Council of Hellenes Abroad in the Black Sea countries.

In 2022, during the Russian invasion of Ukraine, Savvidis ordered his associates to prepare around 487 rooms available at the Porto Carras resort in Chalkidiki within northern Greece in order to host refugees of the country during this time.

He is married to Kyriaki Savvidi and has two sons, George (Giorgi) and Nick (Nikolai).

== Awards ==
=== State ===
- Order "For Merit to the Fatherland" IV degree (21 February 2008) – for achievements in legislative activity, strengthening of Russian statehood and the development of Rostov-on-Don
- Order of Honour (13 December 2003) – for labor achievements and many years of diligent work
- Order "For Merit to the Fatherland" II degree (6 September 1999) – for his contribution to the socio-economic development of the city of Rostov-on-Don, and in connection with its 250th anniversary

=== Church ===
- Order of Holy Prince Daniel of Moscow II degree (2009)
- Order of Saint Seraphim of Sarov III degree (2011)
- Orthodox Knight of the Holy Sepulchre by the Patriarchate of Jerusalem

=== Public organizations ===
- Medal "Patron of the Year" – for the revival of Russian culture and the Rostov-on-Don region (1999–2009)
