= Arzularkabaköy =

- Municipality
- Location in Turkey
- Coordinates: 40°25′2″N 39°39′57″E
- Country: Turkey
- Province: Gümüşhane
- District: Gümüşhane
- Population (2022): 5,280
- Time zone: UTC+3 (TRT)

Arzularkabaköy is a town (belde) in the Gümüşhane District, Gümüşhane Province, Turkey. Its population is 5,280 (2022).
