= Caucasian Front electoral district =

Constituency of the Russian Republic

The Caucasian Front electoral district (Russian: избирательном округе Кавказского фронта) was a constituency created for the 1917 Russian Constituent Assembly election. The electoral district covered the Caucasian Front of the Russian Army. Moreover, it included the Urmia-Van Flotilla.

The Socialist-Revolutionaries dominated the soldiers soviets in the Caucasian Front. They used their dominance of the soviets to campaign for national defence and against the Bolsheviks' 'peace now' line. In several locations, the SRs excluded the Bolsheviks from local electoral committees. However, whilst the Caucasian Front soldiers supported the defencists line of the SR in the election, they nevertheless 'voted with their feet' and deserted the army en masse.

== Results ==
The SRs won a landslide victory in the constituency. The Soviet historian L. M. Spirin's account of the election result only gives a rough estimate, with 360,000 votes for the Socialist-Revolutionaries and 60,000 votes for the Bolsheviks. The account of U.S. historian Oliver Henry Radkey only includes votes from Erzerum fortress, with 16,824 votes. However, the Ukrainian vote in Erzerum was missing in the source material available to Radkey.

Caucasian Front: Erzerum Fortress
Party	Vote	%
Socialist-Revolutionaries	6,537	38.86
Bolsheviks	6,211	36.92
Armenian Revolutionary Federation	1,948	11.58
Mensheviks	1,113	6.62
Kadets	357	2.12
Georgians	51	0.30
Unaccounted	607	3.61
Total:	16,824	

Deputies Elected
Berezov	SR
Donskoy	SR
Mikhailov	SR
Pyzhev	SR
Tumanov	SR
Badaev	Bolshevik
