= Gümüşhane District =

District of Gümüşhane Province, Turkey

- District
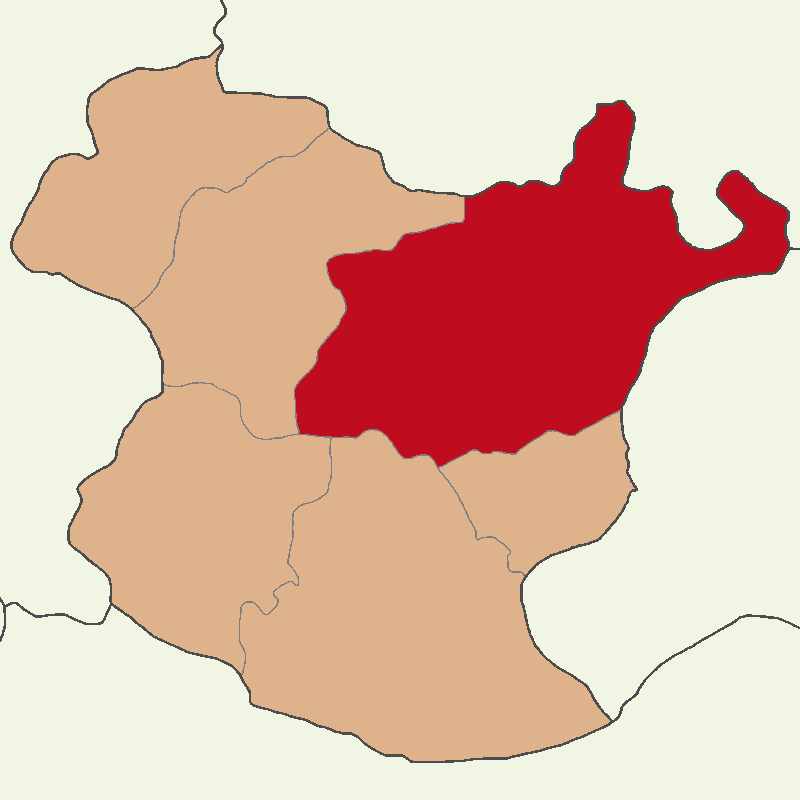
- Map showing Gümüşhane District in Gümüşhane Province

- Location in Turkey
- Coordinates: 40°28′N 39°37′E
- Country: Turkey
- Province: Gümüşhane
- Seat: Gümüşhane
- Area: 1,889 km^{2} (729 sq mi)
- Population (2022): 54,462
  - Density: 29/km^{2} (75/sq mi)
- Time zone: UTC+3 (TRT)

Gümüşhane District (also: Merkez, meaning "central" in Turkish) is a district of the Gümüşhane Province of Turkey. Its seat is the town of Gümüşhane. Its area is 1,889 km^{2}, and its population is 54,462 (2022).

== Composition ==
There are two municipalities in Gümüşhane District:

- Arzularkabaköy
- Gümüşhane

There are 92 villages in Gümüşhane District:

- Akçahisar
- Akgedik
- Akhisar
- Akocak
- Akpınar
- Aksu
- Aktutan
- Alçakdere
- Alemdar
- Ardıç
- Arslanca
- Aşağı Yuvalı
- Aşağıalıçlı
- Avşarbeyli
- Bahçecik
- Ballıca
- Bandırlak
- Beşoba
- Beyçam
- Boğalı
- Boyluca
- Çalık
- Çaltılı
- Çamlı
- Çayırardı
- Çorak
- Demirkaynak
- Demirören
- Dibekli
- Dölek
- Dörtkonak
- Düğünyazı
- Dumanlı
- Duymadık
- Erdemler
- Esenler
- Esenyurt
- Geçitköy
- Gökçepınar
- Gökdere
- Gözeler
- Gümüşkaya
- Güngören
- Güvercinlik
- Harmancık
- Hasköy
- İkisu
- İkiz
- Incesu
- Kale
- Kaletaş
- Karamustafa
- Kayabaşı
- Kazantaş
- Keçikaya
- Kılıçören
- Kırıklı
- Kızılca
- Kocapınar
- Kocayokuş
- Kurtoğlu
- Mescitli
- Nazlıçayır
- Olucak
- Olukdere
- Örenler
- Övündü
- Pehlivantaşı
- Pirahmet
- Şaphane
- Sargınkaya
- Sarıçiçek
- Söğütağıl
- Süle
- Süngübayır
- Sungurbeyli
- Tamzı
- Tandırlık
- Tekke
- Üçkol
- Yağlıdere
- Yağmurdere
- Yaydemir
- Yayladere
- Yenice
- Yeniköy
- Yeniyol
- Yeşildere
- Yeşilyurt
- Yitirmez
- Yukarı Alıçlı
- Yukarı Yuvalı
