= Russian Caucasus Army =

Caucasus Army (also Caucasian Army) or Russian Caucasus Army (also Russian Caucasian Army) can refer to several military formations:

== Imperial Russian military formations ==
- Russian Caucasus Forces (before 1865), a variety of formations with various names including (in 1857–1865) Caucasus Army
- Caucasus Military District, the successor organization to this army
- Russian Caucasus Army (World War I), the Russian army on the Caucasus front in World War I (July 1914 - April 1917)

== Russian Republic military formation ==
- Caucasus Front (Russian Republic), the successor organization to the Imperial Russian Caucasus Army

== White Russian (anti-Bolshevik) military formation ==
- Caucasus Volunteer Army, the name used for the White army in southern Russia during the Russian Civil War
- Caucasus Army of VSUR, the name used for a separate White army, which operated between May 1919 and January 1920

== Soviet military formations ==
- 11th Army (RSFSR) (1918–1921), formed October 3 1918 from the Northern Caucasus Army
- Its successor, the Red Banner Caucasus Army (1921–1935), which was named the Independent Caucasus Army until August 1923
- Its successor, the Transcaucasian Military District
- Transcaucasian Front, a Soviet army group of World War II
- Caucasus Front, a Soviet army group of World War II

== Russian Federation military formation ==
- North Caucasus Military District

== See also ==
- Caucasus Front, the name of various military organizations
- Caucasus Army Group (Ottoman Empire), formed during World War I
