= Donskoy Tabak =

Russian cigarette and tobacco company

- Company type: Private joint-stock company
- Industry: Tobacco
- Predecessor: Asmolov's Tobacco Factory, Don State Tobacco Factory
- Founded: 1857; 168 years ago in Rostov-on-Don, Russian Empire
- Founder: Vasily Ivanovich Asmolov
- Defunct: 2018
- Fate: merged
- Successor: JTI Россия, ООО (in Russia)
- Headquarters: Rostov-on-Don, Russia
- Products: Tobacco products
- Revenue: (▲38,866 billion rubles (Fiscal Year Ended December 31, 2020))
- Net income: (▲4.3 billion rubles (Fiscal Year Ended December 31, 2020))
- Parent: Japan Tobacco International

Closed JSC «Donskoy Tabak» (also known as «Don Tobacco») is a former name of Russian cigarette and tobacco manufacturing company, located in Rostov-on-Don, Russia. It was a part of the Japan Tobacco — a cigarette manufacturing international company, until merged into subsidiary JTI. As of 2018, Donskoy Tabak was Russia's fourth-largest cigarette manufacturer.

== History ==
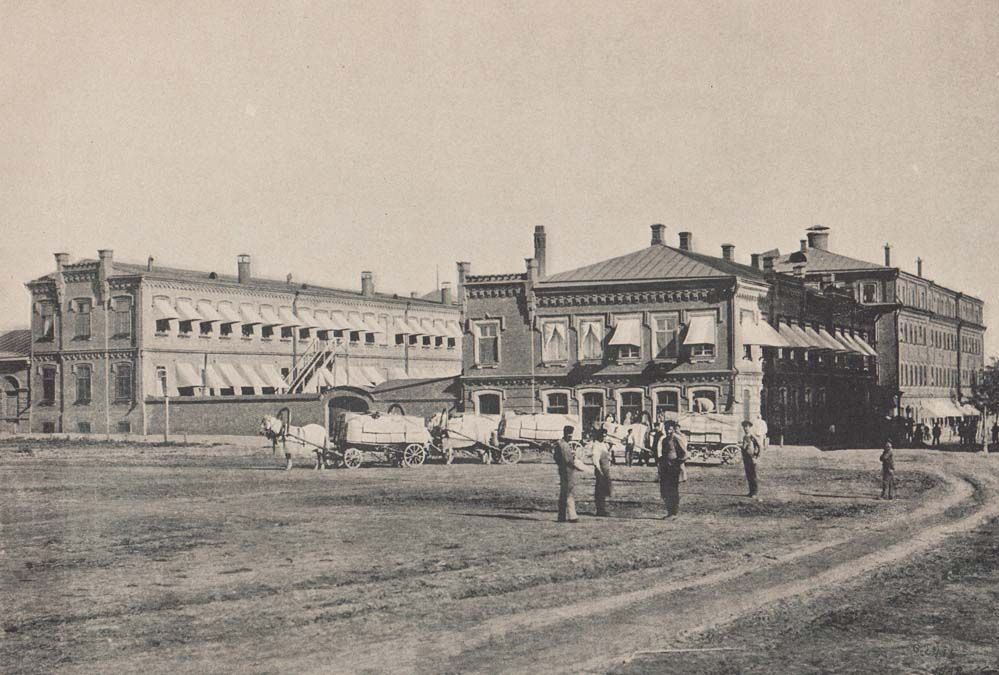
Asmolov's Tobacco Factory at the edge of the 20th century.

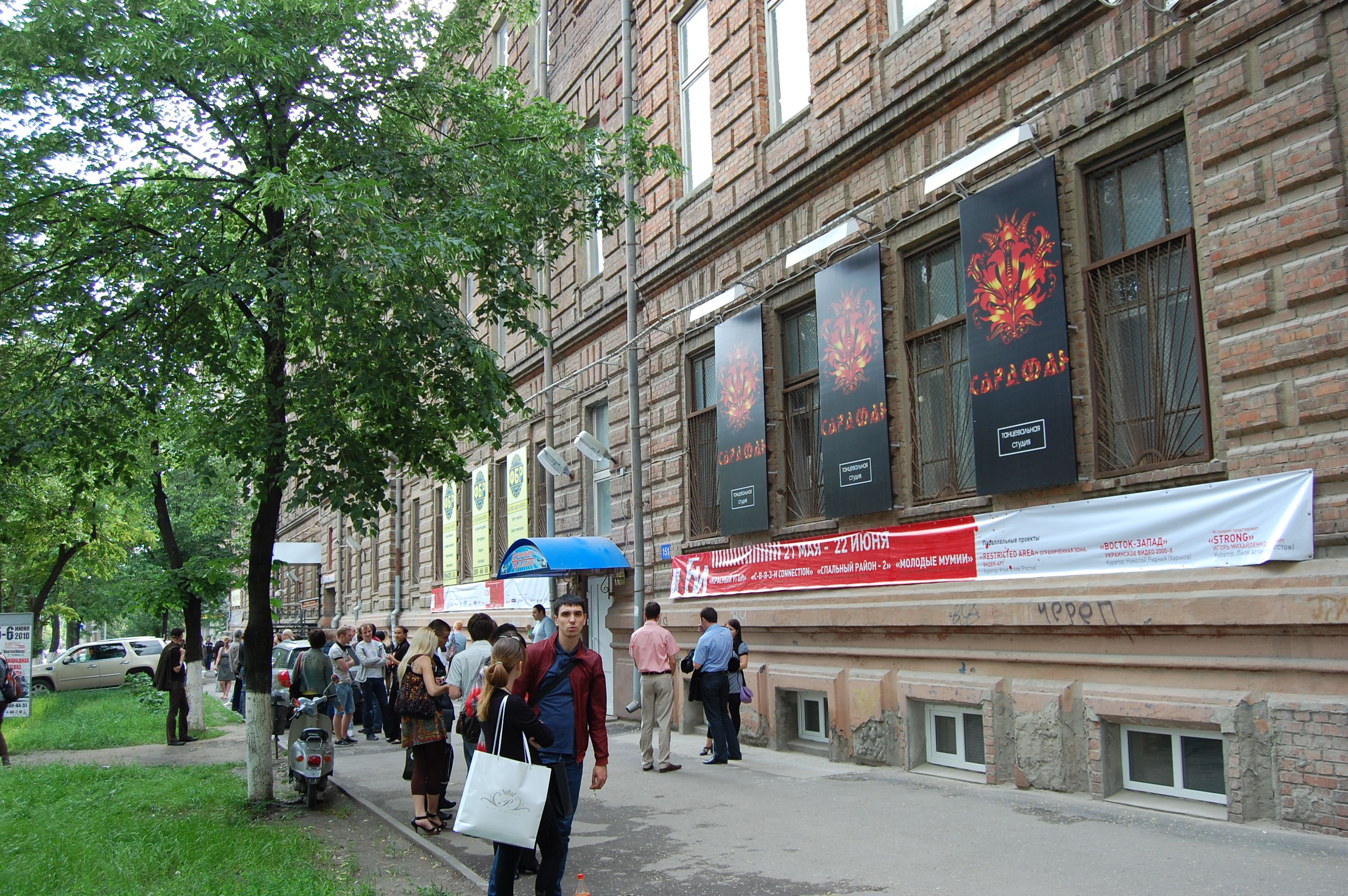
Asmolov's Tobacco Factory at the First South-Russian Biennale of contemporary art, 2010.

Donskoy Tabak is the successor company to a tobacco factory first established by a Russian entrepreneur Vasily Asmolov in 1857 In Rostov-on-Don. In the 1870s, Asmolov's cigarettes won international recognition at Vienna World's Fair, Centennial Exposition in Philadelphia, and Paris World's Fair. As a result, Asmolov's tobacco factory became the "Supplier of His Imperial Majesty's Court" for the Russian Emperor.

After the Revolution of 1917, the factory was nationalised and renamed into Don State Tobacco Factory (DSTF).

In 1992, after the fall of the USSR, the DSTF was privatised by Ivan Savvidis, who had been working at the factory since the 1980s. Savvidis changed the factory's name into «Donskoy Tabak». By 1992, he had acquired 75,71% of the company's shares and became its general director, holding this position until 2003. In the first half of 2018, Savvidis and his wife owned 100% of the company's shares.

In 2005, Donskoy Tabak started to export cigarettes to Ukraine, Kazakhstan, Georgia, and Moldova. In 2012, Donskoy Tabak tried to partner with a Chinese tobacco manufacturer, Hongta Tobacco Group. The companies intended to sign an agreement guaranteeing that Donskoy Tabak would produce and sell up to 2 billion cigarettes a year for the Chinese partner in the Russian market. However, the collaboration was terminated a year later as the companies could not agree on splitting the distribution costs. By 2013, Donskoy Tabak exported up to 20% of its total goods annually. In 2014–2015, Donskoy Tabak reported the decrease in sales, linking the revenue fall to the Ukraine crisis and the newly introduced state's smoke-free policy. A year later, the company announced an increase in export growth due to the unfolding tobacco crisis in Russia.

In March 2018, an international tobacco company, Japan Tobacco, confirmed that it would buy Donskoy Tabak for around $1.6 billion. The deal was finalized the same year in July. Since August 2018, Japan Tobacco has had the absolute majority interest in the company's shares.

In August 2021, Japan Tobacco announced plans to merge Donskoy Tabak with the JTI Russia branch.

Due to the Russian invasion of Ukraine, the merged entity reported that it had to decrease its production up to 30% because of sanctions and subsequent changes in global supply chains.

== Sponsorship ==
Donskoy Tabak supports cultural events and urban beautifications in various districts of Rostov-on-Don. In the early 2000s, the company leased October Revolution Park for 49 years. The following years, Donskoy Tabak sponsored large-scale works on the park's expansion, resulting in the opening of an amusement park in 2002. In 2010, the company offered the historical building of Asmolov's Factory to the First South-Russian Biennale of contemporary art to use for exhibitions.

== Controversies ==
In 2010, Donskoy Tabak was publicly criticised due to its aggressive marketing policy, seemingly aiming to reach out to underaged female customers. The company was accused of encouraging smoking among minors and had to withdraw the advertisements.

== See also ==
- Smoking in Russia
- Tobacco smoking

== Literature ==
- Moiseev, I.V. (2019). Табак и табачная индустрия: вчера, сегодня, завтра [Tobacco and tobacco products: Yesterday, today, tomorrow] (in Russian). Moscow: Dmk Press. p. 282. ISBN 9785041965822.
