= Dibekli, Gümüşhane =

Dibekli
- Village
- Location within Turkey
- Coordinates: 40°28′35″N 39°22′14″E
- Country: Turkey
- Province: Gümüşhane
- District: Gümüşhane
- Elevation: 1,305 m (4,281 ft)
- Population (2022): 236
- Time zone: UTC+3 (TRT)
- Postal code: 29100
- Area code: 0456

Dibekli is a village in Gümüşhane District, Gümüşhane Province in Turkey. Its population is 236 (2022).
