= Kotza Anastas =

Pontic Greek guerrilla leader (1892–1922)

- Κοτζά Αναστάς
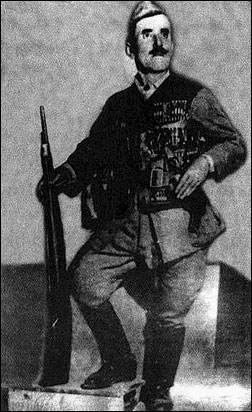
- Kotza Anastas
- Born: Anastasios Papadopoulos; 1892; Endikpınar, Eupatoria, Ottoman Empire
- Died: 2 December 1922; Ezenous, Eupatoria
- Military career
- Affiliation: Pontic Greek guerrillas
- Service years: 1915–1922
- Conflicts: Greek resistance during the Greek genocide

Kotza Anastas (Greek: Κοτζά Αναστάς; 1892 – 2 December 1922), born Anastasios Papadopoulos (Greek: Αναστάσιος Παπαδόπουλος), was a Pontic Greek guerrilla leader active in western Pontus during the Greek genocide and, alongside Anton Pasha, one of the main figures of the Greek resistance.

He was based in the mountains of Topçam and commanded guerrillas operating around Erbaa, Tokat and Amasya. His forces fought Ottoman and Turkish nationalist troops and provided refuge for Greek civilians who had fled into the mountains.

== Early life ==
Papadopoulos was born in Endikpınar, a village in the Erbaa district. Historian Thomas Alexiadis gives his birth year as 1892, although 1895 and 1896 are also given as possible birth years. His grandfather, Kyriakos, was a Greek Orthodox priest who served as an exarch of the metropolitan of Amasya.

At the beginning of World War I, Papadopoulos was conscripted into an Ottoman labour battalion, from which he escaped. In 1915, he joined the guerrilla band of Captain Yakof (Iakovos Karatelidis) in the mountains of Topçam. Following Yakof's death in fighting near Endikpınar in 1916, Papadopoulos succeeded him as commander.

Among the local Greeks, he was known as Kotza Anastas, meaning "Great Anastas", from kotza ("great" or "large"). Among the Turks, he was known as Kotza Giaour ("Great Infidel").

== Guerrilla leadership ==
=== Organization and operations ===
Papadopoulos was the commander of the guerrilla forces based in the mountains of Kotza Dag–Topçam, in the Erbaa region. After the death of Anton Pasha in late 1918, Papadopoulos became one of the leading commanders of the Pontic Greek guerrillas. Anastasios Arapoglou, who came from the village of Iki Pınar, served as his second-in-command. The Topçam region, also known as Gailyatsik, extended between Tokat, Erbaa, Neocaesarea and Amasya. The Topçam defensive sector was approximately 25 kilometres long. Its positions were connected by narrow mountain paths, and civilian refuges were situated behind the defensive lines.

A guerrilla group under Papadopoulos was operating from Ezenous by 1919. Its members included men from villages around Niksar. Greek civilians fled into the surrounding mountains during Turkish raids and attacks against their communities. The mountain refuges were reported to shelter more than 12,000 women and children during the 1921 operations. The refugees in the mountains constructed makeshift shelters from branches, earth and timber and obtained ammunition secretly from Turkish neighbours. They also raided Turkish villages for food and supplies. Villagers sheltering in the mountains also witnessed the destruction of Greek settlements around Erbaa, including Kırkharman, during operations by Topal Osman.

Between November 1920 and June 1921, Turkish forces conducted operations against Papadopoulos's guerrillas in Topçam. Their mountain positions continued to serve as refuges for Greek civilians displaced by the persecution of the region's population. During operations against Turkish forces in Tokat, Papadopoulos commanded a group of approximately 200 guerrillas.

=== Battle of Tsopou Teresi ===
Battle of Tsopou Teresi
- Part of Greek resistance during the Greek genocide
Date	June 1921
Location	Tsopou Teresi, near Samsun, Ottoman Empire
Result	Pontic Greek victory

Belligerents
Pontic Greek guerrillas	Turkish National Movement

Commanders and leaders
Kotza Anastas; Pavlos Tsaousidis; Giorgi Agha; Tsakiris	Unknown

Strength
50 guerrillas and other local forces	Unknown

Casualties and losses
1 captain killed (Tsakiris); other losses unknown	Unknown

In June 1921, Papadopoulos travelled from Topçam with Pavlos Tsaousidis, Michail Koutsoglou and Meletios Pairachtaridis to meet other guerrilla commanders in the mountains near Samsun. Commanders from Dazli, including Giorgi Agha, Konstantinos Karakotas and Anastasios Megalomatis, joined them. They were accompanied by fifty guerrillas. Before reaching Tsopou Teresi, between Asarcık and Destek, they fought for two hours against irregulars who had ambushed them at Akdağ. The commanders discussed shortages of food, weapons and ammunition. Weapons were especially scarce: there were approximately two unarmed men for each armed guerrilla. They agreed to obtain supplies through raids on armed Turkish villages and considered joining the Greek army if it established a front at Ankara.

Turkish troops attacked the meeting place the following morning. The guerrillas repelled the attacks and sent a detachment of fifty men around the Turkish flank. The guerrilla captain Tsakiris was killed during the fighting. After the Turkish withdrawal, the commanders remained for another two days before returning to their respective bases.

=== Battles of Gailyatsik ===
Battles of Gailyatsik
- Part of Greek resistance during the Greek genocide
Date	Late 1921 (52 days)
Location	Gailyatsik, Topçam region, western Pontus, Ottoman Empire
Result	Pontic Greek victory

Belligerents
Pontic Greek guerrillas	Turkish National Movement

Commanders and leaders
Kotza Anastas	Liva Pasha

Strength
Unknown	One division

Casualties and losses
18–28 casualties	700 killed

In late 1921, a Turkish regular army division fought Papadopoulos's guerrillas in the Gailyatsik area of Topçam. The fighting lasted 52 days and was part of a wider campaign against the mountain positions. The Turkish attacks were repelled, and the guerrillas remained in their defensive sector.

=== Defence of Kisalan and Hizirli ===
In January 1922, Papadopoulos and his deputy Theofilos Kouletsenidis (Karafilos) organized the defence of a mountain refuge at Kisalan and Hizirli, near Samsun, against an approaching Turkish force. Thousands of women and children were taking shelter there, while approximately 400 guerrillas defended the position. Three neighbouring captains (Haseris, Pantelis Anastasiadis and Papoulas) each brought another hundred men. The defenders dug trenches and repelled an attack lasting the entire day. The commanders then evacuated the civilians towards Tsingir Oima. Four hours later, the guerrillas withdrew in four groups, disguising themselves with tree branches while passing through Turkish positions.

=== Assistance to civilians and other guerrilla bands ===
An operation was undertaken to rescue approximately 500 Greeks trapped in a cave. Five men approached Papadopoulos to report that the civilians were running out of food and ammunition and were close to surrendering. The guerrilla commanders dispatched thirty armed men carrying ammunition, who surprised the Turkish troops surrounding the cave and enabled those sheltering inside to escape.

Papadopoulos sent reinforcements to guerrillas fighting at Dazli. During an engagement in July 1921, reinforcements attacked from three directions while shouting that he had arrived with a thousand men, prompting the Turkish force to withdraw. In another episode, he dispatched one hundred men under Michail Agha and Karafilos. During renewed fighting in February 1922, he summoned neighbouring guerrilla leaders and assembled another force to assist the defenders and civilians sheltering there. During the fighting, some guerrilla captains proposed executing captured Turkish soldiers, but Michail Agha, Karafilos and Pavlos Tsaousidis opposed the proposal, citing the risk of reprisals against Greek prisoners and deportees. The captives were spared, and Turkish forces were later allowed to retrieve their dead following negotiations and Papadopoulos's permission.

Papadopoulos subsequently reached an agreement with the Turkish authorities that allowed women and children sheltering in the mountains to leave. The guerrilla captain Potos Agha (Prodromos) participated in negotiations between Papadopoulos and Liva Pasha. Following the agreement, Papadopoulos returned to Topçam with his weapons and continued the guerrilla struggle. Following a local ceasefire in October 1922, displaced Greek civilians began descending from the mountains on 20 October, while Papadopoulos and other guerrilla leaders remained in hiding.

== Death ==
Papadopoulos was killed by Turkish irregulars at Ezenous, near Erbaa, on 2 December 1922. His brother Georgios, alongside two other guerrillas were also killed during the fighting. The following day, his remains were taken to Tokat and displayed from a telegraph pole in the town square. The surviving guerrillas attempted to intercept the Turkish force transporting his remains from Erbaa, but the force took a different route.

The surviving guerrilla leaders considered retaliating against the Turks who committed the killings, but abandoned the plan because they feared reprisals against Greek civilians travelling through Turkish-held territory during the evacuation. His wife, Despoina Lazaridou, managed to reach Greece, along with his brother Ambrosios and two sisters.

=== Aftermath in Topçam ===
The Topçam mountain refuges continued to shelter Pontic Greeks after Papadopoulos's death. Over the period from June 1920 to December 1923, approximately 30,000 people were sheltered in the region. The evacuation of civilians towards Greece continued into the spring of 1923 and approximately 200 armed guerrillas and a small number of women remained in the Topçam mountains until November 1923. The surviving fighters explored the possibility of escaping by sea to Russia and negotiated with a Turkish boatman, but their initial arrangements did not succeed.

== Legacy ==
A marble monument commemorating Papadopoulos was unveiled at Neraida, near Servia, in the Kozani region, on 26 July 2015. A historical and cultural association in Neocaesarea, Pieria is also named after him. He is also commemorated in a Pontic song titled Kotza Anastas.

== Sources ==
- Alexiadis, Thomas (2008). Η Αμισός του Πόντου [Amisos of Pontus] (Master's thesis) (in Greek). Aristotle University of Thessaloniki.
- Alexiadis, Thomas (2018). Ο Πολέμαρχος Αναστάσιος Παπαδόπουλος (1892–1922) και το αντάρτικο του Πόντου (in Greek). Ιστορικός Ποντιακός Σύλλογος Νεοκαισάρειας Πιερίας «Κοτζά Αναστάς».
- Chrysostomidou, Eirini (2010). Ποντιακή Δημοκρατία: Το όραμα της ίδρυσης και η πορεία στο πλαίσιο των πολιτικών ζυμώσεων και των διπλωματικών παιχνιδιών στην Ευρώπη μετά το τέλος του Α΄ Παγκοσμίου Πολέμου [Pontic Republic: The Vision of Its Establishment and Its Development within the Political and Diplomatic Processes in Europe after the First World War] (PDF) (Master's thesis) (in Greek). Democritus University of Thrace.
- Çetinoğlu, Sait (23 November 2016). "Pontos bölgesindeki Direniş ve Gerilla hareketi". Pontos Forum TR (in Turkish).
- Çilingir, Tamer (5 July 2017). "19 Mayıs Türk'e bayram Pontos'a soykırım". Yeni Özgür Politika (in Turkish).
- Çilingir, Tamer (23 December 2018). "Pontos Partizan Hareketi/ Son partizan Eleni Çavuş-3". Etkin Haber Ajansı (in Turkish).
- Efstathiadis, Dimitris I. (7 March 2019). "Κοτζά Αναστάς: Ο άγνωστος ήρωας του Πόντου". Pemptousia (in Greek).
- Doroukidis, Ioannis Pr. "Ένας Πόντιος... Κολοκοτρώνης". Ιερά Μονή Παντοκράτορος (in Greek).
- Giannitsopoulos, Theodoros (11 December 2021). "Παύλος Μωυσιάδης: Ο καπετάνιος του ποντιακού αντάρτικου". SLpress (in Greek).
- Karyofyllidis, Vasilis (16 August 2015). "Στα γυρίσματα ενός βίντεο για τον Κοτζά Αναστάς με τη συμμετοχή Ποντίων καλλιτεχνών (φωτο)". Pontos News (in Greek).
- Kitromilides, Paschalis M., ed. (2013). "Μαρτυρίες από τις επαρχίες του Μεσόγειου Πόντου". Η Έξοδος [The Exodus] (in Greek). Vol. 3. Athens: Κέντρο Μικρασιατικών Σπουδών.
- Levitsky, Ron. "History from the Bottom Up" (PDF). Hellenic Research Center.
- Özen, Orhan (2021). Niksar Kazasında Muhacirin İskânı: Batum Muhacirleri Örneği (1877–1923) (PDF) (Master's thesis) (in Turkish). Nevşehir Hacı Bektaş Veli University.
- Papadopulos, Lazaros (5 March 2026). "Kocaa Anastas – Pontus'un Son Akritası". Barış İçin Aktivite (in Turkish). Published online by Yannis Vasilis Yaylalı.
- Panagiotidou, Theodora (14 November 2020). "Κοτζά Αναστάς, Σέρβια Κοζάνης". Digital Glyptotheque (in Greek). University of Ioannina.
- "Καντήλι άσβεστο η νέα στέγη του Ιστορικού Ποντιακού Συλλόγου Νεοκαισάρειας «Ο Κοτζά Αναστάς»". Pontos News (in Greek). 4 July 2014.
- "Κοτζά Αναστάς ή Αναστάσιος Παπαδόπουλος (1896–1922)". Pontos News (in Greek). 2 December 2017.
- "Ανήλικοι αντάρτες στα βουνά του Πόντου μαζί με τον Κοτζά Αναστάς". Pontos News (in Greek). 25 May 2021.
- Tepecik, Melike (2015). "Milli Mücadele Döneminde Erbaa'da Rum Çetelerinin Faaliyetleri". Tokat Tarihi ve Kültürü Sempozyumu (25–26 Eylül 2014): Bildiriler (PDF) (in Turkish). Vol. 1. Tokat: Gaziosmanpaşa Üniversitesi. pp. 691–702.
- Tsaousidis, Pavlos (2017). Η βιογραφία του οπλαρχηγού του Πόντου Παύλου Τσαουσίδη (in Greek). Memoirs prepared for publication by Rozalia Gavriilidou and Theofanis Malkidis.
- Zografos, Anastasios (2013). Le volontaire dans l’armée grecque durant la guerre gréco-turque en Asie mineure (1919–1923) (Doctoral thesis) (in French). Université Paul-Valéry Montpellier III.
- Varvarigos, Andreas; Varvarigos, Anastasios-Romanos (2019). Οι αλησμόνητες πατρίδες του παππού και της γιαγιάς: Μαρτυρίες [The Unforgettable Homelands of Grandfather and Grandmother: Testimonies] (PDF) (in Greek). Athens: Infognomon.
