= Dumanlı =

Village in Gümüşhane Province, Turkey

- Village
- Location within Turkey
- Coordinates: 40°40′49″N 39°47′3″E
- Country: Turkey
- Province: Gümüşhane
- District: Gümüşhane
- Population (2022): 80
- Time zone: UTC+3 (TRT)

Dumanlı, also known as Sanda (Pontic: Σάντα), is a village in Gümüşhane District, Gümüşhane Province in Turkey, close to its border with Trabzon Province. Its population is 80 (2022).

== History ==
The village was established in the 17th century by Pontic Greeks who fled the coast of Pontus in order to escape the oppression of the Derebeys. It was originally named Santa (Σάντα) and was an important caravan and mining village, with 13 neighborhoods and more than 5,000 citizens.

Before 1856, the inhabitants of Santa were recorded as Christian (51%) and Crypto-Christian (49%). After 1856, with the Ottoman Reform Edict of 1856 that equalized all citizens regardless of religion (removing the "first citizen" status of the Muslims), they changed their status to Christian instead of Crypto-Christians, as pretending to be Muslim was no longer necessary to receive equal rights.

During the Greek genocide, the population tried to organize armed resistance against the Turkish army. Pontian guerrilla bands appeared in the mountains of Santa as early as 1916 under the leadership of Euklidis Kourtidis and successfully resisted a Turkish attack on September 6, 1921.

Later during the population exchange between Greece and Turkey in 1923, Santa's citizens refused to accept the exchange and fought against being deported, but in the end, they were deported to Greece. After the exchange, the village was completely vacated and renamed and the lands and properties were registered in the Turkish treasury. The village's population settled in Greek Macedonia and Thrace, with some also settling in Georgia. The town of Nea Santa was founded by them in the Kilkis regional unit in Central Macedonia, as was Santa in Georgia.

== Today ==
Today it is a sparsely populated district in the far north of Gümüşhane province, consisting of seven villages:

- Piştofandon (Pontic: Πιστοφάντων): 400 houses, St. Kyriake, St. Panteleimon, St. Christophoros churches, a primary school and fountain of Christoforos. Etymology: piştov, "gun" + -anton (toponymical suffix in Greek)
- Zurnaciandon (Pontic: Ζουρνατσάντων): 120 houses, St. Georgios, St. Constantine, St. Kyriake churches and a primary school. Etymology: zurnaci, "zurna player" (a reed woodwind instrument) + -anton
- Çakalandon (Pontic: Τσακαλάντων): 53 houses, Zoodohu Pigis and St. Georgios churches and a primary school. Etymology: çakal, "jackal" + -anton
- Ishanandon (Pontic: Ισχανάντων): 150 houses. St. Kyriake, St. Georgios churches. 2 primary school (one of them only for girls). Etymology: işhan, meaning "prince" in Armenian + -anton
- Cozlorandon (Pontic: Κοζλαράντων): 60 houses. St. Apostles Petros and Pavlos churches and a primary school
- Pinetandon (Pontic: Πινετάντων): 30 houses. Prophet Elias and St. Georgios churches and a primary school
- Terzandon (Pontic: Τερζάντων): 200 houses. St. Theodoros and Metamorfosis churches. Etymology: terzi, meaning "tailor" in Turkish + -anton

The Santa ruins were declared a Cultural-Archaeological Site and Natural Site in 1999. But as of 2022, only seven of the 13 villages with historical settlements have the conservation status.

== See also ==
- Nea Santa, the Greek village founded by the former inhabitants of Santa
- Pontic Greeks
