= Caucasian Front =

Caucaus Front (or Caucasian Front) may have one of the following meanings

- Caucasus Front (Russian Republic), the designation for the main army of the Russian Republic (successor to the Caucasus Army of the Imperial Russian Army) in the Caucasus in World War I from April 1917 until its dissolution
- Caucasian Front (RSFSR) (1920-1921), a front of the Red Army during the Russian Civil War
- Caucasus Front (Soviet Union), Soviet army group of World War II
- Caucasian Front (militant group), Islamist separatist unit during the Second Chechen War, active in 2005–2007

== See also ==
- Russian Caucasus Army, a variety of Russian military formations, 18th to 21st century
- Caucasus Campaign, the military campaign that took place in the Caucasus during World War I
- North Caucasian Front, a Front (military subdivision) of the Soviet Army during the World War II
- Transcaucasian Front, another Front of the Soviet Army during the World War II
