= Anton Pasha =

Turkish-speaking Pontic Greek guerrilla

Pasha Antonis Hatzieleftheriou
- Αντώνης Χατζηελευθερίου
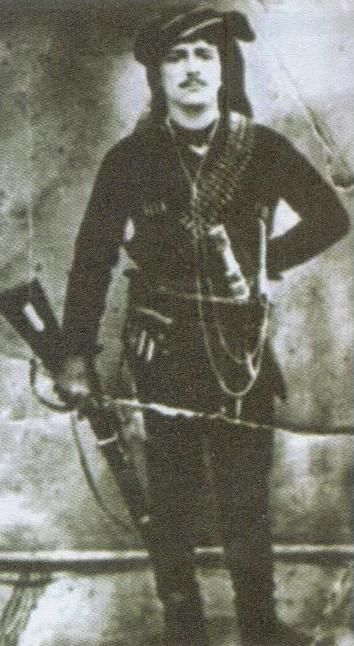
- Likely photograph of Anton Pasha
- Born: 1888; Kurugökçe, Atakum
- Died: August 1917 (aged 28–29); Mount Nebiyan, Samsun
- Spouse: Pelagia Oxouzoglou
- Military career
- Service years: 1915–1918
- Rank: General
- Nickname: Anton Pasha

Antonis Hatzieleftheriou (Greek: Αντώνης Χατζηελευθερίου; Turkish: Antonis Hacilefteryu; 1888 – August 1917), commonly known as Anton Pasha (Turkish: Anton Paşa; Greek: Άντων Πασάς) or Anton Karabey (lit. 'Dark Lord Anton'), was an important Turkish-speaking Pontic Greek guerrilla leader. He emerged as one of the leading organizers of the Pontic Greek self-defense militia in the Samsun area, fighting against the Ottoman Army and Topal Osman during World War I and the Pontic Greek genocide.

Alongside Kotza Anastas, he was one of the most important Pontic Greek guerrillas and the first to organize an armed resistance against the Turks in response to the Greek genocide.

== Early life ==
Antonis Hatzieleftheriou, commonly known as "Anton Pasha" was born in 1888 in the village of Kurugökçe in today's Atakum, Samsun. After the Young Turk Revolution and the forced conscription of Christians in the Ottoman Army Anton Pasha was conscripted in 1912. Due to his family suffering from derebey terrorism in the past, he was reluctant to do so. He finally accepted due to fears of reprisals against his village's population.

Anton was sent to Amasya for training. He went through discrimination from his Muslim officer who referred to him, and to other conscripted Christians, as giaour. He stayed there for ten months; afterwards he escaped with one of his friends to the mountains of Bafra near his native village, where he worked as a horse dealer.

== World War I ==
At the outbreak of World War I, Anton Pasha did not join the Ottoman Army, but stayed in the mountains. During the outbreak of World War I, violence began ensuing in the region. As such, Anton realized the necessity of self-defense and took steps to protect the native Pontic Greek population from the Turks. Anton Pasha's nephew, Konstantinos Hacitheodoridis noted the direness of the situation:

Gendarmes' detachments set out to hunt down the deserters in every single Greek village. They would beat up the village presidents, and any priests they managed to catch were marched off to Samsun. In the morning, around 5 o'clock before dawn, they would call out their names for the gallows. As for the families of those they couldn't find, they would burn down their homes... It was a time when many Greek deserters were fleeing to Russia, into the Caucasus.

The Turks were not punishing those responsible for desertion or failure to enlist in the army, but rather their relatives, the priests and the community's representatives. This marked the beginning of the large-scale Pontic Greek genocide.

=== Beginning of Anton Pasha's guerrilla warfare ===
Anton established his headquarters in Mount Nebiyan and surrounded himself with other like-minded guerrillas. According to historian Thomas Alexiadis:

His strategic genius, combined with the fearless and desperate draft-evaders and deserters, created a protective shield for the Greeks who had fled to the mountains, guarding them against the fear of Young Turk reprisals from army and gendarme detachments. Before long, he had become the fear and terror of the Turks, who were the first to call him Anton Pasha, thereby giving him the moniker of general.

In 1915, he met his future wife, Pelagia Oxouzoglou (Greek: Πελαγία Οξούζογλου), also from Bafra. She had fled Turkish persecution alongside her family and she decided to join Anton's struggle. He cared a lot for the lives of his people, especially women and children but also of his fellow freedom fighters, stating that:

We must always strike back when they attack us, whether from behind or from the front, and for two hours. No longer than that... That is how we will all hold out, without getting killed and without losing our dignity...

In early 1916, after the Russian takeover of Trabzon in April, the Pontic Greek genocide intensified, especially in Western Pontus. As such, more insurgents began to emerge and join the ranks of Anton Pasha. Consequently, a united front and a collective leader had to arise. Anton was chosen. As reported by other Pontic Greek notable guerrillas:

In 1916, they called upon Anton Pasha to go to Trebizond to make contact with the Russian general and the Metropolitan of Trebizond, Chrysanthos... The Russians kept telling us, do not stop fighting the Turks for a single moment... It was there that we also had to choose the General Commander of all the guerrilla groups operating in the western Pontus... we elected Anton Pasha as General Commander.

The Russian Imperial Army promised weapons and ammunitions to the Pontic Greek self-defense militia led by Anton, which would be used to shield the native Greek population of the region. The guerrillas mainly carried out defensive operations against attacks from the Turks and rarely attacked the Turkish Army, particularly when they needed food and supplies.

=== Battle of Lykastos River ===
Battle of Lynkestos River
- Part of World War I
Date	August 1916
Location	Lykastos River, Samsun Province, Ottoman Empire
Result	Pontic Greek victory

Belligerents
Pontic Greek guerrillas	(Ottoman Empire) Ottoman Army

Commanders and leaders
Anton Pasha; Vasil Aga	Unknown

Strength
400+	800

Casualties and losses
40 dead, 90 wounded	200 dead, 150 wounded

Using guerrilla warfare, Anton Pasha's guerrillas led various victorious battles against the Turkish army in the villages of Kalınıkdağ, Palıkgöl, Çiftliktepesi, Görukökçe, Eğrisiırmak, Çasur, Kestane Sayvanı, Eğribel, Taflanköy, Peklik and others.

The Battle of Lykastos River is considered one of Anton's greatest achievements. His fellow Pontic Greek freedom fighter, Vasilios Anthopoulos (also known as Vasil Aga), had acquired 1,000 Russian rifles from Trabzon. These weapons, which were being transported through sea, subsequently landed near the Lykastos River and were meant to arm local Greek insurgents and guerrillas. However, Ottoman forces rapidly encircled the landing site with two infantry battalions. Vasil Aga sent a call for help to Anton Pasha, as he quickly realized the direness of the situation. As Vasil Aga's 400 men were fighting desperately, Ottoman forces kept tightening their encirclement. However, suddenly, gunshots and whistles were heard. Anton Pasha had arrived. Vasil Aga described the battle as such:

The Pavrene ["from Bafra"] guerrilla fighters, together with their leader Antonis, although they had marched for 4–5 hours, arrived in time and without stopping anywhere to sit and rest. They threw themselves into battle like lions, and with their shouts and whistles they caused the Turks to panic and flee. The patriotism of these Turkish-speaking yet fanatical Greek Christians of Paphra, and their famous valour, made the Turks fear them. The same happened here as well. As soon as they heard the cries of Antonis and his men, they ran away, leaving behind 200 dead and 150 wounded on the battlefield, while our own losses were 40 dead and 90 wounded. What price, one might ask, could ever purchase such bravery and courage of the fighters of Paphra and their war leader Anton Pasha? Consequently, the Turks, whenever they heard “Pavrenoi,” not only hated them and openly showed their hostility toward them, but also tried by every means to exterminate them. These were therefore the Pavrenoi of Pontus: those brave and honorable warriors.

=== Clash with Topal Osman and abduction incident ===
Out of fear, Topal Osman and his men avoided fighting directly against Anton Pasha and his men, leaving others to fight them instead. In March 1917, they abducted his wife, Pelagia Oxouzoglou, and took her hostage, in hopes that Anton surrenders.

However, instead of surrendering, Anton stormed the Turkish gendarmerie station in Bafra with 50 Pontic Greek guerrilla commanders and 400 guerrillas, taking the Turkish soldiers hostage. From there, he sent a letter bearing his personal seal to the highest military commander in Amasya, where he threatened to kill the soldiers and then burn Bafra to the ground if his wife was not freed. The letter was, for the first time, signed with his title Anton Karabey (lit. 'Dark Lord Anton'). After this event, his wife was released from captivity. The commander personally went to the prison in April, freed Pelagia, placed her in a horse-drawn carriage with an officer, and ordered her transported first toward Kavak, Samsun and then toward Anton's headquarters in Nebyan.

Following this humiliation, in May 1917, 200 Turks from Samsun approached Germanos Karavangelis and told him to go Mount Nebyan, where Anton had established his headquarters, to propose peace with the guerrillas. The Turks guaranteed "full amnesty for all the guerrillas and their captains, as well as compensation for everyone who had suffered losses during the fighting between the guerrillas and the Turkish troops". Anton did not consider these guarantees unreasonable, but he declined the offer because he did not trust the Ottoman authorities to honor any of their agreements.

== Death ==
Anton Pasha was betrayed by two or three of his own men, who had been bribed by the Turks, and was ultimately killed in August 1917. Germanos Karavangelis sent a body of guerrillas to try and find the people who killed Anton, but found nothing.

His death immensely harmed the movement, but did not completely destroy it. As a leader, he was succeeded by Kyriakos Papadopoulos (Kısa Bacak). Meanwhile, Anton's wife, Captain Pelagia, kept fighting until 1923. She became known as the "Amazon of Pontus".

== Legacy ==
Historian Thomas Alexiadis considers Anton Pasha to have been "the preeminent figure of the armed struggle in Pontus," and calls him "a historical figure of unparalleled stature, who became immortalized through the lips of the tormented people of Bafra and Amisos". Tamer Çilingir titles him as Kaptanların Kaptanı ("Captain of Captains"). He has also been referred to as "the Kolokotronis of Pontus". Dimitris Psathas wrote that very little has been written about him, but that he was known by his contemporaries as extremely fearless even against superior Turkish detachments.

=== Song of Anton Pasha ===
Antonis Papadopoulos - "Song of Anton Pasha" (in Turkish) on YouTube

The "Song of Anton Pasha" is a threnody, lamenting Anton's death. It was, and still is, sang by Pontic Greeks, both Turkish-speakers and Greek-speakers, in the entirety of Western Pontus. There are various versions of the song in both languages.

One of the Turkish versions goes as such:

Anton dedikleri
bir yosma uşak
Bir omuzdan bir omuza
bin beş yüz fişek

Gelme düşman gelme,
gelme üstüme
Anton paşa derler
benim ismime

Anton’un başında
zabit nişanı
Dünyaya dayıldı
Anton’un şani

Gelme düşman gelme,
gelme üstüme
Anton paşa derler
benim ismime

Anton’un omuzunda
elik postları
Anton’u vuranlar
kendi dostları

Gelme düşman gelme,
gelme üstüme
Anton paşa derler
benim ismime

One of the Greek versions has a few extra lines which might have been forgotten in the Turkish version over the years. Those extra lines reveal that one of the men who betrayed Anton Pasha was his groomsman:

Ο Αντώνης που λέγανε ήταν ένα νέο παληκάρι
στους ώμους του χωρούσανε χίλιες πεντακόσιες σφαίρες.

Ο Αντώνης με τα κιάλια αγναντεύει την Αμισό
και στα βουνά του Νεμπιέν τρέχουν τα αίματα ασταμάτητα.

Στο κεφάλι του Αντώνη σημάδι στρατηγού
σε ολόκληρο τον κόσμο απλώθηκε η φήμη του.

Τα βόλια του Αντώνη καίνε πολλές ψυχές
και η φωνή του Αντώνη χαλάει τα βουνά.

Στον ώμο του Αντώνη δέρμα ελαφιού
τον Αντώνη τον σκότωσαν οι φίλοι του.

Από του Ταφλάν τη βρύση δεν μπόρεσα να περάσω
το φίλο από τον εχθρό δεν μπόρεσα να ξεχωρίσω.

Σεβάσου κουμπάρε Κουλπαρίδη την ψυχή μου,
του Αβραάμ ο άτιμος με σκότωσε.

Κάθησε Πελαγία στο μνήμα μου
και δες τι έπαθα τώρα στη νεότητά μου,
του Αβραάμ ο άτιμος με σκότωσε.

Μη με πυροβολείς Κουλπαρίδη, μη με σκοτώνεις,
σύντροφοι να γίνουμε, έλα κοντά μου,
οι σύντροφοι δεν ψάχνουν για αιτίες,
η δολοφονία του Αντώνη δε σε ωφελεί.

Κλείστε τα παράθυρα, αέρας μη φυσήξει
το θάνατο του Αντώνη κανείς να μην τον μάθει.

Από χαμηλά να μεταφέρετε το νεκρό μου σώμα
για να δει όλος ο λαός πώς με κατάντησαν.

== Sources ==
- Αλεξιάδης, Θωμάς (2012). Η Πάφρα του Πόντου: ιστορία, εκκλησία, εθνικοί αγώνες (Thesis) (in Greek). Αριστοτέλειο Πανεπιστήμιο Θεσσαλονίκης (ΑΠΘ), Σχολή Θεολογική, Τμήμα Ποιμαντικής και Κοινωνικής Θεολογίας. pp. 135–139. doi:10.12681/eadd/42298.
- Αλεξιάδης, Θωμάς (2008). Η Αμισός του Πόντου (Thesis) (in Greek). Αριστοτέλειο Πανεπιστήμιο Θεσσαλονίκης (ΑΠΘ), Σχολή Θεολογική, Τμήμα Ποιμαντικής και Κοινωνικής Θεολογίας. pp. 117–118. doi:10.26262/HEAL.AUTH.IR.113111.
- Çetinoğlu, Sait (2011). "The Pontus Independence Movement and the Greek Genocide". HyeTert (in Turkish).
- Çilingir, Tamer (2014). "Kaptanların Kaptanı Anton Paşa". HyeTert (in Turkish).
- Çilingir, Tamer (2024). "Pontoslu Kadın Partizan Kaptan Pelagia". Pontos Gerçeği.
- Demirer, Temel (2021). ""Bizim hikâyemiz"(!): Pontos meselesi..." Kaldıraç (in Turkish).
- Μαλκίδης, Θεοφάνης (2015). Το αντάρτικο στον Πόντο και ο Κοτζά Αναστάς (Αναστάσιος Παπαδόπουλος). Αθήνα: Γόρδιος. ISBN 978-960-6826-63-4.
- Lymperopoulos, Loukas (2020). Die Pontosgriechen – in Geschichte und Gegenwart [The Pontic Greeks: Past and Present] (PDF) (in German). Hamburg: Landeszentrale für politische Bildung Hamburg. p. 120. ISBN 978-3-946246-28-2.
- Ψαθάς, Δημήτρης (1966). Γη του Πόντου (in Greek). Αθήνα: Εκδόσεις Μαρία Δ. Ψαθά.
- Ποντιακός Στίχος (n.d.). "Αντών'-Πασ̌άς". Ποντιακός Στίχος (in Greek).
