= October Revolution Park (Rostov-on-Don) =

Russian public park

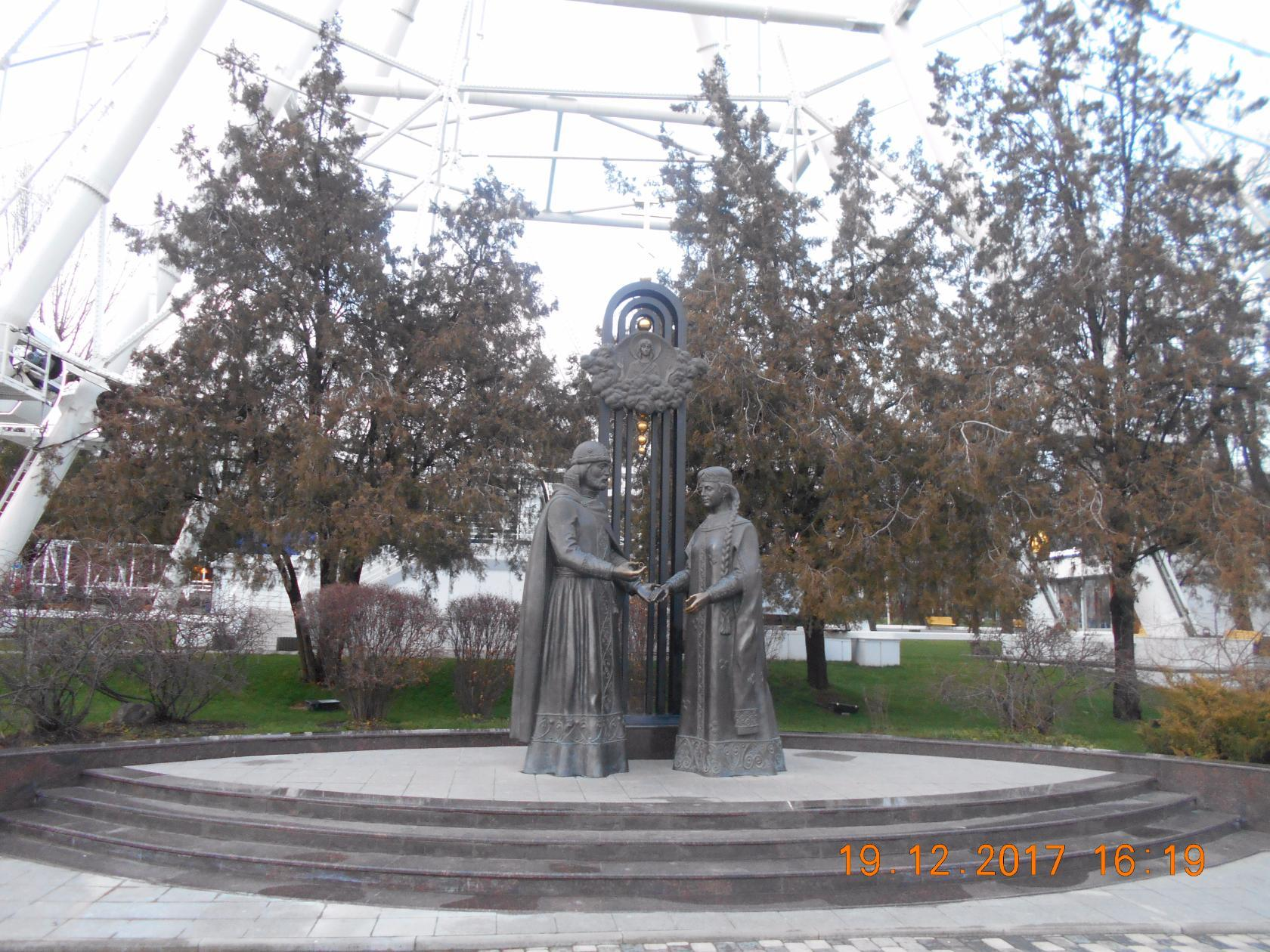
- A view of October Park of Culture and Leisure
- Interactive map of October Revolution Park
- Location: Rostov-on-Don, Russia
- Coordinates: 47.1348°N 39.4442°E
- Area: 17 hectares
- Created: 1926

The October Revolution Park (Russian: Парк имени Октябрьской революции) is a park in Rostov-on-Don established in 1926. It is situated in the centre of the city near Teatralnaya Square.

== History and description ==
The area that is today known as October Revolution Park was first founded as a park zone in 1926 between the cities of Rostov-on-Don and Nakhichevan-on-Don. With further urban development, Nakhichevan was merged with Rostov in 1928.

In the 1970s the place became one of the favorite vacation spots for Rostov dwellers. The park has excellent conditions for sports (minifootball field, ice rink and a field for paintball). There are many attractions, children playgrounds, cafes and souvenir stalls. In the park area, among the rich greenery there are pedestrian paths. The total area of the park is almost 17 hectares.

In the park there are sculptural compositions: the "Bench of Reconciliation" and the Monument to Peter and Fevronia; there is also the Memorial Plaque dedicated to the soldiers and officers of the 56th Army and the Alley of Glory. Another notable place of the October Revolution Park is an artificial lake, where one can see waterfowl, as well as aviary for flamingos and peacocks.

In the early 2000s, the park was leased for 49 years to the «Don Tobacco» company. The following years, large-scale works on its expansion took place. In 2002 there was opened an amusement park. In 2016, the third largest observation wheel, 65 meters high, was also opened there.

Various celebrations, cultural events and mass festivities take place there. Every year the park is visited by 1.5 million people. Next to the park, at Teatralnaya Square, there is a fountain called Atlantes, which was designed by architect Yevgeny Vuchetich.

=== Gallery ===
October Revolution Park

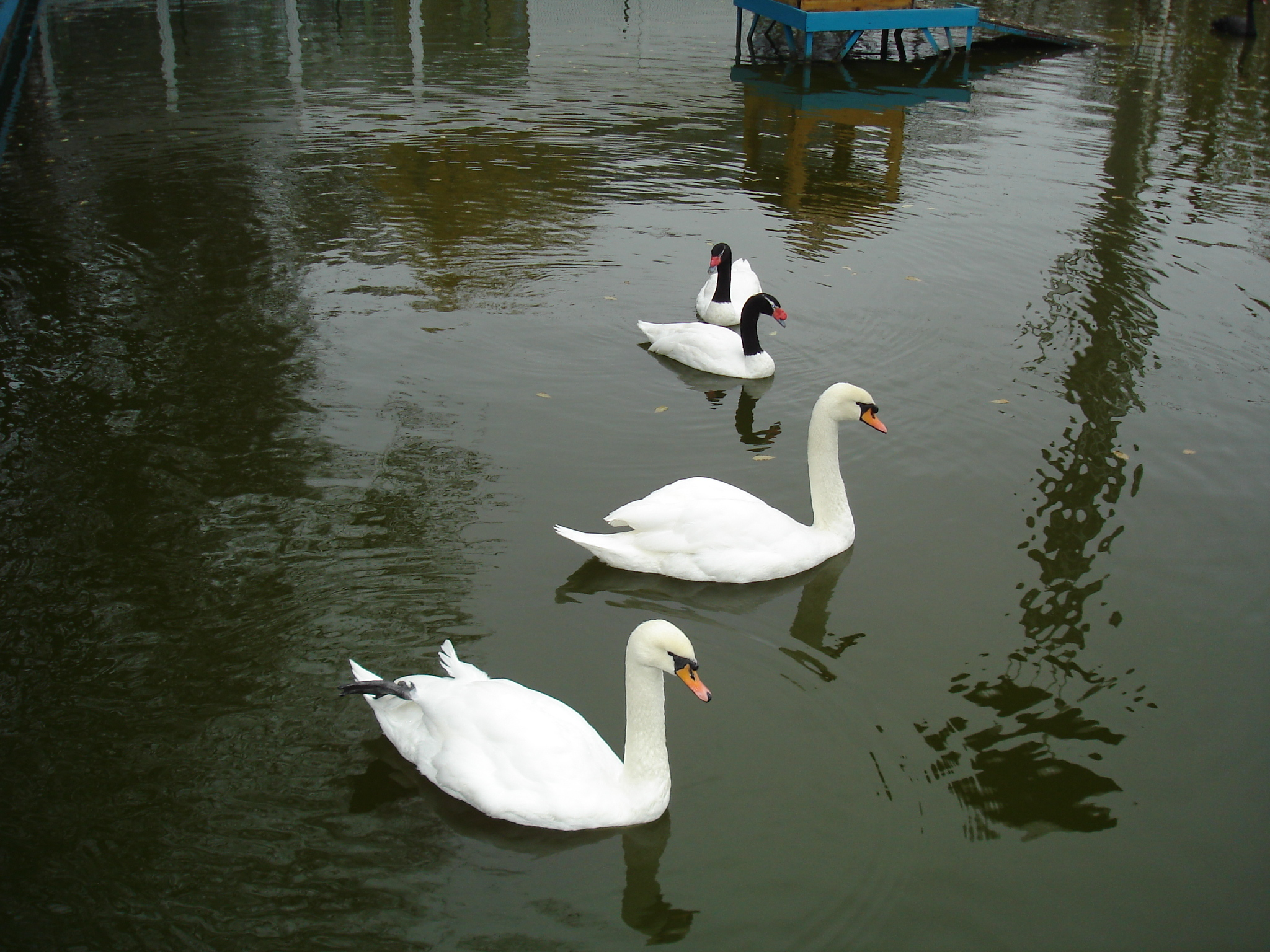

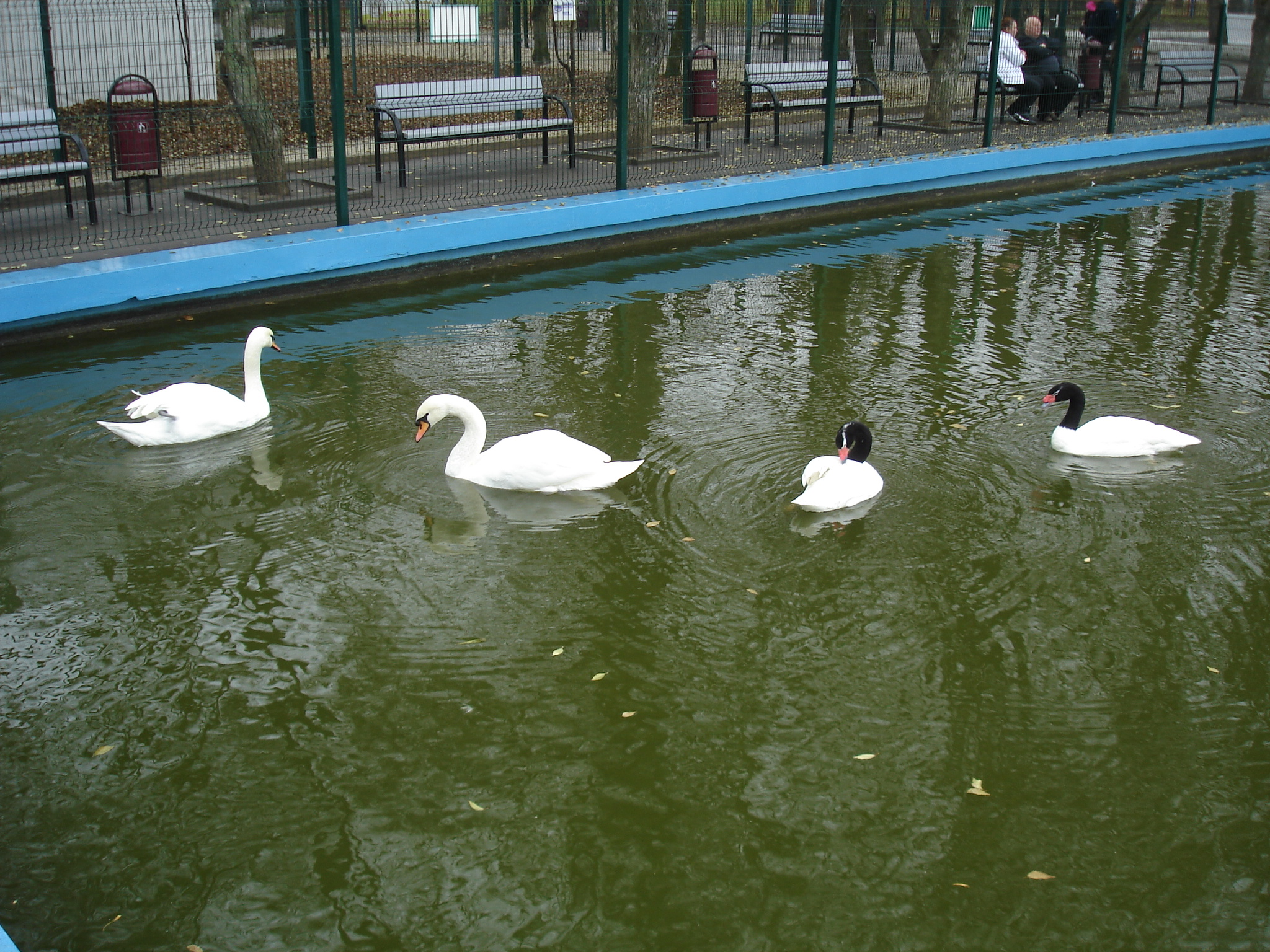

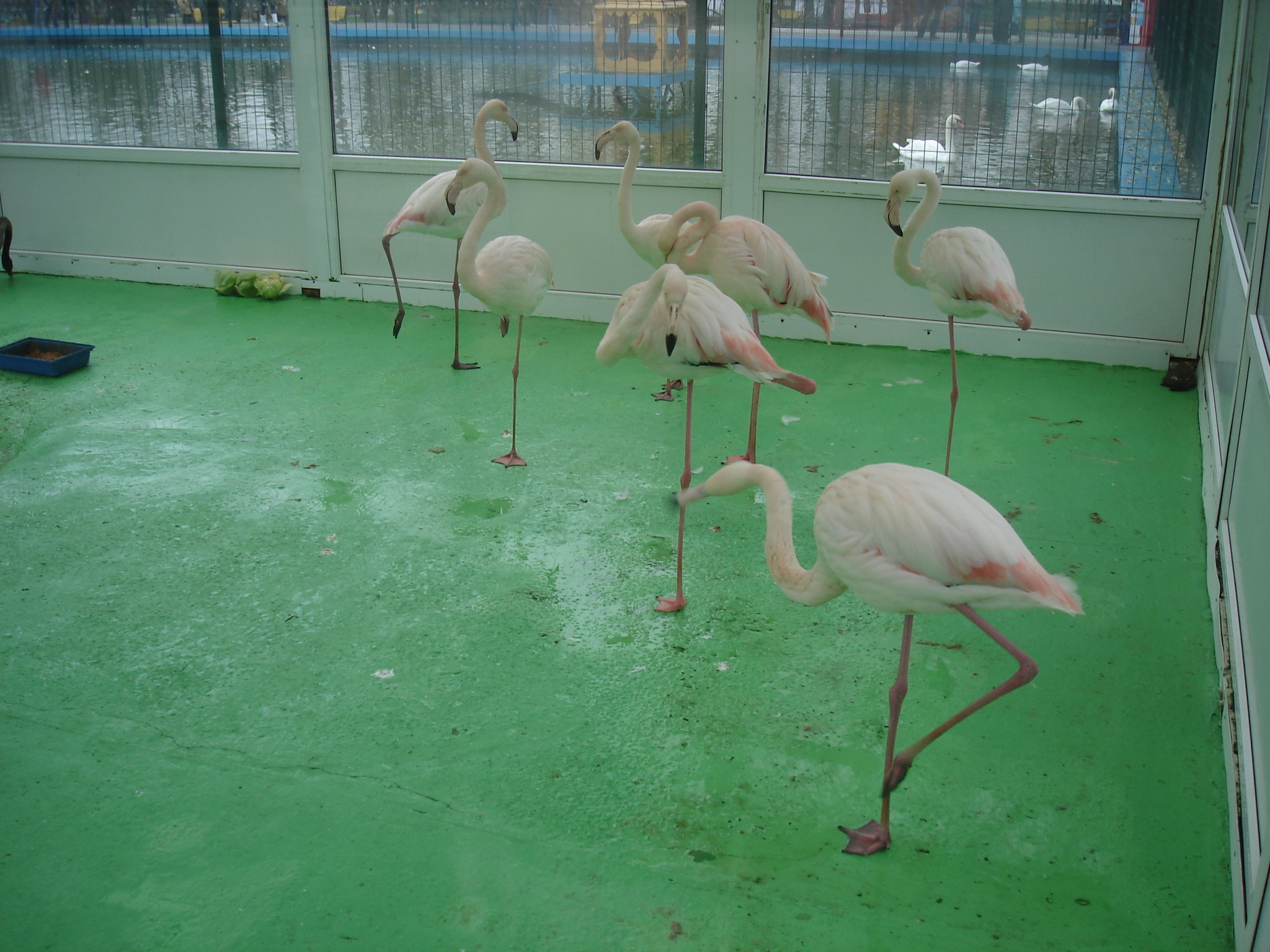

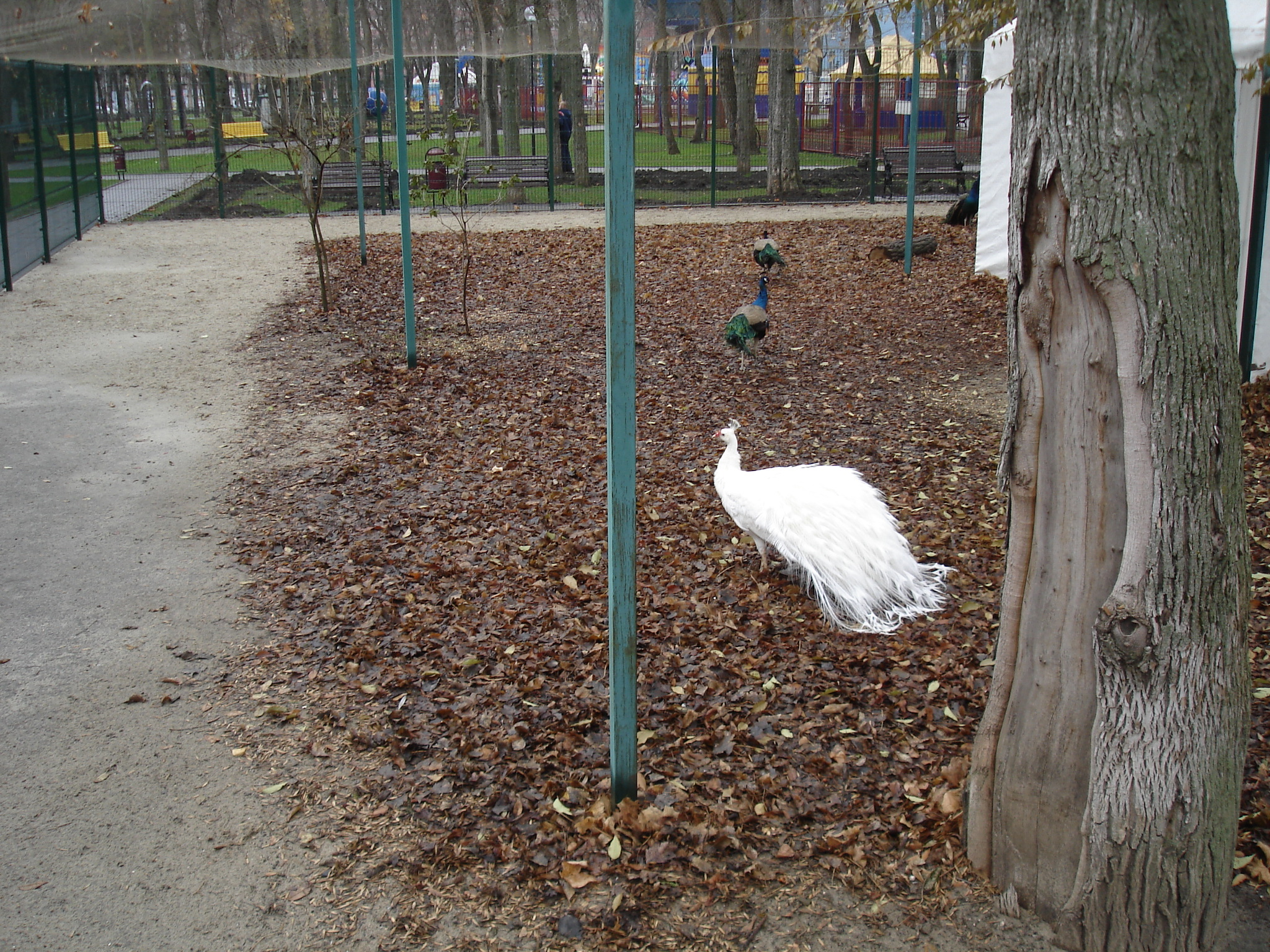

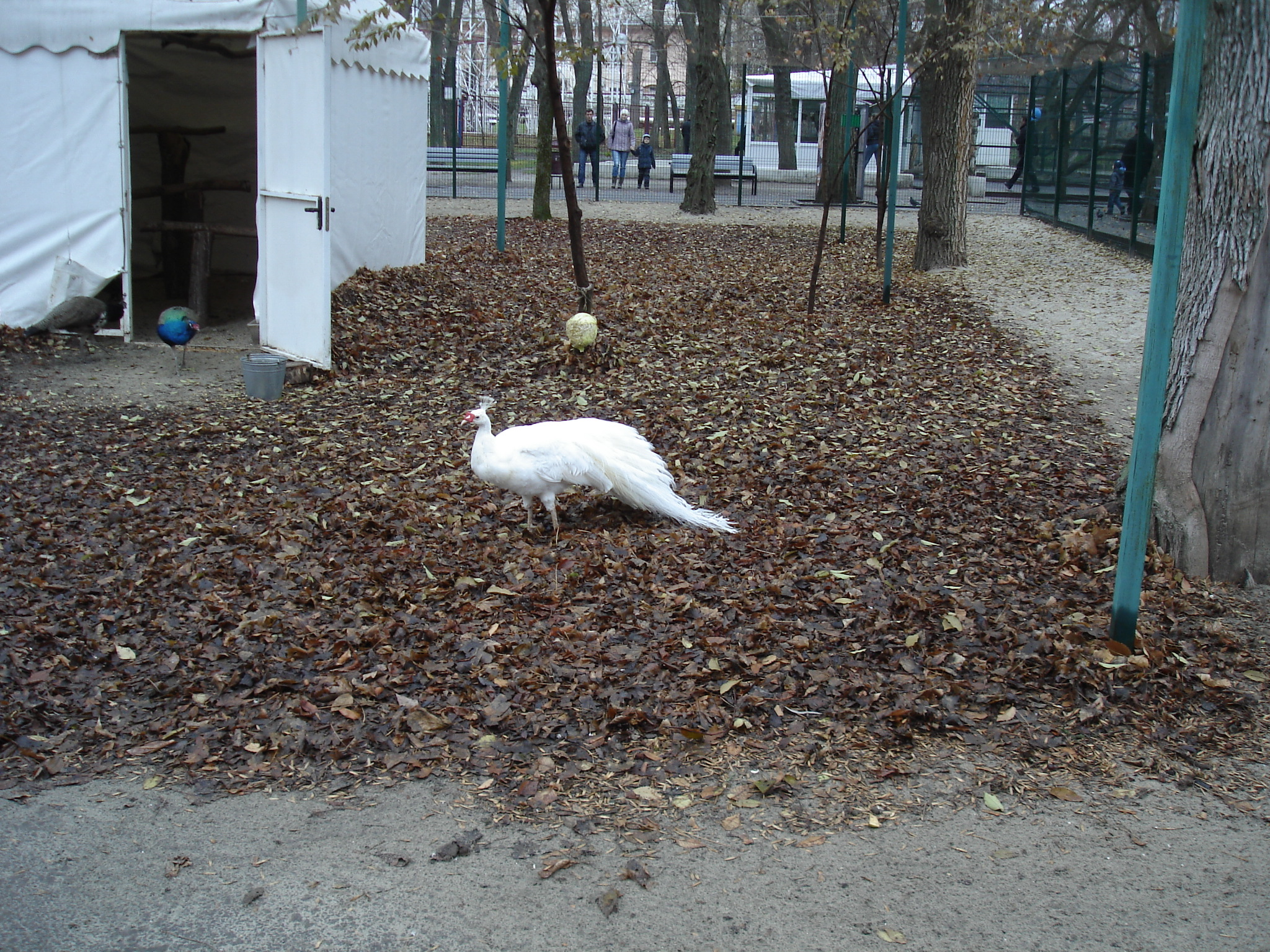
