= Efkleidis Kourtidis =

Pontic Greek genocide resistance fighter (1887–1937)

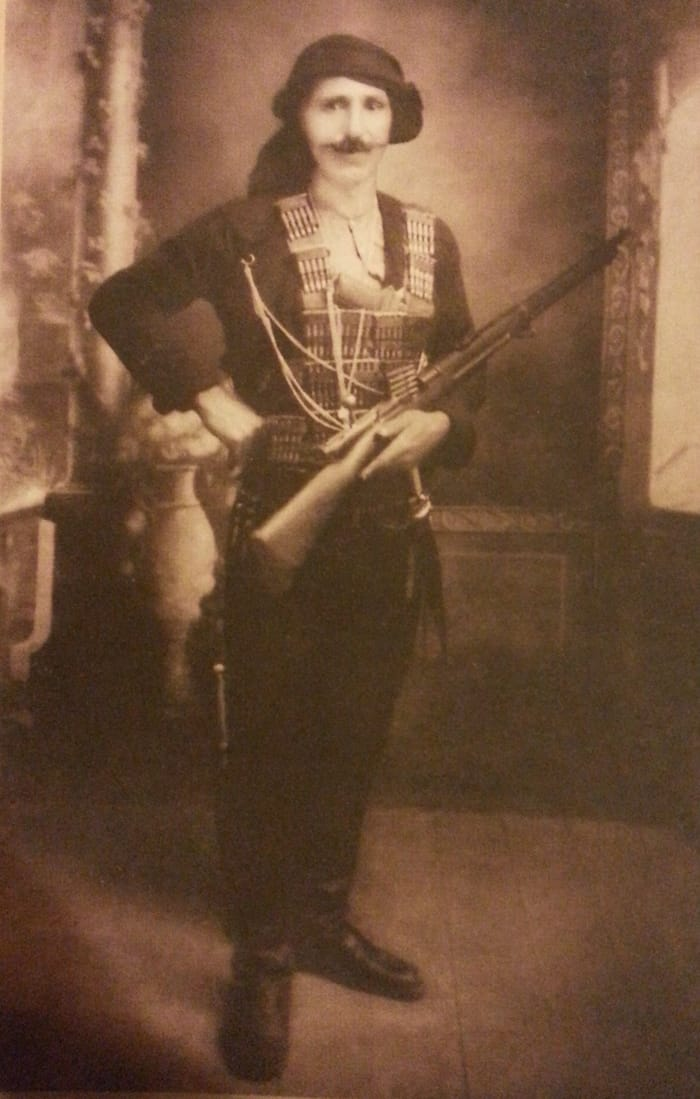
- Born: 1887; Santa, Ottoman Empire
- Died: 10 February 1937 (aged 50); Nea Santa, Kilkis, Greece
- Military career
- Allegiance: Pontic Greek resistance
- Nickname: Kapetan Efkleidis
- Conflicts: World War I; Pontic Greek genocide

Efkleidis Kourtidis (Pontic: Ευκλείδης Κουρτίδης; 1887–1937) was a Greek resistance leader of Pontos. An important leader in the Greek resistance during the Greek genocide, he fought Turkish troops from the Pontic Alps near Sanda.

== Life ==
He was born in the Ishanandon village of Sanda.

Kourtidis was the head of Greek guerrilla forces based in the town of Santa (Dumanlı), Pontos, that resisted Turkish bands. Kourtidis' struggle with the Turkish army was prolonged; his guerrillas refused to come down from the mountains. However, he was still able to send messages to people outside of Sanda, including the Metropolitan of Rodopolis. During the Pontic Greek Genocide (1912–1922) as part of the wider Greek genocide, he rescued a large number of women and children from the advancing Kemalist armies. They were finally transported safely to Greece.

His statue is erected in Nea Santa, Kilkis, Greece. The statue also bears the names of 141 known Greek genocide victims from Sanda. Upon his death in 1937, Kourtidis' friend wrote a song about him.
