= Asia Minor Defense Organization =

Greek nationalist organisation

Asia Minor Defense Organization Οργάνωση Μικρασιατικής Άμυνας
- Leaders: Chrysostomos of Smyrna, A. Athinogenis, S. Solomonidis, A. Psaltof, K. Tenekidis, Ch. Dimas
- Dates active: 1921–1922
- Headquarters: Smyrna
- Ideology: Greek nationalism Megali Idea; Independence of Ionia
- Wars: Greco-Turkish War (1919–1922)

The Asia Minor Defense Organization (Greek: Οργάνωση Μικρασιατικής Άμυνας, romanized: Organosi Mikrasiatikis Amynas), sometimes referred to simply as the Asia Minor Defense (Μικρασιατική Άμυνα, Mikrasiatiki Amyna) was a Greek nationalist organisation founded in 1921 during the final stages of the Greco-Turkish War (1919–1922). The Organisation's goal was the foundation of an autonomous or independent Greek state in Ionia in case the Greek campaign in Asia Minor proved to be a failure, as well as to protect the Ottoman Greeks of the region from Turkish atrocities, and to find a reasonable settlement to the question of the Smyrna Zone's fate. The Organisation was headquartered in Smyrna and was led by prominent Greek personalities of Ionia, including Metropolitan Bishop Chrysostomos of Smyrna, and even had branches in foreign cities. Following the Greek Army's defeat in Asia Minor and the subsequent destruction of the Greek quarter and community of Smyrna, the Organisation ceased to exist.
