= Santa, Georgia =

Village in Georgia

Coordinates: 41°39′02″N 44°00′53″E

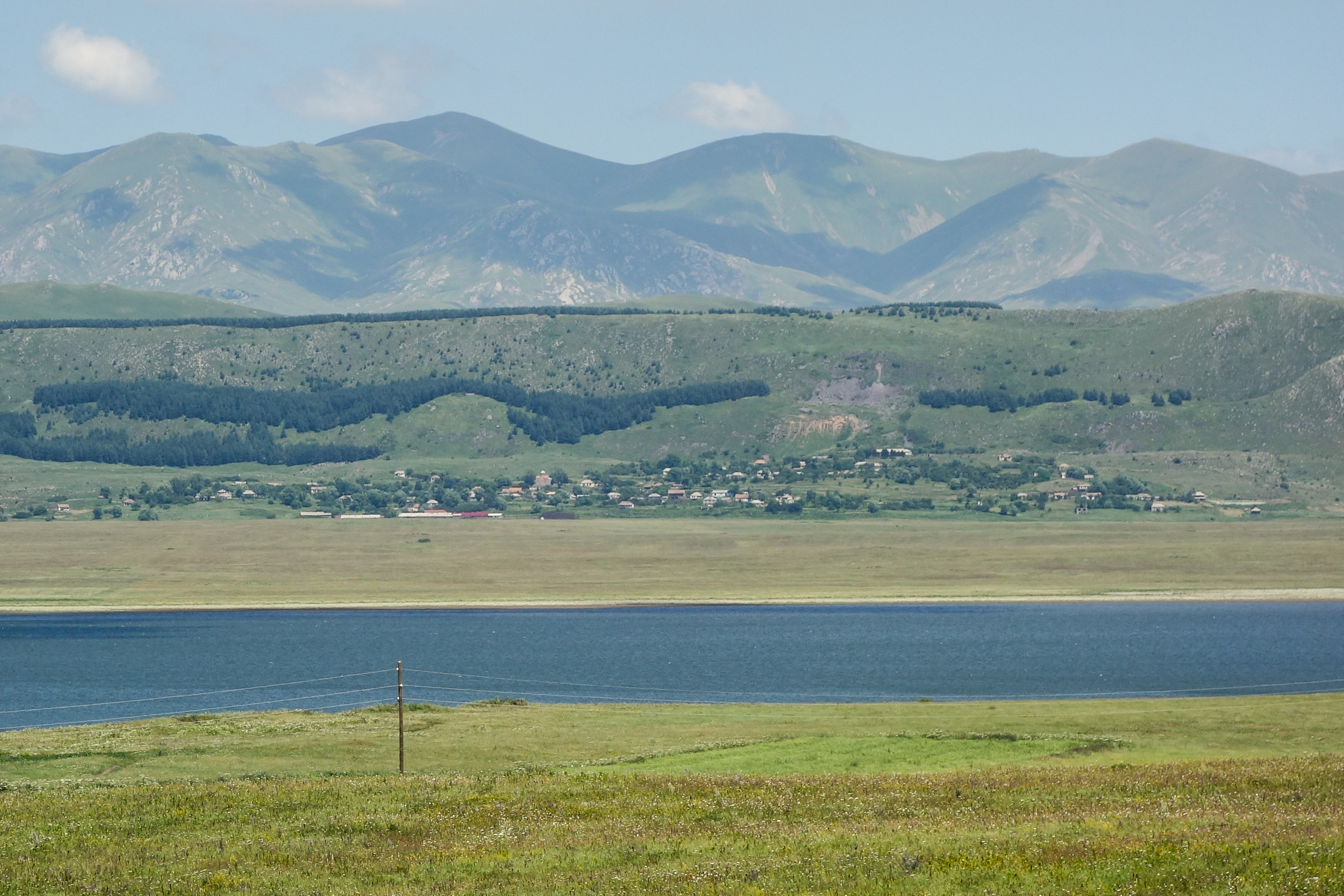
Village Santa on the shores of the Santa Lake, 2016.

Santa (Georgian: სანთა) is a village in Georgia, in Tsalka municipality.

== Description ==
Ancient stone tombs have been found in the village. The village is located near the Santa Lake.

The village was founded in 1835 and originally settled by Greeks, who have since emigrated elsewhere. Currently, only Georgians remain in the village.

Notable former residents include Ivan Savvidis, a Santa-born billionaire.

== Demographics ==
Year	Polulation	Men	Women
2002	84		
2014	39	18	21

== See also ==
- Kvemo Kartli
