= Caucasus Front (Russian Republic) =

Major formation of the army of the Russian Republic

The Caucasus Front (Russian: Кавказский фронт) was a major formation of the army of the Russian Republic (the successor to the Imperial Russian Army) during the First World War. It was established in April 1917 by reorganization of the Russian Caucasus Army and formally ceased to exist in March 1918.

== Creation ==
The reorganization of the Caucasus Army into the Caucasus Front was undertaken by the Russian Provisional Government as part of the military reforms following the February Revolution. During its entire year of existence, the Front was in a process of disintegration as revolutionary propaganda, the weakening of military discipline, desertion, and disease sapped the Front's strength.

General Yudenich was the commander of the Front at its creation. On May 31, 1917, he was removed for refusing to obey the Provisional Government's orders to resume offensive operations against the Turks, and was replaced by General Przhevalsky.

=== Composition ===
- Caucasus Army
  - 5th Caucasian Army Corps
    - other separate formations
  - 2nd Turkestani Army Corps
    - other separate formations
  - 1st Caucasian Army Corps
    - other separate formations
  - 6th Caucasian Army Corps
    - other separate formations
  - 4th Caucasian Army Corps
    - other separate formations
  - 2nd Caucasian Horse Corps
    - other separate formations
  - 1st Caucasian Horse Corps
    - other separate formations
- Additional Front components
  - Trapezund Fortified District
    - other separate formations
  - Kars Fortress
    - other separate formations
  - Alexandropol Fortress
    - other separate formations
  - Reserve
    - other separate formations

== Truce and dissolution ==
On December 5 1917 the Armistice of Erzincan was signed between the new Soviet government of Russia and the Turkish Third Army, formally ceasing fighting in the Caucasus. Nevertheless, the Turks continued some offensive operations, taking advantage of the fact that the Caucasus Front had effectively ceased to exist as a cohesive military force. Such resistance as the Turks met was offered by Armenian volunteer militia units. This was followed on March 3, 1918 by the Treaty of Brest-Litovsk ending all hostilities with the Turks.

Since the Caucasus Front dissolved, it did not have a true successor organization. The Army of the North Caucasus, which was renamed 11th Army on October 3, 1918, constituted the main Soviet army in the area during the Russian Civil War.

== Sources ==
- Peter Kenez (1971). Civil war in South Russia, 1918: the first year of the Volunteer Army. University of California Press. ISBN 978-0-520-01709-2.

== See also ==
- Caucasian Front electoral district (Russian Constituent Assembly election, 1917)

== See also ==
- List of Imperial Russian Army formations and units
