= Central Army =

Central Army may refer to:

- Central Army (Japan), an active army of the Japan Ground Self-Defense Force
- Central Army (Turkey), a field army of the Army of the Grand National Assembly during the Turkish War of Independence
