= Topal Osman =

Turkish officer and militia leader

Hacı Topal Osman Ağa
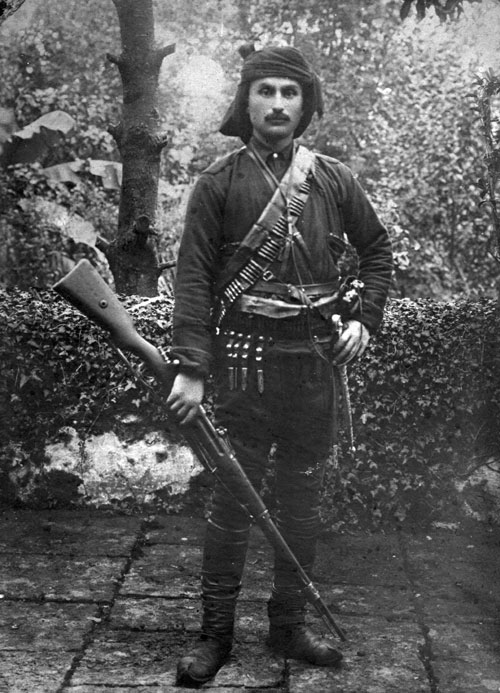
- Born: Feridunzade Osman; 1883; Giresun, Ottoman Empire
- Died: April 2, 1923 (aged 39–40); Ankara, Ankara Government
- Cause of death: Execution by shooting
- Years active: 1912–1923
- Known for: Militia leader, volunteer army commander, Mustafa Kemal's personal guard, perpetrator of the Greek and Armenian genocides, assassin of Ali Şükrü Bey
- Military career
- Allegiance: Ottoman Empire, Ankara Government
- Branch: Kuva-yi Milliye, Turkish Land Forces
- Service years: 1912–1923
- Rank: Militia lieutenant colonel
- Unit: 47th Regiment
- Conflicts: Balkan Wars; Bulgarian Front; World War I; Caucasus campaign; Turkish War of Independence; Koçgiri rebellion; Greco-Turkish War; Battle of the Sakarya; Great Offensive
- Awards: Turkish Medal of Independence

Hacı Topal Osman (Note: English: Osman the Lame or Lame Osman) Ağa (1883 – 2 April 1923), was a Turkish officer, a militia leader of the National Forces, a volunteer regiment commander of the Turkish army during the Turkish War of Independence who eventually rose to the rank of lieutenant colonel, and was a perpetrator of the Armenian and Pontic genocides. Besides the Greeks and Armenians, he also terrorised the local Muslim population who opposed him.

He was the commander of Mustafa Kemal's special Bodyguard Regiment. He showed usefulness in the War of Independence, but in 1923, when it was decided that he was the instigator of Trabzon Deputy Ali Şükrü Bey's murder, he was detained. He was captured and injured during clashes with military police, but he was killed by İsmail Hakkı Tekçe.

== Early life and Balkan Wars ==
He was born in Giresun in 1883 and was of Turkish origin, more particularly the Chepni tribe. His father, Feridûnzâde Hacı Mehmed Efendi, was a hazelnut merchant. In his youth he helped with the family business and became a partner in a sawmill. He was known for his intelligence and determination, earning him the informal title of ağa ("lord") from his community. He later married and had two sons. Before the wars, Osman also worked as a boatman and owned a coffee shop in Giresun. Despite his father's offered paying the exemption fee of 45 golden liras, he refused to stay and joined the First Balkan War with his 65 friends, where they fought in Çorlu. He was wounded on 18 November 1912 near Çorlu during an assault against Bulgarian forces, when shrapnel struck his right kneecap. He insisted on being operated on without anaesthesia rather than have his leg amputated, causing him to become lame (Turkish: topal).

== World War I ==
While still limping, Osman Ağa joined World War I with 93 friends, later joined by 6 prisoners in Trabzon. They charged the Russian army, causing many casualties for the Russians but also the death of 6 friends of Osman Ağa. During the war, he caught typhoid, leading to him returning to Giresun. After recovering, he returned to the war. He joined the 37th Division in Bayburt, which eventually retreated to Harşit. The Russians couldn't go any further. Osman Ağa returned to Giresun to recruit more soldiers and went back to fight with 1500 young volunteers. After the October Revolution took place, the Russians withdrew from the battle, leading the Turks to reconquer Batum. Osman Ağa's battalion was the first one to enter Batum.

After the fall of Trabzon to Russian forces on 17–18 April 1916, Osman and his band were used by Pirselimoğlu Hacı Hamdi Bey, commander of the Harşit front, to pursue military deserters and collect the war tax.

=== Armenian and Greek genocides ===
Topal Osman was known to have been responsible for massacres against Armenians and Greeks in the Pontus region where he was stationed during World War I and post-war years. While in Trabzon, Osman made a name for himself in the spring of 1915 as commander of a squadron of gangs. Osman, along with Ishak Çavuş, was known to have partaken in the drowning and massacres of the local Armenian population. During this time, Osman had also profited from the confiscation of assets and property belonging to the Armenians.

In the Giresun-Karahisar-i Şarki region, unlike the Samsun-Amasya area which had Greek guerrilla bands, the Greek Orthodox population was largely unprotected. This made them particularly vulnerable to Osman, who both blackmailed them and, for a high fee, illegally transported some to Russia on his boat.

In 1916, Osman and a band of men attacked a Pontian Greek farming village, named Prossori, in Trebizond Vilayet. The men raped village women, killed young men, stole what they wanted from the houses, and beat a priest to death. On threat of death, the surviving villagers had to sign a document saying that the attackers were Armenian.

In July 1916, Osman arrested a group of men whom he accused of attempting to flee Giresun by sea, charging them with espionage. He subsequently detained three wealthy Orthodox merchants on accusations of collaborating with the arrested men. One of them, Ioannis Deligiorgis, died in custody. As a result, Osman was court martialled, and served several months in prison.

Osman made similar attacks on Pontian Greeks after the war. In 1920, he and his men imprisoned all the Christian men of Giresun and held them for ransom. They raped the Christian women while their husbands and fathers were imprisoned. Every evening, Osman's team killed five or six prisoners.

In Çarşamba in 1921, Turks rounded up the Christian women. The majority were sent on a death march, while a selected minority of "good-looking women...were being held for the pleasure of the troops under Osman Ağa," according to an American observer serving aboard the USS Overton. Such attacks by Osman and his men were overt and frequent. An American serving aboard the USS Williamson spoke to a local man, who said that "what had happened made him ashamed to be a Turk." In Merzifon that same year, Osman and his men broke into Christians' houses at night, raping, killing, or kidnapping the inhabitants. They also stole what they wanted from the townspeople. Many Christians took shelter in the local French school; Osman's brigands abducted and raped the women and girls, killed the men and boys, and later burned the school. Osman's band abducted many women and girls as they left the town. Some Turkish townspeople took part in the attacks, while those sympathetic to their Christian neighbors found themselves unable to stop the slaughter. Osman later traveled to Trebizond and began robbing houses, but was driven off by a Turkish gangster called Yahya.

Again in 1921, Topal Osman and his men traveled to Giresun and nearby Tirebolu. The same pattern repeated: They killed or deported the majority of local Pontian Greeks, but selected some women and girls for the troops' use.

A local Greek survivor recalled that when his village was attacked in 1921 by Osman and his men, who were armed with guns and axes: "They gathered people in the middle of the village. They separated off the children. They stripped them and threw them into wells. Then they threw stones on top of them. The wells groaned. They filled the church, the school, and the barns with the old people and set fire to them."

In 1922, Osman led his men to Ordu. Few Christian men remained, but many women and children did. Osman and his men picked the women and girls they wanted from the crowd. They forced all the other Christians into two buildings, which they set on fire. Osman and his men raped the selected women throughout the night, then "butchered" them the next day. Osman's men did the same in nine nearby villages.

Foreign correspondents accused him as the principal organizer of the persecution against the Greeks at the Pontus region and also that he made a great fortune from the plundering of the churches. In addition, The Daily Telegraph's correspondent called him the "terror of the Pontus" adding that: "his career of crime and violence, for the equal of which one must go back to the Dark Ages".

According to an Ottoman administrator, Osman was infamous for murdering "10-15 Orthodox Christians a day". His activities against the Greeks were so brutal that even Adnan Bey sent a letter to the government in Ankara asking to take measures against Topal Osman. Andrew Mango, in his Atatürk's biography, described Osman as "a sadistic ethnic cleanser of Armenians and Greeks, and the hammer of Mustafa Kemal's Muslim opponents".

=== Clash with Anton Paşa ===
During the Greek resistance to the genocide, Anton Paşa, born Antonis Hacılefteryu (Greek: Αντώνης Χατζηελευθερίου), was an important Turkish-speaking Pontic Greek rebel and armed leader who operated in the Bafra/Samsun area and fought against Topal Osman.

Out of fear, Topal Osman and his men avoided fighting directly against Anton Paşa and instead put a 50,000 Ottoman lira reward on his head, while abducting his wife and taking her hostage, in hopes that Anton Paşa surrenders. However, instead of surrendering, he stormed the gendarmerie station in Bafra with a group of Pontic Greek partisans and took the soldiers hostage. He threatened to kill the soldiers and then burn Bafra if his wife was not freed. After this event, his wife was released from captivity. Anton Paşa was betrayed by two of his own men, who had been bribed, and ultimately killed in 1917, although his wife, Captain Pelagia, kept fighting until 1923.

== Turkish War of Independence ==
=== As the mayor of Giresun ===
After the First World War, Topal Osman Ağa continued his operations in the Black Sea region, this time targeting Christian Pontic Greeks.

In early 1919, the local Committee for the Defence of Rights (Müdâfaa-i Hukuk Cemiyeti) mandated him to take action against Greek (Rûm) guerrilla groups. At the same time, he was elected mayor of Giresun. He was later court martiallled in Istanbul for war crimes against Armenians and Greeks. To help his case, the city's mufti and other notables filed a petition falsely claiming that Armenians in Giresun had not been massacred. The Metropolitan of Giresun, Lavrentios (Papadopoulos), also sent a telegram to the Grand Vizier exonerating Osman. This was a move the governor of Trebizond, Mehmed Galib Bey, believed was insincere and motivated by Lavrentios's need for the support of powerful Muslims in local politics. Osman fled Giresun to avoid arrest. Osman and his men were later pardoned.

He sent a battalion, consisting of 1050 men from Ordu, Giresun, Görele, Tirebolu and Akçaabat, to Eastern Front but the battalion joined at the end of the fight. Nevertheless, the battalion stayed there for 4 months, ultimately to return to their home in January 1921.

According to non-Turkish reporters and historians, he was cruel towards Greek civilians. According to Mustafa Kemal's recent biographer Robert Shenk of the US Naval Institute, Topal Osman was a sadistic ethnic cleanser of Armenians and Greeks." Osman along with his militia forces, were responsible for massacres, deportations, destruction and confiscation of property, extortion, rapes and other atrocities throughout this region including the cities, towns and villages of Samsun, Marsovan, Giresun, Tirebolu, Ünye, Havza and Bulancak. He was however refused arms and cooperation by the government and inhabitants of Trabzon. According to Bruce Clark, it was because in Trabzon multicultural pro-Ottoman ideals were stronger due to inter-ethnic and religious family ties. According to Turkish historians, it was because of the tension between Osman Ağa, who wasn't obeying Trabzon and was taking orders only and directly from Mustafa Kemal, and the Trabzon governors, many of whom were pro-Ottoman who (as well as some others appointed from the GNA) believed Osman Ağa's activities would cause the Allies to occupy the Black Sea region. Together with his (alleged) subsequent murder of Trabzon deputy Ali Şükrü Bey (leader of the first Turkish opposition group in the GNA) this led to long standing animosity between the nationalist government of Mustafa Kemal and the population of Trabzon.

In January 1920, Osman began publishing a newspaper called Gedikkaya.

=== Guard platoon of Mustafa Kemal ===
Since there were no forces to protect the Grand National Assembly in Ankara, Ali Şükrü suggested formation of a guard platoon, which was accepted. Mustafa Kemal invited Topal Osman to Ankara. While in road, Osman Ağa destroyed a Greek band in Gerze and made another flee in İnebolu. Mustafa Kemal took 10 men from Osman Ağa to protect him. These guards prevented two assassinations against Mustafa Kemal, both carried by Çerkez Ethem. The guards were replaced by 20 new guards. Çerkez Ethem attempted a third assassination, which was prevented by these guards as well as Osman Ağa himself. Osman Ağa planned to kill Ethem later but was stopped by Kılıç Ali, who said to Osman Ağa that Mustafa Kemal wouldn't like it. Later, he met with and helped İpsiz Recep, another militia leader in the Black Sea region, mainly active in Rize. Another guard unit of 100 men were sent to Mustafa Kemal by Topal Osman.

=== 42nd and 47th Giresun Volunteers Regiments ===
Topal Osman, upon the order he received from Ankara, left the command of the guard unit to Gümüşreisoğlu Mustafa Kaptan in 1921 and went to Giresun. He formed two regiments consisting of volunteers. Volunteers also took part in the suppression of the Koçgiri Rebellion in March–April 1921. During the rebellion, the regiment commanded by Osman Ağa was named 47th Regiment and the other regiment, commanded by Hüseyin Avni Alparslan, was named 42nd Regiment.

He commanded the 47th Regiment during the Battle of the Sakarya. On his way, Osman Ağa and his regiment fought with Greek bands in Erbaa, Çakallı and Bafra. Osman Ağa's regiment was ambushed by Pontic bands in Havza and Merzifon, but ultimately destroyed by the regiment. During the war, almost all of the 42nd Regiment, lost their lives, including the commander Hüseyin Avni Alparslan. About 80–90 soldiers survived from the 42nd Regiment, who merged with 58th Regiment. 47th Regiment was ordered to capture a hill the army couldn't, but they didn't even have bayonets since they wore their traditional clothes. 47th Regiment attacked with their knives and succeeded to throw back Greeks, but sixty percent of them died. Of the dead from both regiments, 234 were managed to be identified. After the victory, Osman Ağa rose to the rank of lieutenant colonel and was honored with the Medal of Independence.

On 8 June 1922, by the Orders of National Taxes, Osman Ağa attempted to sell all his real estate to fund the army, but was prevented by the wealthy people of Giresun who said he "served enough" by joining the fight and all he has done.

Topal Osman joined the Great Offensive as the commander of the 47th Regiment, which was reinforced after the Battle of Sakarya. His forces captured a front, which Greeks claimed Turks couldn't capture even in 7 years, in 2 days. At least 14 soldiers died from the 47th Regiment. His forces entered Manisa, Turgutlu, Akhisar, Kırkağaç, Soma, Ayvalık and Edremit respectively. In Ayvalık, all Greek men between age 15–45 were sent as Amele Taburları to İvrindi. Almost all of them ending up dying. 47th Regiment later went to Balıkesir, where Osman Ağa, with help of local civilians, executed Greek bands for tormenting Turks there, no matter their age, as well as raping young girls. 47th Regiment eventually returned to Salihli. Osman Ağa stayed in Istanbul for a while, where a failed assassination attempt committed against him. On his way to Giresun, he burned 3 Pontic rebels to death. He was greeted with great enthusiasm in his hometown Giresun, when he returned on 21 December 1922.

According to some sources, Topal Osman (while other sources claim that this words belong to Nurettin Pasha) said:

In homeland (Turkey), we cleaned up people who say "zo" (Armenians), I'm going to clean up people who say "lo" (Kurds) by their roots.

== Later life and death ==
Osman Ağa was invited to Rize to the opening of a secondary school. After the opening was over and he returned to Giresun, he went to Ankara after he got a telegram. Osman got the information by Mustafa Kaptan that in the Grand National Assembly, there were heated discussions about the Lausanne Conference and Ali Şükrü was opposing Mustafa Kemal. Osman Ağa said he will talk to Ali Şükrü and persuade him to give up his opposition.

=== Murder of Ali Şükrü Bey ===
He was held responsible for the murder of deputy Ali Şükrü Bey, who suddenly disappeared on 27 March 1923 in Ankara. After the body was found in the vicinity of Mühye village on the Çankaya ridges on 1 April, an arrest warrant was issued for him. Mustafa Kaptan took Ali Şükrü from Kuyulu Kahve to Osman Ağa's house. Rauf Orbay, in his memoirs, claimed that Mustafa Kaptan confessed Ali Şükrü was murdered in Osman Ağa's house. However, during the trial, Kaptan said he knows nothing about the murder. A witness claimed she heard sounds of begging and screaming. Osman Ağa said to her that his two men were drunk and he punished them by beating. Kaptan and other guards from Giresun were released since there wasn't enough evidence.

Many have claimed that Topal Osman's men killed Ali Şükrü. The government also concluded that it was him. However, historian Ümit Doğan argues that it is not possible, because the murder is too amateur for him, and also because of the close friendship between Osman and Ali Şükrü grown during and after Battle of Sakarya. Doğan also claims that İsmail Hakkı Tekçe possibly killed him and left it on Topal Osman, as he did before in the murder of Yahya Kahya, which was stayed on Topal Osman until Tekçe's confession close to his death. Ali Şükrü's son Nuha Doruker as well claimed that it wasn't Topal Osman who killed his father.

=== Death ===
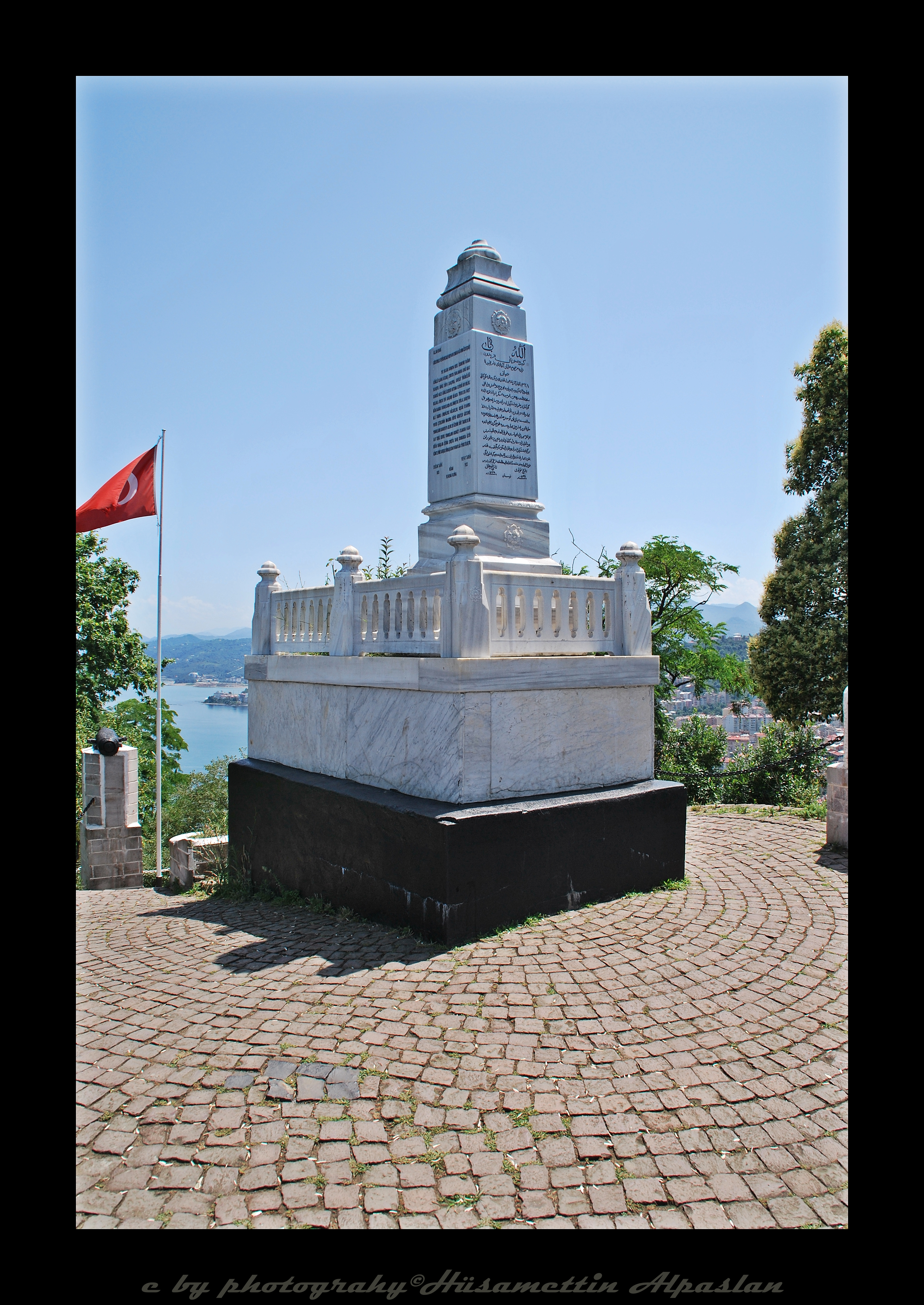
Topal Osman's mausoleum on the top of Giresun Castle

Topal Osman and his men, who were trapped in his house in Priest's Bound on the night of 1 April 1923, by the newly formed guard unit, clashed all night. Topal Osman was captured wounded. Later that day, under İsmail Hakkı's orders, he was executed by a shot to the head. Some claimed İsmail Hakkı cut Osman's head off but this is not true, as on the newspaper Tevhid-i Efkâr, 4 April 1923, it was written that Osman's head was leaned to back.

On 2 April, at the insistence of the "Second Group", his body was dug up and hung at the gate of the parliament building (today War of Independence Museum) for exhibition to the public. According to some sources, his decapitated corpse was hung in the Ulus Square. His body was buried on the top of Giresun Castle by the order of Atatürk in 1925, where he still rests.

== Legacy ==
Toktamış Ateş of Istanbul University claims that former Prime Minister Tansu Çiller had once promised to open a university in Topal's name.

A statue of him was erected in his home town of Giresun in 2007.
