= Havat Shikmim =

Coordinates: 31°30′42.44″N 34°38′1.06″E

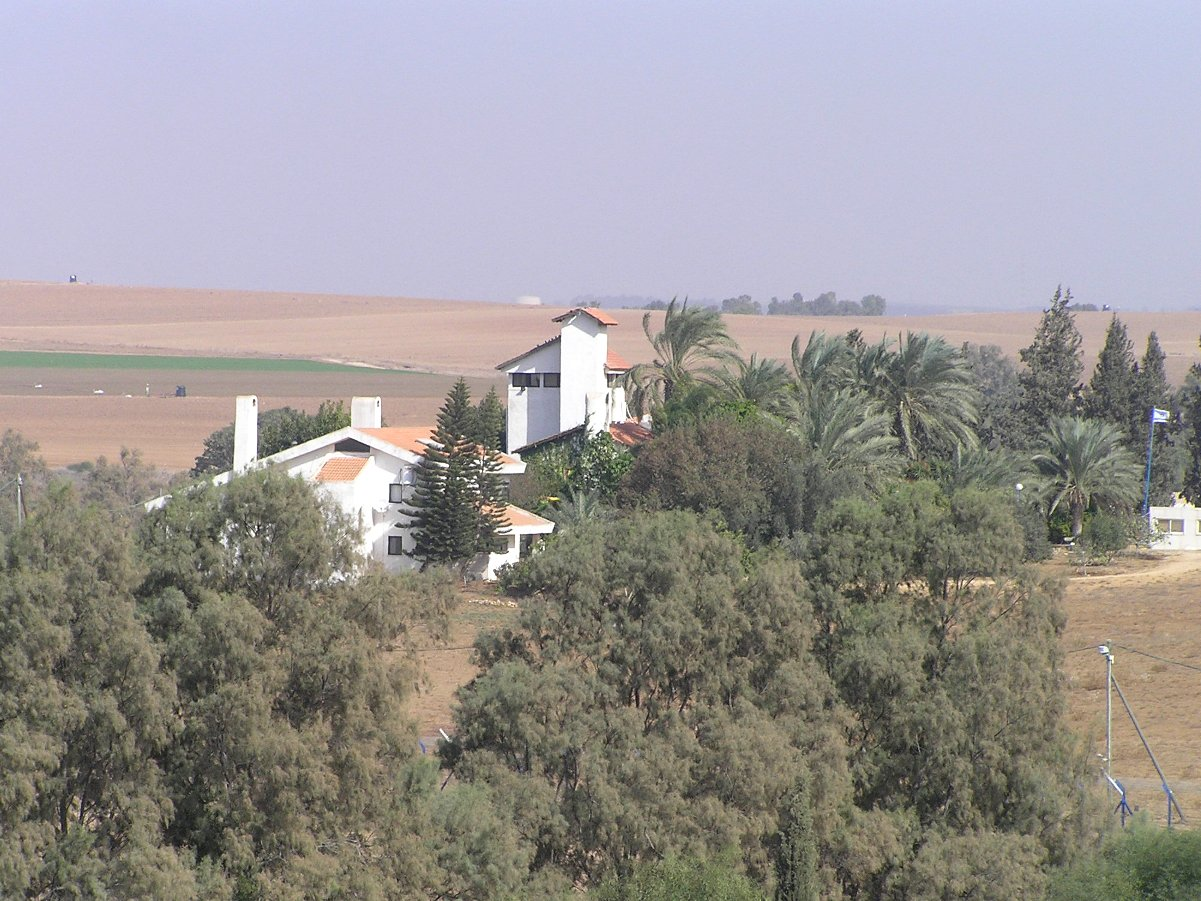
Havat Shikmim

Havat Shikmim (Hebrew: חוות שקמים, lit. "Sycamore Ranch") is a sheep ranch in Israel that belongs to the family of the late Prime Minister of Israel Ariel Sharon. It is located in the northern Negev Desert, near Sderot. The ranch covers 3,823 dunams (4 km²).

Sharon purchased the ranch in 1972 with the help of a loan from Meshulam Riklis. The ownership of the ranch was turned over to Sharon's sons Omri and Gilad, to avoid conflict of interest when Sharon became Agriculture Minister of Israel and Industry, Trade and Labour Minister of Israel.

The farm was built on the lands of a depopulated Arab village, Huj. According to Izzeldin Abuelaish the mosque of this village has been serving as the pen for Sharon's Arabian thoroughbred horses.

In 2007, the farm was hit by rocket fire from the Gaza Strip. One rocket exploded near a sheep barn.

In June 2010, the Israel Land Administration (ILA) renewed the ranch's lease for an additional 49 years at NIS142,000 per year. The ranch had been in limbo since 2003, when the ILA decided to verify if the ranch was using extra land not in its ownership.

Sharon and his second wife, Lily, are buried in Havat Shikmim.

== See also ==
- Agriculture in Israel
