= Dorot =

Kibbutz in southern Israel

Dorot: דּוֹרוֹת (Hebrew)
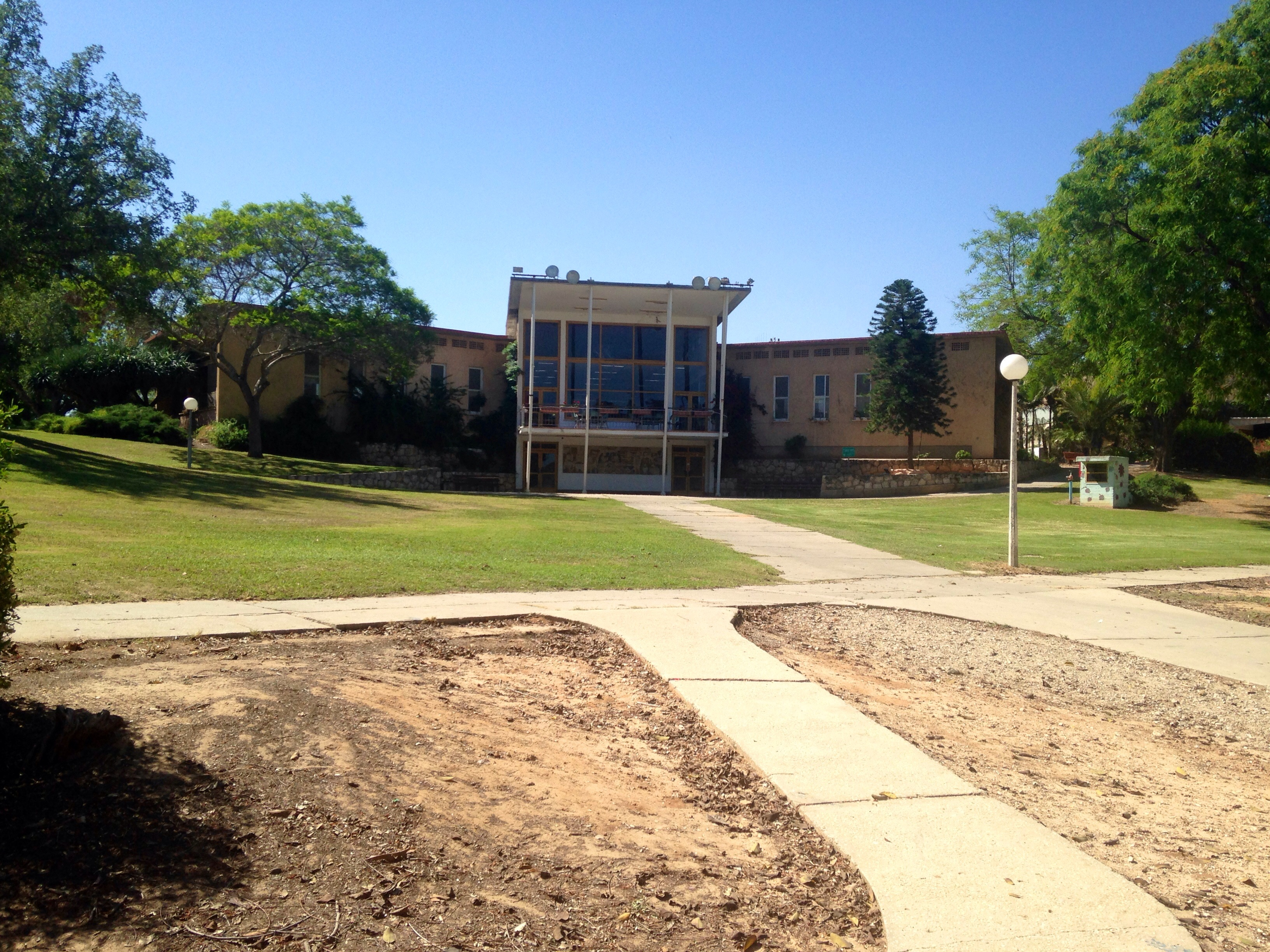

- Location within Northwest Negev region of Israel
- Coordinates: 31°30′23″N 34°38′43″E
- Country: Israel
- District: Southern
- Subdistrict: Ashkelon
- Council: Sha'ar HaNegev
- Affiliation: Kibbutz Movement
- Founded: 1941
- Founder: German Jews
- Population (2024): 886

Dorot (Hebrew: דּוֹרוֹת, lit. 'Generations') is a kibbutz in the Negev Desert in southern Israel. Located on Route 334 near Sderot, it falls under the municipal jurisdiction of the Sha'ar HaNegev Regional Council. In 2024 it had a population of 886.

== History ==
Dorot was established during Hanukkah in 1941 by Jewish refugees from Germany, who farmed grain, fruit trees, and vegetables. Soil erosion was a particular problem for the kibbutz. It was named after three members of the Hoz family, Dov, Rivka and Tirtza, who had died in a car accident the year before. The founders were later joined by native Israelis and immigrants from Czechoslovakia and Latvia. In 1947 it had a population of 300.

In the summer of 1946, Dorot and the neighbouring village of Ruhama were occupied by the British army. In their search for illicit arms in the village, the British troops inflicted considerable material damage on the village. During the 1948 Arab-Israeli war, and the battle for the Negev, Dorot was cut off and had to be supplied by air until it was liberated in October 1948.

After 1948, Dorot expanded onto land near the Arab village of Huj, which was depopulated during the 1948 Arab–Israeli War.

The Jewish National Fund established a forest on the settlement's land called the Pioneer Women's Forest, funded by donor contributions from the United States.

== Climate ==
Climate data for Dorot (1991–2020)
Month	Jan	Feb	Mar	Apr	May	Jun	Jul	Aug	Sep	Oct	Nov	Dec	Year
Record high °C (°F)	29.7 (85.5)	32.6 (90.7)	38.9 (102.0)	42.4 (108.3)	45.0 (113.0)	43.1 (109.6)	42.5 (108.5)	40.6 (105.1)	43.9 (111.0)	41.9 (107.4)	36.2 (97.2)	33.1 (91.6)	45.0 (113.0)
Mean daily maximum °C (°F)	17.9 (64.2)	18.9 (66.0)	21.8 (71.2)	26.0 (78.8)	29.4 (84.9)	31.5 (88.7)	33.1 (91.6)	33.5 (92.3)	32.3 (90.1)	29.8 (85.6)	25.1 (77.2)	20.2 (68.4)	26.6 (79.9)
Daily mean °C (°F)	12.9 (55.2)	13.5 (56.3)	15.7 (60.3)	18.9 (66.0)	22.2 (72.0)	24.9 (76.8)	26.9 (80.4)	27.4 (81.3)	26.1 (79.0)	23.6 (74.5)	19.2 (66.6)	14.9 (58.8)	20.5 (68.9)
Mean daily minimum °C (°F)	7.9 (46.2)	8.0 (46.4)	9.4 (48.9)	11.8 (53.2)	15.0 (59.0)	18.2 (64.8)	20.6 (69.1)	21.3 (70.3)	19.9 (67.8)	17.4 (63.3)	13.3 (55.9)	9.7 (49.5)	14.4 (57.9)
Record low °C (°F)	−2.8 (27.0)	0.2 (32.4)	1.3 (34.3)	3.3 (37.9)	7.7 (45.9)	11.2 (52.2)	15.8 (60.4)	16.8 (62.2)	12.5 (54.5)	10.1 (50.2)	3.2 (37.8)	2.0 (35.6)	−2.8 (27.0)
Average precipitation mm (inches)	110.9 (4.37)	74.7 (2.94)	43.3 (1.70)	8.1 (0.32)	2.9 (0.11)	2.3 (0.09)	0.0 (0.0)	0.0 (0.0)	0.1 (0.00)	17.9 (0.70)	45.0 (1.77)	93.7 (3.69)	398.9 (15.70)
Average precipitation days (≥ 1.0 mm)	8.2	7.0	4.6	1.5	0.5	0.1	0.0	0.0	0.0	1.9	4.0	6.8	34.6
Source: NOAA

== Notable people ==
- Eliyahu Moyal, Knesset member

== Historic photos ==
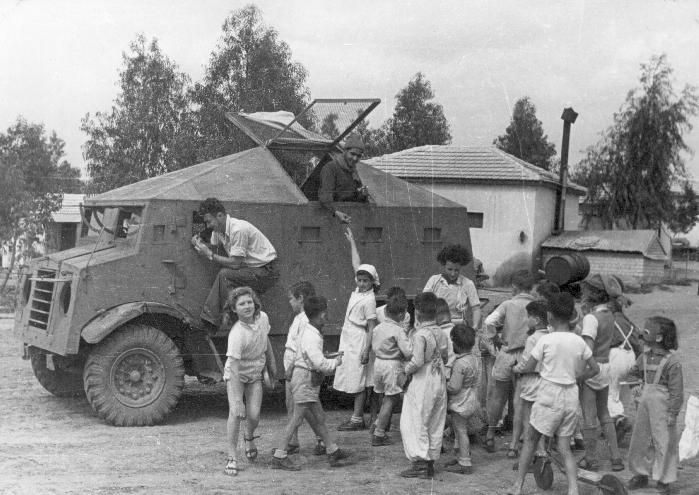
"Dorot" Kibbutz children evacuated by improvised Armored cars before expected Egyptian attack, 1948

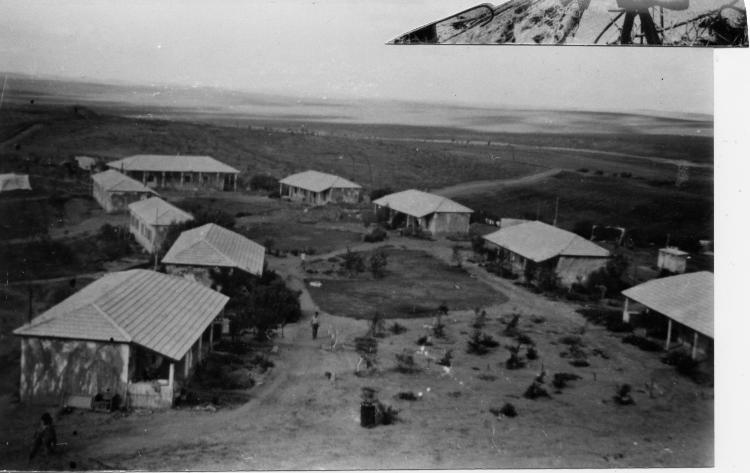
Yiftach 3rd Battalion Headquarters at Kibbutz Dorot in 1948

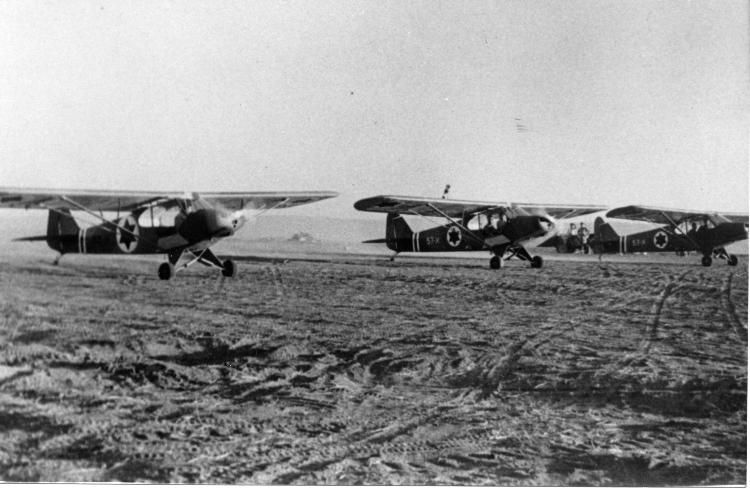
Dorot airfield in 1948
