= Koçgiri rebellion =

1921 Kurdish uprising against the Turkish state

- Part of Kurdish rebellions in Turkey and the Turkish War of Independence
Date	6 March 1921 – 17 June 1921
Location	Sivas, Tunceli, Erzincan
Result	Turkish victory

Belligerents
Turkey	Kurdish rebels: Atman tribe; Direjan tribe; Koçgiri tribe; Parçikan tribe; Pevizan tribe; Zerikan tribe; Society for the Rise of Kurdistan

Commanders and leaders
Mustafa Kemal Pasha; Nureddin Pasha; Topal Osman	Alişan Bey (surrendered); Alisher Efendi; Nuri Dersimi

Strength
Government claim: 3,161 men 1,350 military animals 2,750 rifles, 3 light and 18 heavy machine guns Rebel claim: 6,000 cavalrymen 25,000 infantrymen Unknown number of militia and Gendarmerie	Government claim: 3,000 rebels (mostly cavalry); 2,500 rifles Rebel claim: 6,000 rebels

Casualties and losses
	500 rebels killed 32 rebel leaders and 500 rebels captured
- c. 1,000 Kurdish civilians killed Many Kurdish women and girls raped 1,703 Kurdish households destroyed 132 Kurdish villages burned 107 Kurdish villages completely destroyed

The Koçgiri rebellion (Kurdish: Serhildana Qoçgiriyê; Turkish: Koçgiri isyanı) was a Kurdish uprising, that began in the overwhelmingly militant Koçgiri region in present-day eastern Sivas Province in February 1921. The rebellion was initially Alevi, but it succeeded in gathering support from nearby Sunni tribes. The tribal leaders had a close relationship with the Society for the Rise of Kurdistan (SAK). The rebellion was defeated in June 1921.

After the rebellion, massacres, rapes and other crimes against Kurds began being committed by the Turkish Army and Topal Osman's paramilitaries.

== Background ==
After the Treaty of Sèvres was signed the Kurds began to feel more trustful that they were able to reach at least some sort of an autonomous government for themselves. Abdulkadir Ubeydullah, the son of Sheikh Ubeydullah and the president of the SAK, supported the idea of a Kurdish autonomy within Turkey. But Nuri Dersimi and Alisher Efendi wanted more than autonomy, they wanted to establish an independent Kurdistan according to article 64 of the treaty. Mustafa Kemal followed up on the events in the Dersim area and as it came to his knowledge that some of the Kurds were pursuing autonomy in line with the fourteen points announced by US president Woodrow Wilson, he answered that the plan of Wilson was worthless for the peoples in the eastern provinces and they should rather follow his Turkish nationalist movement.

== Negotiations ==
The Kurds around Dersim began to prepare for an eventual showdown with the Turkish nationalists and they also raided several Turkish weapon depots. By October 1920 they captured enough to feel themselves in a position of strength and Alisan Bey, the leader of Refahiye prepared the tribes for independence. Finally, on the 15 November 1920, they delivered a declaration to the Kemalists which stated the following.

- The Government in Ankara should abide by the agreement the Kurds had with the Sultan in Istanbul and accept the Kurdish autonomy
- The Government in Ankara should also inform the people who wrote the declaration concerning their approach towards an autonomous Kurdistan.
- All the Kurdish prisoners in the prisons of Erzincan, Malatya, Elaziz (today Elazıĝ) and Sivas shall be released.
- The Turkish administration in the areas with a Kurdish majority must leave
- And the Turkish military which was dispatched to the Kurdish areas, should withdraw

They requested an answer by 24 November 1920. On the 25 December, the Kurds again demanded more political rights to be given to them in the Provinces of Diyarbakir, Bitlis, Van and Elaziz as agreed on in the Treaty of Sèvres. The Kemalists at first listened to their demands for more political freedom, but at the same time moved significant troops to the region in order to quell the rebellion. Nevertheless, the Turkish Government tried to deceive the Kurds as they sent the Governor of Elaziz to Pertek in order to assure them that Mustafa Kemal agreed to the requests. Mustafa Kemal even nominated additional members of parliament from the region. The Turkish Government also offered to assign a Kurdish Mütessarif to the region, but the revolutionaries represented by Seyit Riza and Alişan Bey (official from the Refahiye) refused the offer, and repeated their demand that they want an independent Kurdish government and not one imposed by Ankara. According to Michael Rubin, "it would be a mistake to retroactively attribute nationalistic motives to the Kuchgiri rebellion."

== The revolt ==
Following this response, Mustafa Kemal ordered the arrest of Nuri Dersimi and on the 20 December he was detained and brought to prison.

The commander of the Central Army Nureddin Pasha sent a force of some 3,000 cavalrymen and irregulars including Topal Osman's battalions. By February fighting between parties began and the Turks demanded the unconditional surrender of the Kurdish revolutionaries. A first major encounter between the factions ended victorious for the Kurds, but fighting went on and the rebels were crushed by June 17, 1921.

== Atrocities ==
After the rebellion, massacres, rapes and other crimes against Kurds began being committed by the Turkish Army. Although hard data on the number of Kurdish civilians killed is lacking, there is reliable evidence from a parliamentary commission of inquiry. It is estimated that the number of Kurdish civilians killed is around 1,000. In addition, there were widespread reports of mass rape of many Kurdish women by the Turkish Army.

In a May 31, 1921 report, Sivas governor Ebubekir Hâzım Tepeyran reported that "132 villages were burned and devastated, hundreds of people killed, their goods and livestock plundered, and that many villagers, frightened by the repression, took refuge in the mountains, where they died of starvation and misery". At the demand of the Kurdish members of the Grand National Assembly, a parliamentary commission of inquiry (Koçgiri Tahkikat Heyet) was set up. It reported that "1703 Kurdish households and 107 villages were completely destroyed by the military and paramilitary forces involved in the campaign". It also stated that "[s]oldiers were officially instructed to take possession of the whole properties, from livelihood to livestock to the valuables of the Kurds living in the region of insurgency". The report added that many Kurdish women and underage girls had been raped. The brutality of the actions of the Turkish forces shocked even some members of the Ankara's national assembly. One of the representatives said: "African barbarians would not even accept such excesses".

The report advised that "two key executors of the mass violence", Nureddin Pasha and Topal Osman, should be prosecuted for the crimes they committed in the region. However, Mustafa Kemal prevented this from happening and took both under his protection. He promoted Nureddin Pasha to the Supreme Military Council and later made him a member of the Turkish parliament, whilst also giving Topal Osman the position of aide-de-camp of the president.

Before repressing the rebels, Nureddin Pasha said (according to some sources, this statement belongs to Topal Osman):

In homeland (Turkey), we cleaned up people who say "zo" (Armenians), I'm going to clean up people who say "lo" (Kurdish) by their roots.

— Turkish original, Türkiye'de (Memlekette) "zo" diyenleri (Ermenileri) temizledik, "lo" diyenlerin (Kürtlerin) köklerini de ben temizleyeceğim.
