= 1st Mounted Brigade =

1st Mounted Brigade may refer to:

- 1st (1st South Midland) Mounted Brigade, designation given to the 1st South Midland Mounted Brigade while serving with the 2nd Mounted Division in the Gallipoli Campaign
- 1st Mounted Brigade (United Kingdom), also known as 2/1st Highland Mounted Brigade
- 1st Mounted Brigade (Canada)
