= XXV Corps (Ottoman Empire) =

XXV Corps Yirmi Beşinci Kolordu
- Active: 1918–
- Country: Ottoman Empire
- Type: Corps
- Garrison/HQ: Constantinople (present day: Istanbul)
- Patron: Sultans of the Ottoman Empire
- Engagements: Occupation of Constantinople

Commanders
- Notable commanders: Mirliva Nureddin Pasha (December 30, 1918)-January 2, 1919; Mirliva Ali Sait Pasha (October 6, 1919 – March 16, 1920

The XXV Corps of the Ottoman Empire (Turkish: 25 nci Kolordu or Yirmi Beşinci Kolordu) was one of the corps of the Ottoman Army. It was formed in Constantinople, Dersaâdet (present day: Istanbul) after the Armistice of Mudros.

== Formations ==
=== Order of Battle, November 1918 ===
In November 1918, the corps was structured as follows:

- XXV Corps (Constantinople, Dersaâdet)
  - None

=== Order of Battle, January 1919 ===
In January 1919, the corps was structured as follows:

- XXV Corps (Constantinople, Dersaâdet)
  - 1st Division (İzmit)
    - 70th Infantry Regiment, 71st Infantry Regiment, 124th Infantry Regiment
  - 10th Division (Constantinople, Dersaâdet)
    - 30th Infantry Regiment, 31st Infantry Regiment, 32 Infantry Regiment
