= Ali Şükrü Bey =

Ottoman politician

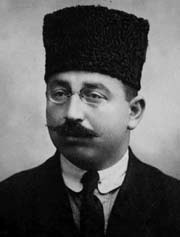
Ali Şükrü Efendi as a member of the 1st Parliament of the Grand National Assembly of Turkey

Ali Şükrü Bey (Ottoman Turkish: علی شكری بگ, romanized: ‘Alî Şükrî Beg; 1884, Beşikdüzü, Trebizond vilayet - 27 March 1923, Ankara) was a Turkish soldier, journalist, and politician.

== Life ==
He took part as the 6th term deputy of the Ottoman Parliament and as the 1st term deputy of the Grand National Assembly of Turkey from Trabzon. He was recognized as the deputy who put forward the strongest opposition to Mustafa Kemal Pasha in the 1st Parliament. He supported Ittihadists against the Abdülhamid II. He was assassinated in 1923. His friends charged the Turkish government with his murder and said it was a political assassination; the government denied it. Topal Osman was indicted as the assassin. Turkish military police wounded Osman and killed several of his men in a clash the following month. Later that day, Osman was summarily executed.

Ali Şükrü's murder is known as one of Turkey's first political assassinations.

== Gallery ==
Portrait of Ali Şükrü Bey

Ali Şükrü Bey

Colored portrait of Ali Şükrü Bey

== See also ==
- Ziya Hurşit
- List of members of the Grand National Assembly of Turkey who died in office
