= Huj, Gaza =

Huj هوج al-Hug, Hojj, Houg
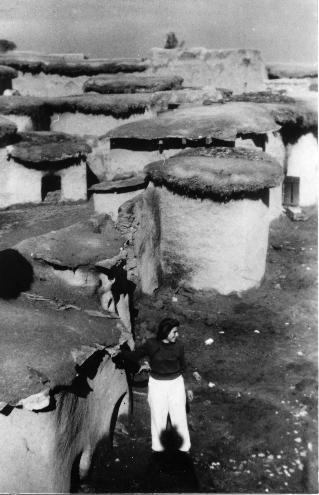
- Huj in 1948
- Etymology: Possibly named after the prophet Og
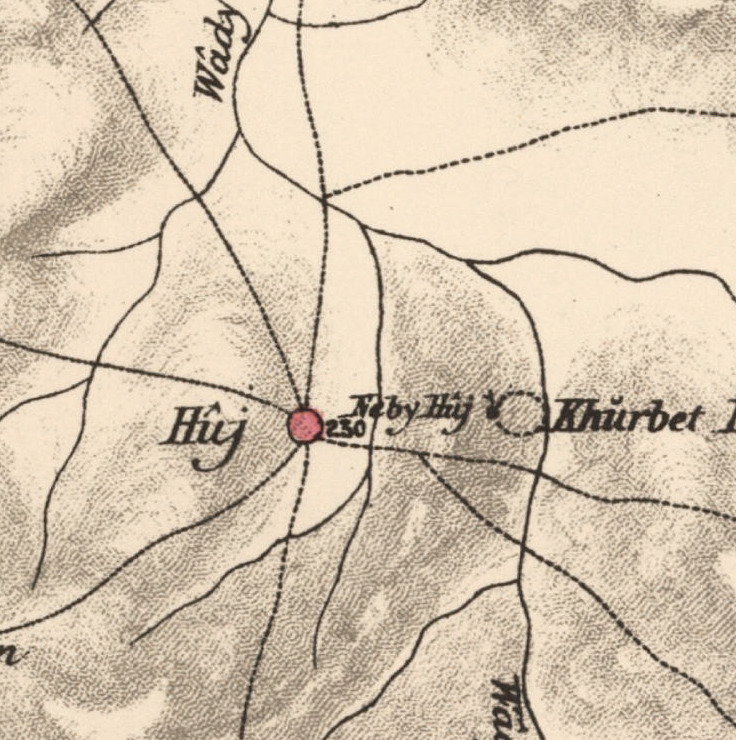
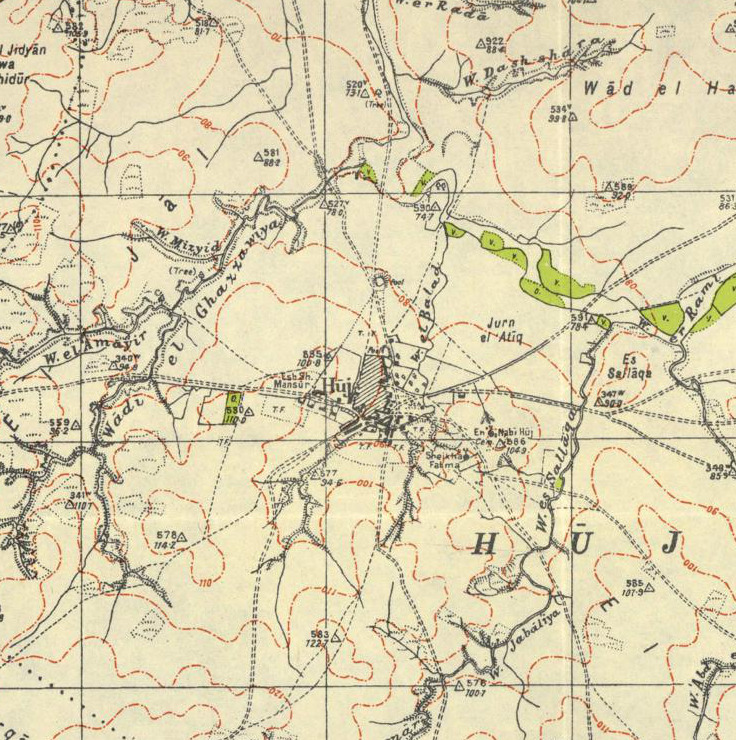
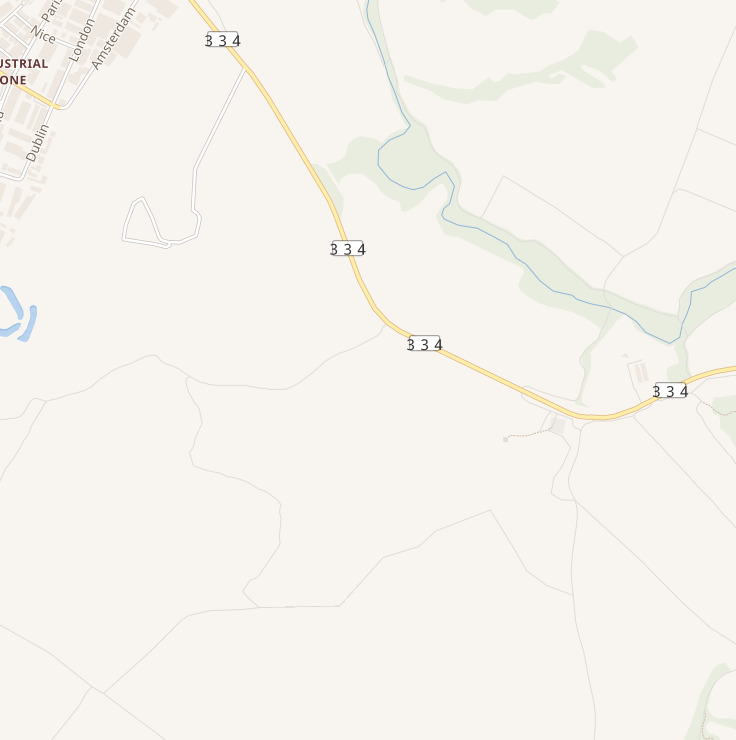
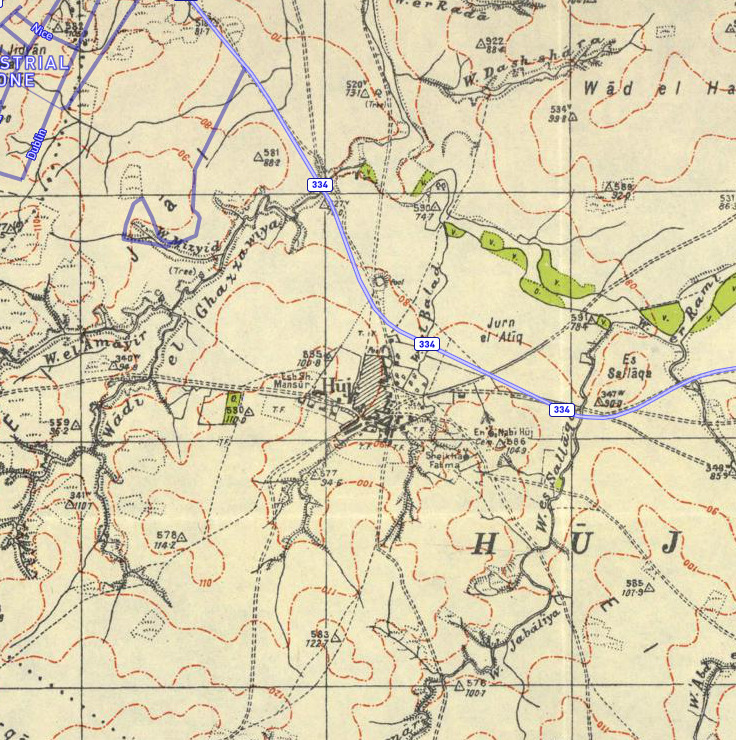
- 1870s map 1940s map modern map 1940s with modern overlay map A series of historical maps of the area around Huj, Gaza (click the buttons)

- Location within Mandatory Palestine
- Coordinates: 31°30′41″N 34°37′21″E
- Palestine grid: 114/102
- Geopolitical entity: Mandatory Palestine
- Subdistrict: Gaza
- Date of depopulation: May 31, 1948

Area
  - Total: 22.9 km^{2} (8.8 sq mi)

Population (1945)
  - Total: 810
- Cause(s) of depopulation: Expulsion by Yishuv forces
- Current Localities: Dorot Havat Shikmim

Huj (Arabic: هوج) was a Palestinian Arab village located 15 kilometers (9.3 mi) northeast of Gaza City. Identified as the site of the ancient Philistine town of Oga, the modern village was founded by the Ottomans in the early 19th century.

Situated in a hilly area on the northern edge of the Negev Desert, it was depopulated during the 1948 Arab-Israeli War.

== History ==
Architectural remains from the Iron Age, Persian and Hellenistic eras have been found here.

Identified with the Philistine town of Oga, it is notable for being depicted on the 6th century Map of Madaba. Six tombs from the Byzantine era have been excavated.

Remains from the Umayyad era have also been found here.

=== Ottoman era ===
The modern village of Huj was established sometime between 1818 and 1820 by Mustafa Bey, the Ottoman Governor of Gaza and Jaffa. He built a police station to keep the village secure, and offered free land to encourage migration to the site from Gaza from amongst the surrounding Bedouin tribes. Huj and its greater vicinity were dominated by the tribes of Jebarat and Wahaideh, the latter of which participated in the 1834 rebellion against Egyptian rule. The rebellion was suppressed and most of the Wahaideh were killed, imprisoned, or forced to work the lands, while the rest fled the area.

It was later resettled by fellahin from Gaza.

In 1838, Edward Robinson noted it as Muslim village, located in the Gaza district. He further observed that its houses were built of adobe and that the population ranged from 200 to 300, most of whom made a living through grain cultivation and bread making.

In 1863 the French explorer Victor Guérin visited the village. He described as a village of at most three hundred people. The houses were roughly built with mud bricks. Near the well, which was very deep, were a few fragments of ancient columns of gray-white marble lying on the ground.

An Ottoman village list from about 1870 found that Huj had a population of 153, in 63 houses, though the population count included men, only.

In 1883, the PEF's Survey of Western Palestine described it as a "small mud village on flat ground. It has a well some 200 feet deep. It is named from Nebi Huj".

=== British mandate era ===
Huj witnessed battles between Ottoman and British forces known as the Charge at Huj in 1917. Following Great Britain's victory and the establishment of the British Mandate in Palestine, Huj expanded eastward and to the west. Water was provided by a 200-foot-deep (61 m) well, and by other wells in surrounding riverbeds. The inhabitants cultivated grains, apricots, figs, grapes, and almonds.

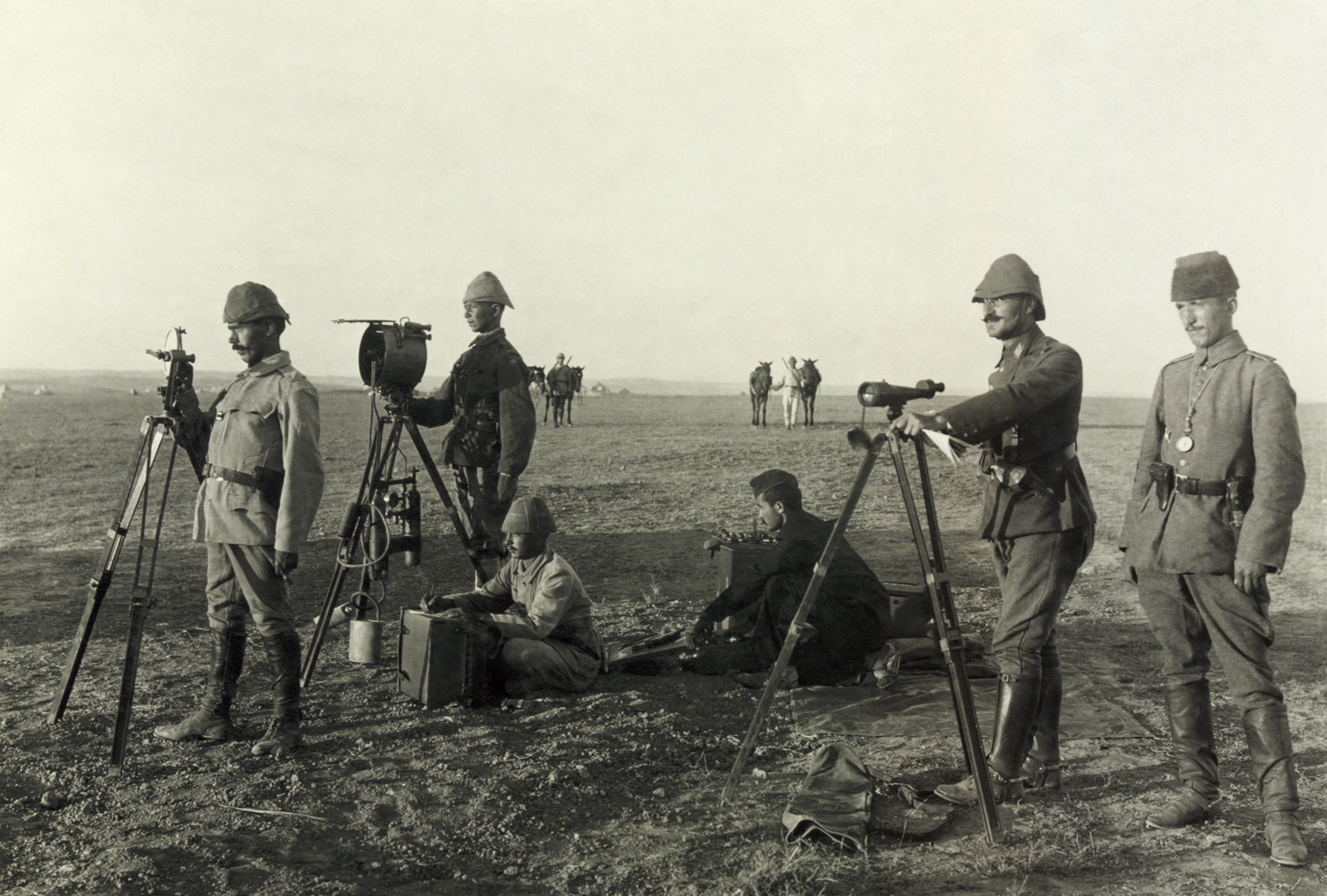
Ottoman heliograph crew at Huj during World War I, 1917

In the 1922 census of Palestine, conducted by the British Mandate authorities, Huj had a population of 426 inhabitants, all Muslims, increasing in the 1931 census to 618, still all Muslims, in 118 houses.

In the 1945 statistics the population of Huj was counted with that of the nearby Jewish kibbutz Dorot, together they had a population of 810 Muslims and 230 Jews, with a total of 21,988 dunams of land, according to an official land and population survey. Of this, Arabs used 93 dunams for plantations and irrigable land, 16,236 for cereals, while they had 34 dunams as built-up land.

Huj was a village with traditions of friendship with Jews: in 1946, men from the Haganah, being pursued in a crackdown by the British army, were given sanctuary by its inhabitants. Only after the passage of the United Nations Partition Plan for Palestine in late November 1947 did relations sour and the mukhtar and his brother were shot on the charge that they were collaborators.

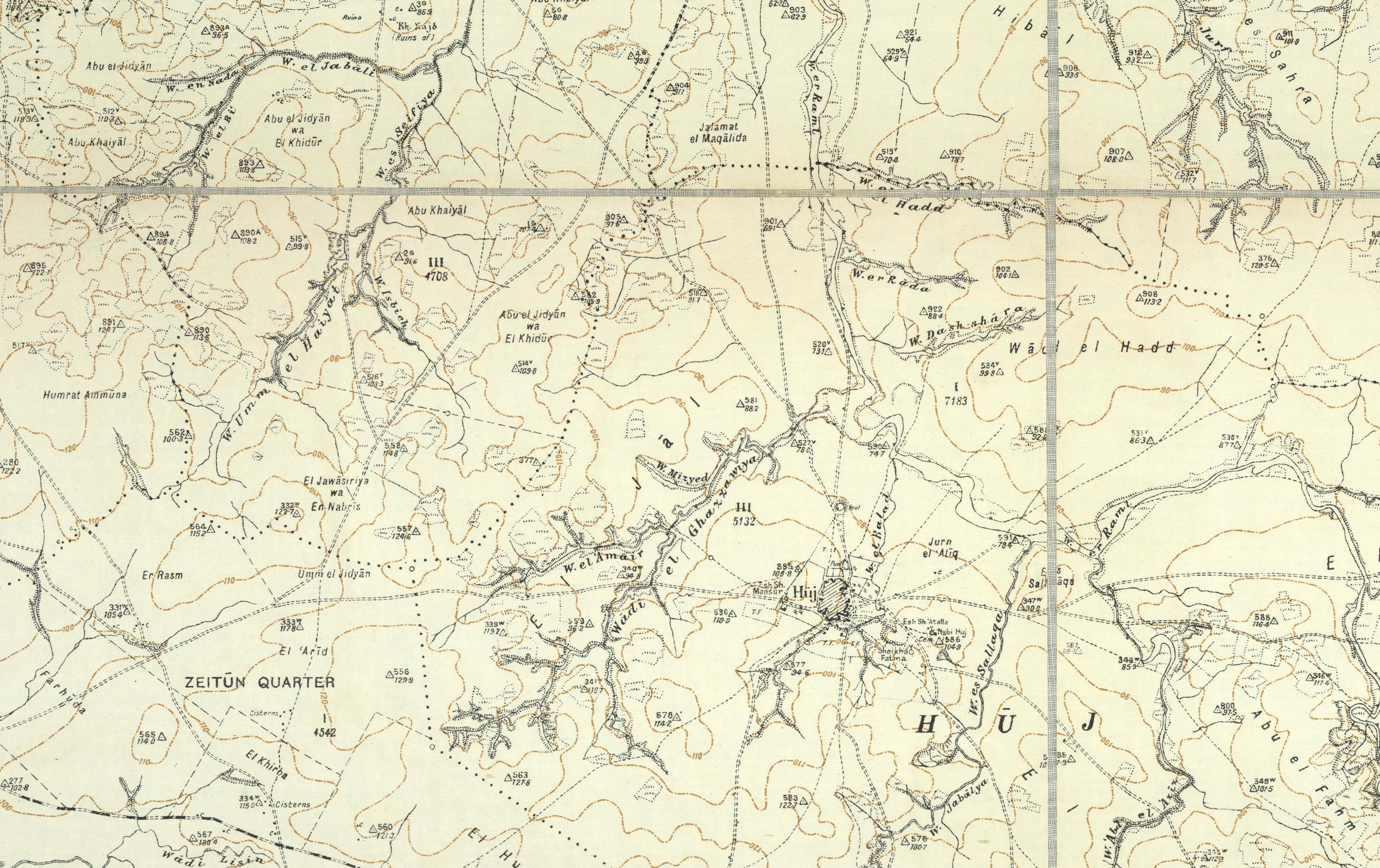
Huj 1931 1:20,000

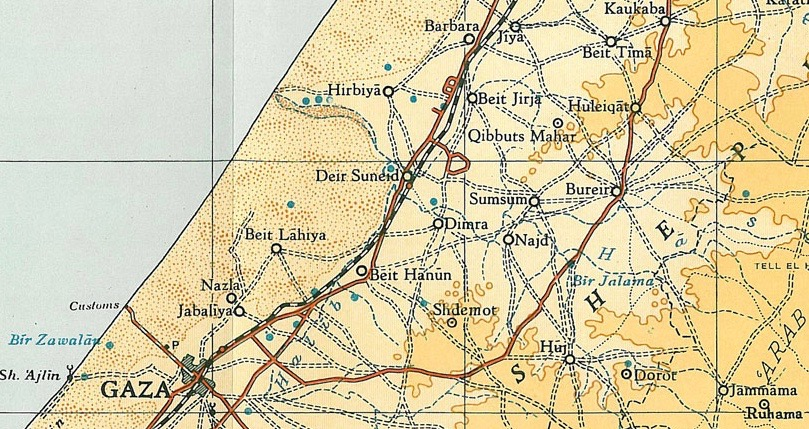
Huj 1945 1:250,000

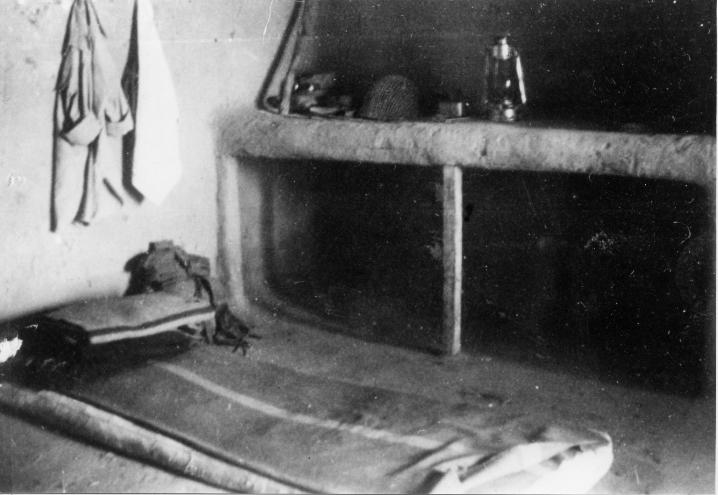
Domestic interior. Huj. 1948

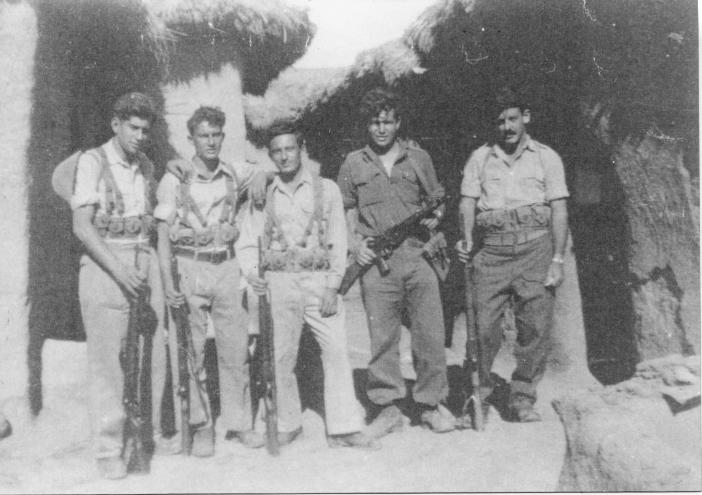
Yiftach Brigade in Huj. 1948

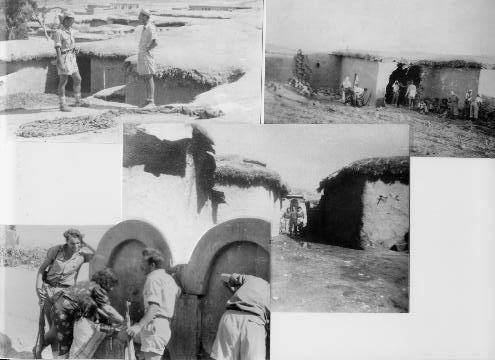
Collage of photos of Huj from Palmach archive. 1948

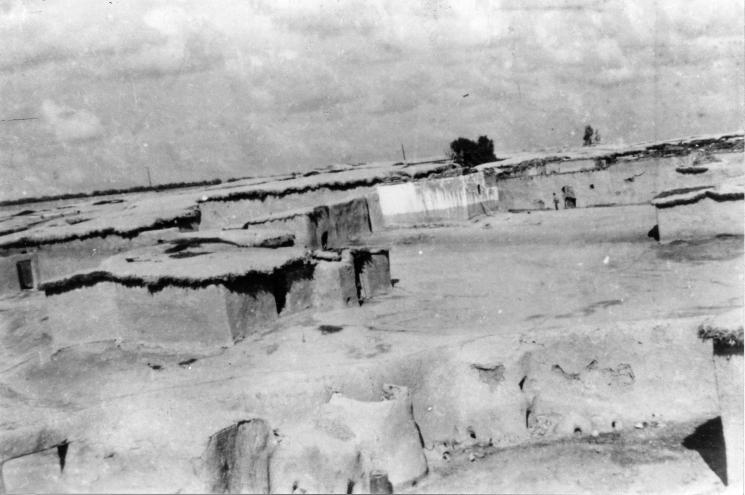
Huj, 1948. Photo from Palmach archive. See figure for scale.

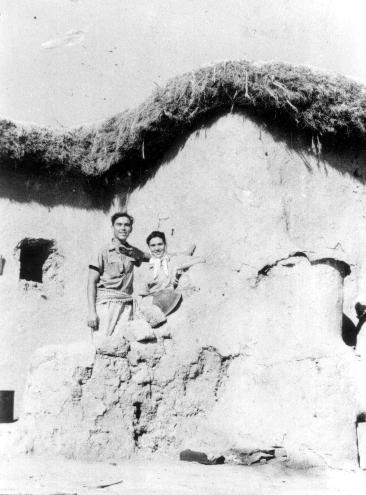
Huj after the conquest. 1948

=== 1948 war and aftermath ===
As the Egyptian army advanced from the south a decision was taken towards the end of May 1948 by the Negev Brigade to expel the villagers of Huj from their lands, and on 31 May, their houses were blown up, their assets looted, and they were driven off to the Gaza Strip. The heads of three kibbutzim, respectively Farda, Gavri and Frisch from Dorot, Nir-Am and Ruhama, later, on August 4, wrote a letter of complaint to Ben-Gurion over the treatment that had been meted out to the local Palestinians. While personally he did not intervene and did not condemn what had happened, he expressed a hope that the IDF might listen to their complaint:

"I hope that the HQ will pay attention to what you say, and will avoid such unjust and unjustified actions in the future, and will set right these things in so far as possible with respect to the past."

In September 1948 former villagers of Huj, noting that the area around Huj was quiet, appealed to Israel to allow them back. Members of the Ministry of Minority Affairs Bechor-Shalom Sheetrit and Yaakov Shimoni wrote that the inhabitants deserved special treatment as they had been "loyal", and had not fled but were expelled. However, the Israeli defence authorities decided not to allow the villagers back.

Havat Shikmim ("Sycamore Ranch") was built on Huj lands and was later purchased by Ariel Sharon in 1972. According to Izzeldin Abuelaish the mosque of Huj has been serving as the pen for Sharon's Arabian thoroughbred horses.

In 1992, the village site was described: "Only one dilapidated building remains, a concrete structure with rectangular doors and windows and a flat roof. Its former function is not clear; it now serves as a farm storehouse. One can also identify the remnants of a watering trough. Sycamore trees and cactuses grow on the eastern and western edges of the site. An Israeli sheep farm has also been established on the site."

In 1998, refugees from Huj in Gaza numbered an estimated 5,770 people.

== See also ==
- Depopulated Palestinian locations in Israel

== Bibliography ==
- Barron, J.B., ed. (1923). Palestine: Report and General Abstracts of the Census of 1922. Government of Palestine.
- Conder, C.R.; Kitchener, H.H. (1883). The Survey of Western Palestine: Memoirs of the Topography, Orography, Hydrography, and Archaeology. Vol. 3. London: Committee of the Palestine Exploration Fund.
- Department of Statistics (1945). Village Statistics, April, 1945. Government of Palestine.
- Guérin, V. (1869). Description Géographique Historique et Archéologique de la Palestine (in French). Vol. 1: Judee, pt. 2. Paris: L'Imprimerie Nationale.
- Hadawi, S. (1970). Village Statistics of 1945: A Classification of Land and Area ownership in Palestine. Palestine Liberation Organization Research Center.
- Hartmann, M. (1883). "Die Ortschaftenliste des Liwa Jerusalem in dem türkischen Staatskalender für Syrien auf das Jahr 1288 der Flucht (1871)". Zeitschrift des Deutschen Palästina-Vereins. 6: 102–149.
- Khalidi, W. (1992). All That Remains: The Palestinian Villages Occupied and Depopulated by Israel in 1948. Washington D.C.: Institute for Palestine Studies. ISBN 0-88728-224-5.
- Mills, E., ed. (1932). Census of Palestine 1931. Population of Villages, Towns and Administrative Areas. Jerusalem: Government of Palestine.
- Morris, B. (2004). The Birth of the Palestinian Refugee Problem Revisited. Cambridge University Press. ISBN 978-0-521-00967-6.
- Oron, Maya (2017-12-03). "Horbat Hoga" (129). Hadashot Arkheologiyot – Excavations and Surveys in Israel.
- Palmer, E.H. (1881). The Survey of Western Palestine: Arabic and English Name Lists Collected During the Survey by Lieutenants Conder and Kitchener, R. E. Transliterated and Explained by E.H. Palmer. Committee of the Palestine Exploration Fund.
- Robinson, E.; Smith, E. (1841). Biblical Researches in Palestine, Mount Sinai and Arabia Petraea: A Journal of Travels in the year 1838. Vol. 2. Boston: Crocker & Brewster.
- Robinson, E.; Smith, E. (1841). Biblical Researches in Palestine, Mount Sinai and Arabia Petraea: A Journal of Travels in the year 1838. Vol. 3. Boston: Crocker & Brewster.
- Socin, A. (1879). "Alphabetisches Verzeichniss von Ortschaften des Paschalik Jerusalem". Zeitschrift des Deutschen Palästina-Vereins. 2: 135–163.
