= Nureddin Pasha =

Ottoman/Turkish general (1873–1932)

Nureddin İbrahim Konyar
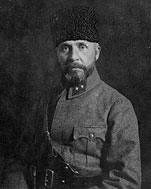
- Born: 1873; Bursa, Ottoman Empire
- Died: 18 February 1932 (aged 58–59); Kadıköy, Istanbul, Turkey
- Burial place: Beylerbeyi Küplüce Mezarlığı
- Military career
- Allegiance: Ottoman Empire; Turkey
- Branch: Ottoman Army; Turkish Land Forces
- Service years: Ottoman Empire: 1893–1919; Turkey: July 1920 – January 1925
- Rank: Lieutenant general
- Nickname: Sakallı Nureddin ('Bearded Nureddin')
- Commands: 4th Division, Iraq Area Command (Governor of Basra, Baghdad), 9th Corps, Muğla and Antalya Area Command, 21st Corps, 17th Corps, 25th Corps, Aidin Area Command (Governor of Aidin Vilayet), Central Army, 1st Army
- Conflicts: Greco-Turkish War; Italo-Turkish War; Balkan Wars; World War I; Turkish War of Independence
- Other work: Member of the GNAT (Bursa)

Signature
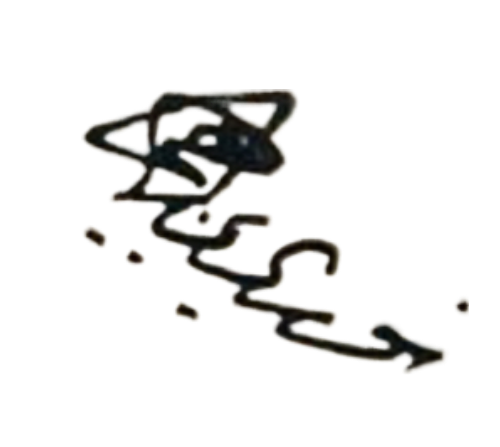

Nureddin Ibrahim Pasha (Turkish: Nurettin Paşa, Nureddin İbrahim Paşa; 1873 – 18 February 1932), known as Nureddin İbrahim Konyar from 1934, was a Turkish military officer who served in the Ottoman Army during World War I and in the Turkish Army during the Western Front of the Turkish War of Independence. He was called Bearded Nureddin (Turkish: Sakallı Nurettin) because being the only high-ranking Turkish officer during the Turkish War of Independence sporting a beard. He is known as one of the most important commanders of the war. He ordered several murders and massacres.

== Ottoman era ==
He was born in 1873 in Bursa of Turkish descent. His father, Field Marshal (Müşir) İbrahim Pasha was a high-ranking officer in the Ottoman Army. He entered the Ottoman Military Academy (Mekteb-i Füsûn-u Harbiyye-i Şâhâne), in Pangaltı, in 1890. He completed the Military Academy as the 31st of the class in 1893 and joined the Ottoman military as an infantry second lieutenant (Mülâzım-ı Sani). Nureddin Pasha was one of the few to reach high rank without having attended a staff college. He knew Arabic, French, German, and Russian.

He served in the 40th Infantry Battalion of the Fifth Army between March and April 1893. He served in the headquarters of the Hassa Ordusu (First Army) between April 1893 and October 1898. On 31 January 1895, he was promoted to the rank of first lieutenant (Mülâzım-ı Evvel) and, on 22 July 1895, to that of captain (Yüzbaşı).

He took part in the Greco-Turkish War of 1897 as the aide-de-camp of the commander-in-chief Edhem Pasha. After going back to Constantinople, he was assigned to the 1st department (chief of operations) of the headquarters of the First Army. In October 1898, he was appointed to the aide-de-camp of Sultan Abdul Hamid II. In 1901, he was promoted to the rank of major (Binbaşı). He was appointed Staff Group of the Command of Bulgarian Border between 1901 and 1902. Nureddin Bey fought guerrillas in Macedonia between 1902 and 1903.

In December 1907, he was assigned to the prestigious Third Army headquarters in Salonika. He was promoted to the rank of lieutenant colonel (Kaymakam) in 1907 and Colonel (Miralay) in 1908. Before the Young Turk Revolution of 1908, when Müşir İbrahim Pasha attempted to establish discipline in the army, Major Djemal Bey and other members of the Committee of Union and Progress approached his son Nureddin Bey, with warning to the Müşir İbrahim Pasha to keep off their patch. Nureddin Bey joined the Committee of Union and Progress (membership number was 6436). On 19 August 1909, he was demoted to major, because of the Law for the Purge of Military Ranks (Tasfiye-i Rüteb-i Askeriye Kanunu) and sent to reserve under the First Army. In September 1909, he was appointed to the Governor of Küçükçekmece. In April 1910, he was appointed to the vice commander of the 77th Infantry Regiment by 1910 and after became the commander of the 1st Battalion of the 83rd Infantry Regiment.

In February 1911, Nureddin Bey served on the XIV Corps staff fighting insurgents in Yemen and promoted to the rank of lieutenant colonel. In November he became reserve under the XIV Corps. By 1913 he returned from Yemen to command the 9th Infantry Regiment in the last stage of Balkan War. In 1913 he served with the model force (numune kıtası) formed in conjunction with Liman von Sanders's German Military Mission (German: Deutsche Militärmissionen im Osmanischen Reich, Turkish: Alman Hey'et-i Askeriyye-i Islâhiyyesi).

=== World War ===
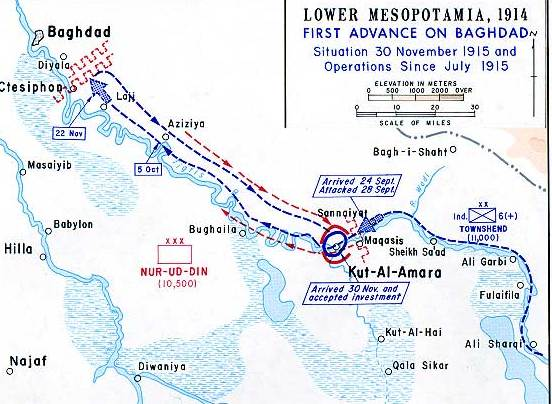
Major General Townshend's retreat and Colonel Nureddin Bey's pursuit/encirclement operations

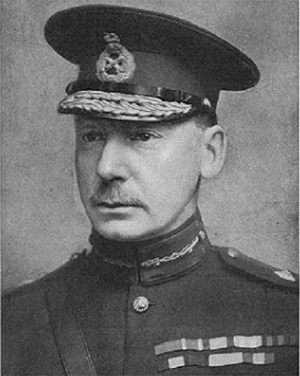
Major General Townshend

By April 1914 he assumed command of the 4th Division (Dördüncü Fırka). The commander of the Iraq Area Command Süleyman Askerî Bey committed suicide on 14 April 1915 and Nureddin Bey was assigned to the Iraq Area Command on 20 April. He arrived in June to take command of the battered army in Iraq and he was appointed the Governor of Basra Province and Baghdad Province at the same time.

In November 1915, Nureddin Bey stopped Major General Charles Vere Ferrers Townshend's 6th Poona Infantry Division of British Indian Army at the Battle of Ctesiphon, and then pursued his retreating opponents to the town of Kut. Several attacks failed to take the town, and he settled down to a siege which ended in a British surrender. German Generalfeldmarschall Colmar von der Goltz arrived at Baghdad on 21 December 1915, changed the name of the Command as the Iraq Army (Irak Ordusu), inspected his positions and later left to start an invasion of Persia. On 20 January 1916, Enver Pasha, Ottoman Minister of War, replaced Nureddin Bey with Colonel Halil Bey and Nureddin Bey was appointed to the commander of the IX Corps and the provisional commander of the Third Army.

In October 1916, he was appointed to the commander of the Muğla and Antalya Area Command (Muğla ve Antalya Havalisi Komutanlığı) and ordered to establish the XXI Corps (he became the commander of this corps) based in Aidin and became the Deputy Governor of Aidin Vilayet on 25 October 1918. He was promoted to the rank of Mirliva in 1918.

=== After the armistice ===
After the Armistice of Mudros, in November 1918, he was appointed to the commander of the XVII Corps based in İzmir and the Governor of Aidin Vilayet at the same time. On 30 December 1918 he was appointed to the commander of the XXV Corps based in Constantinople. On 2 February 1919, because of the breaking out of the rebellion in Urla, he was reassigned to the Governor of Aidin Vilayet and Aidin Area Command (Aydın Bölge Komutanığı).

Nureddin Pasha established a consultation committee consisting of delegates of parties, societies and merchant clubs in Smyrna (Izmir), and supported activities of the Society for the Defence of Ottoman Rights in Izmir (İzmir Müdafaa-i Hukuk-ı Osmaniye Cemiyeti). However, activities of the society slowed down with Nurettin Pasha's departure from İzmir. In order to weaken Turkish defense against Greek landing at İzmir, The Allied Powers, especially the British Prime Minister David Lloyd George, wanted to remove Nurettin Pasha from İzmir. Before the Occupation of İzmir, nationalist general Nureddin Pasha was recalled the Governor, who had fallen foul of Chrysostomos of Smyrna. Kurd Ahmet Izzet Pasha was appointed as the new governor on 11 March, and retired general Ali Nadir Pasha was appointed as the new military commander on 22 March.

== War of Independence ==
In June 1920, he passed through Anatolia to participate in the national liberation movement and he was appointed to the commander of the Central Army (Merkez Ordusu) based in Amasya of some 10,000 men on 9 December 1920. Due to his appointment as the military general governor of the Pontus, the position of the Pontic Greeks took a turn for the worse. He expelled American missionaries and put some local Christians on trial for treason.

=== Koçgiri Rebellion ===
Against Koçgiri rebels, Nureddin Pasha led a force of some 3,000 cavalrymen and irregulars including the 47th Giresun Volunteer Regiment led by Topal Osman. The rebels were crushed by 17 June 1921.

According to some sources, Nurettin Pasha said: (other sources attribute this to Topal Osman):

In homeland (Turkey), we cleaned up people who say "zo" (Armenians), I'm going to clean up people who say "lo" (Kurds) by their roots.

— Turkish original, Türkiye'de (Memlekette) Zo (Ermeniler) diyenleri temizledik, Lo (Kürtler) diyenlerin köklerini de ben temizleyeceğim.

The severity of the repression led to angry debates in the Grand National Assembly. The assembly decided to send Nureddin Pasha to a commission of enquiry and to put him on trial. Nureddin Pasha was relieved on 3 November 1921 and recalled to Ankara. But Mustafa Kemal prevented a trial and Nureddin Pasha was soon rehabilitated and became the commander of the First Army in 1922.

=== Pontic Greek Expulsion and Massacre ===
On 9 June 1921, the Greek destroyers Panthir and battleship Kilkis bombed İnebolu. Nureddin Pasha advised the general staff of the Ankara government that in view of the danger of a Greek landing in Samsun, all male Greeks aged between 16 and 50 years should be deported to Amasya, Tokat and Karahisar-ı Şarkî (present day: Şebinkarahisar) by the order numbered 2082 and dated 12 January 1921. The Ankara government accepted it on 16 June. And the Central Army deported nearly 21,000 persons and the Samsun Independent Tribunal passed 485 death sentences. The massacres committed from the Central Army were so brutal, than even MPs of the GNAT demanded Nureddin's execution. Eventually, the National Assembly relieved him of command and prosecuted him, but Mustafa Kemal revoked the procedure. After the Greek armoured cruiser Georgios Averof bombed Samsun on 7 June 1922, Greeks in the areas of western and southern Anatolia under Turkish nationalist control were deported by order of the Ankara government.

=== Great Offensive ===
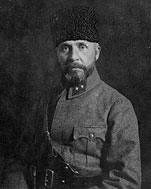
Lieutenant general "Sakallı" Nureddin Pasha

After the commander of the First Army Ali İhsan (Sâbis) was dismissed and sent to the Konya Court Martial, the command of the First Army was offered to Ali Fuat (Cebesoy), and then Refet (Bele). But neither man wanted to serve under İsmet (İnönü). On 29 June 1922, Nureddin Pasha was appointed to the commander of the First Army replacing Ali İhsan and on 31 August, he was promoted to the rank of Ferik.

=== Murder of Archbishop Chrysostomos and Great Fire of Smyrna ===
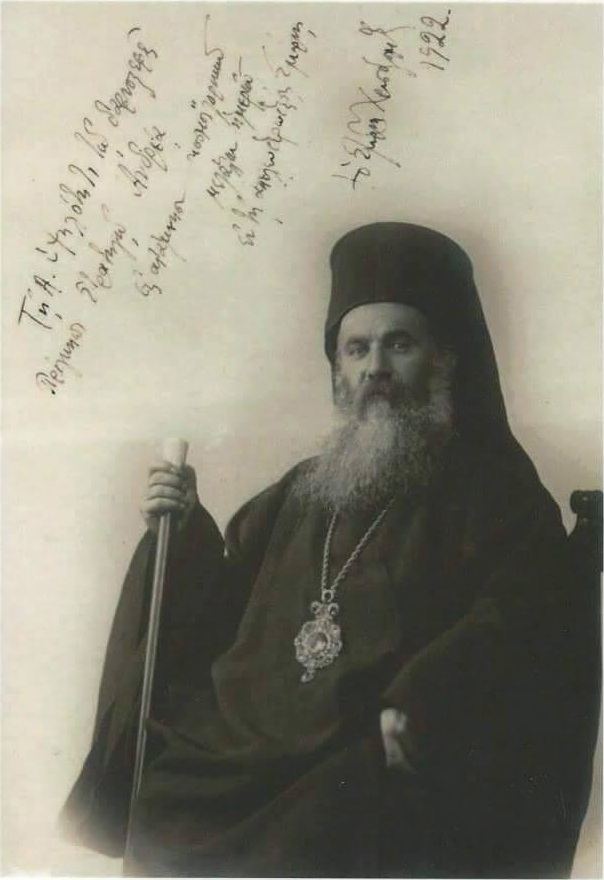
Chrysostomos of Smyrna

He was to re-enter into İzmir at the head of the First Army on 9 September 1922. According to Ütkan Kocatürk, he was assigned the Military Governor (Askerî Vali) of İzmir, but according to other sources, the Commander of the I Corps Mirliva İzzettin Pasha (Çalışlar) was appointed the Military Governor and Abdülhalik Bey (Renda) was appointed the Civil Governor of İzmir. Nureddin Pasha summoned the Greek archbishop Chrysostomos of Smyrna and accused him of treason. Nureddin Pasha pushed him out of the residence and invited a mob of Turks to deal with him. He was killed in a lynching.

Falih Rıfkı (Atay), the Turkish nationalist journalist who had come from Constantinople to İzmir to interview Mustafa Kemal, noted in his diary about the Great Fire of Smyrna that began on 13 September 1922 as follows:

Why were we burning down İzmir? Were we afraid that if waterfront konaks, hotels and taverns stayed in place, we would never be able to get rid of the minorities? When the Armenians were being deported in the First World War, we had burned down all the habitable districts and neighbourhoods in Anatolian towns and cities with this very same fear. This does not solely derive from an urge for destruction. There is also some feeling of inferiority in it. It was as if anywhere that resembled Europe was destined to remain Christian and foreign and to be denied to us. If there were another war and we were defeated, would it be sufficient guarantee of preserving the Turkishness of the city if we had left Izmir as a devastated expanse of vacant lots? Were it not for Nureddin Pasha, whom I know to be a dyed-in-the-wool fanatic and a rabble-rouser, I do not think this tragedy would have gone to the bitter end. He has doubtless been gaining added strength from the unforgiving vengeful feelings of the soldiers and officers who have seen the debris and the weeping and agonized population of the Turkish towns which the Greeks have burned to ashes all the way from Afyon.

After the Armistice of Mudanya, his army was relocated in İzmit by the order numbered 42 and dated 11 October 1922.

=== Murder of Ali Kemal Bey ===
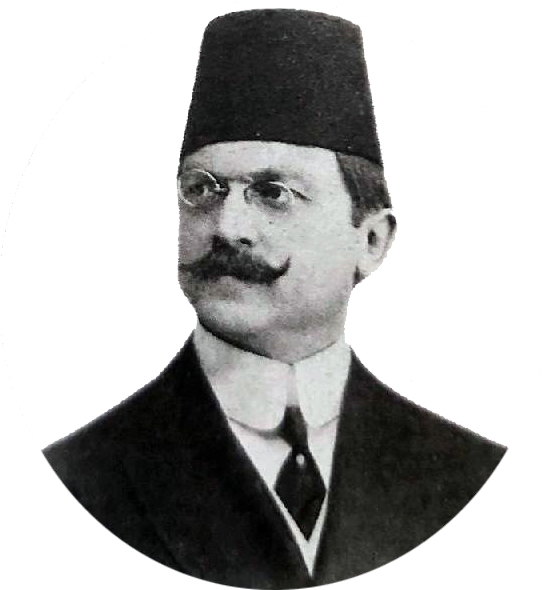
Ali Kemal Bey

During his time as a commander in İzmit, Nureddin Pasha arranged the kidnapping of former Minister of Interior Ali Kemal Bey. According to retired Staff Colonel Rahmi Apak (1887–1963) Ali Kemal was seized on 4 November 1922 by two police commissars named Mazlûm and Cem, whom historian Cemal Kutay (1909–2006) identified by agents of the secret organization M. M. (ﻡﻡ, Mim Mim, abbreviation of Müsellâh Müdâfaa-i Milliye means Armed National Defence) while at a barber's shop in / in front of the Tokatlıyan Hotel and taken out of the British zone to Kumkapı. At night Ali Kemal was put on and brought to İzmit. Staff Captain Rahmi (Apak) ordered a reserve officer Necip Ali (Küçüka) (1892–1941), who was the intern prosecutor, to examine Ali Kemal Bey. After that Ali Kemal Bey was called by Nureddin Pasha. Nureddin Pasha told Ali Kemal to transfer to the military court and Ali Kemal Bey replied that I'm ready to go to court. But Nureddin Pasha ordered Rahmi:

Now gather a few hundred people in front of the large gate. Let them kill Ali Kemal, let them lynch him, when he is exiting through the gate.

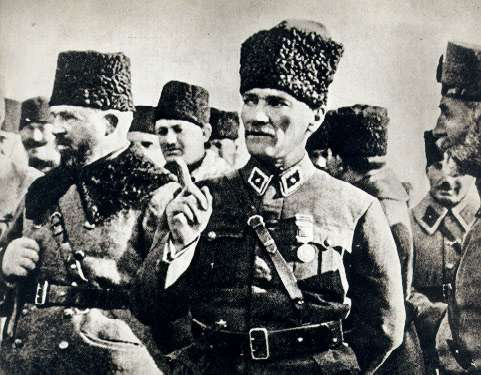
Nureddin Pasha and Gazi Mustafa Kemal Pasha in Gebze (17 January 1923)

Rahmi hesitated to execute this order and sent Captain "Kel" Sait to Nureddin Pasha. Rahmi said to Necip Ali: Go ahead Necip Ali Bey, take Ali Kemal Beyefendi to the military court. Necip Ali and Ali Kemal exited through the gate and were attacked by a mob. Necip Ali, who was uninformed about operation, was also attacked and came back to Rahmi's room to complaint about their situations. Ali Kemal Bey was beaten and stoned, got knifed in his back and laid down to the ground. Mob stripped and took his new suits. They robbed the ring on his finger, gold watch, whatever he has in his pockets. Then they bound him with rope at his ankles and dragged downhill him wearing only underpants and shirts.

Nureddin Pasha made a scaffold on the small tunnel, where the railway passes, next to the station and hanged the dead body of Ali Kemal Bey to show İsmet Pasha who travelled through the town by train a few days later on his way to the Conference of Lausanne.

=== Perfidy in the occupation of Constantinople ===
Nureddin Pasha sent civil servants to buy 3,000 used civilian suits. He ordered soldiers and officers of infantry battalions and made them pass the British line with those suits at night company by company. First party of them was placed in a boots factory in Beykoz. Two more battalion were sent to pass the Bosphorus and dispatched to houses, mosques and madrasas around Rumeli Hisarı. After the both sides of the Bosphorus were held by a regiment, they surrounded the British garrisons in Haydarpaşa and Kadıköy. Nureddin Pasha appointed Cavalry Lieutenant Colonel Nidai Bey as commander of this organization. Important places in Constantinople were occupied by these armed infantries with civilian clothes. This organization named K.T. (ﮒ ﺕ, Kef Te, abbreviation of Geçit Teşkilâtı means "Passage Organization") that was called Köfte (meatball) by Mehmetçiks, was established by the General Staff and administrated by the First Army. K.T. was disbanded on 8 August 1923, after the signing of the Treaty of Lausanne. The Turkish military units belonging to the III Corps (Üçüncü Kolordu) under the command of Mirliva Shukri Naili (Gökberk) and Nureddin Pasha entered Constantinople on 6 October 1923.

== Republican era ==
=== Deputy ===
In June 1923, when the First Army was dissolved, he went on leave without command. Kâzım Karabekir was appointed as the First Army inspector. In March 1924, he was appointed to the member of the Supreme Military Council. In December 1924, a by-election of the Grand National Assembly of Turkey was held in Bursa, Nureddin Pasha stood as an independent and defeated the candidate of the Republican People's Party. He resigned membership after elected as the deputy of Bursa for the Grand National Assembly. However, on 17 January 1925, the status of deputy of Nureddin Pasha was rejected by the Grand National Assembly on the ground of his military register. Nureddin Pasha retired from the army on his own terms. And when the election was held again on 2 February, Nureddin Pasha increased his vote.

=== Hat Law ===
In November 1925, Nureddin Pasha argued that the draft of the Hat Law (Şapka İktisasına Dair Kanun) violated the constitution. But other deputies competed in denouncing him an enemy of the popular will. The Justice Minister Mahmud Esad (Bozkurt) declared The grant of freedom is not to be a toy in the hands of reactionaries...The things for the country's interests can not be contrary to the Constitution, was determined not to be..

=== Nutuk ===
In October 1927, Mustafa Kemal criticized him in his Nutuk speech. According to Mustafa Kemal, in 1923 Nureddin Pasha made Âbit Süreyya to publish a booklet of biography (Tercüme-i hal), in booklet Nureddin Pasha was described as the surrounder of Kut-Al-Amara, the defender of Baghdad, the vanquisher of Yemen, Ctesiphon, Western Anatolia, Afyon Karahisar, Dumlupınar, the conqueror of İzmir.

== Death ==
On 18 February 1932, he died in his house at Kızlarağası Çeşmesi Street (present day: Müverrih Ağa Street) number 23 in Kadıköy Hasanpaşa neighbourhood. He was married to Nazmiye Hanım (surname: Türe, death 1951) and had two daughters, Semiha Hanım (1896–1950) and Memduha Hanım (1904–1970). Semiha Hanım was married to Hüseyin Pasha, Memduha Hanım was married to Major General Eşref Alpdoğan. Some researchers including Uğur Mumcu confused him with the Governor of the Fourth Inspectorate-General Lieutenant General Hüseyin Abdullah Alpdoğan.

After the 12 September coup d'état, to select Atatürk's comrades who would be transfer to the State Cemetery, the Turkish Historical Society identified Nureddin Pasha as one of the Atatürk's closest 50 comrades during the War of Independence and made him honorable member of the Atatürk Research Center. Moreover, Nureddin Pasha was shown not Ferik but Orgeneral (four-star rank) and fourth man after İsmet İnönü and Fevzi Çakmak. And these decisions were accepted by the General Staff. But because of the public reaction to the decision, the General Staff gave up the transfer of the Nureddin Pasha's body to the State Cemetery.

== See also ==
- List of high-ranking commanders of the Turkish War of Independence

== Medals and decorations ==
- Order of Medjidie, 5th class
- Order of Osmanieh, 3rd class
- Order of Medjidie with Sword, 2nd class
- Gold Liakat Medal
- Legion of Honour
- Iron Cross
- Medal of Independence with Red Ribbon & Citation

Military offices
Preceded by Süleyman Askerî Bey	Commander of the Iraq Area Command; Iraq Army; 20 April 1915 – 20 January 1916	Succeeded by Halil (Kut)
Preceded by	Commander of the Central Army; 9 December 1920 – 3 November 1921	Succeeded by
Preceded by Ali İhsan (Sâbis)	Commander of the First Army; 29 July 1922 – 15 August 1923	Succeeded by Kâzım Karabekir
