= Central Army (Turkey) =

- Active: December 9, 1920 – February 8, 1922
- Country: Turkey
- Allegiance: Ankara Government
- Size: around 10,000 (December 1920)
- Part of: Turkish Army
- Garrison/HQ: Amasya
- Nickname(s): Turkish Liberation Army
- Engagements: Turkish War of Independence

Commanders
- Notable commanders: Nureddin Pasha; Kâzım Karabekir

The Central Army (Modern Turkish: Merkez Ordusu) was one of the field armies of the Army of the Grand National Assembly during the Turkish War of Independence. It was raised in December 1920 and inactivated on 28 February 1922.

== History ==
In 1920, groups of Pontic Greeks were attacking Muslim villages and farms along the Turkish Black Sea coast. To counter this, the Central Army was established, under the command of General Nureddin Pasha, in December 1920, with its headquarters located in Amasya. The army initially had a strength of around 10,000 men organized in the following units:

- the 5th Caucasian Division
- the 15th Division
- the 14th Cavalry Division, consisting of:
  - the 27th Cavalry Brigade
  - the 28th Cavalry Brigade
- the 13th Independent Cavalry Brigade
- three company-sized militia units

The 5th Caucasian and 15th Divisions were formerly part of the Ottoman Army's III Corps.

Nureddin was given responsibility for the region from Sinop west to Trabzon along the Black Sea coast, and inland to Çorum, Amasya and Sivas. He was given almost unlimited authority to suppress the uprisings. Already possessing a reputation for harshness, starting in early February 1921 he had his men kill and wound Pontic Greek civilians and burn down their homes. On 12 June, an order was issued to move all Greeks from the coast to the interior, with the Central Army being notified on 16 June. Nureddin also led 3,000 cavalrymen and irregulars to fight the Kurdish Koçgiri rebellion. The rebellion was crushed by 24 April.

In May 1921, all three divisions were transferred to the Western Front Command; in their place, the Central Army received two new divisions, the 10th in Samsun and the 16th in Amasya. As time went on, Nureddin lost more experienced units to the Western Front Command, while receiving new, untested formations in return. Nonetheless, the uprisings were essentially suppressed by the fall of 1921.

Nureddin was relieved of command by the Grand National Assembly on 3 or 8 November of that year and recalled to face a trial for his harsh tactics in putting down the Koçgiri rebellion. He was shielded by Mustafa Kemal Pasha from undergoing a trial. Nureddin's replacement as commander of the Central Army was General Kâzım Karabekir.

The Turkish government inactivated the Central Army on 28 February 1922.

== See also ==
- Republic of Pontus
