= XXI Corps (Ottoman Empire) =

XXI Corps Yirmi Birinci Kolordu
- Active: 1916–
- Country: Ottoman Empire
- Type: Corps

Commanders
- Notable commanders: Miralay Nurettin Bey (October 1916-November 1918)

The XXI Corps of the Ottoman Empire (Turkish: 21 nci Kolordu or Yirmi Birinci Kolordu) was one of the corps of the Ottoman Army. It was formed during World War I.

== World War I ==
=== Order of Battle, August 1917, January 1918, June 1918 ===
In August 1917, January 1918, June 1918, the corps was structured as follows:

- XXI Corps (Gallipoli)
  - 49th Division

=== Order of Battle, September 1918 ===
In September 1918, the corps was structured as follows:

- XXI Corps (Gallipoli)
  - 49th Division

== After Mudros ==
=== Order of Battle, November 1918 ===
In November 1918, the corps was structured as follows:

- XXI Corps (Aydın)
  - 58th Division
