= Genocides in history =

Genocide is the intentional destruction of a people (Note: Defined under the Genocide Convention as "national, ethnical, racial, or religious group.") in whole or in part. The term was coined in 1944 by Raphael Lemkin. It is defined in Article 2 of the Convention on the Prevention and Punishment of the Crime of Genocide (CPPCG) of 1948 as "any of the following acts committed with intent to destroy, in whole or in part, a national, ethnical, racial, or religious group, as such: killing members of the group; causing serious bodily or mental harm to members of the group; deliberately inflicting on the group conditions of life calculated to bring about its physical destruction in whole or in part; imposing measures intended to prevent births within the group; [and] forcibly transferring children of the group to another group."

The preamble to the CPPCG states that "genocide is a crime under international law, contrary to the spirit and aims of the United Nations and condemned by the civilized world", and it also states that "at all periods of history genocide has inflicted great losses on humanity." Genocide is widely considered to be the epitome of human evil, and has been referred to as the "crime of crimes". The Political Instability Task Force estimated that 43 genocides occurred between 1956 and 2016, resulting in 50 million deaths. The UNHCR estimated that a further 50 million had been displaced by such episodes of violence.

== Definitions of genocide ==
The debate continues over what legally constitutes genocide. One definition is any conflict that the International Criminal Court has so designated. Mohammed Hassan Kakar argues that the definition should include political groups or any group so defined by the perpetrator. He prefers the definition from Frank Chalk and Kurt Jonassohn, which defines genocide as "a form of one-sided mass killing in which a state or other authority intends to destroy a group so defined by the perpetrator."

In literature, some scholars have popularly emphasized the role that the Soviet Union played in excluding political groups from the international definition of genocide, which is contained in the Genocide Convention of 1948, and in particular they have written that Joseph Stalin may have feared greater international scrutiny of the political killings that occurred in the country, such as the Great Purge; however, this claim is not supported by evidence. The Soviet view was shared and supported by many diverse countries, and they were also in line with Raphael Lemkin's original conception, (Note: By 1951, Lemkin was saying that the Soviet Union was the only state that could be indicted for genocide; his concept of genocide, as it was outlined in Axis Rule in Occupied Europe, covered Stalinist deportations as genocide by default, and differed from the adopted Genocide Convention in many ways. From a 21st-century perspective, its coverage was very broad, and as a result, it would classify almost any gross human rights violation as a genocide, and many events that were deemed genocidal by Lemkin did not amount to genocide under the convention. As the Cold War began, this change was the result of Lemkin's turn to anti-communism in an attempt to convince the United States to ratify the Genocide Convention.) and it was originally promoted by the World Jewish Congress.

== Historical genocides ==
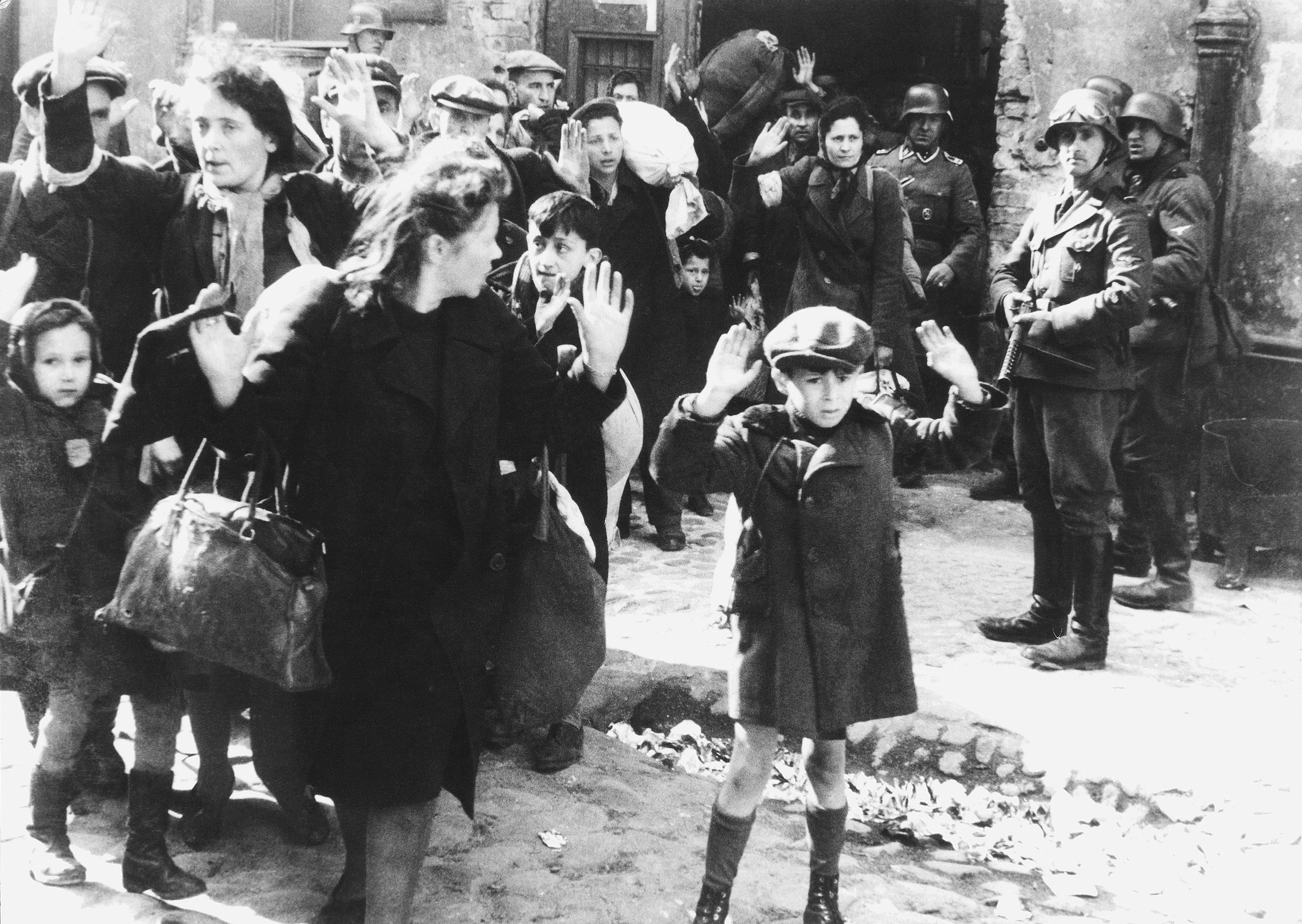
The Holocaust heavily influences the popular understanding of genocide, as mass killing of innocent people based on their ethnic identity.

=== Genocides before World War I ===
Raphael Lemkin applied the concept of genocide to a wide variety of events throughout human history. He and other scholars date the first genocides to prehistoric times. Ancient sources like the Hebrew Bible have been cited by some scholars as acts of genocide although this is criticised by biblical scholars who argue that such a description is anachronistic. Genocide in the ancient world often consisted of the massacre of men and the enslavement or forced assimilation of women and children—often limited to a particular town or city rather than applied to a larger group. Potential medieval examples are found in Europe, even though experts caution against applying a modern term like genocide to such events. Overall, premodern examples that can be considered genocide were relatively uncommon. Beginning in the early modern period, racial ideologies emerged as a more important factor.

According to Frank Chalk, Helen Fein, and Kurt Jonassohn, if a dominant group of people had little in common with a marginalized group of people, it was easy for the dominant group to define the marginalized group as a subhuman group; the marginalized group might be labeled a threat that must be eliminated.

The expansion of various European colonial powers, such as the British and Spanish Empires, and the subsequent establishment of colonies on indigenous territory frequently involved acts of genocidal violence against indigenous groups in the Americas (including Brazil, Paraguay, Canada, and the United States), Australia, Africa, and Asia. According to Lemkin, colonisation was in itself intimately connected with genocide. He saw genocide as a two-phase process: in the first, the indigenous population's way of life was destroyed; and in the second, the newcomers impose their way of life on the indigenous group.

According to David Maybury-Lewis, imperial and colonial forms of genocide are enacted in two main ways, either through the deliberate clearing of territories of their original inhabitants to make them exploitable for purposes of resource extraction or colonial settlements, or through enlisting indigenous peoples as forced laborers in colonialist or imperialist projects of resource extraction. The designation of specific events as genocidal is often controversial.

During the 17th century Beaver Wars, the Iroquois destroyed several large tribal confederacies—including the Mohicans, Huron, Neutral, Erie, Susquehannock, and northern Algonquins—with extreme brutality. The exterminatory nature of the mode of warfare practised by the Iroquois caused some historians to label these events as acts of genocide.

=== Genocides from World War I through World War II ===
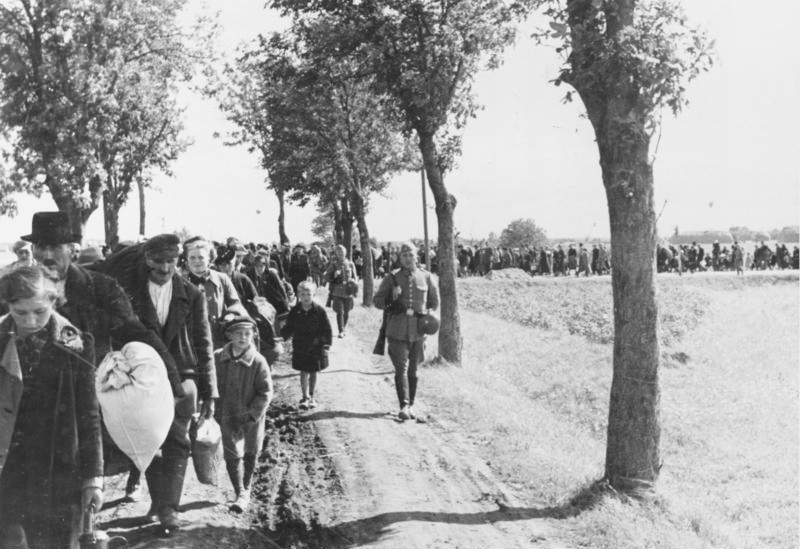
Expulsion of Poles by Nazi Germany. The Generalplan Ost envisaged the deportation, extermination, Germanisation, and enslavement of all or most Poles, Czechs, Ukrainians, Belarusians and Russians.

In 1915, one year after the outbreak of World War I, the concept of crimes against humanity was introduced into international relations for the first time, when the Allies of World War I sent a letter to the government of the Ottoman Empire, a member of the Central Powers, to protest against the late Ottoman genocides that were taking place within the empire, among them, the Armenian genocide, the Assyrian genocide, the Greek genocide, and the Great Famine of Mount Lebanon. The Holocaust, the Nazi genocide of six million European Jews from 1941 to 1945 during the Second World War, is the most studied genocide, and it is also a prototype of genocide; one of the most controversial questions among comparative scholars is the question of the Holocaust's uniqueness, which led to the Historikerstreit in West Germany during the 1980s, and whether there exist historical parallels, which critics believe trivializes it. It is considered to be the "worst case" paradigm of genocide.

Action of Imperial Japan in the 1930s and '40s have been described as genocide; see Japanese war crimes for more detailed information.

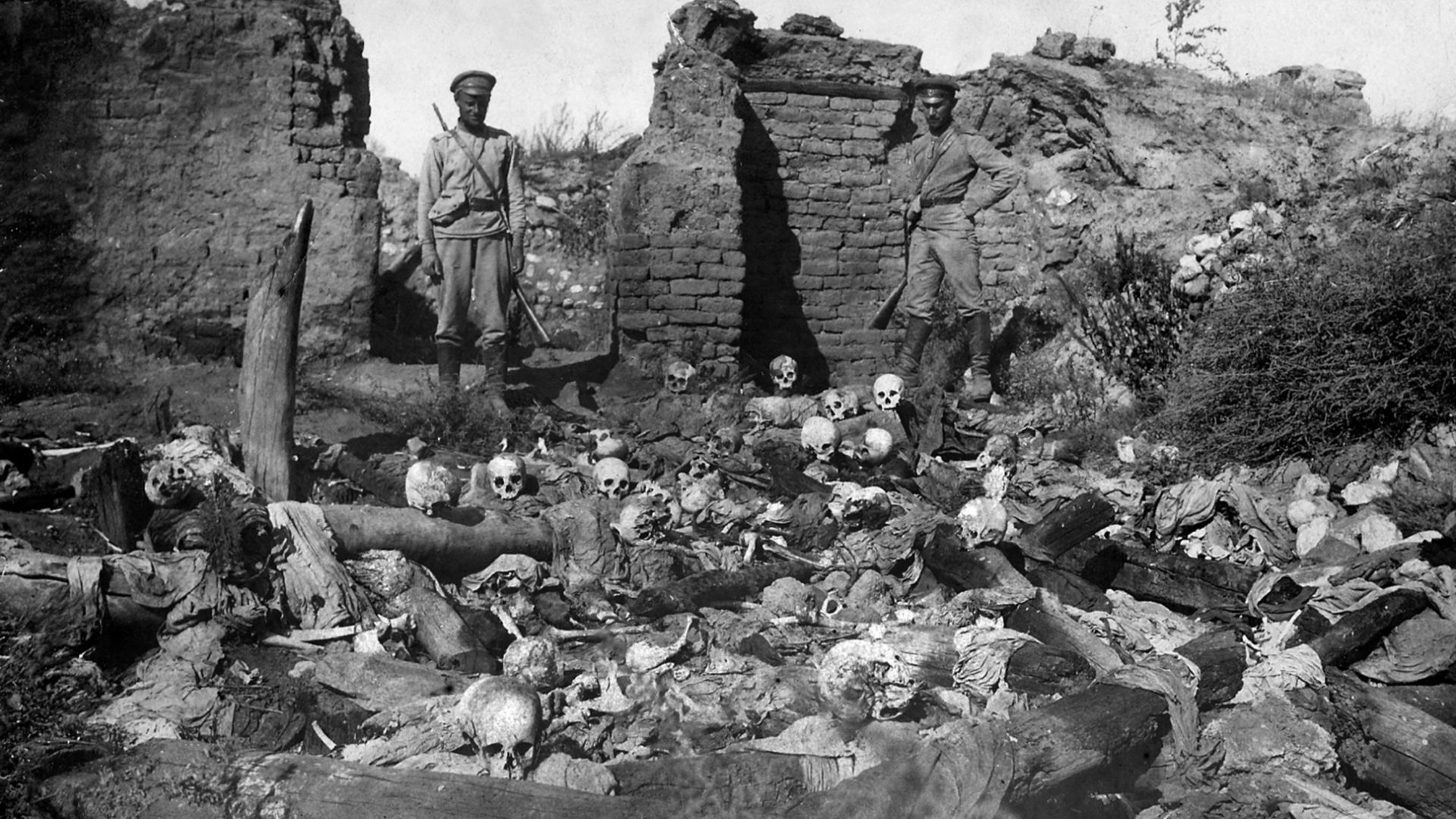
Russian soldiers pictured in the former Armenian village of Sheykhalan near Mush, 1915

Genocide studies started as a side academic field of Holocaust studies, whose researchers associated genocide with the Holocaust and believed that Lemkin's definition of genocide was too broad. In 1985, the United Nations' (UN) Whitaker Report cited the massacre of 100,000 to 250,000 Jews in more than 2,000 pogroms which occurred as part of the White Terror during the Russian Civil War as an act of genocide; it also suggested that consideration should be given to ecocide, ethnocide, and cultural genocide.

=== Genocides from 1946 through 1999 ===
The Genocide Convention was adopted by the UN General Assembly on 9 December 1948 and came into effect on 12 January 1951. After the necessary 20 countries became parties to the convention, it came into force as international law on 12 January 1951; however, only two of the five permanent members of the UN Security Council were parties to the treaty, which caused the Convention to languish for over four decades. During the Cold War era, mass atrocities were committed by communist regimes, as well as by anti-communist/capitalist regimes, among them the Indonesian mass killings of 1965–66, the 1971 Bangladesh genocide, the Cambodian genocide, the Guatemalan genocide and the East Timor genocide. International courts have found a small number of events as constituting genocide, such as the Rwandan genocide and the Srebrenica genocide. The Rwandan genocide also gave an extra impetus to genocide studies in the 1990s.

=== Genocides after 2000 ===
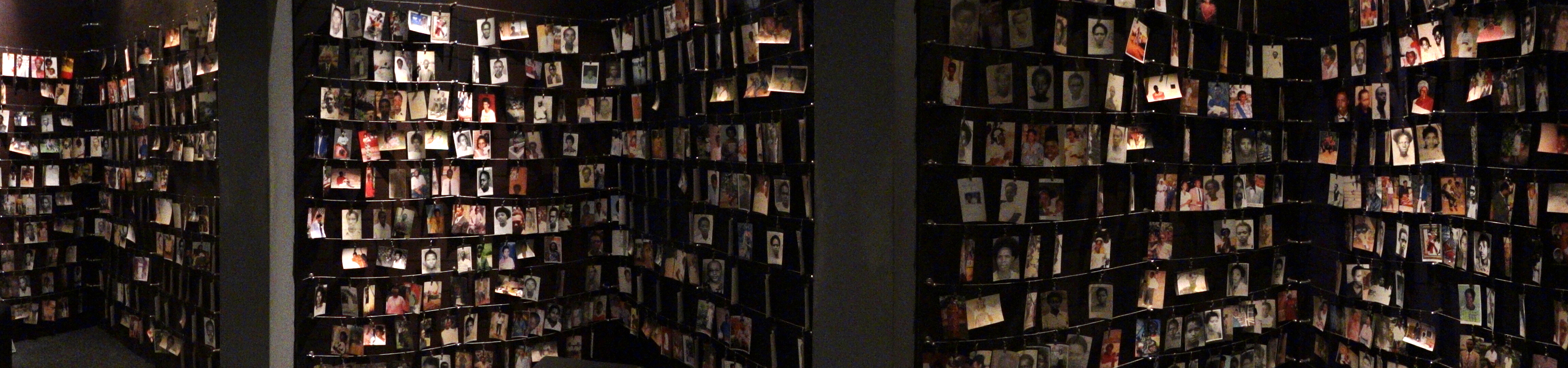
Photographs of victims of the Rwandan genocide at the Kigali Genocide Memorial in Rwanda

In 2021, David Alton, Helen Clark, and Michael Lapsley wrote that the reasons for the Rwandan genocide and the reasons for the atrocities which were committed during the Yugoslav Wars have been analyzed in-depth, and they also wrote that genocide prevention has been extensively discussed in the 21st century.

A group of 34 non-governmental organizations and 31 individuals, calling themselves African Citizens, referred to the Rwanda: The Preventable Genocide report prepared by a panel headed by former Botswana president Quett Masire for the Organisation of African Unity, which later became the African Union. African Citizens highlighted the sentences, commenting: "Indisputably, the most important truth that emerges from our investigation is that the Rwandan genocide could have been prevented by those in the international community who had the position and means to do so. ... The world failed Rwanda. ... [The United Nations] simply did not care enough about Rwanda to intervene appropriately." Chidi Odinkalu, former head of the National Human Rights Commission of Nigeria, was among those involved with African Citizens.

On 20 November 2021, Genocide Watch predicted genocide in Ethiopia, in the context of the war in Tigray and also the violence across the Oromia, and the Benishangul-Gumuz (Metekel) regions that worsened since 2018. On 21 November, Odinkalu called for genocide prevention, stating: "We need to focus on an urgent programme of Genocide Prevention advocacy on Ethiopia NOW. It may be too late in 2 weeks, guys." On 26 November, African Citizens and Alton, Clark, and Lapsley also called for the predicted genocide to be prevented.

The Rohingya genocide is an ongoing genocide of the Muslim Rohingya people consisting of arson, rape, ethnic cleansing, and infanticide by the Burmese military. The genocide has so far consisted of two phases so: the first was a military crackdown that occurred from October 2016 to January 2017, and the second has been occurring since August 2017.

The Chinese government has engaged in a series of human rights abuses against Uyghurs and other ethnic and religious minorities in Xinjiang. Legislatures in several countries, including Canada, the United Kingdom, and France, have passed non-binding motions describing China's actions as genocide. The United States officially denounced China's treatment of Uyghurs as a genocide.

On 16 September 2025, a United Nations commission found that Israel is committing genocide in the Gaza strip.

== International prosecution ==
=== Ad hoc tribunals ===
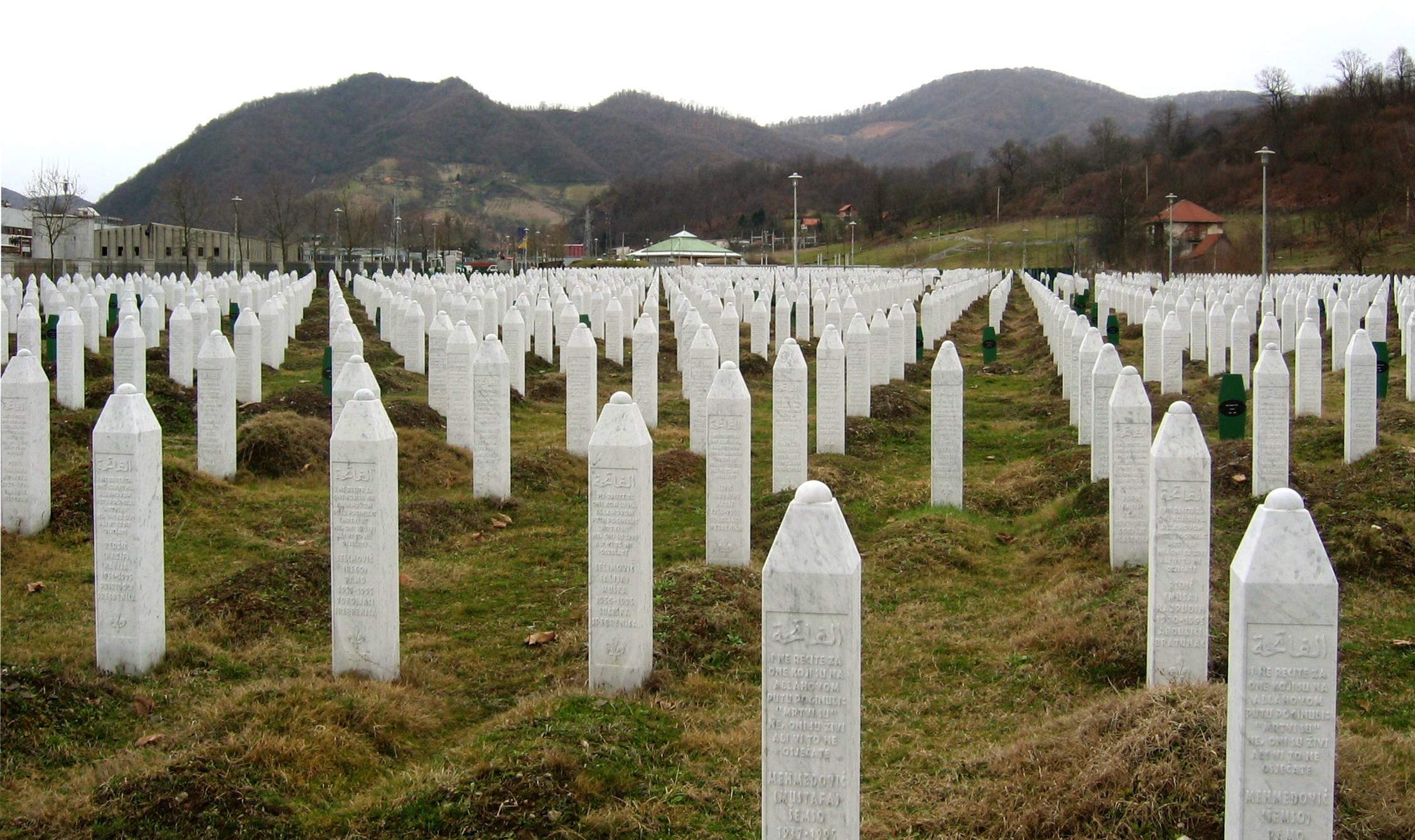
Gravestones at the Potočari genocide memorial near Srebrenica

In 1951, only two of the five permanent members of the UN Security Council (UNSC) were parties to the convention, namely France and the Republic of China. The treaty was ratified by the Soviet Union in 1954, the United Kingdom in 1970, the People's Republic of China in 1983 (having replaced the Taiwan-based Republic of China on the UNSC in 1971), and the United States in 1988. In the 1990s, the international law on the crime of genocide began to be enforced.

==== Bosnia and Herzegovina ====
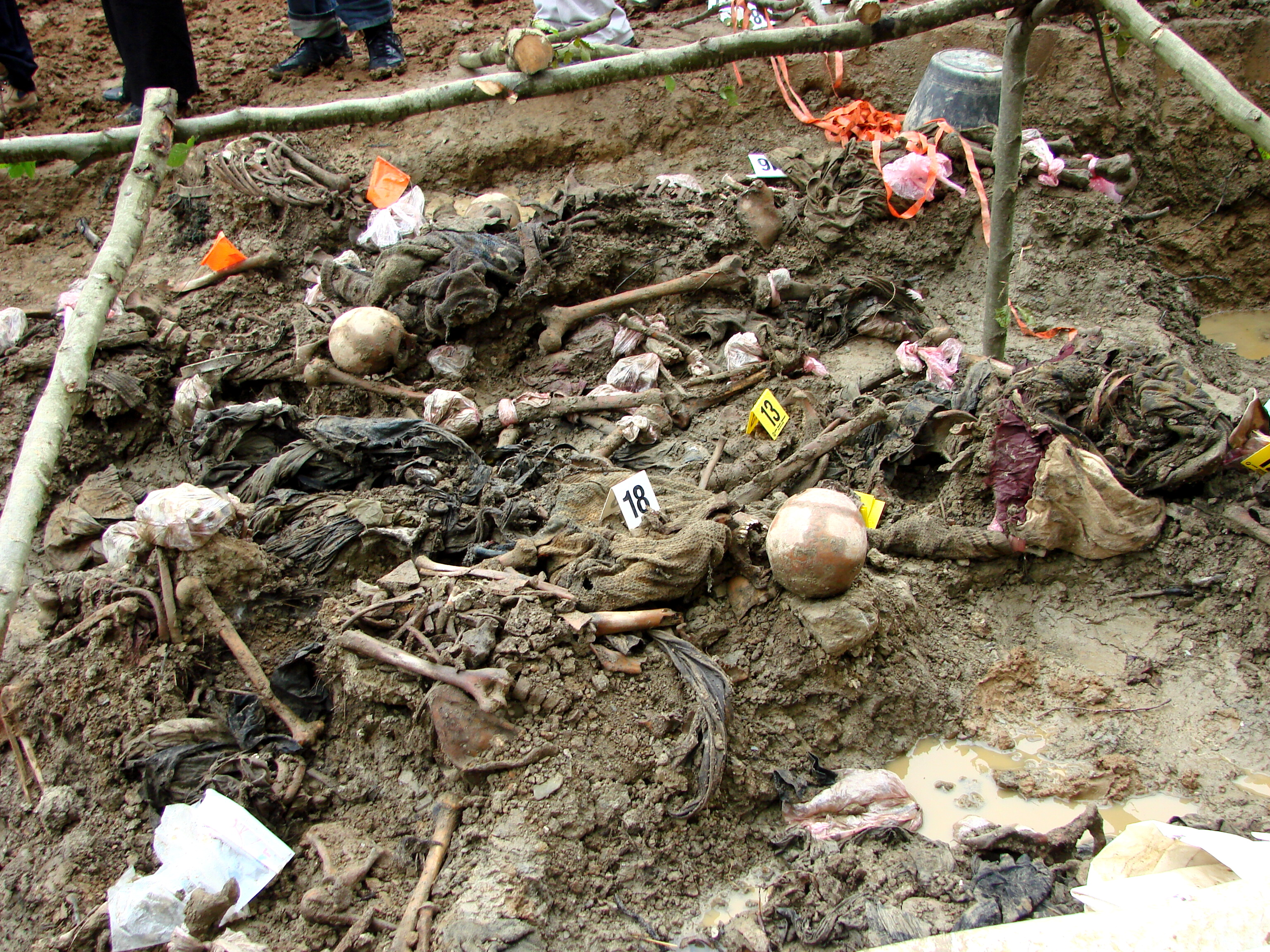
Exhumed mass grave of Srebrenica massacre victims in 2007

In July 1995, Serbian forces killed more than 8,000 Bosniaks (Bosnian Muslims), mainly men and boys, both in and around the town of Srebrenica during the Bosnian War. The killing was perpetrated by units of the Army of Republika Srpska which were under the command of General Ratko Mladić. The Secretary-General of the United Nations described the mass murder as the worst crime on European soil since the Second World War. A paramilitary unit from Serbia known as the Scorpions, officially a part of the Serbian Interior Ministry until 1991, participated in the massacre, along with several hundred Russian and Greek volunteers.

In 2001, the International Criminal Tribunal for the Former Yugoslavia delivered its first conviction for the crime of genocide, against General Krstić for his role in the 1995 Srebrenica massacre (on appeal he was found not guilty of genocide but was instead found guilty of aiding and abetting genocide).

In February 2007, the International Court of Justice returned a judgment in the Bosnian Genocide Case. It upheld the findings of the International Criminal Tribunal for the Former Yugoslavia that genocide had been committed in and around Srebrenica but did not find that genocide had been committed on the wider territory of Bosnia and Herzegovina during the war. The court also ruled that Serbia was not responsible for the genocide nor was it responsible for "aiding and abetting it", although it ruled that Serbia could have done more to prevent the genocide and that Serbia failed to punish the perpetrators. Before this ruling, the term Bosnian Genocide had been used by some academics and human rights officials.

In 2010, Vujadin Popović, Lieutenant Colonel and the Chief of Security of the Drina Corps of the Bosnian Serb Army, and Ljubiša Beara, Colonel and Chief of Security of the same army, were convicted of genocide, extermination, murder and persecution by the International Criminal Tribunal for the Former Yugoslavia for their role in the Srebrenica massacre and were each sentenced to life in prison. In 2016 and 2017, Radovan Karadžić and Ratko Mladić were sentenced for genocide.

German courts handed down convictions for genocide during the Bosnian War. Novislav Djajic was indicted for his participation in the genocide, but the Higher Regional Court failed to find that there was sufficient certainty for a criminal conviction for genocide. Nevertheless, Djajic was found guilty of 14 counts of murder and one count of attempted murder. At Djajic's appeal on 23 May 1997, the Bavarian Appeals Chamber found that acts of genocide were committed in June 1992, confined within the administrative district of Foca. The Higher Regional Court (Oberlandesgericht) of Düsseldorf, in September 1997, handed down a genocide conviction against Nikola Jorgic, a Bosnian Serb from the Doboj region who was the leader of a paramilitary group located in the Doboj region. He was sentenced to four terms of life imprisonment for his involvement in genocidal actions that took place in regions of Bosnia and Herzegovina, other than Srebrenica. On 29 November 1999, the Higher Regional Court (Oberlandesgericht) of Düsseldorf "condemned Maksim Sokolovic to 9 years in prison for aiding and abetting the crime of genocide and for grave breaches of the Geneva Conventions."

==== Rwanda ====
The International Criminal Tribunal for Rwanda (ICTR) is a court under the auspices of the United Nations for the prosecution of offences committed during the Rwandan genocide during April and May 1994, commencing on 6 April. The ICTR was created on 8 November 1994 by the UN Security Council to resolve claims in Rwanda, or by Rwandan citizens in nearby states, between 1 January and 31 December 1994. For approximately 100 days from the assassination of President Juvénal Habyarimana on 6 April through mid-July, at least 800,000 people were killed according to a Human Rights Watch estimate.

As of mid-2011, the ICTR had convicted 57 people and acquitted 8. Another ten persons were still on trial while one (Bernard Munyagishari) is awaiting trial; nine remain at large. The first trial, of Jean-Paul Akayesu, ended in 1998 with his conviction for genocide and crimes against humanity. Jean Kambanda, the interim prime minister during the genocide, pleaded guilty. This was the world's first conviction for genocide, as defined by the 1948 Convention.

==== Cambodia ====
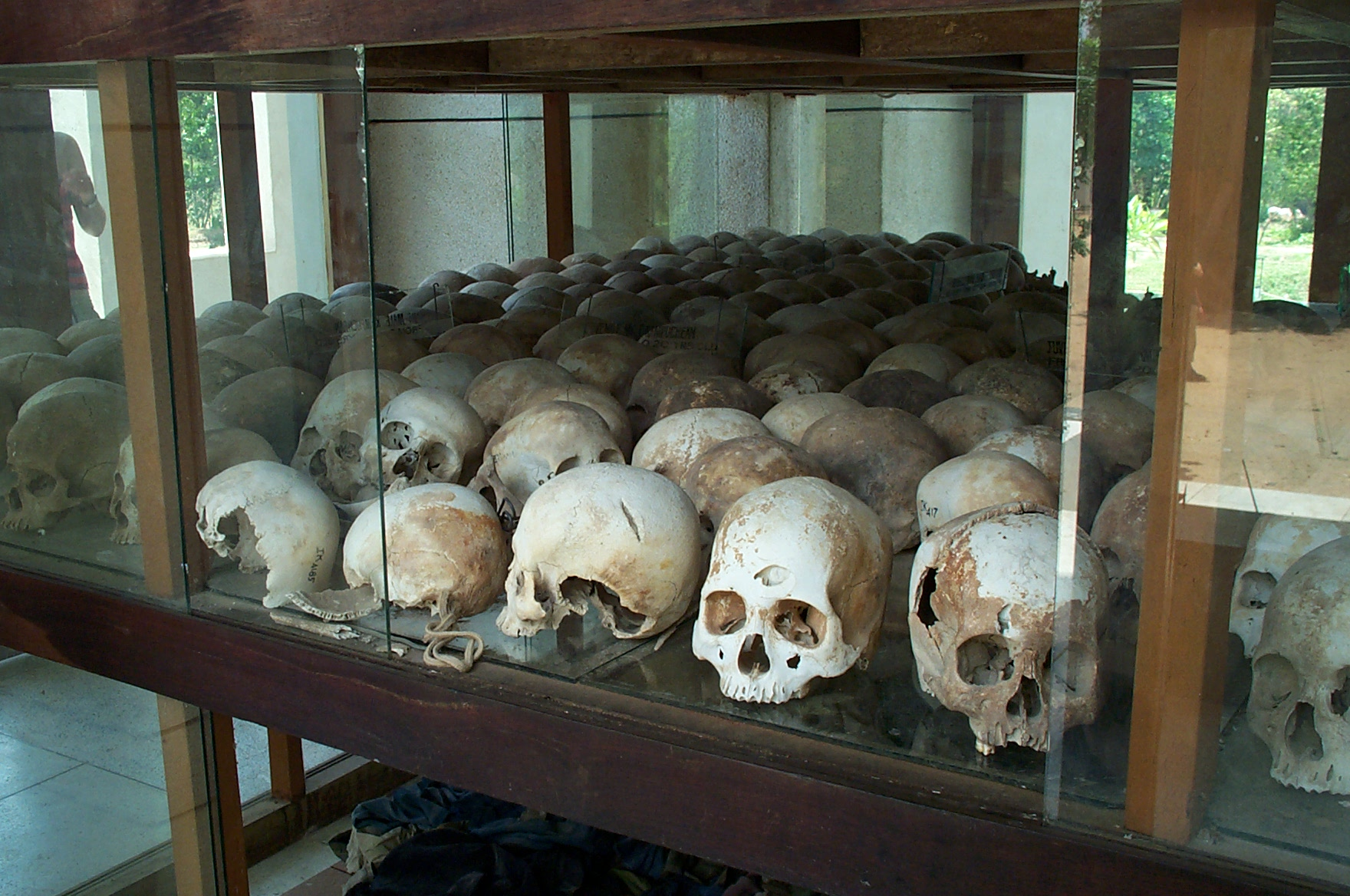
Skulls at the Choeung Ek memorial in Cambodia

The Khmer Rouge, led by Pol Pot, Ta Mok, and others, perpetrated the mass killing of ideologically suspect groups, ethnic minorities such as ethnic Vietnamese, Chinese or Sino-Khmers, Chams, and Thais, former civil servants, former government soldiers, Buddhist monks, secular intellectuals and professionals, and former city dwellers. Khmer Rouge cadres who were defeated in factional struggles were also liquidated in purges. Man-made famine and slave labor resulted in many hundreds of thousands of deaths. Craig Etcheson suggested that the death toll was between 2 and 2.5 million, with a most likely figure of 2.2 million. After spending five years excavating 20,000 grave sites, he concluded that "these mass graves contain the remains of 1,386,734 victims of execution." One researcher, Steven Rosefielde, representing a minority opinion, argued that the Khmer Rouge were not racist by claiming that they did not intend to exterminate ethnic minorities, and he also stated that the Khmer Rouge did not intend to exterminate the Cambodian people as a whole; in his view, the Khmer Rouge's brutality was the product of an extreme version of communist ideology.

On 6 June 2003, the Cambodian government and the United Nations reached an agreement to set up the Extraordinary Chambers in the Courts of Cambodia (ECCC), which would focus exclusively on crimes committed by the most senior Khmer Rouge officials during the period of Khmer Rouge rule of Cambodia from 1975 to 1979. The judges were sworn in during early July 2006. The investigating judges were presented with the names of five possible suspects by the prosecution on 18 July 2007:

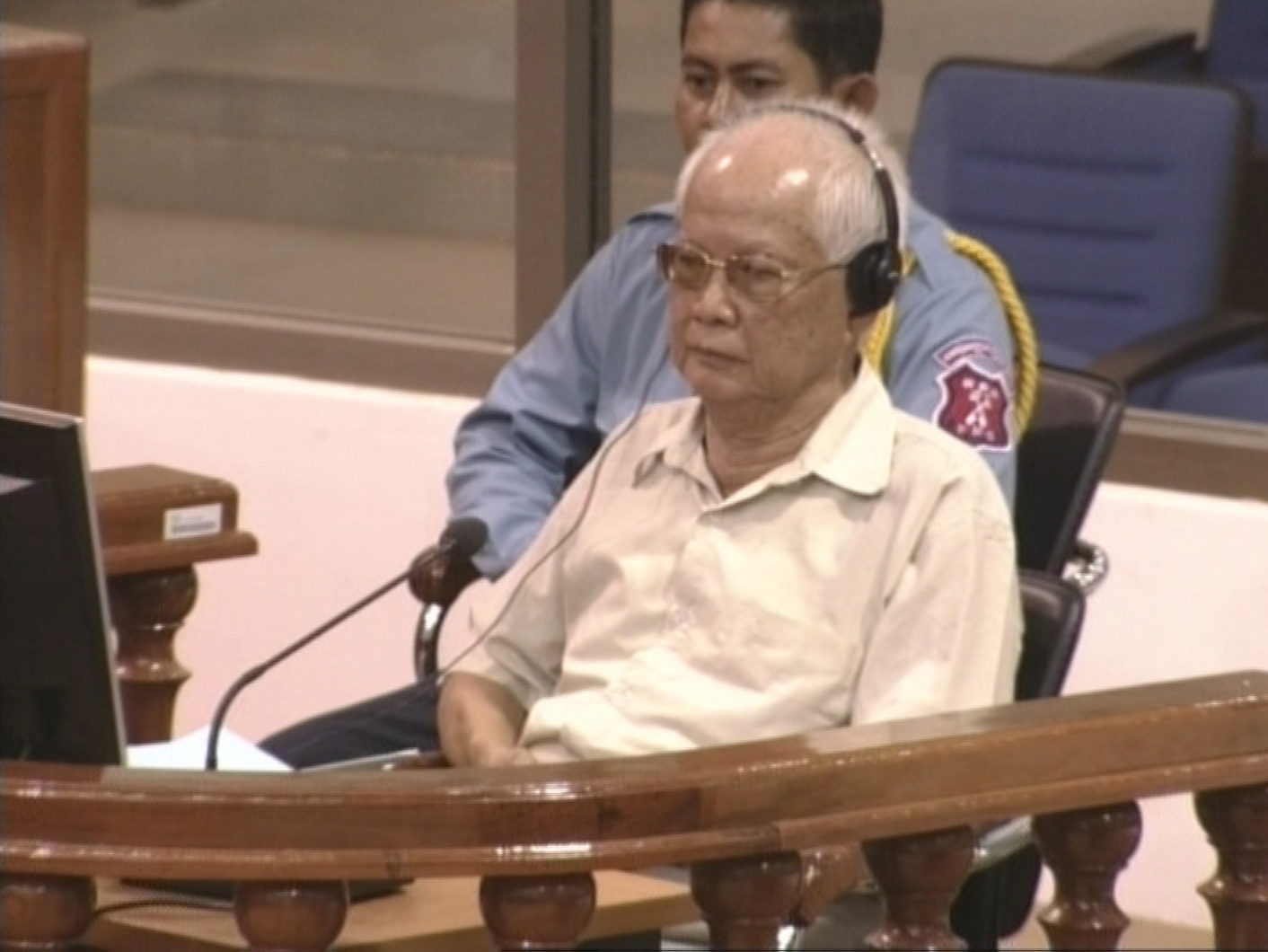
Khieu Samphan at a public hearing before the pre-trial Cambodia Tribunal on 3 July 2009

- Kang Kek Iew was formally charged with war crimes and crimes against humanity and detained by the Tribunal on 31 July 2007. He was indicted on charges of war crimes and crimes against humanity on 12 August 2008. His appeal was rejected on 3 February 2012, and he continued serving a sentence of life imprisonment.
- Nuon Chea, a former prime minister, was indicted on charges of genocide, war crimes, crimes against humanity, and several other crimes under Cambodian law on 15 September 2010. He was transferred into the custody of the ECCC on 19 September 2007. His trial began on 27 June 2011. On 16 November 2018, he was sentenced to life in prison for genocide.
- Khieu Samphan, a former head of state, was indicted on charges of genocide, war crimes, crimes against humanity, and several other crimes under Cambodian law on 15 September 2010. He was transferred into the custody of the ECCC on 19 September 2007. His trial also began on 27 June 2011. On 16 November 2018, he was sentenced to life in prison for genocide.
- Ieng Sary, a former foreign minister, was indicted on charges of genocide, war crimes, crimes against humanity, and several other crimes under Cambodian law on 15 September 2010. He was transferred into the custody of the ECCC on 12 November 2007. His trial began on 27 June 2011. He died in March 2013.
- Ieng Thirith, wife of Ieng Sary and a former minister for social affairs, was indicted on charges of genocide, war crimes, crimes against humanity, and several other crimes under Cambodian law on 15 September 2010. She was transferred into the custody of the ECCC on 12 November 2007. Proceedings against her have been suspended pending a health evaluation.

Some of the international jurists and the Cambodian government disagreed over whether any other people should be tried by the Tribunal.

=== International Criminal Court ===
The ICC can only prosecute crimes that were committed on or after 1 July 2002.

==== Darfur, Sudan ====
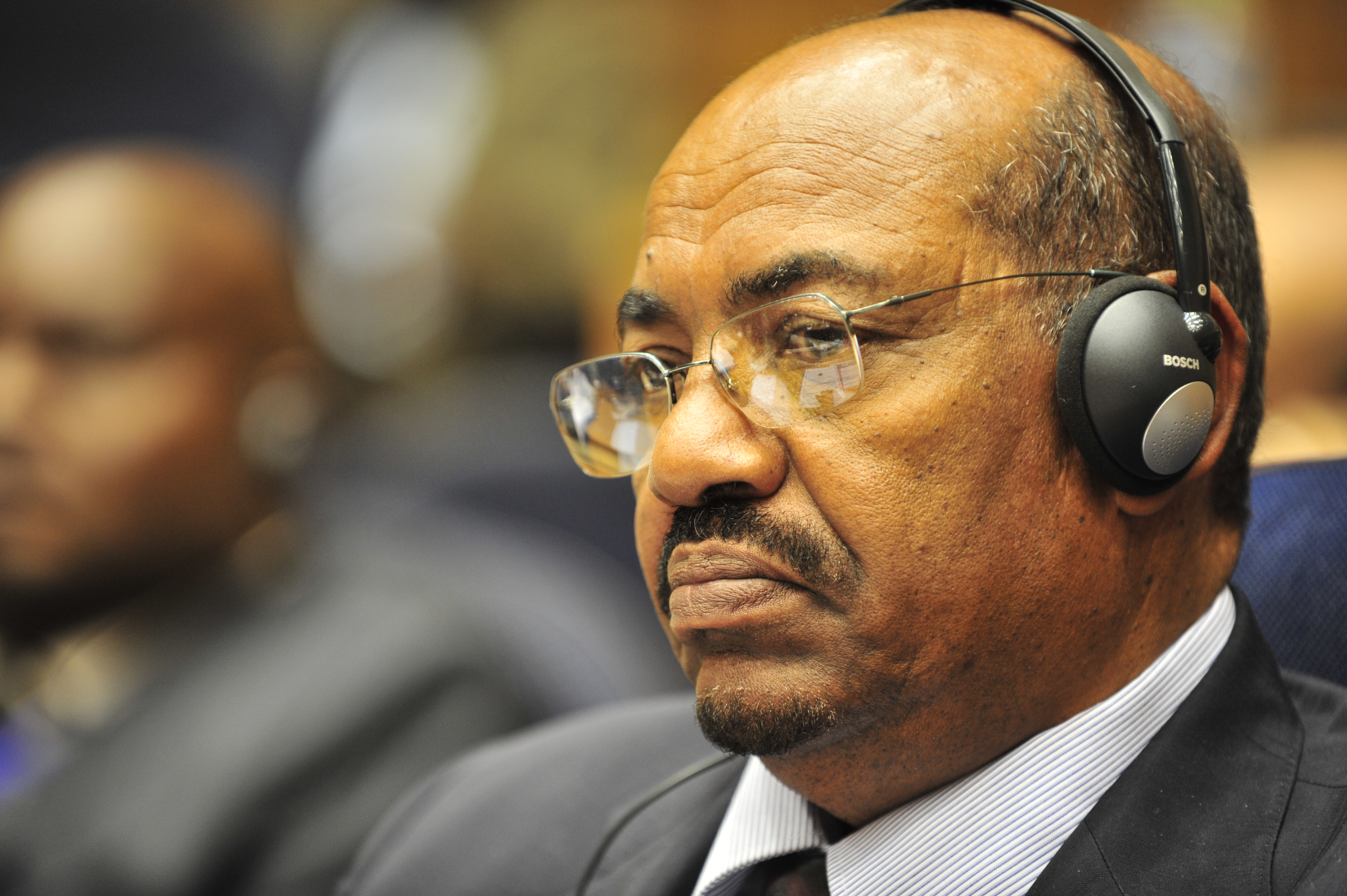
Sudanese President Omar al-Bashir, wanted by the ICC

The racial conflict in Darfur, Sudan, which started in 2003, was declared a genocide by United States Secretary of State Colin Powell on 9 September 2004 in testimony before the Senate Foreign Relations Committee. Since that time however, no other permanent member of the UN Security Council has followed suit. In January 2005, an International Commission of Inquiry on Darfur, authorized by UN Security Council Resolution 1564 of 2004, issued a report stating that "the Government of the Sudan has not pursued a policy of genocide." Nevertheless, the Commission cautioned that "The conclusion that no genocidal policy has been pursued and implemented in Darfur by the Government authorities, directly or through the militias under their control, should not be taken in any way as detracting from the gravity of the crimes perpetrated in that region. International offences such as the crimes against humanity and war crimes that have been committed in Darfur may be no less serious and heinous than genocide."

In March 2005, the Security Council formally referred the situation in Darfur to the ICC, taking into account the Commission report but without mentioning any specific crimes. Two permanent members of the Security Council, the United States and China, abstained from the vote on the referral resolution. As of his fourth report to the Security Council, the Prosecutor found "reasonable grounds to believe that the individuals identified [in the UN Security Council Resolution 1593] have committed crimes against humanity and war crimes", but did not find sufficient evidence to prosecute for genocide.

In April 2007, the ICC issued arrest warrants against the former Minister of State for the Interior, Ahmad Harun, and a Janjaweed militia leader, Ali Kushayb, for crimes against humanity and war crimes. On 14 July 2008, the ICC filed ten charges of war crimes against Sudan's president Omar al-Bashir, three counts of genocide, five of crimes against humanity, and two of murder. Prosecutors claimed that al-Bashir "masterminded and implemented a plan to destroy in substantial part" three tribal groups in Darfur because of their ethnicity. On 4 March 2009, the ICC issued a warrant for al-Bashir's arrest for crimes against humanity and war crimes but not for genocide. This is the first warrant issued by the ICC against a sitting head of state.

=== International Court of Justice ===
==== Ukraine ====
Two days after the start of the Russian invasion of Ukraine in 2022, on 26 February, Ukraine brought the case of Allegations of Genocide under the Convention on the Prevention and Punishment of the Crime of Genocide before the International Court of Justice. The case followed false Russian accusations of genocide in Donbas which genocide scholars have described as accusation in a mirror as part of a campaign of genocide incitement. The court is conducting an investigation of all allegations of genocide in Ukraine. In November 2022, Ukraine's Prosecutor General Andriy Kostin said that during the course of five proceedings on genocide by law enforcement, investigators had recorded "more than 300 facts that belong precisely to the definition of genocide".

==== Rohingya ====
On 11 November 2019, The Gambia lodged an application to the International Court of Justice against Myanmar. It alleged that Myanmar has committed mass murder, rape, and destruction against communities of the Rohingya group in Rakhine state since about October 2016 and those actions violated the Genocide Convention. On 19 November 2026, the ICJ found that Myanmar had committed genocide against the Rohingya, marking the first time a state has ever been found guilty by an international court of committing genocide. In the ruling, ICJ President Yuji Iwasawa declared that Myanmar had failed to prevent and punish genocide, detailing how the military had perpetrated "extreme violence" against Rohingya communities in Rakhine State. UN Secretary-General António Guterres welcomed the judgment as a "powerful recognition of the Rohingya victims of genocide," stating that it reaffirmed that impunity for such acts must not stand.

==== Israel ====
On 29 December 2023, South Africa filed an application instituting proceedings with the International Court of Justice against Israel, alleging that it had violated its obligations under the Convention on the Prevention and Punishment of the Crime of Genocide (the "Genocide Convention") during its 2023 offensive in the Gaza Strip. South Africa's standing is based on the erga omnes partes nature of the Genocide Convention, which allows and obligates States which are Parties to the convention to take measures to prevent and punish the crime of genocide. South Africa requested an indication of provisional measures by the court, including the order that Israel end its military operations, to "protect against further, severe and irreparable harm to the rights of the Palestinian people under the Genocide Convention", triggering an urgent preliminary hearing. Public hearings on the provisional measures question were held on 11 January (oral arguments by South Africa) and 12 January (oral arguments by Israel), respectively.

== See also ==
- Accusation in a mirror
- Anti-communist mass killings
- Anti-Mongolianism
- Black genocide in the United States – the notion that African Americans have been subjected to genocide throughout their history because of racism against African Americans, an aspect of racism in the United States
- Crimes against humanity
- Criticism of communist party rule
- Democide
- Ethnic cleansing
- Ethnic conflict
- Ethnic violence
- Ethnocentrism
- Ethnocide
- Far-left politics
- Far-right politics
- Far-right subcultures
- Genocide denial
- Genocide recognition politics
- Genocide of Christians by the Islamic State
- Genocide of indigenous peoples
- Genocide of Yazidis by the Islamic State
- Hate crime
- Hate group
- Hate media
- Hate speech
- Hate studies
- Iraqi Turkmen genocide
- List of ethnic cleansing campaigns
- List of genocides
- Mass killings under communist regimes
- Mass racial violence in the United States
- Native American genocide in the United States — the notion that Native Americans have been subjected to genocide because of racism against them, another aspect of racism in the United States
- Nativism (politics)
- Persecution of Shias by the Islamic State
- Political cleansing of population – an aspect of political violence
- Population transfer
- Racism
- Religious intolerance
- Religious discrimination
- Religious persecution
- Religious violence
- Sectarian violence
- Supremacism
- Terrorism
- War crime
- Xenophobia

== Sources ==
- Akande, Dapo; Higgins, Rosalyn; Sivakumaran, Sandesh; Webb, Philippa (2018). Oppenheim's International Law: United Nations. Oxford University Press. ISBN 978-0-192-53718-8 – via Google Books.
- Bachman, Jeffrey S. (2017). The United States and Genocide: (Re)Defining the Relationship with Genocide (E-book ed.). London: Routledge. ISBN 978-1-351-69216-8 – via Google Books.
- Bartrop, Paul R.; Jacobs, Steven Leonard, eds. (2014). Modern Genocide: The Definitive Resource and Document Collection. ABC-CLIO. ISBN 978-1-610-69364-6 – via Google Books.
- Bellamy, Alex J. (2012). Massacres and Morality: Mass Atrocities in an Age of Civilian Immunity. Oxford University Press. ISBN 978-0-199-28842-7.
- Bloxham, Donald; Moses, A. Dirk (2010). "Editors' Introduction: Changing Themes in the Study of Genocide". In Bloxham, Donald; Moses, A. Dirk (eds.). The Oxford Handbook of Genocide Studies. New York: Oxford University Press. pp. 1–15. doi:10.1093/oxfordhb/9780199232116.013.0001. ISBN 978-0-19-923211-6.
- Bryant, Michael (2020). "Canaries in the Mineshaft of American Democracy: North American Settler Genocide in the Thought of Raphaël Lemkin". Genocide Studies and Prevention. 14 (1): 21–39. doi:10.5038/1911-9933.14.1.1632. ISSN 1911-0359. Archived from the original on 3 December 2021.
- Chalk, Frank; Jonassohn, Kurt (1990). The History and Sociology of Genocide: Analyses and Case Studies. Yale University Press. ISBN 978-0-300-04446-1.
- Cooper, John (2008). Raphael Lemkin and the Struggle for the Genocide Convention. Springer.
- Farid, Hilmar (March 2005). "Indonesia's original sin: mass killings and capitalist expansion, 1965–66". Inter-Asia Cultural Studies. 6 (1). Routledge: 3–16. doi:10.1080/1462394042000326879. ISSN 1464-9373. S2CID 145130614.
- Fein, Helen (October 1993). "Revolutionary and Antirevolutionary Genocides: A Comparison of State Murders in Democratic Kampuchea, 1975 to 1979, and in Indonesia, 1965 to 1966". Comparative Studies in Society and History. 35 (4). Cambridge University Press: 796–823. doi:10.1017/S0010417500018715. ISSN 0010-4175. JSTOR 179183. S2CID 145561816.
- Forge, John (2012). Designed to Kill: The Case Against Weapons Research. Springer. ISBN 978-9400757356.
- Fraser, James E. (2010). "Early Medieval Europe: The Case of Britain and Ireland". In Bloxham, Donald; Moses, A. Dirk (eds.). The Oxford Handbook of Genocide Studies. Oxford University Press. pp. 259–279. doi:10.1093/oxfordhb/9780199232116.013.0014. ISBN 978-0-19-161361-6.
- Gangopadhyay, Partha (2016). "Economic Foundations of Religious Killings and Genocide with Special Reference to Pakistan, 1978–2012". In Anderton, Charles H.; Brauer, Jurgen (eds.). Economic Aspects of Genocides, Other Mass Atrocities, and Their Prevention. Oxford University Press. pp. 510–535. ISBN 978-0-19-937829-6.
- Gellately, Robert; Kiernan, Ben (2003). The Specter of Genocide: Mass Murder in Historical Perspective. Cambridge: Cambridge University Press. ISBN 978-0-521-52750-7 – via Google Books.
- Gerlach, Christian (2010). Extremely Violent Societies: Mass Violence in the Twentieth-Century World. Cambridge University Press. p. 6. ISBN 978-1-139-49351-2 – via Google Books.
- Hitchcock, Robert K.; Koperski, Thomas E. (2008). "Genocides against Indigenous Peoples". In Stone, Dan (ed.). The Historiography of Genocide. Palgrave Macmillan. pp. 577–618. ISBN 9781403992192.
- Hoffman, Stefan-Ludwig (2010). Human Rights in the Twentieth Century. Cambridge University Press. ISBN 978-1-139-49410-6 – via Google Books.
- Hollander, Paul (1 July 2012). "Perspectives on Norman Naimark's Stalin's Genocides". Journal of Cold War Studies. 14 (3): 149–189. doi:10.1162/JCWS_a_00250. S2CID 57560838.
- Irvin-Erickson, Douglas (2023). "The history of Raphaël Lemkin and the UN Genocide Convention". In Simon, David J.; Kahn, Leora (eds.). Handbook of Genocide Studies. Edward Elgar Publishing. pp. 7–26. doi:10.4337/9781800379343.00009. ISBN 9781800379336.
- Jones, Adam (2006). Genocide: A Comprehensive Introduction. Routledge/Taylor & Francis Publishers. ISBN 978-0-415-35385-4 – via Google Books. Excerpts Chapter 1: Genocide in prehistory, antiquity, and early modernity Archived 10 October 2017 at the Wayback Machine
- Jones, Adam (2010). "3. Genocides of Indigenous Peoples". Genocide: A Comprehensive Introduction (2nd ed.). Routledge. ISBN 978-0415486187.
- Jongman, Albert J., ed. (1996). Contemporary Genocides: Causes, Cases, Consequences. Leiden, Netherlands: Interdisciplinary Research Program on the Root Causes of Human Rights Violations.
- Kakar, Mohammed Hassan (1995). Afghanistan: The Soviet Invasion and the Afghan Response, 1979–1982. University of California Press. ISBN 978-0-5209-1914-3 – via Google Books.
- Lang, Berel (2005). "The Evil in Genocide". Genocide and Human Rights: A Philosophical Guide. Palgrave Macmillan UK. pp. 5–17. doi:10.1057/9780230554832_1. ISBN 978-0-230-55483-2.
- Lemos, T. M.; Taylor, Tristan S.; Kiernan, Ben (2023). "Introduction to Volume I". In Kiernan, Ben; Lemos, T. M.; Taylor, Tristan S. (eds.). The Cambridge World History of Genocide. Vol. 1: Genocide in the Ancient, Medieval and Premodern Worlds. Cambridge University Press. pp. 31–56. doi:10.1017/9781108655989.003. ISBN 978-1-108-65598-9.
- Maybury-Lewis, David (2002). "Genocide against Indigenous peoples". Annihilating Difference: The Anthropology of Genocide. University of California Press. ISBN 978-0520230293.
- Moses, A. Dirk (2004). Genocide and Settler Society: Frontier Violence and Stolen Indigenous Children in Australian History. Berghahn Books. ISBN 978-1571814104.
- Moses, A. Dirk (2010). "Raphael Lemkin, Culture, and the Concept of Genocide". In Bloxham, Donald; Moses, A. Dirk (eds.). The Oxford Handbook of Genocide Studies. New York: Oxford University Press. pp. 19ff. doi:10.1093/oxfordhb/9780199232116.013.0002. ISBN 978-0-19-923211-6.
- Moses, A. Dirk (2023). "Genocide as a Category Mistake: Permanent Security and Mass Violence Against Civilians". Genocidal Violence: Concepts, Forms, Impact. De Gruyter. pp. 15–38. doi:10.1515/9783110781328-002. ISBN 978-3-11-078132-8.
- Naimark, Norman M. (2017). Genocide: A World History. Oxford University Press. ISBN 978-0-19-976527-0.
- Rosenbaum, Alan S. (2001). Is the Holocaust Unique? Perspectives on Comparative Genocide (2nd ed.). Routledge. ISBN 978-0-367-00714-0.
- Rugira, Lonzen (20 April 2022). "Why Genocide is "the crime of crimes"". Pan African Review. Archived from the original on 13 June 2024.
- Schabas, William A. (2000). Genocide in International Law: The Crimes of Crimes (PDF) (1st ed.). Cambridge University Press. ISBN 0-521-78262-7. Archived from the original (PDF) on 16 June 2024.
- Schabas, William A. (2009). Genocide in International Law: The Crime of Crimes (2nd ed.). Cambridge: Cambridge University Press. ISBN 978-0-521-71900-1.
- Shaw, Martin (2015). What is Genocide?. John Wiley & Sons. ISBN 978-0-7456-8710-0.
- Staub, Ervin (1989). The Roots of Evil: The Origins of Genocide and Other Group Violence. Cambridge, UK: Cambridge University Press. ISBN 978-0-521-42214-7 – via Google Books.
- Stone, Dan (2010). Histories of the Holocaust. New York: Oxford University Press. ISBN 978-0-19-956679-2.
- Straus, Scott (2022). Graziosi, Andrea; Sysyn, Frank E. (eds.). Genocide: The Power and Problems of a Concept. McGill-Queen's University Press. ISBN 978-0-2280-0951-1.
- Towner, Emil B. (2011). "Quantifying Genocide: What Are We Really Counting (On)?". JAC. 31 (3/4): 625–638. ISSN 2162-5190. JSTOR 41709663.
- Weiss-Wendt, Anton (December 2005). "Hostage of Politics: Raphael Lemkin on 'Soviet Genocide'". Journal of Genocide Research. 7 (4). Routledge: 551–559. doi:10.1080/14623520500350017. ISSN 1462-3528. S2CID 144612446.
- When to Refer to a Situation as "Genocide" (PDF) (Report). United Nations Office on Genocide Prevention and the Responsibility to Protect. n.d.
