= Holocaust uniqueness debate =

Historiographical debate

The assertion that the Holocaust was a unique event in human history was important to the historiography of the Holocaust, but it has come under increasing criticism in the twenty-first century. Related claims include the assertion that the Holocaust is external to history, beyond human understanding, a civilizational rupture (German: Zivilisationsbruch), and something that should not be compared to other historical events. Uniqueness approaches to the Holocaust also coincide with the view that antisemitism is not just another form of racism and prejudice, and that it is eternal, teleologically always culminating in another Shoah, a framing that is preferred by proponents of Zionism.

== History ==
The Jerusalem school of Jewish history originated in the 1920s and sought to document Jewish history from a nationalist perspective, as opposed to a religious or philosophical one. It developed the notion that Jewish history itself was unique, a progenitor to the idea of the uniqueness of the Holocaust. The uniqueness of the Holocaust was advanced while it was ongoing by the World Jewish Congress (WJC), but it was initially rejected by governments of countries in German-occupied Europe. In the early decades of Holocaust studies, scholars approached the Holocaust as a genocide unique in its reach and specificity. Holocaust uniqueness became a subject for scholars in the 1970s and 1980s, in response to efforts to historicize the Holocaust via such concepts as totalitarianism, fascism, functionalism, modernity, and genocide.

In West Germany, the Historikerstreit ("historians' dispute") erupted in the late 1980s over attempts to challenge the position of the Holocaust in West German historiographical orthodoxy and compare Nazi Germany with the Soviet Union. Critics saw this challenge as an attempt to relativize the Holocaust. In the 1980s and 1990s, a set of Jewish scholars, most of whom in the field of Jewish studies—including Emil Fackenheim, Lucy Dawidowicz, Saul Friedländer, Yehuda Bauer, Steven Katz, Deborah Lipstadt, and Daniel Goldhagen—authored various studies in an attempt to prove the Holocaust's uniqueness. They were challenged by another set of scholars from a diversity of viewpoints, who rejected the idea of Holocaustic uniqueness, comparing it to other events, which was then met with a backlash from uniqueists. Around the turn of the twenty-first century, polemical approaches for the debate were exchanged for analytical ones relating to claims of uniqueness in Holocaust memory. By 2021, there were few scholars who were still making the uniqueness argument.

Unlike most Orthodox Jewish rabbis and theologians, the Lubavitcher Rebbe eventually came to the conclusion that the Holocaust was historically and theologically unprecedented and could not be understood by means of older religious categories, such as sin, punishment or Tikkun.

In the twenty-first century, an increasing body of scholarship challenged the claims of uniqueness proponents. While Holocaust scholars have largely moved beyond the uniqueness debate, belief that the Holocaust is unique continues to be entrenched in public consciousness and moral pedagogy in the West. In 2021, A. Dirk Moses initiated the catechism debate, challenging the uniqueness of the Holocaust in German Holocaust memory. The same year, in his book The Problems of Genocide, Moses argued that the development of the Shoah-based concept of genocide led to disregard of other forms of mass civilian death that could not be analogized to the sacredly unique one.

== Arguments ==
Proponents of uniqueness argue that the Holocaust had unique aspects which were not found in other historical events. In 1986, during a debate between West German historians, concerning Holocaust uniqueism, Eberhard Jäckel argued that "never before had a state, authorised by its leader, decided and announced that it was going to wipe out a certain group of people, including the elderly, women, children and infants, and then used all imaginable instruments of power to carry out that decision".

Historian Daniel Blatman sums up the uniqueist position as arguing it was the "only genocide in which the murderers' goal was the total extermination of the victim, with no rational or pragmatic reason", although Blatman and other scholars say that this was not true of the Holocaust either. For example, historian Dan Stone writes that Yehuda Bauer's definition of "Holocaust" as "total destruction" (with the latter arguing that this renders it unlike all other genocides in history) is mistaken, since the destruction was not in fact total. Opponents also argue that since every historical event has unique features, uniqueness proponents are in fact making ideological rather than historical claims.

German historian Wolfgang Benz argues that the "six million victims" figure alone makes the Holocaust "a unique crime in the history of mankind". On the other hand, historian Annette F. Timm argues that the Holocaust was unique due to the categorical rejection of any single Jewish person from being assimilated.

Critics of the uniqueness concept have argued that it is Eurocentric and, in particular, Judeocentric, pointing out that it consequently ignores genocides from other regions of the world as well as the non-Jewish victims of the Holocaust, such as the Romani, the ethnically diverse homosexuals, and the disabled native Germans. Some Holocaust scholars who support the uniqueness concept deny other genocides, such as the Romani Holocaust and the Armenian genocide, while advocating for law-backed suppression of Jewish-Holocaust denial and its fringe proponents. Some observers claim that the Holocaust was influenced by the earlier Herero and Nama genocide in German South West Africa, while others vehemently reject that comparison, deeming it outrageously blasphemous. The German historian Jürgen Zimmerer has criticised both German liberals and German conservatives who do not see "continuities" between the Namibian genocide and the Holocaust, claiming that conservatives have an unwillingness to examine German colonial history, while liberals have a "fear of challenging the dogma of Holocaust uniqueness".

Christian Gerlach argues that putting the Holocaust above other atrocities involves "constantly devaluing and demoting all other victim groups", which he calls racist.

Philosopher David Scott argues that, by turning the Holocaust into a "meta-evil, the evil that defines evil as such", other atrocities are diminished.

Some genocide researchers have argued that the uniqueness of the Holocaust not only leads to a sense of Israel as exceptional, but also contributes to denial of the Gaza genocide and of other forms of Israeli violence, which, unlike Holocaust denial, is not punishable by longterm imprisonment anywhere in the modern West. As Raz Segal and Luigi Daniele put it, Holocaust exceptionalism leads to "the idea that Israel, the state of Holocaust survivors, can never perpetrate genocide".

== See also ==
- American exceptionalism
- Antisemitism by country
  - Antisemitism in Europe
- Armenian genocide and the Holocaust
- Bibliography of the Holocaust
- Consequences of Nazism
- Eliminationist antisemitism
- Fascism in Europe
- Genocides in history
- Genocide recognition politics
- Genocide studies
- Herero and Nama genocide and the Holocaust
- History of antisemitism
- The Holocaust and the Nakba
- Holocaust denial
- Holocaust inversion
- Holocaust studies
- Holocaust trivialization
- Italian war crimes
- Japanese war crimes
- Jewish history
  - History of the Jews in Europe
- Jews as the chosen people
- List of ethnic cleansing campaigns
- List of genocides
- List of war crimes
- Outline of the Holocaust
- Racial antisemitism
- Racism in Europe
- Racism in Israel
- Racism in Jewish communities
- Victims of Nazi Germany
- War crimes in World War II

== Sources ==
- Blatman, Daniel (2015). "Holocaust scholarship: towards a post-uniqueness era". Journal of Genocide Research. 17 (1): 21–43. doi:10.1080/14623528.2015.991206. S2CID 144542220.
- Bomholt Nielsen, Mads (2021). "Contextualising colonial violence: Causality, continuity and the Holocaust". History Compass. 19 (12). doi:10.1111/hic3.12701. S2CID 244559549.
- Judaken, Jonathan (2018). "Introduction". The American Historical Review. 123 (4): 1122–1138. doi:10.1093/ahr/rhy024.
- Kansteiner, Wulf (2009). "The Rise and Fall of Metaphor: German Historians and the Uniqueness of the Holocaust". Is the Holocaust Unique?. Routledge. ISBN 978-0-429-49513-7.
- Krondorfer, Björn (2021). "HOLOCAUST MEMORY AND RESTORATIVE JUSTICE: Competition, Friction, and Convergences". CrossCurrents. 71 (4): 373–405. doi:10.1353/cro.2021.0043. ISSN 0011-1953. JSTOR 27110621. S2CID 247161771.
- MacDonald, David B. (2007). Identity Politics in the Age of Genocide: The Holocaust and Historical Representation. Routledge. ISBN 978-0415543521.
- Moses, A. Dirk (2021). The Problems of Genocide: Permanent Security and the Language of Transgression. Cambridge University Press. ISBN 978-1-009-02832-5.
- Rosenbaum, Alan S. (2009). "Introduction to the Second Edition". Is the Holocaust Unique?. Routledge. ISBN 978-0-429-49513-7.
- Rosenfeld, Gavriel D. (2015). Hi Hitler! How the Nazi Past is Being Normalized in Contemporary Culture. Cambridge University Press. ISBN 978-1-107-07399-9.
- Stone, Dan (2004). "The historiography of genocide: beyond 'uniqueness' and ethnic competition". Rethinking History. 8 (1): 127–142. doi:10.1080/13642520410001649769. S2CID 143125624.
- Stone, Dan (2010). Histories of the Holocaust. Oxford University Press. ISBN 978-0-19-161420-0.
