= The Holocaust and the Nakba =

Historiography on the two events

The Holocaust and the Nakba have been studied as interrelated events in discussions of the Israeli–Palestinian conflict, both historically and in the way these two events have influenced perceptions of the conflict by both parties.

According to a book by Grace Wermenbol, Israeli Jews see themselves as Holocaust survivors and emphasize the uniqueness of the Holocaust, often rejecting any linkage between it and the Nakba. Meanwhile, some Palestinians protest the perceived elevation of Jewish suffering over their own.

== Historical relationship ==
Prior to the Holocaust, some Zionists opposed the founding of an ethnocentric Jewish state, but their view changed during the 1940s, when they became aware of the scale of the damage which was done to the Jewish culture and religion during the Holocaust. David Ben-Gurion changed his view of Arab self-determination, deciding that it could not be allowed in a Jewish state. In one of his speeches in which he addressed the Biltmore Program, he stated that after the Holocaust, "do we not have the right this time to demand rectification for our historical indignity, for the discrimination that all the nations have committed against us, and to demand that they give us the same status as all the other nations?" In 1947 and 1948, 700,000 Palestinians—80 percent of the territory's Arab population—fled or were expelled from the territory that became Israel. Both during the Holocaust and the Nakba, there was large-scale looting of the property of the victims.

In 1949, Polish–Jewish Holocaust survivors Genya and Henryk Kowalski arrived in Israel. They were offered a formerly Palestinian house in Jaffa, but they refused to move into it. Genya Kowalski later explained, "it reminded us how we had to leave the house and everything behind when the Germans arrived and threw us into the ghetto... I did not want to do the same thing that the Germans did." Their decision to refuse looted Palestinian property was exceptional.

In discussions about the Israeli–Palestinian conflict, the Holocaust and the Nakba have been regarded as interrelated events, both historically and currently, because of the way in which these two tragedies have influenced both parties' perceptions of the conflict. Omer Bartov says "the Holocaust and the Nakba were both parallel and irreconcilable events." However, in contrast to the Holocaust, which demonstrably ended, the Nakba is considered in some conceptual frameworks to be still ongoing.

== Historiography ==
The Holocaust is a universalized memory in Western culture and has tended to block out the memory of the Nakba. According to Nina Fischer, both events "function as cultural traumas and are central to the collective memory and identity of the two peoples". Historian K. M. Fierke has pointed out that both the Hebrew word for the Holocaust, HaShoah, and the Arabic al-Nakba, translate to "the catastrophe".

=== Israel ===
According to Zionist historiography, the formation of the State of Israel in 1948 was the "culmination of the long Jewish quest for rights and justice". Israeli historian Benny Morris argues that the Zionist fighters were motivated by the Holocaust, among other factors. The Israeli view of the 1948 Arab–Israeli war holds that Israel had "no alternative" in the war and fought with purity of arms. The mainstream view in Israel is that Arabs left the country voluntarily in response to calls from the Arab leadership, though this view has been challenged by Israeli scholars such as the New Historians; some interpret it as an ethnic cleansing, while others have described it as a forced migration. These views have become more accepted by the Israeli public over time, though during periods of political upheaval they are often rejected and subject to "officially instigated attacks."

Historian Alon Confino writes that "The attempt to erase the memory of the Nakba in Israeli Jewish society has itself been an active social force, a result of enormous mobilization of political, economic, and cultural effort, from the physical destruction of Arab villages to the symbolic silence of memory in history books and public expressions." Confino states that a lesser form of Nakba denial acknowledges that a tragedy occurred while denying Zionist responsibility for it, while a more extreme version proclaims the Nakba to be a myth and "a collection of tall tales", as a publication by Im Tirzu phrased it. Confino writes of such denialism that "the Nakba is called into being, just as the Holocaust is called into being in the words of its deniers."

Portrayal of Arabs as Nazis is common in the discourse of the Arab–Israeli conflict, as is depicting Palestinian anti-Zionism as motivated by antisemitism. According to Joseph A. Massad, "Israel's insistence on its vulnerability reflected a conscious strategy". The 1961 trial of Holocaust perpetrator Adolf Eichmann was an opportunity to connect Arabs to Nazis. The descriptive Nazification of the Palestinian people was a hallmark of the policy of Menachem Begin's Likud Party. In 2015, Israeli Prime Minister Benjamin Netanyahu falsely accused the Palestinian grand mufti Amin al-Husseini of inspiring the Holocaust. His comments were criticized in Israel.

Many Israelis argue that the Holocaust and the Nakba cannot be compared. According to Shira Stav, one flaw with Israeli representations that attempt to bridge this gap is the absence of Palestinian voices and the tendency to present Israeli soldiers as traumatized victims. According to a paper by Israeli Holocaust, conflict and peace researcher Dan Bar-On and Rutgers professor Saliba Sarsar, it was only at the turn of the 21st century that Israeli Jewish and Palestinian intellectuals "found the courage" to bridge the gap, conceptually, between the Holocaust and the Nakba. On the Israeli Jewish side, Bar-On and Sarsar cite Ilan Gur-Zeev and Ilan Pappé's 2003 paper Beyond the Destruction of the Other's Collective Memory: Blueprints for a Palestinian-Israeli Dialogue as an early call for the Holocaust and the Nakba "to be examined within a mutual context", that highlighted, without claiming equivalence, "the thread that ties them to the collective psyche of both people".

=== Germany ===
After the 1952 Reparations Agreement with Germany, Moshe Sharett suggested paying some of the reparations money to Palestinian refugees. This was rejected because it would have meant linking the Holocaust and the Nakba. Ian S. Lustick argues that the Reparations Agreement could serve as a model for a future Israeli–Palestinian peace deal. Lustick argues additionally that "if reconciliation has been possible between Israel and Germany, it cannot be said to be impossible for Israel and Palestine".

Germany's criticism in the 1970s of Israel's unilateral border changes and settlement policies in the Palestinian territories it had occupied, influenced in part, it has been argued, the De facto annexation of Jerusalem in July 1980 with the Jerusalem Law. This may also have been a response to the Venice Declaration a month earlier, in June, when the European Economic Community recognized the right of Palestinians to self-determination and to participate in peace negotiations. A harsh official Israeli communiqué branded the latter as a second Munich (where European powers acknowledged the German Annexation of Sudetenland): Palestinians were framed as regenerated Nazis and Europeans favorable to their cause likened to Neville Chamberlain. When West Germany eventually moved towards recognition of the PLO and the Palestinian right to self-determination in the 1980s, Israel retaliated by again bringing up the Nazi past.

Daniel Marwecki argues that in the twenty-first century, the German "Staatsräson means viewing the Israel-Palestine conflict through the lens of German Holocaust memory", but the majority of Germans do not share this perspective.

=== Palestinian perspectives ===
In contrast, Palestinian writers draw a direct connection from the Holocaust to the Nakba and see themselves as the final victim of the Nazis. On the Palestinian side, Bar-On and Sarsar credit Azmi Bishara (1996), Edward Said (1997) and Naim Ateek (2001) as early pioneers of the notion of connecting Palestinian acknowledgement of the Holocaust to Israeli Jewish recognition of the Nakba. In his 1992 work Between Place and Space, Bishara is quoted as arguing: "In order for the victim to forgive, he must be recognized as a victim. That is the difference between a historic compromise and a cease-fire." In an essay, Said criticized the use of comparisons between the two events as a means of delegitimizing the other side or justifying present-day violence and oppression. He stated that connecting the Holocaust to the Nakba was "understanding what is universal about a human experience under calamitous conditions. It means compassion, human sympathy, and utter recoil from the notion of killing people for ethnic, religious, or nationalist reasons".

One response among Palestinians and the Arab world to the Western view of the Holocaust as the ultimate evil is Holocaust denial. According to Israeli sociologist Sammy Smooha, Holocaust denial by Palestinians is a kind of protest "to express strong objection to the portrayal of the Jews as the ultimate victim and to the underrating of the Palestinians as a victim". According to Gilbert Achcar, Israel especially and other Western countries to a lesser extent underestimate Arab expressions of sympathy for Holocaust victims.

=== International perspectives ===
Hannah Arendt wrote that the formation of Israel solved the Jewish question in Europe, but "merely produced a new category of refugees, the Arabs, thereby increasing the number of stateless stateless and rightless by another 700,000 to 800,000 people." She criticized the way that Jewish historians had portrayed Jews "not [as] history-makers but history-sufferers, preserving a kind of eternal identity of goodness whose monotony was disturbed only by the equally monotonous chronicle of persecutions and pogroms". In Shira Stav's view, this perception of Jewish history allowed the Holocaust and the Arab–Israeli conflict to be presented as parts of a continuum of persecution of Jews.

In his 2021 book The Problems of Genocide, A. Dirk Moses argues that Raphael Lemkin, who coined the term genocide and who supported Zionism, likely considered the Nakba justified in line with mainstream Zionist views. Although Lemkin championed the independence of "small nations", especially the Jews, he did not believe in granting independence to groups, such as Palestinian Arabs, that he thought were not sufficiently developed to qualify as nations. Moses also says that that the universalization of the Holocaust in the definition of genocide has served to exclude other acts—including the Nakba—from moral opprobrium. Moses writes, "Today, this regime ascribes Palestinians the role of the villains in a global drama about preventing genocide and a 'second Holocaust' for resisting colonization of and expulsion from their land."

Fierke and Moses have argued that as the Holocaust is a universalized memory in Western culture, it has tended to block out the memory of the Nakba.

Some scholars such as Moses and historian Donald Bloxham have criticized the perceived uniqueness of the Holocaust, and instead view it and the Nakba as part of broader trends of settler colonialism and ethnic nationalism leading to genocide and ethnic cleansing in the European rimlands. Bartov writes that various competing nationalisms in east-central Europe excluded Jews. Their negative treatment by non-Jewish neighbors during and after the Holocaust "by all accounts... rendered many of them indifferent and callous and at times vengeful toward the Arab population they encountered in Palestine".

The 2018 book by Jacqueline Rose, The Holocaust and the Nakba, argues that "unless we can hold these two moments in our hearts and minds as part of the same story, there can be no moving forward in the seemingly unmovable conflict that is Israel-Palestine".

According to Bashir Bashir and Amos Goldberg "a joint Arab-Jewish public deliberation on the traumatic memories of these two events is not only possible, however challenging and disruptive it may be, but also fundamental for producing an egalitarian and inclusive ethics of binationalism in Israel/Palestine".

Elias Khoury states that "The Holocaust and the Nakba are not mirror images, but the Jew and the Palestinian are able to become mirror images of human suffering if they disabuse themselves of the delusion of exclusionist, national ideologies." He views setting aside these ideologies as part of a universal struggle against racism.

== In literature ==
In his 1949 novella Hirbet Hiz'ah, S. Yizhar dealt with the expulsion of Palestinians by Israeli forces. The narrator compared the plight of Palestinian refugees to that of Jewish refugees. In an interview, Yizhar explained that the action of expelling Palestinians contradicted his earlier beliefs about what Zionism would be.

In 1952, Avot Yeshurun published the poem "Passover on Caves" in Haaretz. He later explained, "The Holocaust of European Jewry and the Holocaust of Palestinian Arabs, a single Holocaust of the Jewish People. The two gaze directly into one another's face."

In 1969, the Palestinian novelist and militant Ghassan Kanafani published the novel Return to Haifa. It depicts a Palestinian couple returning to Haifa after fleeing it during the Nakba, and encountering a Jewish couple – the husband a Holocaust survivor – who, upon finding their empty home, occupied it and raised the young boy they found there as a Jew. This son of the Palestinian couple, Dov, is conscripted into the IDF, while their other son in Ramallah has joined the PLO's fedayeen. The novel explores the tensions that arise from the interactions of these two families.

Palestinian-American writer Susan Abulhawa's bestselling novel Mornings in Jenin (2010) tells the story of a Palestinian family from the 1930s until 2002. Although the book portrays anti-Arab racism and settler colonialism, the novel's protagonists are Jewish Holocaust survivors. Nina Fischer, writing about the novel, noted that the Holocaust and the Nakba both "function as cultural traumas and are central to the collective memory and identity of the two peoples".

== See also ==
- Armenian genocide and the Holocaust
- Libyan genocide and the Holocaust
- Comparisons between Israel and Nazi Germany
- Relations between Nazi Germany and the Arab world

== Sources ==
- Bar-On, Dan; Sarsar, Saliba (2004). "Bridging the Unbridgeable: The Holocaust and Al-Nakba". Palestine – Israel Journal of Politics, Economics, and Culture. 11 (1): 63–70. ProQuest 235716101.
- Bartov, Omer (2019). "The Return of the Displaced: Ironies of the Jewish-Palestinian Nexus, 1939–49". Jewish Social Studies. 24 (3): 26. doi:10.2979/jewisocistud.24.3.02. S2CID 195481842.
- Bartov, Omer (2023). Genocide, the Holocaust, and Israel-Palestine. Bloomsbury Publishing. ISBN 978-1-3503-3234-8.
- Bashir, Bashir; Goldberg, Amos (2014). "Deliberating the Holocaust and the Nakba: disruptive empathy and binationalism in Israel/Palestine". Journal of Genocide Research. 16 (1): 77–99. doi:10.1080/14623528.2014.878114. S2CID 145797342.
- Bergen, Doris L.; Eley, Geoff; Jockusch, Laura; Ther, Philipp; Tusan, Michelle; Beck, Teresa Koloma; Bashir, Bashir; Goldberg, Amos (2021). "Bashir Bashir and Amos Goldberg, eds., The Holocaust and the Nakba: A New Grammar of Trauma and History". Central European History. 54 (1): 112–179. doi:10.1017/S0008938921000078. S2CID 230992456.
- Confino, Alon (2018). "When Genya and Henryk Kowalski Challenged History–Jaffa, 1949: Between the Holocaust and the Nakba". The Holocaust and the Nakba. Columbia University Press. ISBN 978-0-231-54448-1.
- Fierke, K.M. (2014). "Who is my neighbour? Memories of the Holocaust/ al Nakba and a global ethic of care". European Journal of International Relations. 20 (3): 787–809. doi:10.1177/1354066113497490. S2CID 146188931.
- Fischer, Nina (2020). "Entangled suffering and disruptive empathy: The Holocaust, the Nakba and the Israeli–Palestinian conflict in Susan Abulhawa's Mornings in Jenin". Memory Studies. 15 (4): 695–712. doi:10.1177/1750698019896850. S2CID 214281392.
- Ghanim, Honaida (2019). "When Yaffa Met (J)Yaffa: Intersections Between the Holocaust and the Nakba in the Shadow of Zionism". The Holocaust and the Nakba: A New Grammar of Trauma and History. Columbia University Press. pp. 92–113. doi:10.7312/bash18296-006. ISBN 978-0-231-54448-1. S2CID 165947021.
- Goldberg, Amos (2016). "Interventions: Narrative, Testimony, and Trauma". International Journal of Postcolonial Studies. 18 (3): 335–358. doi:10.1080/1369801X.2015.1042396. S2CID 143419418.
- Khoury, Nadim (2020). "Postnational memory: Narrating the Holocaust and the Nakba". Philosophy & Social Criticism. 46 (1): 91–110. doi:10.1177/0191453719839448. S2CID 150483968.
- Lustick, Ian S. (2006). "Negotiating Truth: The Holocaust, "Lehavdil", and "Al-Nakba"". Journal of International Affairs. 60 (1): 51–77. ISSN 0022-197X. JSTOR 24358013.
- Marwecki, Daniel (2020). Germany and Israel: Whitewashing and Statebuilding. Oxford University Press. ISBN 978-1-78738-318-0.
- Mikel Arieli, Roni (2020). "Between Apartheid, the Holocaust and the Nakba: Archbishop Desmond Tutu's Pilgrimage to Israel-Palestine (1989) and the Emergence of an Analogical Lexicon". Journal of Genocide Research. 22 (3): 334–353. doi:10.1080/14623528.2019.1673606. S2CID 204041778.
- Moses, A. Dirk (2021b). The Problems of Genocide: Permanent Security and the Language of Transgression. Cambridge University Press. ISBN 978-1-009-02832-5.
- Moses, A. Dirk (23 May 2021a). "The German Catechism". Geschichte der Gegenwart (in German).
- Rose, Jacqueline (2018). "Afterword: The Holocaust and the Nakba". The Holocaust and the Nakba. Columbia University Press. ISBN 978-0-231-54448-1.
- Shumsky, Dmitry (2018). Beyond the Nation-State: The Zionist Political Imagination from Pinsker to Ben-Gurion. Yale University Press. ISBN 978-0-300-24109-9.
- Stav, Shira (2012). "Nakba and Holocaust: Mechanisms of Comparison and Denial in the Israeli Literary Imagination". Jewish Social Studies. 18 (3): 85. doi:10.2979/jewisocistud.18.3.85. S2CID 144892781.
- Wermenbol, Grace (2021). A Tale of Two Narratives: The Holocaust, the Nakba, and the Israeli-Palestinian Battle of Memories. Cambridge University Press. ISBN 978-1-108-89021-2.
