= The Problems of Genocide =

2021 book by A. Dirk Moses

- Author: A. Dirk Moses
- Language: English
- Genre: Non-fiction
- Publication date: 2021

The Problems of Genocide: Permanent Security and the Language of Transgression is a 2021 book by Australian historian A. Dirk Moses. The book explores what Moses sees as flaws in the concept of genocide, which he argues allows killings of civilians that do not resemble the Holocaust to be ignored. Moses proposes "permanent security" as an alternative to the concept of genocide. The book was described as important, but his emphasis on security is considered only one factor to be causing mass violence.

== Background ==
A. Dirk Moses is an Australian historian, much of whose work has focused on genocide studies, including editing the Journal of Genocide Research. According to Moses, he decided to write the book in the mid-2000s to express his misgivings about the concept of genocide, in the form of "A non-teleological intellectual history... that exposed genocide's problematic function in obscuring the logic of 'permanent security' in what I call the 'language of transgression'." The book draws on Moses's earlier work on settler colonialism, liberal imperialism, comparative genocide studies, and the history of violence. Moses is not the first to propose alternatives to genocide; historian Christian Gerlach coined the term "extremely violent societies" to broaden attention from genocide as a state crime. The book was published about the same time as Moses initiated the catechism debate, arguing that German Holocaust remembrance has shut down criticism of colonialism and racism.

Parts of the book were translated into German and published as Nach dem Genozid. Grundlage für eine neue Erinnerungskultur ("After the Genocide. Foundations for a New Culture of Remembrance"), although one reviewer criticized German publishers for not translating the entire book.

== Content ==
Moses argues that genocide is not just a problem because of the human suffering inherent in the phenomenon, but also how the concept of genocide, because of its position as the "crime of crimes", "blinds us to other types of humanly caused civilian death, like bombing cities and the 'collateral damage' of missile and drone strikes, blockades, and sanctions".

Moses introduces the concept of "permanent security", which is distinguished from other security imperatives by being anticipatory and characterized by a paranoid threat perception. Moses distinguishes two types of permanent security, illiberal and liberal. Illiberal permanent security "entails preventative killing of presumed future threats to a particular ethnos, nation, or religion, in a bounded 'territoriality'". Liberal permanent security often develops in opposition to illiberal permanent security, and aims to secure the entire world in the name of humanity. Moses argues that permanent security underpins the three mass atrocity crimes of genocide, crimes against humanity, and war crimes, because prejudice does not cause violence without the securitization of the other. He argues that permanent security should be criminalized.

The third section of the book covers Holocaust memory and comparative genocide studies. Moses argues that the concept of genocide depoliticized earlier ways of talking about mass violence (the language of transgression), and the ongoing view of genocide as a depoliticized crime normalizes types of violence that cannot be analogized to the Holocaust.

== Reception ==
Sinja Graf praised the book as "written from an unrelenting concern for the sanctity of human lives" and "a landmark study that redefines perspectives on mass atrocities across political science, history, and international law". Syrian dissident Yassin al-Haj Saleh considers the book important and relevant for Syria and the Arab world, advocating translation into Arabic. However, he considers Moses's proposal to criminalize permanent security not feasible. Historian Taner Akçam calls the book "the most comprehensive critique produced thus far on the concept of genocide" and a foundational work.

Historian Omer Bartov described the book as "an erudite, complex, and in many parts quite fascinating read", but says that Moses fails to propose a viable alternative to the concept of genocide. Some Holocaust historians accused Moses of promoting a conspiracy theory by which Raphael Lemkin, a major supporter for the inclusion of genocide in international law, was a Jewish exclusivist and only concerned regarding the Jews under Nazi rule. However, according to Dan Stone, Moses's reading, although debatable, "is well within the norms of intellectual history"; furthermore, it is not the focus of the book.

Security studies researcher Beatrice de Graaf says that the book is "crucially important in shattering consolidated legal, political scientific and historiographical positions on genocide, international law and security". Nevertheless, she is critical of Moses's conception of permanent security, arguing that he overlooks earlier work in historical and critical security studies exploring the totalizing instinct of state security in general, and his argument would be stronger if he covered the origins of the preventative security paradigm in Europe around 1800. According to reviewer Ulrike von Hirschhausen, Moses ignores recent research on how indigenous people used the "language of transgression" to resist colonialism, and flattens the complicated reality of historical empires by presenting them as totalizing, when in fact these empires attempted to manage difference, not wipe it out.

Furthermore, Moses's focus on security has been recognized as a significant factor in incidents of genocidal violence, but is considered a monocausal explanation that cannot explain genocidal violence by itself. Von Hirschhausen states, "In the age of nationalism however, both colonisers and the colonised turned ethnicity, not security, into the most effective means to mobilise intervention in favour of or against imperial rule." Michael Wildt argues that the obsession of Nazis and other antisemites with "racial hygiene" and the euthanasia killings cannot be explained through a securitization framework. Wildt further points to Moses not engaging with the argument of Götz Aly that greed and acquisitiveness, both in terms of individual perpetrators enriching themselves and Germany's desire to dominate Europe and live on plunder, were among the primary motivators of Nazi criminality.

Ronald Grigor Suny praises Moses for exposing a "pernicious hierarchy of crimes", but says his goal is "not practicable. The word genocide is here to stay in law and language."
