= The Great Game of Genocide =

Nonfiction book by Donald Bloxham

- Author: Donald Bloxham
- Language: English
- Subject: Armenian genocide
- Genre: Non-fiction
- Publisher: Oxford University Press
- Publication date: 2005

The Great Game of Genocide: Imperialism, Nationalism, and the Destruction of the Ottoman Armenians is a 2005 non-fiction book by Donald Bloxham, published by Oxford University Press (OUP), about the Armenian genocide.

== Synopsis ==
The Great Game of Genocide focuses on the geopolitical relations between the powers of World War I and the genocide, and how some countries supported the Armenians for geopolitical reasons but ended support due to new geopolitical factors in regards to the empire and the successor, the Republic of Turkey.

The book is structured into three parts, plus an introduction. Part I, "Mass Murder in an International Context," studies the factors that led up to the genocide. Part II, "International Response and Responsibility in the Genocide Era," discusses the responsibility of international governments – specifically, western powers – for the genocide. Part III, "From Response to Recognition," details international diplomatic responses to the genocide and international politics regarding genocide denial. The final chapter also discusses how the government and people of the United States responded to the Armenian genocide, both during the time it was happening and afterwards.

The book includes an overview of relations between Ottoman Armenians and Ottoman Turks, which is significant because many other works on the topic focus solely on the genocide.

Bloxham concludes that Armenian genocide was planned intentionally by the Ottoman government

== Critical reception ==
A review in the British Journal of Middle Eastern Studies called the book "an important and timely contribution to the study of the Armenian genocide." A different review in the Nations and Nationalism journal called the book "a work of great scholarly integrity and meticulously researched empirical oversight.
