= John A. Moses =

Australian historian (1930–2024)

- Born: 10 June 1930; Atherton, Queensland, Australia
- Died: 30 May 2024 (aged 93); Canberra, Australia
- Spouse: Ingrid Moses
- Children: Dirk Moses
- Scientific career
- Fields: Modern history
- Institutions: University of Queensland

John Anthony Moses (10 June 1930 – 30 May 2024) was an Australian historian, history educator and Anglican priest. He is known for his work on modern German history, the history of trade unionism and the history of colonialism.

== Life and career ==
Moses earned his B.A. at the University of Queensland in 1959, his M.A. at the University of Queensland in 1963 and his Ph.D. at the University of Erlangen in Germany in 1965. He taught at the University of Queensland from 1965 to 1994, as a lecturer, senior lecturer (from 1970), and reader (from 1975). He was head of the history department from 1986. He also became a priest in the Anglican Church of Australia in 1978. He has been a professorial associate at St Mark's National Theological Centre in Canberra since 2007.

John A. Moses was married to Professor Ingrid Moses, former Chancellor of the University of Canberra. They were the parents of the noted historian Dirk Moses.

John A. Moses died in Canberra on 30 May 2024, at the age of 93.

== Selected works ==
- The Politics of Illusion: The Fischer Controversy in German Historiography, Barnes & Noble, 1975
- Germany in the Pacific and Far East, 1870–1914, ed. with Paul Kennedy, University of Queensland Press, 1977
- Historical Disciplines and Culture in Australia, ed., University of Queensland Press, 1979
- Trade Unionism in Germany from Bismarck to Hitler: 1869–1918, George Prior Publishers, 1982
- Trade Unionism in Germany from Bismarck to Hitler: 1919–1933, George Prior Publishers, 1982
- Trade Union Theory from Marx to Walesa, Berg, 1990
- The German Empire and Britain's Pacific Dominions 1871–1919, ed. with Christopher Pugsley, Regina Books, 2000
- The Reluctant Revolutionary: Dietrich Bonhoeffer's Collision with Prusso-German History, Berghahn Books, 2009
