= Racial century =

Racial century is a term that has been used by historians to refer to the century between 1850 and 1950, especially in the context of postcolonial studies. The term employs race and racism as the primary category of analysis of global, national, and local affairs.

The term was originally proposed by Dirk Moses, who describes the "racial century" as "a single modernization process of accelerating violence related to nation-building that commenced in the European colonial periphery and culminated in the Holocaust." Moses argues that colonial genocides and mass exterminations of the 20th century should be seen as a unified process. The term has gained increasing acceptance in postcolonial studies since the early 2000s.
