= Catechism debate =

Debate about the uniqueness of the Holocaust

The Catechism Debate, also known as Historikerstreit 2.0, is a debate in Germany about Holocaust remembrance initiated by Australian historian A. Dirk Moses with his 2021 essay "The German Catechism". In the debate, Moses challenges the uniqueness of the Holocaust. In May through August 2021, scholars reacted to Moses's thesis in The New Fascism Syllabus in a series of reflections curated by Jennifer V. Evans and Brian J Griffith.

== Moses' theses ==
Dirk Moses' article, "The German Catechism", was published in May 2021 in the online journal Geschichte der Gegenwart (The History of Today) and republished in English on the website The New Fascism Syllabus. The article outlines the "German catechism" as including these five "credal" beliefs:

1. The Holocaust is unique because it was the unlimited Vernichtung der Juden um der Vernichtung willen (exterminating the Jews for the sake of extermination itself) distinguished from the limited and pragmatic aims of other genocides. It is the first time in history that a state had set out to destroy a people solely on ideological grounds.
2. It was thus a Zivilisationsbruch (civilizational rupture) and represents a break with the moral foundation of the nation.
3. Germany has a special responsibility to Jews in Germany, and a special loyalty to Israel: "Die Sicherheit Israels ist Teil der Staatsräson unseres Landes" (Israel’s security is part of Germany’s reason of state).
4. Antisemitism is a distinct prejudice — and was a distinctly German one. It should not be confused with racism.
5. Anti-Zionism is antisemitism.

Moses argues that going through a process of internalizing and confronting Holocaust exceptionalism was an important phase in the politics of memory in post-Nazi Germany that arose from historiographic, presentational and cultural breakthroughs in the 1980s, especially in the United States and eventually migrated into German consciousness in the 21st century. However, according to Moses' argument, this way of situating the Nazi Final Solution in relation to other genocides and mass-violence has become an impediment to thinking and investing in global justice and security because it makes slippery distinctions between what happened in the death camps and what happened in—for example—the colonies of the Global South during the period of European and American imperialism, what happened to Native Americans under the regime of manifest destiny, and can be an impediment to thinking clearly about the problems which now confront us in the Israel-Palestine conflict.

== The debate ==
A variety of responses have registered in the discussion that arose in the wake of this proposal. The first reactions appeared in the blog New Fascism Syllabus where various historians, including English-speaking ones, expressed their views: mixed but mostly positive. Helmut Walser Smith, on the other hand, was decidedly critical: he agreed with the assessment of Patrick Bahner that Moses is the "Sieferle of the left". Moses' opinion that the movement commemorating and educating people on Nazi crimes is composed of "'68ers" and "elites" was widely criticized; Walser Smith, for instance, says it is a much broader movement than implied by Moses.

== See also ==
- Anti-antisemitism in Germany
- Anti-antisemitism
- Secondary antisemitism
- The Final Solution
- Holocaust
- Holocaust uniqueness debate
- Zionism
- Anti-Zionism
- Colonialism
