= Wendy McCarthy =

Australian businesswoman

Wendy McCarthy AC

Chancellor of the University of Canberra
- In office 1 January 1996 – 31 December 2005
- Preceded by: Donald Horne
- Succeeded by: Ingrid Moses

Personal details
- Born: Wendy Elizabeth Ryan; 22 July 1941 (age 85) Orange, New South Wales
- Spouse: Gordon McCarthy
- Children: Sophie McCarthy; Hamish McCarthy; Sam McCarthy
- Education: University of New England
- Profession: Teacher; Businesswoman; Company director; University administrator

Wendy Elizabeth McCarthy AC (born 22 July 1941) is an Australian businesswoman, activist and former university administrator. McCarthy has worked for reform across the public, private and community sectors, in education, family planning, human rights, public health, and overseas aid and development, as well as in conservation, heritage, and media. She was Chancellor of the University of Canberra from 1996 to 2005.

== Early life and education ==
Wendy Elizabeth McCarthy was born on 22 July 1941 in Orange, New South Wales.

After attending Forbes High School, at the age of 16 McCarthy was awarded a teacher scholarship to attend the University of New England and began her professional life as a secondary school teacher, teaching in Sydney, London and Pittsburgh.

== Career ==
McCarthy's first experience as a political lobbyist came about in 1968 when, newly pregnant, she and her husband joined the Childbirth Education Association, campaigning for, among other issues, the rights of fathers to be present at the births of their children.

In 1972 she established the NSW branch of the Women's Electoral Lobby, before taking on the role of Education, Information and Media Officer with Family Planning Association of NSW in 1975, and eventually that of CEO of the Australian Federation of Family Planning Associations. She was appointed to the National Women's Advisory Council in 1978, a new office that was to advise Prime Minister Malcolm Fraser on policy issues affecting women.

McCarthy's career as an advocate for women was advanced during a period of significant reform and change when she served as the deputy chair of the Australian Broadcasting Corporation (1983-1991), while also working as General Manager Communications with the Australian Bicentennial Authority (1985-1989).

In the education sector, McCarthy was the first woman appointed to the NSW Higher Education Board, and also served on the NSW Education Commission. She was a founding member of Chief Executive Women, an organisation established to mentor and support female executives, and served as its president during 1995-96.

In 1995 she was appointed to the Economic Planning Advisory Commission's four-member task force to the prime minister on Australia's child care needs to 2010.

McCarthy's leadership in the public and women's health sectors continued with her role as chair of the National Better Health for All and associated National Better Health Program Management Committee (1989–1992). A decade later she was a member NSW Health Care Advisory Council, chair NSW Health Participation Council, and co-chair of the NSW Sustainable Access Health Priority Taskforce.

In 1999 McCarthy founded McCarthy Management, a leadership development and mentoring business. Her daughter Sophie joined her in the business, which they renamed McCarthy Mentoring in around 2007. Sophie acquired the business from Wendy in 2012.

== Other roles ==
McCarthy has represented Australia at conferences on women's health and leadership, education, broadcasting, conservation and heritage. McCarthy is an experienced speaker and facilitator, and has regularly commented on social and political issues.

From 1995 to 2005 she was Chancellor of the University of Canberra.

She was a member of the Royal College of Physicians Research and Education Foundation (1991-1994), president of the Royal Hospital for Women Foundation (1995-1998) and as a patron of the Australian Reproductive Health Alliance (2007-2011). McCarthy has served as the chair of the Pacific Friends of the Global Fund to fight AIDS, Tuberculosis and Malaria (2007-2015).

International appointments include four years was Chair of the Advisory Committee of World Health Organization's Kobe Centre in Japan from 1999 to 2002. She also spent 12 years as chair of Plan Australia (1998-2009), with three years as Global Deputy Chair with Plan International (2007-2009).

Other significant appointments include services as the CEO of the National Trust of Australia NSW (1990-1993); chair of the Australian Heritage Commission (1995–1998); a member of the Sydney Symphony Orchestra Council and subsequently chair of Symphony Australia; a director of the Australian Multicultural Foundation; and a director of Star City.

As of 2015 McCarthy was deputy chair of Goodstart Early Learning, and a non-executive director of IMF Bentham, a litigation funder.

In June 2016 she stepped down after eight years as chair of headspace – the National Youth Mental Health Foundation; and in 2017 stepped down as chair of Circus Oz, after nine years in the role.

As of June 2024 she is a member of the advisory group of 1 Million Women, a group focused on climate change activism.

== Publications ==
McCarthy is the author of a number of books, including her memoirs Don't Fence Me In published by Random House in 2000 and Don't Be Too Polite, Girls published by Allen & Unwin in 2022.

== Recognition and honours ==
- 1989: Officer of the Order of Australia, for outstanding contributions to community affairs, women's affairs and the Bicentennial celebrations
- 1996: Honorary doctorate from the University of South Australia
- 1998: Distinguished Alumni Award, University of New England
- 2003: Centenary of Federation medal, for business leadership
- 2005: Listed as one of The Sydney Morning Herald's Top 100 Public Intellectuals in Australia
- 2011: Featured in the International Women's Day publication The Power of 100: One Hundred Women Who Have Shaped Australia, which profiled 100 women who have shaped Australia
- 2013: Inaugural inductee of the Women's Agenda Hall of Fame, for her contribution to the lives of Australian women
- 2025: Companion of the Order of Australia, for "eminent service to children and youth, to health, to the arts, to business, to the community, and to women's leadership"

== Personal life ==
In December 1964, Wendy Ryan married Gordon McCarthy born 17 March 1940, whom she met on a blind date in September 1963. He died on 19 August 2017. Their three children are Sophie McCarthy, Hamish, and Sam McCarthy.

Academic offices
Preceded by Donald Horne	Chancellor of the University of Canberra; 1996 – 2005	Succeeded by Ingrid Moses
