= Ingrid Moses =

Australian academic

Ingrid Moses AO

Chancellor of the University of Canberra
- In office 1 January 2006 – 31 December 2010
- Preceded by: Wendy McCarthy
- Succeeded by: John McKay

Personal details
- Born: 15 July 1941 (age 85) Aurich, Lower Saxony, Germany
- Citizenship: Australian
- Education: University of Erlangen-Nuremberg; University of Queensland; Darling Downs College of Advanced Education
- Profession: Academic

Ingrid Moses AO (born 15 July 1941), an Australian academic and former university administrator, is an emeritus professor at the University of Canberra. After a long academic career in Australia, Moses served as the Chancellor of the University of Canberra between 2006 and 2011.

== Biography ==
Moses was born in Aurich, Germany. She studied at the University of Erlangen-Nuremberg, graduating in 1965 with a Diplom-Sozialwirt (Dipl.-Soz.wirt) degree, the equivalent to master's degree in Social Sciences. Migrating to Australia in 1966 she graduated from the University of Queensland with a Master of Arts in 1978. She earned a Graduate Diploma in Tertiary Education from the Darling Downs College of Advanced Education in 1980. She completed her PhD from the University of Queensland in 1986.

From 1977 to 1988 she was a Graduate Assistant, Lecturer and Senior Lecturer in the Tertiary Education Institute of the University of Queensland. She was Founding Director of the Centre for Learning and Teaching at the University of Technology Sydney between 1988 and 1993, and Professor of Higher Education from 1990. She also was Deputy Vice-Chancellor and Pro Vice-Chancellor (Academic) at the University of Canberra from May 1993 to June 1997. From 1 July 1997 until 7 January 2006 she was Vice-Chancellor and President of the University of New England in Armidale, New South Wales. Upon her appointment as chancellor of the University in Canberra, Moses succeeded Wendy McCarthy who had held the position for ten years. When Chancellor, she was conferred with the title of Emeritus Professor in 2006.

She was awarded a Centenary Medal for her contribution to rural education in 2003, made an Honorary Fellow, Australian Council for Educational Leaders, 2005, was awarded an honorary DLitt for contribution to higher education research and international work, California State University, Sacramento, 2003, appointed Fellow, Australian College of Educators (ACE), 1997, Fellow, Society for Research into Higher Education, 2003, and awarded Doctor of Letters (DLitt) honoris causa from UTS in 2003.

She was President of the International Association of University Presidents (IAUP) 2002-2005; Member of the Council of the University of the South Pacific, 2000-2006; Member of Council, United Nations University, 1995-2201, and Chair of Council 1998-1999; Board Member, Australian Universities Quality Agency, 2001-2207; Member, Second and Third Regional Women's Advisory Council to Deputy Prime Minister.

In retirement she has been active in a range of social, cultural and diocesan organisations, incl two terms as Chair of Board, Anglicare NSW South, NSW West and ACT.

=== Personal life ===
She married the historian John A. Moses and is the mother of the historian Dirk Moses and of Rolf Moses, CEO of the Law Society of Queensland.

== Awards and recognition ==
- Centenary Medal, 2001 "for service to rural education".
- Officer of the Order of Australia (AO), 2018 Australia Day Honours, "for distinguished service to higher education through senior academic management positions in Australian universities, and to a range of community and church organisations".

Academic offices
Preceded by Wendy McCarthy	Chancellor of the University of Canberra; 2006–2011	Succeeded by John McKay
