= Dan Bar-On =

Israeli psychologist (1938–2008)

- דן בר-און
- Born: October 3, 1938; Haifa, Mandatory Palestine
- Died: September 4, 2008 (aged 69); Tel Aviv, Israel
- Education: Ben-Gurion University; Hebrew University of Jerusalem
- Children: 4

Dan Bar-On (Hebrew: דן בר-און; October 3 in Haifa, 1938 – September 4, 2008 in Tel Aviv) was an Israeli psychologist, therapist, and Holocaust and conflict and peace researcher.

== Biography ==
Dan Bar-On was born in Haifa, British Mandate Palestine (part of modern-day Israel) in 1938. Both his parents had immigrated from Nazi Germany in 1933. Before the army, he attended an agricultural high school for two years. For 25 years he lived in Kibbutz Revivim in the Negev where he tended fruit trees, and studied behavioral sciences at Ben Gurion University of the Negev (BGU) in Beer Sheva, Israel. In 1975, he received his MA and worked as a therapist in the kibbutz clinic, specializing in work with families of Holocaust survivors and their children and doing research in this field of work. This later led to his book Fear and Hope: Three Generations of the Holocaust (1998).

In 1981, he received his PhD from the Hebrew University in Jerusalem, and in 1983 he earned a Fulbright scholarship at the Massachusetts Institute of Technology (MIT) in Cambridge, MA. He became a lecturer in behavioral sciences at BGU, and since 1996 was Professor of Psychology and held the David Lopatie Chair for Post-Holocaust Psychological Studies. Twice he was chosen to be Chair of the Department of Behavioral Sciences. He retired in 2007.

In 1987, he travelled to Germany, interviewed children of Nazi criminals, and wrote Legacy of Silence: Encounters with Children of the Third Reich (1989). This book, first published in English, was translated into German, French, Hebrew, and Japanese. Some of Dan Bar-On's German research participants formed a self-help group who met on a regular basis. In 1992 he suggested that they meet with a group of Holocaust survivors. This became the group "To Reflect and Trust" (TRT) where children of Holocaust survivors and children of Nazi perpetrators met. Later, they expanded to groups in other conflict areas (South Africa, Northern Ireland, and Israel/Palestine).

He published several books on dialogue in conflict situations and worked for mutual understanding in the Israeli–Palestinian conflict. In 1998, together with Palestinian Professor Sami Adwan, he founded and co-chaired PRIME: Peace Research Institute in the Middle East in Beit Jala in the Palestinian Authority Territory. In cooperation with six Israeli and six Palestinian school teachers, they prepared a school text book which contrasted Israeli and Palestinian views on recent Middle Eastern History and allowed students to learn the others’ views and insert their own. He also trained mediators for dialogue in conflict in different areas of the world.

He was married, a father of four, and a grandfather. He died in 2008.

== Legacy ==
In June 2024, Bar-On's daughter Yaarah gave his tape recordings as a gift to the Jena Centre for Reconciliation Studies at the University of Jena. They will be digitized and made available by the Thuringian University and State Library for future research.

== Awards and honors ==
- 1999: Honorary Doctorate, Stockton College, New Jersey (USA)
- 2001: Order of Merit of the Federal Republic of Germany
- 2001: International Alexander Langer Award (Italy, with Sami Adwan)
- 2003: Erich Maria Remarque Peace Award (Germany, with Mahmoud Darwish)
- 2005: Victor Goldberg Award for Peace in the Near East (USA, with Sami Adwan)

== Bibliography ==
=== Books ===
- Legacy of Silence: Encounters with Children of the Third Reich. Cambridge, Massachusetts and London, England: Harvard University Press 1989. ISBN 0-674-52185-4. (New Intro for German Edition, 2003)
- Fear and Hope: Three Generations of the Holocaust. Cambridge, Massachusetts and London, England: Harvard University Press 1995. ISBN 978-0674295223.
- The Indescribable and the Undiscussable: Reconstructing Human Discourse after Trauma. Budapest: Central European University Press 1998. ISBN 9789639116337.
- (with Julia Chaitin) Parenthood and the Holocaust. Jerusalem: Yad Vashem 2000. ISBN 965-308-133-0.
- (Editor) Bridging the Gap: Story Telling as a Way to Work through Political and Collective Hostilities. Hamburg: Edition Körber-Stiftung 2000. ISBN 3-89684-030-4.
- With Adwan, Sami; Musallam, Adnan; Naveh, Eyal; Steinberg, Shoshana (2003). Learning each other's historical narrative: Palestinians and Israelis (PDF). Beit Jallah: PRIME - Peace Research Institute in the Middle East.
- Tell Your Life Story: Creating Dialogue among Jews and Germans, Israelis and Palestinians. Budapest: Central European University Press 2006. ISBN 978-963-7326-70-7.
- The Other Within Us: Constructing Jewish-Israeli Identity. Cambridge, England: Cambridge University Press 2008. ISBN 9780521881876.
- Bar-On, Dan; Chaitin, Julia (2008). Parenthood and the Holocaust. Wallstein, 2008. Göttingen: Wallstein. ISBN 978-3-8353-0288-4. (Summary)
- With Adwan, Sami; Naveh, Ayal (2012). Parallel Histories in Israel-Palestine. New York: The New Press. ISBN 978-1-59558-683-4.

=== Articles and Book Chapters ===
- "Holocaust Perpetrators and Their Children: A Paradoxical Morality". Journal of Humanistic Psychology. 29 (4): 424–443. 1989. doi:10.1177/0022167889294002.
- "Children of perpetrators of the Holocaust: working through one's own moral self". Psychiatry. 53 (3): 229–245. 1990. doi:10.1080/00332747.1990.11024506. PMID 2217649.
- With Amalia, Gaon (1991). ""We Suffered Too": Nazi Children's Inability to Relate to the Suffering of the Victims of the Holocaust". Journal of Humanistic Psychology. 31 (4): 77–95. doi:10.1177/002216789131 (inactive 25 August 2025).
- With Rosenthal, Gabriele (1992). "A Biographical Case Study of a Victimizer's Daughter's Strategy: Pseudo-Identification With the Victims of the Holocaust". Journal of Narrative and Life History. 2 (2): 105–127. doi:10.1075/jnlh.2.2.02bio.
- "First Encounter Between Children of Survivors and Children of Perpetrators of the Holocaust". Journal of Humanistic Psychology. 33 (4): 6–14. 1993. doi:10.1177/00221678930334002.
- "Descendants of Nazi Perpetrators: Seven Years after the First Interviews". Journal of Humanistic Psychology. 36 (1): 55–74. 1996. doi:10.1177/00221678960361006.
- With Amir, Marianne (1996). "Hypertension and quality of life: The disease, the treatment or a combination of both". Psychology & Health. 11 (5): 685–695. doi:10.1080/08870449608404997.
- Bar-On, Dan (1996). "Who Am I in Relation to My Past, in Relation to the Other". In Danieli, Yael (ed.). International Handbook of Multigenerational Legacies of Trauma. New York: Springer. pp. 97–116. doi:10.1007/978-1-4757-5567-1_6. ISBN 978-1-4419-3287-7.
- "Studying the Trans-Generational After Effects of the Holocaust in Israel". Journal of Personal and Interpersonal Loss. 1 (3): 215–247. 1996. doi:10.1080/10811449608414384.
- With Yitzhaki-Verner, Tali; Sharon, Amir (1996). "'The recruited identity': The influence of the Intifada on the perception of the Peace Process from the standpoint of the individual". Journal of Narrative and Life History. 6 (3): 193–223. doi:10.1075/jnlh.6.3.01the.
- Bar-On, Dan (1996). "Attempting to overcome the intergenerational transmission of trauma: Dialogue between descendants of victims and of perpetrators". In Apfel, Roberta; Simon, Bennett (eds.). Minefields in their hearts: The mental health of children in war and communal violence. Yale: Yale University Press. pp. 165–188. ISBN 9780300065701.
- "Book Review: Mass hate, by Neil Kressel". Aggressive Behavior. 23 (2): 131–133. 1997. doi:10.1002/(SICI)1098-2337(1997)23:2<131::AID-AB4>3.0.CO;2-Q.
- "The Israeli society between the culture of death and the culture of life". Israel Studies. 2 (2): 88–112. 1998.
- With Sagy, Shifra; Orr, Emda (1999). "Individualism and Collectivism in Israeli Society: Comparing Religious and Secular High-School Students". Human Relations. 52 (3): 327–348. doi:10.1177/001872679905200303.
- With Chaitin, Julia (1999), Discussions Between Israeli and German Students on the Implications of the Holocaust (PDF), Jerusalem: Yad Vashem
- With Alon, Lazar; Amir, Marianne (2000). "Quantitative assessment of response shift in QOL research". Social Indicators Research. 49 (1): 37–49. doi:10.1023/A:1006933612340. JSTOR stable/27522422.
- Bar-On, Dan (2000). "Cultural Identity and Demonization of the Relevant Other. Lessons from the Palestinian-Israeli Conflict". In Shalev, Arieh Y.; Yehuda, Rachel; McFarlane, Alexander C. (eds.). International Handbook of Human Response to Trauma. New York: Springer. pp. 115–125. doi:10.1007/978-1-4615-4177-6_8. ISBN 978-1-4613-6873-1.
- Bar-On, Dan (2000), "Cultural Identity and Demonization of the Relevant Other. Lessons from the Palestinian-Israeli Conflict", in Arieh, Y. Shalev; Rachel, Yehuda; McFarlane, Alexander C. (eds.), International Handbook of Human Response to Trauma, New York: Springer, pp. 115–125, doi:10.1007/978-1-4615-4177-6_8, ISBN 978-1-4613-6873-1
- With Dragonas, Thalia (2000). "National Identity among a Neighboring Quartet: The Case of Greeks, Turks, Israelis, and Palestinians". Journal of Modern Greek Studies. 18 (2): 335–353. doi:10.1353/mgs.2000.0026.
- "The Bystander, in relation to the victim and the perpetrator: Today and during the Holocaust". The Journal of Social Justice. 14 (2): 125–148. 2001. doi:10.1023/A:1012836918635.
- With Sagy, Shifra; Orr, Emda; Awwad, Elia (2001). "Individualism and Collectivism in Two Conflicted Societies: Comparing Israeli-Jewish and Palestinian-Arab High School Students". Youth & Society. 33 (1): 1–30. doi:10.1177/0044118X01033001 (inactive 25 August 2025).
- "The Silence of Psychologists or why is there no 'Post-Zionist' Israeli Psychology?". Political Psychology. 22 (2): 331–345. 2001. doi:10.1111/0162-895X.00242.
- With Chaitin, Julia (2002). "Emotional memories of Family Relationships during the Holocaust". Journal of Loss and Trauma. 7 (4): 299–326. doi:10.1080/1081144029005770 (inactive 26 September 2025).
- "An Analysis of the Group Process in Encounters between Jews and Palestinians Using a Typology for Discourse Classification". International Journal of Intercultural Relations. 26 (2): 199–214. 2002. doi:10.1016/S0147-1767(01)00047-5.
- With Maoz, Ifat (2002). "From Working Through the Holocaust to Current Ethnic Conflicts: Evaluating the TRT Group Workshop in Hamburg". Group. 26 (1): 29–48. doi:10.1023/A:1015595027902. JSTOR stable/41718996.
- With Albeck, Joseph H.; Adwan, Sami (2002). "Dialogue Groups: TRT's Guidelines for Working Through Intractable Conflicts by Personal Storytelling". Peace and Conflict: Journal of Peace Psychology. 8 (6): 301–322. doi:10.1207/S15327949PAC0804_01.
- With Chaitin, Julia; Obeidi, Fida; Adwan, Sami (2002). "Environmental work and peace work: The Palestinian – Israeli case". Peace and Conflict Studies. 9 (2): 64–94. doi:10.46743/1082-7307/2002.1027.
- With Litvak-Hirsch, Tal; Chaitin, Julia (2003). "Whose House is This? Dilemmas of Identity Construction in the Israeli-Palestinian Context". Peace and Conflict: Journal of Peace Psychology. 9 (2): 127–148. doi:10.1207/S15327949PAC0902_02.
- "Genocidal mentalities have to be developed". The Aegis Review on Genocide. 1 (1): 15–19. 2003.
- With Kassem, Fatma (2004). "Storytelling as a Way to Work Through Intractable Conflicts: The German-Jewish Experience and Its Relevance to the Palestinian-Israeli Context". Journal of Social Issues. 60 (2): 289–306. doi:10.1111/j.0022-4537.2004.00112.x.
- Bar-On, Dan (2004). "Will the Parties Conciliate or Refuse? The Triangle of Jews, Germans, and Palestinians". In Bar-Siman-Tov, Yaacov (ed.). From Conflict Resolution to Reconciliation. Oxford University Press. pp. 239–254. doi:10.1093/acprof:oso/9780195166439.003.0012. ISBN 978-0-19-516643-9.
- With Lazar, Alon; Chaitin, Julia; Gross, Tamar (2004). "Jewish Israeli Teenagers, National Identity, and the Lessons of the Holocaust". Holocaust and Genocide Studies. 18 (2): 188–204. doi:10.1093/hgs/18.2.188.
- With Sawada, Aiko; Chaitin, Julia (2004). "Surviving Hiroshima and Nagasaki - Experiences and Psycho-social Meanings. Psychiatry". Psychiatry. 67 (1): 43–60. doi:10.1521/psyc.67.1.43.31249. PMID 15139585.
- With Maoz, Ifat; Bekerman, Zvi; Jaber-Massarwa, Summer (2004). "Learning about 'good enough' through 'bad enough': A story of a planned dialogue between Israeli Jews and Palestinians". Human Relations. 57 (9): 1075–1101. doi:10.1177/0018726704047139.
- With Adwam, Sami (2006). "The Prime shared History Project: Peace-Building Project Under Fire" (PDF). In Iram, Yaacov; Wahrman, Hillel; Gross, Zehavit (eds.). Educating Toward a Culture of Peace. Emerald Publishing Limited. pp. 309–323. ISBN 978-1-59311-483-1.
- With Litvak-Hirsch, Tal (2006). "To Rebuild Lives: A Longitudinal Study of the Influences of the Holocaust on Relationships Among Three Generations of Women in One Family". Family Process. 45 (4): 465–483. doi:10.1111/j.1545-5300.2006.00183.x. PMID 17220115.
- With Hirsch, Tal Litvak (2007). "Encounters in the Looking-glass of Time: Longitudinal Contribution 19 of a Life Story Workshop to the Dialogue between Jewish and Arab Young adults in Israel". Peace and Conflict Studies. 14 (1): 19–41. doi:10.46743/1082-7307/2007.1076.
- "Tornades et tourbillons des rivières de la vie" [Tornadoes and whirlpools of the rivers of life]. Nouvelle revue de psychosociologie (in French). 2007 (1): 41–62. 2007. doi:10.3917/nrp.003.0041.
- With Maoz, Ifat; Yihya, Siham (2007). "'They Understand Only Force'. A Critical Examination of the Erruption of Verbal Violence in a Jewish-Palestinian Dialogue". Peace and Conflict Studies. 14 (2): 109–136. doi:10.46743/1082-7307/2007.1081.
- With Glasner-Heled, Galia (2009). "Eliezer Greenbaum: The construction of a story of a Kappo in the frame of memorizing the Holocaust in Israel. Alpayim". Shofar (in Hebrew). 27 (2): 1–23. doi:10.1353/sho.0.0222. JSTOR stable/42944445.
- With Lazar, Alon; Litvak-Hirsch, Tal; Beyth-Marom, Ruth (2009). "Through psychological lenses: University students' reflections following the "Psychology of the Holocaust" course". Educational Review. 61 (1): 101–114. doi:10.1080/00131910802684854.
- With Steinberg, Shoshana (2009). "The Other Side of the Story: Israeli and Palestinian Teachers Write a History Textbook Together". Harvard Educational Review. 79 (1): 104–112. doi:10.17763/haer.79.1.y20h1445444q4511.
- "Dealing with the Past and Transitional Justice" (PDF). Berghof Glossary on Conflict Transformation. 20 notions for theory and practice. Berlin: Berghof Foundation. 2012. pp. 111–115. ISBN 978-3-941514-36-2.
- With Rom, Eldad (2012). "Combat stress reactions during the 1948 war: a conspiracy of silence?". Israel Affairs. 18 (4): 645–651. doi:10.1080/13537121.2012.717394.
