= Bernard Munyagishari =

Rwandan genocide suspect

- Born: c. 1959 (age 66–67); Gisenyi, Ruanda-Urundi
- Occupation: Military
- Political party: MRND
- Allegiance: Rwanda
- Conviction: Crime Against Humanity
- Penalty: Life imprisonment (2017)

Details
- Date apprehended: 25 May 2011

Bernard Munyagishari is a Hutu man accused of having had a prominent role in the 1994 Rwandan genocide. According to the 2005 indictment against him, as a commander of the Interahamwe, he created a special unit for the rape and murder of Tutsi women. and also the massacre of Rwanda Patriotic Front led by Paul Kagame. He was arrested on 26 May 2011 in eastern Democratic Republic of Congo., he was 52 years old at the time of his arrest.

And he was transferred to the ICTR on July 24, 2013. His case has been detained due to numerous obstacles. He argued that since he was Congolese, he did not understand the Rwandan language, Kinyarwanda. On April 20, 2017, he was sentenced to life imprisonment by the judges of the ICTR. He appealed, the appeal process is still pending.

In 2020, Munyagishari was transferred back to Rwanda. In front of the appeals court, he pleaded guilty of genocide.
