= Helmut Walser Smith =

American historian (born 1962)

Helmut Walser Smith (born 10 December 1962, in Freiburg in Breisgay) is a German academic.

Smith was named in 2004 to the Martha Rivers Ingram chair as Professor of History at Vanderbilt University. His teaching and writing focus on modern German history, especially the long nineteenth century. He has served on the editorial boards of Central European History and the Journal of Modern History and in 2011–12 was past president of the Conference Group on Central European History of the American Historical Association. From 2005 to 2008, he was Director of the Robert Penn Warren Center for the Humanities at Vanderbilt and in 2014 received a Guggenheim Fellowship.

Smith earned a B.A. at Cornell University in 1984, and received his PhD from Yale University in 1992, where his 1991 dissertation was on nationalism and religion in Wilhelmine Germany.

== Selected works ==
- Smith, Helmut Walser (1995). German Nationalism and Religious Conflict: Culture, Ideology, Politics, 1870-1914. Princeton Legacy Library. Princeton: Princeton University Press. ISBN 978-1-4008-6389-1.
- Smith, Helmut Walser (2003). The Butcher's Tale: Murder and Anti-Semitism in a German Town (1st ed.). New York, London: W. W. Norton & Company. ISBN 978-0-393-32505-8.
- Smith, Helmut Walser, ed. (2001). Protestants, Catholics, and Jews in Germany, 1800-1914. Oxford; New York: Berg. ISBN 978-1-85973-560-2.
- Hoffmann, Christhard; Bergmann, Werner; Smith, Helmut Walser (2002). Exclusionary Violence: Antisemitic Riots in Modern German History. University of Michigan Press. doi:10.3998/mpub.10760. ISBN 978-0-472-09796-8.
- Smith, Helmut Walser, ed. (2002). The Holocaust and other genocides: history, representation, ethics (1st ed.). Nashville Tenn: Vanderbilt University Press. ISBN 978-0-8265-1402-8.
- Smith, Helmut Walser (2008). The continuities of German history: nation, religion, and race across the long nineteenth century. Cambridge New York: Cambridge University Press. ISBN 978-0-511-81719-9.
- Smith, Helmut Walser, ed. (2011). The Oxford handbook of modern German history. Oxford: Oxford University Press. ISBN 978-0-19-923739-5.
- Smith, Helmut Walser (2016). Germany: A Nation in Its Time: Before, During, and After Nationalism, 1500-2000. Liveright. ISBN 9781324091547.
- Smith, Helmut Walser (16 August 2005). "The Vanishing Point of German History: An Essay on Perspective". History & Memory. 17: 269–295. doi:10.1353/ham.2005.0020.
