= A. Dirk Moses =

Australian historian (born 1967)

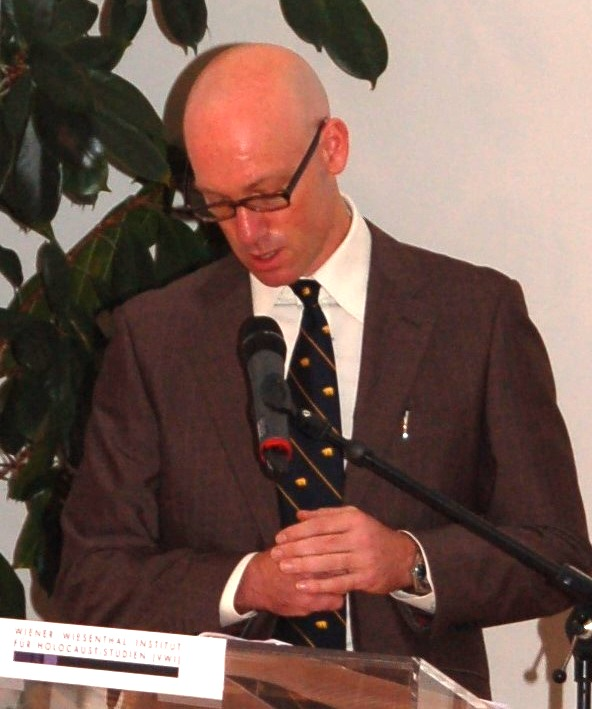
- Moses during a presentation in 2010
- Born: Anthony Dirk Moses; 1967 (age 58–59); Brisbane, Queensland, Australia
- Parents: Ingrid Moses; John A. Moses

Academic background
- Education: University of Queensland; University of St Andrews; University of Notre Dame; University of California, Berkeley
- Thesis: The Forty-fivers (2000)
- Doctoral advisor: Martin Jay

Academic work
- Discipline: History; genocide studies
- Sub-discipline: History of colonialism; history of genocide
- Institutions: University of Freiburg; University of Sydney; European University Institute; City College of New York
- Notable works: The Problems of Genocide
- Notable ideas: Racial century German catechism Permanent security
- Website: dirkmoses.com

Anthony Dirk Moses (born 1967) is an Australian scholar who researches various aspects of genocide. In 2022 he became the Anne and Bernard Spitzer Professor of Political Science at the City College of New York, after having been the Frank Porter Graham Distinguished Professor of Global Human Rights History at the University of North Carolina at Chapel Hill. He is a leading scholar of genocide, especially in colonial contexts, as well as of the political development of the concept itself. He is known for coining the term racial century in reference to the period 1850–1950. He is editor-in-chief of the Journal of Genocide Research.

== Early life and education ==
Dirk Moses is the son of Ingrid Moses, former chancellor of the University of Canberra, and the noted historian John A. Moses.

Moses received his Bachelor of Arts degree in history, government, and law at the University of Queensland in 1987. He received a Master of Philosophy degree in early modern European history at the University of St Andrews in 1989, a Master of Arts degree in modern European history at the University of Notre Dame in 1994, and a Doctor of Philosophy degree in modern European history at the University of California, Berkeley, in 2000. His dissertation focuses on how West German intellectuals debated the Nazi past and democratic future of their country.

== Career ==
From 2000 to 2010 and 2016 to 2020, he taught at the University of Sydney, where he became professor of history in 2016. Between 2011 and 2015, he was detached to the European University Institute as the Chair of Global and Colonial History. In July 2020, Moses was named the Frank Porter Graham Distinguished Professor of Global Human Rights History at the University of North Carolina at Chapel Hill.

In 2004-05 he completed a fellowship at the Charles H. Revson Foundation at the Center for Advanced Holocaust Studies at the US Holocaust Memorial Museum for his project on “Racial Century: Biopolitics and Genocide in Europe and Its Colonies, 1850-1950.” In 2007 he was an Alexander von Humboldt Foundation Fellow at the Zentrum für Zeithistorische Forschung in Potsdam, and in 2010 a fellow at the Woodrow Wilson International Center for Scholars in Washington, D.C. He was a visiting fellow at the WZB Berlin Social Science Center for Global Constitutionalism in September–October 2019, and senior fellow at the Lichtenberg-Kolleg in Göttingen in winter 2019–20.

He has been senior editor of the Journal of Genocide Research since 2011, and co-edits the War and Genocide book series for Berghahn Books. He is a member of the editorial boards of the Journal of African Military History, Journal of Perpetrator Research, Patterns of Prejudice, Memory Studies, Journal of Mass Violence Research, borderland e-journal, and Monitor: Global Intelligence of Racism. He also serves on the advisory boards of the Vienna Wiesenthal Institute for Holocaust Studies, the University College Dublin Centre for War Studies, the Memory Studies Association, and the RePast project. He is also a friend of the International State Crime Initiative.

== Research ==
Taken as a whole, Moses' work engages in a critical history of modernity on several fronts. In his book, German Intellectuals and the Nazi Past (2007), Moses examined the West German phenomenon of "coming to terms with the past", arguing that it assumed the status of a universal model for liberal internationalism. At the same time, he recovered Raphael Lemkin's broad understanding of genocide and applied it to the ignored case of settler colonialism. He has written extensively on the genocides of indigenous peoples in Australia and Canada, and he has integrated the Nazi Third Reich and Holocaust into a global context of empire building and counterinsurgency. This work, particularly the anthology Empire, Colony, Genocide (2008), is widely cited and has helped set new research agendas.

Moses has written extensively about the applicability of the term genocide on Australian frontier violence and the Holocaust. For instance, he edited Genocide and Settler Society: Frontier Violence and Stolen Aboriginal Children in Australian History (2004). This book collects illustrations of Australian genocide and positions them in a larger universal context. Moses shows how colonial violence unfolds by explaining it as form of extreme counterinsurgency.

Moses describes genocide as a "politicized concept that distorts historical understanding through manipulation of truth" (War and Genocide book series, 2004). He also highlights limitations of the term genocide, suggesting how "historians can deploy it in the service of scholarship" (War and Genocide, 2012). This view is elaborated in The Problems of Genocide: Permanent Security and the Language of Transgression (2021). In it Moses argues that international criminal law as well as genocide remembrance and prevention occlude the strategic logic of mass violence that secured Western global dominance over the past 500 years. Moses argues further that the concept of genocide's proximity to the Holocaust effectively depoliticizes the global understanding of civil war and anti-colonial struggles because it focuses on racial hatred. He argues that "atrocity crimes", with genocide as the "crime of crimes", screens out the actual security imperatives that drive state violence.

Regarding his view that the term "genocide" is often misused for political purposes, Moses states:

In the public consciousness of international law, you have a hierarchy with genocide at the top, so obviously victim groups want to go for the gold standard. That is appalling because crimes against humanity are themselves extremely serious. That's why [crimes against humanity] were a major indictment in the Nuremberg trials - they covered what is now called the Holocaust.

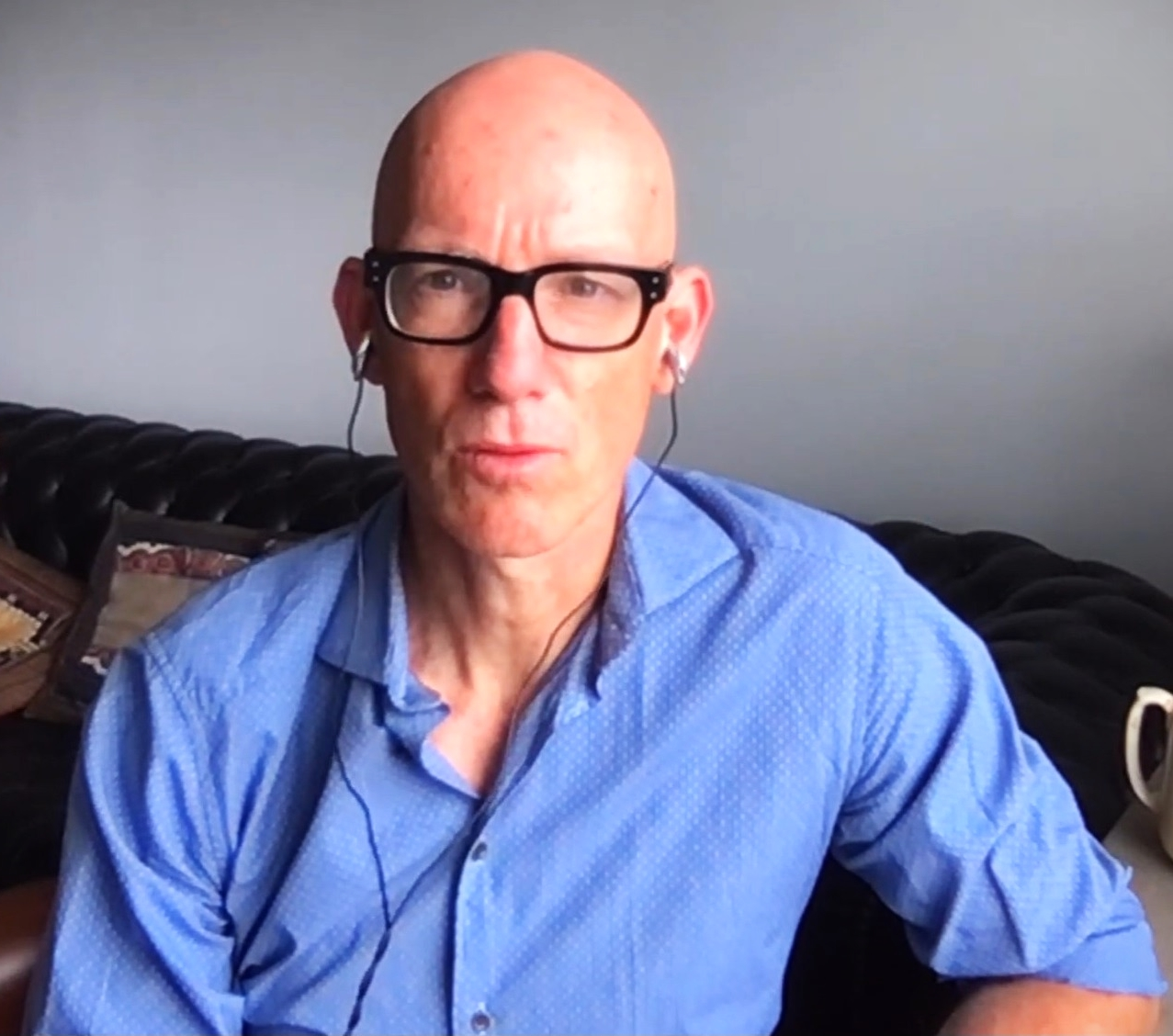
Moses on This is Germany in 2021

Generally Moses criticizes older paradigms in genocide studies for being "a moralizing discourse that tried to explain genocide by ascribing evil intentions to political leaders". Instead, he argues, "For reasons of state, leaders of virtually any government can engage in mass violence against civilians to assure the security of their borders and their civilians." What makes such crises genocidal, he says, is "the aspiration for permanent security, which entails the end of politics, namely the rupture of negotiation and compromise with different actors. Permanent security means the destruction or crippling of the perceived threatening other." He adapted the phrase from Nazi Holocaust perpetrator Otto Ohlendorf, who stated during his trial that he killed Jewish children because otherwise they would grow up to avenge their parents. It was necessary to kill the children to achieve permanent security, Ohlendorf argued. Moses states that "permanent security is a deeply utopian and sinister imperative", which has not been sufficiently examined by security studies, and that instead of genocide (which privileges victims of racial murder over other kinds of killings of civilians) "permanent security should be illegal".

In May 2021, Moses returned to his work on German intellectuals with a short article in the Swiss journal Geschichte der Gegenwart, in which he criticized an authoritarian moralization of the Nazi Holocaust that targeted people of colour. That article intensified the so-called "Second Historians' Dispute" (or "Historikerstreit 2.0") about the relationship between the Holocaust, colonial genocide, and Germany's relationship to Israel and Palestine. Over the following months many historians and journalists published their thoughts, pro and con, in the pages of German newspapers (especially the Berliner Zeitung and Die Zeit), and in English on the blog New Fascism Syllabus.

== Publications ==
=== Books ===
- Moses, A. Dirk (2007). German intellectuals and the Nazi past. Cambridge: Cambridge University Press. ISBN 978-0-511-51190-5. OCLC 191719860.
- Moses, A. Dirk (2021). The Problems of Genocide: Permanent Security and the Language of Transgression. Cambridge University Press. ISBN 978-1-009-02832-5.

=== Edited and co-edited books ===
- Decolonization, Self-Determination, and the Rise of Global Human Rights Politics (Cambridge: Cambridge University Press, 2020).
- Antōniou, Giōrgos; Moses, A. Dirk (2018). The Holocaust in Greece. New York. ISBN 978-1-108-67990-9. OCLC 1060605809.
- Postcolonial Conflict and the Question of Genocide: The Nigeria-Biafra War, 1967–1970 (Abingdon: Routledge, 2018)(with Bart Luttikhuis).
- Colonial Counterinsurgency and Mass Violence: The Dutch Empire in Indonesia (Abingdon: Routledge, 2014).
- The Oxford Handbook of Genocide Studies (Oxford: Oxford University Press, 2010).
- Genocide: Critical Concepts in Historical Studies, six vols. (Abingdon: Routledge, 2010).
- The Modernist Imagination: News Essays in Intellectual History and Critical Theory (New York and Oxford: Berghahn Books, 2009).
- Colonialism and Genocide (London: Routledge, 2007/paperback 2008). Contributing co-editor with Dan Stone. ISBN 9780415464154.
- Genocide and Settler Society: Frontier Violence and Stolen Indigenous Children in Australian History (New York: Berghahn Books, 2004/paperback 2005).
- Empire, Colony, Genocide: Conquest, Occupation and Subaltern Resistance in World History (New York and Oxford: Berghahn Books, 2008/paperback 2009). This book won the H-Soz-Kult Book Prize – Non-European History Category in 2009.

=== Selected articles and chapters ===
- "More than Genocide". Boston Review. 14 November 2023. "The law occludes the abhorrent violence routinely perpetrated by states in the name of self-defense."
- "Fit for Purpose? The Concept of Genocide and Civilian Destruction", in: Donald Bloxham and A. Dirk Moses (eds.), Genocide: Key Themes (Oxford University Press, 2022), 12–44.
- "Der Katechismus der Deutschen", in: Geschichte der Gegenwart, 23 May 2021.
- "Decolonisation, Self-Determination, and the Rise of Global Human Rights Politics", (2020).
- “The Nigeria-Biafra War: Postcolonial Conflict and the Question of Genocide, 1967-1970,” in A. Dirk Moses and Lasse Heerten, eds., Postcolonial Conflict and the Question of Genocide: The Nigeria-Biafra War, 1967–1970 (New York and London: Routledge, 2018), 3-43. Written with Lasse Heerten.
- Moses, A. Dirk (2017). "Empire, Resistance, and Security: International Law and the Transformative Occupation of Palestine". Humanity. 8 (2). Project Muse: 379–409. doi:10.1353/hum.2017.0024. hdl:1814/59625. ISSN 2151-4372. S2CID 148877062.
- “Das römische Gespräch in a New Key: Hannah Arendt, Genocide, and the Defense of Republican Civilization", Journal of Modern History, 85:4 (2013), 867-913.
- Moses, A. Dirk (2011). "Genocide and the Terror of History". Parallax. 17 (4). Informa UK Limited: 90–108. doi:10.1080/13534645.2011.605583. ISSN 1353-4645. S2CID 170954767.
- "Toward a Theory of Critical Genocide Studies." In: Jacques Semelin (ed.), Online Encyclopedia of Mass Violence. (2008)(pp. 1-5).
- "Genocide And Settler Society in Australian History." In Dirk Moses (ed.), Genocide and Settler Society: Frontier Violence and Stolen Indigenous Children in Australian History, (pp. 3-48). New York: Berghahn Books, 2004.
- “Conceptual Blockages and Definitional Dilemmas in the Racial Century: Genocide of Indigenous Peoples and the Holocaust,” Patterns of Prejudice, 36:4 (2002), 7-36. Extracted in Berel Lang and Simone Gigliotti, eds., The Holocaust: A Reader (Oxford: Blackwell, 2005), 449-63. Reprinted in A. Dirk Moses and Dan Stone, eds., Colonialism and Genocide (Abingdon: Routledge, 2007), 148-180.
- “Coming to Terms with the Past in Comparative Perspective: Germany and Australia,” Aboriginal History, 25 (2001), 91-115. Reprinted in Russell West and Anja Schwarz, eds., Polycultural Societies and Discourse: Interdisciplinary Perspectives from Australia and Germany (Amsterdam and New York: Rodopi, 2007), 1-30.
