= Donald Bloxham =

British historian

Donald Bloxham FRHistS (born 1973) is a Professor of Modern History, specialising in genocide, war crimes and other mass atrocities studies. He is the editor of the Journal of Holocaust Education.

He completed his undergraduate studies at Keele and postgraduate studies at Southampton, where he received a PhD in history. He worked as Research Director of the London-based Holocaust Educational Trust. He is Richard Pares Professor of European History at the University of Edinburgh, having previously been lecturer of Twentieth Century History at the university.

From 2007 to 2008, he was J.B. and Maurice C. Shapiro Senior Scholar-in-Residence at the United States Holocaust Memorial Museum.

== Awards ==
- 2006 Philip Leverhulme Prize
- 2007 Edinburgh University Chancellor's Award
- 2007 Raphael Lemkin Award by the International Association of Genocide Scholars

== Books ==
- Genocide on Trial: War Crimes Trials and the Formation of Holocaust History and Memory (Oxford University Press, 2001)
- The Great Game of Genocide: Imperialism, Nationalism, and the Destruction of the Ottoman Armenians (Oxford University Press, 2005)
- The Holocaust: Critical Historical Approaches (Manchester University Press, 2005)
- Genocide, The World Wars, and the Unweaving of Europe: essays by Donald Bloxham (Vallentine, Mitchell and Co., 2008)
- The Final Solution: A Genocide (Oxford University Press, 2009)
- The Oxford Handbook of Genocide Studies (editor, with A. Dirk Moses) (Cambridge University Press, 2010)
- Political Violence in Europe's Long Twentieth Century (editor, with Robert Gerwarth) (Cambridge University Press, 2011)
- Why History? A History (Oxford University Press, 2020)
- History and Morality (Oxford University Press, 2020)
