= Dan Stone (historian) =

English historian (born 1971)

Dan Stone (born 1971) is an English historian. He is professor of Modern History at Royal Holloway, University of London, and director of its Holocaust Research Institute. Stone specializes in 20th-century European history, genocide, and fascism. He is the author or editor of several works on Holocaust historiography, including Histories of the Holocaust (2010) and an edited collection, The Historiography of the Holocaust (2004).

== Early life and education ==
Stone was born in Lincoln, and raised in Birmingham. He completed his bachelor's and doctoral degrees at the University of Oxford, followed by a junior research fellowship at New College, Oxford. Subsequently, he secured a lectureship at Royal Holloway, University of London.

== Selected works ==
- (2001), ed. Theoretical Interpretations of the Holocaust. Amsterdam: Editions Rodopi BV.
- (2002). Breeding Superman: Nietzsche, Race and Eugenics in Edwardian and Interwar Britain. Liverpool: Liverpool University Press.
- (2003). Responses to Nazism in Britain, 1933–1939: Before War and Holocaust. Basingstoke and New York: Palgrave Macmillan.
- (2003). Constructing the Holocaust: A Study in Historiography. London and Portland: Vallentine Mitchell.
- (2004), ed. The Historiography of the Holocaust. Basingstoke and New York: Palgrave Macmillan.
- (2006). History, Memory and Mass Atrocity: Essays on the Holocaust and Genocide. London and Portland: Vallentine Mitchell.
- (2008), ed. The Historiography of Genocide. Basingstoke: Palgrave Macmillan.
- (2010). Histories of the Holocaust. Oxford: Oxford University Press.
- (2013). The Holocaust, Fascism and Memory: Essays in the History of Ideas. Basingstoke and New York: Palgrave Macmillan.
- (2014). Goodbye to All That? The Story of Europe since 1945. Oxford: Oxford University Press.
- (2015). The Liberation of the Camps: The End of the Holocaust and its Aftermath. New Haven and London: Yale University Press.
- (2017). Concentration Camps: A Short History. Oxford: Oxford University Press.
- (2023). The Holocaust: An Unfinished History. London: Pelican Books.
- (2023). Fate unknown: Tracing the Missing after World War II and the Holocaust Oxford: Oxford University Press.
