= Christian Gerlach =

Swiss historian

Hans Christian Gerlach is a professor of Modern History at the University of Bern. Gerlach is also Associate Editor of the Journal of Genocide Research and author of multiple books dealing with the Hunger Plan, the Holocaust, and genocide.

== Writings ==
His books include Krieg, Ernährung, Volkermord: Forschungen zur Deutschen Vernichtungspolitik im Zweiten Weltkrieg (1998); Kalkulierte Morde: die Deutsche Wirtschafts- und Vernichtungspolitik in Weissrussland 1941 bis 1944 (1999); Das letzte Kapitel (co-authored with and Götz Aly in 2002); and Sur la conférence de Wannsee (2002).

== Work and views ==
Gerlach's article "Extremely Violent Societies: An Alternative to the Concept of Genocide" has been the subject of great debate among scholars of genocide and violence. In the article, Gerlach challenges the model utilized in trying to understand genocide. Gerlach has previously stirred intense debate among Holocaust historians with his thesis surrounding 12 December 1941, as the date on which Adolf Hitler made the decision to annihilate the Jews of Europe.

Gerlach continues to oppose the concept of genocide. His history of the Holocaust, The Extermination of the European Jews, does not use the term, and in a 2023 interview with the World Socialist Web Site he called genocide "an analytically worthless concept made for political purposes" and "an instrument of liberal imperialism".

Gerlach is also known for his critical attitude towards the national-conservative resistance in Nazi Germany. According to Gerlach, the resistance offered by officers such as Claus von Stauffenberg and Henning von Tresckow, who were responsible for the assassination attempt on Hitler on 20 July 1944, was insincere, and Tresckow and many other resistance fighters were heavily implicated in Nazi war crimes.

Gerlach's thesis was criticized by a number of scholars, among them Peter Hoffmann from McGill University and Klaus Jochen Arnold, from the Konrad-Adenauer-Stiftung, a political party foundation associated with the Christian Democratic Union of Germany (CDU). In 2011, Danny Orbach, a Harvard based historian, wrote that Gerlach's reading of the sources is highly skewed, and, at times, diametrically opposed to what they actually say. In one case, according to Orbach, Gerlach had falsely paraphrased the memoir of the resistance fighter Colonel Rudolf Christoph Freiherr von Gersdorff, and in another case, quoted misleadingly from an SS document. Hence, Orbach concludes that Gerlach's thesis on the German resistance is highly unreliable.

Other historians agree with Gerlach's findings. For example, the research by Johannes Hürter, a historian at the Institute for Contemporary History in Munich, confirms the culpability of the staff of Army Group Centre in war crimes and Nazi atrocities. In his work Auf dem Weg zur Militaeropposition: Tresckow, Gersdoff, der Vernichtungskrieg und der Judenmord ("Resistance in the Military: Tresckow, Gersdoff, the War of Extermination and the Murder of Jews"), Huerter analyzes documents on the relationship of Army Group Centre with the Einsatzgruppe B in 1941. He concludes that Tresckow and his circle of conspirators within the Army Group Centre were well informed about the mass murder of Jews following Operation Barbarossa and provided required cooperation. Their national-conservative ideology was aligned with the Nazi regime in its anti-communism, accompanied by racial prejudice against Slavs and Jews. Only when it became apparent that the defeat was imminent, and that Germany would be held responsible for its genocidal policies, did so-called ethical considerations come into play, he finds.
