= Outline of the Holocaust =

Overview of and topical guide to the Holocaust

The Holocaust
- Part of World War II
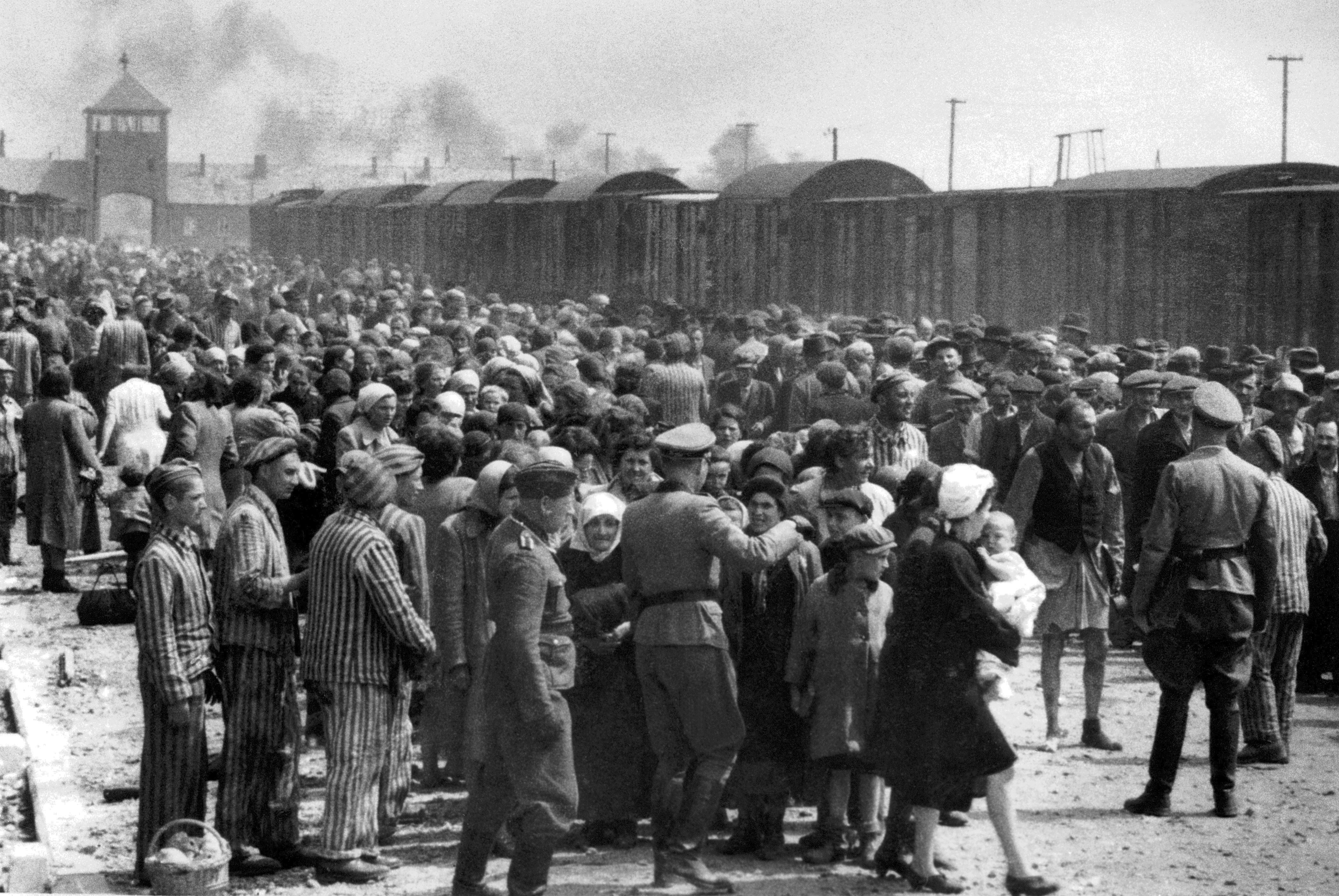
- Jews arriving at Auschwitz II in German-occupied Poland, May 1944. Most were selected for execution in gas chambers.
- Location: Europe, primarily German-occupied Poland and the Soviet Union
- Date: 1941–1945
- Attack type: Genocide, ethnic cleansing, mass murder, mass shooting, death marches, poison gas, hate crime, slavery
- Deaths: Around 6 million Jews (Note: Scholarly estimates fall in a range between 5.7 million and 6.2 million)
- Perpetrators: Nazi Germany along with its collaborators and allies: Schutzstaffel; Einsatzgruppen; Wehrmacht

The following outline is provided as an overview of and topical guide to Wikipedia articles about the Holocaust. (Note: This outline covers the persecution and systematic murder of Jews and other targeted groups by Nazi Germany before and during World War II.)

The Holocaust, known in Hebrew as the Shoah, was the genocide of European Jews during World War II. From 1941 to 1945, Nazi Germany and its collaborators systematically murdered around six million Jews across German-occupied Europe, approximately two-thirds of Europe's Jewish population. The murders were committed primarily through mass shootings across Eastern Europe and poison gas chambers in extermination camps, chiefly Auschwitz-Birkenau, Treblinka, Belzec, Sobibor, Chełmno and Majdanek death camps in occupied Poland.

Concurrent Nazi persecutions killed millions of other non-Jewish civilians and prisoners of war (POWs); the term Holocaust is sometimes used to include the murder and persecution of non-Jewish groups, such as the Romani and Soviet POWs. The Nazi regime also persecuted and killed millions of other people, among them disabled people, Poles, homosexual men and Jehovah's Witnesses.

== Main articles ==
- The Holocaust
- Bibliography of the Holocaust
- Timeline of the Holocaust
- Nazi Germany
- Aktion T4
- Nazi eugenics
- Final Solution
- Nazi concentration camps
- Extermination camp
- Romani Holocaust
- Aftermath of the Holocaust
- Nuremberg trials
- Responsibility for the Holocaust
- Evidence and documentation for the Holocaust
- Holocaust denial
- Holocaust studies
- Holocaust survivors
- International response to the Holocaust
- Jewish ghettos established by Nazi Germany
- Jewish resistance in German-occupied Europe
- Persecution of Jews
- Racial policy of Nazi Germany
- Rescue of Jews during the Holocaust
- Righteous Among the Nations
- Victims of Nazi Germany

== Antisemitism ==
- Half-Jew
- Jewish question
- Jewish war conspiracy theory
- Judenfrei
- Racial policy of Nazi Germany
- Rassenschande

== Planning ==
- Final Solution
- Generalplan Ost
- Hitler's prophecy
- Hunger Plan
- Madagascar Plan
- Nisko Plan
- Wannsee Conference

== Organizations ==
=== German organizations ===
- 1st SS Infantry Brigade
- 2nd SS Infantry Brigade
- Befehlshaber der Sicherheitspolizei und des SD
- Concentration Camps Inspectorate
- Deutsche Wirtschaftsbetriebe
- Einsatzgruppen
- German Earth and Stone Works
- Germanic SS
- Gestapo
- Inspekteur der Sicherheitspolizei und des SD
- Kommandostab Reichsführer-SS
- Nazi Germany
- Nazi Party
- Order Police battalions
- Ordnungspolizei
- Reich Security Main Office
- Reich Security Main Office Referat IV B4
- Reserve Police Battalion 101
- Schutzstaffel
- Sicherheitsdienst
- Sipo-SD Academy
- SS Cavalry Brigade
- SS Main Economic and Administrative Office
- SS-Totenkopfverbände
- Waffen-SS
- War crimes of the Wehrmacht

=== Collaborators ===
- Arajs Kommando
- Collaboration with Nazi Germany and Fascist Italy
- Lithuanian Security Police
- Rollkommando Hamann
- Special Brigades
- Trawniki men
- Ukrainian Auxiliary Police
- Ypatingasis būrys

=== Jewish councils and police ===
- Jewish Ghetto Police
- Judenrat
- Reich Association of Jews in Germany
- Ústredňa Židov

=== Companies ===
- Deutsche Reichsbahn
- IG Farben
- List of companies involved in the Holocaust
- Topf and Sons

== Victims ==
- German atrocities committed against Soviet prisoners of war
- German camp brothels in World War II
- Hidden children during the Holocaust
- Intelligenzaktion
- Intermarried Jews in the Holocaust
- Jews outside Europe under Axis occupation
- List of villages and towns depopulated of Jews during the Holocaust
- Nazi persecution of the Catholic Church in Germany
- Persecution of homosexual men in Nazi Germany
- Persecution of Jehovah's Witnesses in Nazi Germany
- Persecution of Jews
- Polish prisoners in Nazi concentration camps
- Romani Holocaust
- Sexuality and the Holocaust
- Victims of Nazi Germany
- Yugoslav prisoners in Nazi concentration camps

== Persecution ==
=== Early persecution ===
- Early camps
- Emigration of Jews from Nazi Germany and German-occupied Europe
- Haavara Agreement
- Kristallnacht
- Malicious Practices Act 1933
- Nuremberg Laws

=== Badges ===
- Black triangle (badge)
- Identification of inmates in Nazi concentration camps
- Nazi concentration camp badge
- P (Nazi symbol)
- Pink triangle
- Purple triangle
- Red triangle (badge)
- Yellow badge

=== Deportations ===
- Holocaust trains
- Marseille roundup
- Roundup (police action)
- Vel' d'Hiv roundup

== Plunder and forced labor ==
- Extermination through labour
- Forced labor in Nazi concentration camps
- Hungarian Gold Train
- Kanada warehouses, Auschwitz
- M-Aktion
- Nazi dental gold

== Killing ==
=== Massacres ===
- 1941 Odessa massacre
- 1941 pogroms in eastern Poland
- 1941 pogroms in Lithuania
- Babi Yar
- Bandenbekämpfung
- Dorohoi pogrom
- Iași pogrom
- Jedwabne pogrom
- Kamianets-Podilskyi massacre
- Kaunas pogrom
- Kraljevo massacre
- Legionnaires' rebellion and Bucharest pogrom
- Lviv pogroms (1941)
- Ninth Fort
- Operation Harvest Festival
- Piaśnica massacres
- Ponary massacre
- Rumbula massacre

=== Medical killing ===
- Action 14f13
- Aktion Brandt
- Aktion T4
- Memorandum Authorizing Involuntary Euthanasia
- Nazi eugenics
- Nazi human experimentation

=== Methods of killing ===
- Crematorium
- Gas chamber
- Gas van
- Sonderkommando
- Zyklon B

=== Camp system ===
- Death marches during the Holocaust
- Extermination camp
- List of subcamps of Auschwitz
- Nacht und Nebel
- Nazi concentration camps
- Operation Reinhard
- Sonder- und Ehrenhaft
- Subcamp

=== Camp terminology ===
- Appellplatz
- Arbeit macht frei
- Jedem das Seine
- Jourhaus
- Language of Nazi concentration camps
- Muselmann
- Revier (Nazi concentration camps)

=== Guards and functionaries ===
- Disciplinary and Penal Code
- Female guards in Nazi concentration camps
- Kapo
- Lagerführer
- Luftwaffe guards at concentration camps
- Nazi concentration camp commandant
- Politische Abteilung
- Postenpflicht
- Prisoner functionaries
- Strafkompanie

== Locations ==
=== Ghettos ===
- Będzin Ghetto
- Białystok Ghetto
- Brzesko Ghetto
- Budapest Ghetto
- Drohobycz Ghetto
- Dzyatlava Ghetto
- Jewish ghettos established by Nazi Germany
- Kovno Ghetto
- Kraków Ghetto
- List of Jewish ghettos in Europe during World War II
- List of Jewish ghettos in German-occupied Poland
- Łódź Ghetto
- Lublin Ghetto
- Lwów Ghetto
- Minsk Ghetto
- Mizoch Ghetto
- Radom Ghetto
- Riga Ghetto
- Sambor Ghetto
- Theresienstadt Ghetto
- Vilna Ghetto
- Warsaw Ghetto

=== Concentration camps ===
- Arbeitsdorf concentration camp
- Bergen-Belsen concentration camp
- Bogdanovka concentration camp
- Buchenwald concentration camp
- Dachau concentration camp
- Ebensee concentration camp
- Flossenbürg concentration camp
- Gross-Rosen concentration camp
- Grosulovo internment camp
- Gusen concentration camp
- Herzogenbusch concentration camp
- Hinzert concentration camp
- Janowska concentration camp
- Kaiserwald concentration camp
- Kauen concentration camp
- Kraków-Płaszów concentration camp
- Maly Trostenets concentration camp
- Mauthausen concentration camp
- Mittelbau-Dora concentration camp
- Natzweiler-Struthof concentration camp
- Neuengamme concentration camp
- Niederhagen concentration camp
- Ozarichi concentration camp
- Pechora concentration camp
- Poniatowa concentration camp
- Ravensbrück concentration camp
- Risiera di San Sabba
- Šabac concentration camp
- Sachsenhausen concentration camp
- Sereď concentration camp
- Stutthof concentration camp
- Syrets concentration camp
- Trawniki concentration camp
- Vaivara concentration camp
- Vapniarka concentration camp
- Warsaw concentration camp

=== Extermination camps ===
- Auschwitz concentration camp
- Belzec extermination camp
- Chełmno extermination camp
- Majdanek concentration camp
- Sobibor extermination camp
- Treblinka extermination camp

=== Transit camps ===
- Bolzano Transit Camp
- Drancy internment camp
- Kamp Amersfoort
- Kamp Schoorl
- Mechelen transit camp
- Westerbork transit camp

=== Internment camps ===
- Ånebyleiren
- Fort Breendonk
- Gurs internment camp
- Internment camps in France
- List of Italian concentration camps

=== Other ===
- Wannsee

== People ==
=== Nazi leadership and senior SS, police and state officials ===
- Erich von dem Bach-Zelewski
- Martin Bormann
- Josef Bühler
- Kurt Daluege
- Oskar Dirlewanger
- Adolf Eichmann
- Theodor Eicke
- Hans Frank
- Wilhelm Frick
- Albert Ganzenmüller
- Odilo Globocnik
- Richard Glücks
- Joseph Goebbels
- Hermann Göring
- Reinhard Heydrich
- Heinrich Himmler
- Adolf Hitler
- Hermann Höfle
- Friedrich Jeckeln
- Ernst Kaltenbrunner
- Hans Kammler
- Fritz Katzmann
- Wilhelm Koppe
- Friedrich-Wilhelm Krüger
- Heinrich Müller (Gestapo)
- Oswald Pohl
- Hans-Adolf Prützmann
- Arthur Seyss-Inquart
- Albert Speer
- Bruno Streckenbach
- Julius Streicher
- Jürgen Stroop
- Karl Wolff

=== Einsatzgruppen and mobile killing operations ===
- Paul Blobel
- Werner Braune
- Karl Jäger
- Rudolf Lange
- Bruno Müller
- Erich Naumann
- Arthur Nebe
- Otto Ohlendorf
- Otto Rasch
- Walter Rauff
- Franz Walter Stahlecker
- Eduard Strauch

=== Camp commandants and senior camp staff ===
- Hans Aumeier
- Richard Baer
- Hans Bothmann
- Anton Burger
- Irmfried Eberl
- Kurt Franz
- Amon Göth
- Gottlieb Hering
- Rudolf Höss
- Karl-Otto Koch
- Max Koegel
- Josef Kramer
- Herbert Lange
- Arthur Liebehenschel
- Maria Mandl
- Max Pauly
- Hermann Pister
- Karl Rahm
- Franz Reichleitner
- Siegfried Seidl
- Franz Stangl
- Karl Streibel
- Fritz Suhren
- Christian Wirth
- Franz Ziereis

=== Medical and "euthanasia" programme personnel ===
- Philipp Bouhler
- Viktor Brack
- Karl Brandt
- Karl Gebhardt
- Ernst-Robert Grawitz
- Werner Heyde
- Enno Lolling
- Josef Mengele
- Paul Nitsche
- Eduard Wirths

=== Occupation, ghetto and deportation administration ===
- Hans Biebow
- Alois Brunner
- Theodor Dannecker
- Otto-Heinrich Drechsler
- Ludwig Fischer
- Albert Forster
- Ferdinand aus der Fünten
- Arthur Greiser
- Wilhelm Harster
- Helmut Knochen
- Erich Koch
- Kurt Lischka
- Hinrich Lohse
- Franz Murer
- Franz Novak
- Carl Oberg
- Hanns Albin Rauter
- Josef Terboven
- Edmund Veesenmayer
- Otto Wächter

== By country ==
- The Holocaust in Albania
- The Holocaust in Austria
- The Holocaust in Belarus
- The Holocaust in Belgium
- The Holocaust in Bohemia and Moravia
- The Holocaust in Bulgaria
- The Holocaust in Bulgarian-occupied Greece
- The Holocaust in Estonia
- The Holocaust in France
- The Holocaust in German-occupied Serbia
- The Holocaust in Germany
- The Holocaust in Greece
- The Holocaust in Hungary
- The Holocaust in Italy
- The Holocaust in Latvia
- The Holocaust in Libya
- The Holocaust in Lithuania
- The Holocaust in Luxembourg
- The Holocaust in North Macedonia
- The Holocaust in Norway
- The Holocaust in Poland
- The Holocaust in Romania
- The Holocaust in Russia
- The Holocaust in Slovakia
- The Holocaust in the Independent State of Croatia
- The Holocaust in the Netherlands
- The Holocaust in the Soviet Union
- The Holocaust in the Sudetenland
- The Holocaust in Ukraine
- Transnistria Governorate

== Resistance ==
- Aid and Rescue Committee
- Attack on the twentieth convoy
- Auschwitz Sonderkommando revolt
- Białystok Ghetto uprising
- Bielski partisans
- Częstochowa Ghetto uprising
- Ghetto uprisings
- Jewish partisans
- Jewish resistance in German-occupied Europe
- Kastner train
- Operation Atlas
- Sobibor uprising
- Warsaw Ghetto Uprising
- Working Group (resistance organization)
- Żegota

== Rescue ==
- Arab and Muslim rescue efforts during the Holocaust
- Courage to Care
- Izieu
- Kindertransport
- Le Chambon-sur-Lignon
- List of Polish Righteous Among the Nations
- Priest's Grotto
- Rescue of Jews by Catholics during the Holocaust
- Rescue of Jews by Poles during the Holocaust
- Rescue of Jews during the Holocaust
- Rescue of the Danish Jews
- Righteous Among the Nations

== Responses ==
- International response to the Holocaust
- Japan and the Holocaust
- Knowledge of the Holocaust in Nazi Germany and German-occupied Europe
- Philippines and the Holocaust
- Pope Pius XII and the Holocaust
- Portugal and the Holocaust
- Relations between Nazi Germany and the Arab world
- Spain and the Holocaust
- Sweden and the Holocaust
- Turkey and the Holocaust
- United States and the Holocaust

== Aftermath ==
=== Trials ===
- Eichmann trial
- Nazi hunting
- Nazis and Nazi Collaborators (Punishment) Law
- Nuremberg Code
- Nuremberg trials

=== Survivors ===
- Aftermath of the Holocaust
- Anti-Jewish violence in Central and Eastern Europe, 1944–1946
- Bricha
- Holocaust survivors
- Nakam
- Sh'erit ha-Pletah

=== Restitution ===
- Holocaust Expropriated Art Recovery Act of 2016
- List of claims for restitution for Nazi-looted art
- Reparations Agreement between Israel and the Federal Republic of Germany

== Historiography and memory ==
=== Historiography ===
- Armenian genocide and the Holocaust
- Functionalism–intentionalism debate
- Herero and Nama genocide and the Holocaust
- Holocaust studies
- Holocaust theology
- Holocaust uniqueness debate
- Khurbn
- Responsibility for the Holocaust

=== Education ===
- Genocide education
- Holocaust education
- Laws requiring teaching of the Holocaust

=== Memorials ===
- Every Person Has a Name
- The Holocaust Memorial Park
- Holocaust tourism
- List of Holocaust memorial days
- List of Holocaust memorials and museums
- Never again
- Ohel Yizkor
- Yad Vashem
- Yizkor books

=== Denial ===
- Holocaust denial
- Holocaust trivialization

=== Documentation ===
- Auschwitz Album
- Bibliography of the Holocaust
- Cookbooks of the Holocaust
- Der Ort des Terrors
- Encyclopedia of Camps and Ghettos, 1933–1945
- Evidence and documentation for the Holocaust
- German Concentration Camps Factual Survey
- Höcker Album
- KL – A History of the Nazi Concentration Camps
- List of Holocaust films
- List of Holocaust survivors
- List of major perpetrators of the Holocaust
- Nazi Concentration Camps (film)
- Photography of the Holocaust
- Sobibor perpetrator album
- Sonderkommando photographs
- Timeline of the Holocaust
- Westerbork film

== Bibliography ==
- Arad, Y. (1987). Belzec, Sobibor, Treblinka: The Operation Reinhard death camps. Indiana University Press.
- Arad, Y. (2009). Holocaust in the Soviet Union. University of Nebraska Press.
- Braham, R. L. (1981). The politics of genocide: The Holocaust in Hungary (Vols. 1–2). Columbia University Press.
- Breitman, R., & Lichtman, A. J. (2013). FDR and the Jews. Belknap Press of Harvard University Press.
- Evans, R. J. (2004). The coming of the Third Reich. Penguin Press.
- Evans, R. J. (2005). The Third Reich in power, 1933–1939. Penguin Press.
- Evans, R. J. (2009). The Third Reich at war, 1939–1945. Penguin Press.
- Friedlander, H. (1995). The origins of Nazi genocide: From euthanasia to the final solution. University of North Carolina Press.
- Friedländer, S. (2007). The years of extermination: Nazi Germany and the Jews, 1939–1945. HarperCollins.
- Gerwarth, R. (2011). Hitler's hangman: The life of Heydrich. Yale University Press.
- Grabowski, J. (2013). Hunt for the Jews: Betrayal and murder in German-occupied Poland. Indiana University Press.
- Hilberg, R. (2003). The destruction of the European Jews (3rd ed.). Yale University Press.
- Ioanid, R. (2000). The Holocaust in Romania: The destruction of Jews and Gypsies under the Antonescu regime, 1940–1944. Ivan R. Dee.
- Kay, A. J. (2006). Exploitation, resettlement, mass murder: Political and economic planning for German occupation policy in the Soviet Union, 1940–1941. Berghahn Books.
- Kay, A. J. (2021). Empire of destruction: A history of Nazi mass killing. Yale University Press.
- Kershaw, I. (2008). Hitler: A biography. W. W. Norton.
- Lewy, G. (2000). The Nazi persecution of the Gypsies. Oxford University Press.
- Lidegaard, B. (2013). Countrymen. Knopf.
- Longerich, P. (2010). Holocaust: The Nazi persecution and murder of the Jews. Oxford University Press.
- Longerich, P. (2012). Heinrich Himmler: A life (J. Noakes & L. Sharpe, Trans.). Oxford University Press.
- Marrus, M. R., & Paxton, R. O. (1996). Vichy France and the Jews. Stanford University Press.
- Michman, D. (Ed.). (1998). Belgium and the Holocaust: Jews, Belgians, Germans. Yad Vashem.
- Moore, B. (1997). Victims and survivors: The Nazi persecution of the Jews in the Netherlands, 1940–1945. Arnold.
- Penton, J. (2004). Jehovah's Witnesses and the Third Reich: Sectarian politics under persecution. University of Toronto Press.
- Phayer, M. (2000). The Catholic Church and the Holocaust, 1930–1965. Indiana University Press.
- Ragaru, N. (2023). Bulgaria, the Jews, and the Holocaust: On the origins of a heroic narrative. Boydell & Brewer.
- Sarfatti, M. (2006). The Jews in Mussolini's Italy: From equality to persecution. University of Wisconsin Press.
- Wachsmann, N. (2015). KL: A history of the Nazi concentration camps. Farrar, Straus and Giroux.
- Whisnant, C. J. (2016). Queer identities and politics in Germany: A history, 1880–1945. Harrington Park Press.

== See also ==
- Genocide
- Crimes against humanity
- Outline of Genocide studies
- Outline of the Armenian genocide
- Outline of the Cambodian genocide
- Outline of the Holocaust
- Outline of the Holodomor
- Outline of World War II
- World War II
