= Kommando =

General term for special police and military forces

A Kommando (German: [kɔˈmando], lit. "unit" or "command") is a general term for special police and military forces in German, Dutch, and Afrikaans speaking nations.

It was also the term in the World War II era Luftwaffe for special units used to test new aircraft for combat readiness (as Erprobungskommando units) and examples existed that only used the "Kommando" name, such as the Luftwaffe Gruppe-sized Kommando Nowotny. In the winter/spring 1945 period, single-plane Kommando-designated units that used the Arado Ar 234 Blitz jet powered reconnaissance-bomber operated from hidden, forest-lined runways in eastern Germany.

Before and during World War II, the basic unit of organization of forced labourers in Nazi concentration camps, equivalent to a detail or detachment were referred to as Kommandos.

Among the most notable of such units were the Sonderkommandos (lit. 'Special Kommandos'), carrying out the Final Solution by guarding the newly arrived inmates, escorting them to gas chambers, searching the bodies and burning them. Außenkommandos were external work details that were set up, either leaving from the concentration camp or from outside the camp boundary.

In Auschwitz: A Doctor's Eyewitness Account, concentration camp survivor Dr. Miklós Nyiszli (who served on Dr. Josef Mengele's medical kommando) describes the "tooth-pulling kommando". These teams of eight, all "fine stomatologists and dental surgeons" equipped "in one hand with a lever, and in the other a pair of pliers for extracting teeth", worked in the crematoria. Stationed in front of the ovens, their job was to pry open the mouths of prisoners who had been gassed and extract, or break off, "all gold teeth, as well as any gold bridgework and fillings".

Other kommandos depended on the job they were assigned to, such as woodcutting kommandos, factory kommandos or kitchen kommandos.

== See also ==
- Subcamp (SS)
- Luftwaffe

== See also ==
- Commando
- Kapo
- Language of Nazi concentration camps
