= Sweden and the Holocaust =

Sweden's relationship to the Holocaust in World War II

Sweden was a neutral state during World War II and was not directly involved in the Holocaust in German-occupied Europe. Nonetheless, the Swedish government maintained important economic links with Nazi Germany and there was widespread awareness within the country of its policy of persecution and, from 1942, mass extermination of Jews.

Before the war, antisemitism did not become a mainstream political issue and Swedes were broadly critical of the violence of Nazi policy. In spite of this, the country continued to tighten its immigration laws and admitted few Jewish refugees from Nazi persecution. As part of the official policy of neutrality, Sweden maintained ties with Nazi Germany throughout the Second World War. Swedish diplomats were aware of the extermination of Jews as early as January 1942 but took no action. In the following months, news of the extermination was reported in detail by Swedish newspapers.

Swedish official attitudes towards the issue began to change in the aftermath of the arrest and deportation of Jews in German-occupied Norway. In the final years of the war, it provided official support for attempts to rescue Jews in German-occupied Denmark and Hungary which served to consolidate the self-image of Sweden as a "humanitarian superpower" in post-war Europe.

== Background ==
=== Jews and antisemitism in Sweden ===
The Jewish population in Sweden started small; however, it had grown rapidly in the aftermath of World War I as a result of Jewish emigration from Eastern Europe. A number of small antisemitic political groups and parties operated in the country, including the National Socialist Workers' Party (Nationalsocialistiska Arbetarepartiet) which emerged in 1933. John Gilmour writes "in its anti-semitic characteristics Sweden in the 1930s was in step with most other main-stream, democratic European societies". Although discrimination and violence against Jews after the seizure of power by the Nazi Party in Germany in 1933 was widely known in Sweden, he stated that Swedish attitudes towards Jews were bound up with Sweden's own traditions and social history:

As a society, it remained stratified by class, hobbled by deference, rigid with formality and xenophobic, particularly towards Jews. Although in its anti-Semitism Sweden was firmly in the mainstream European tradition, Swedes largely rejected extremist Nazi policies and brutality. Yet, the combination of interest in racial categorisation and narrow nationalism coupled with a tradition of national self-preoccupation meant that most failed to appreciate the urgency of the pre-war plight of Jewish refugees. Many Swedes were only one generation away from grinding poverty, disease and malnutrition, both urban and rural. Not surprisingly, their first concern was for their own economic welfare.

Sweden introduced controls on immigration for the first time in 1927 and subsequently tightened them further in 1938. This was motivated by "fear of large, uncontrolled streams of refugees", particularly Eastern Europeans and Jews. Around 3,000 Jewish refugees from Germany arrived in Sweden in 1939. Students at the University of Uppsala the same year protested against the admission of a small number of Jewish refugee doctors. However, the official refusal to accept larger numbers of refugees was criticized by a minority of Swedes notably including the newspaper Göteborgs Handels- och Sjöfartstidning and the humanitarian activist Natanael Beskow.

=== Neutrality and World War II ===
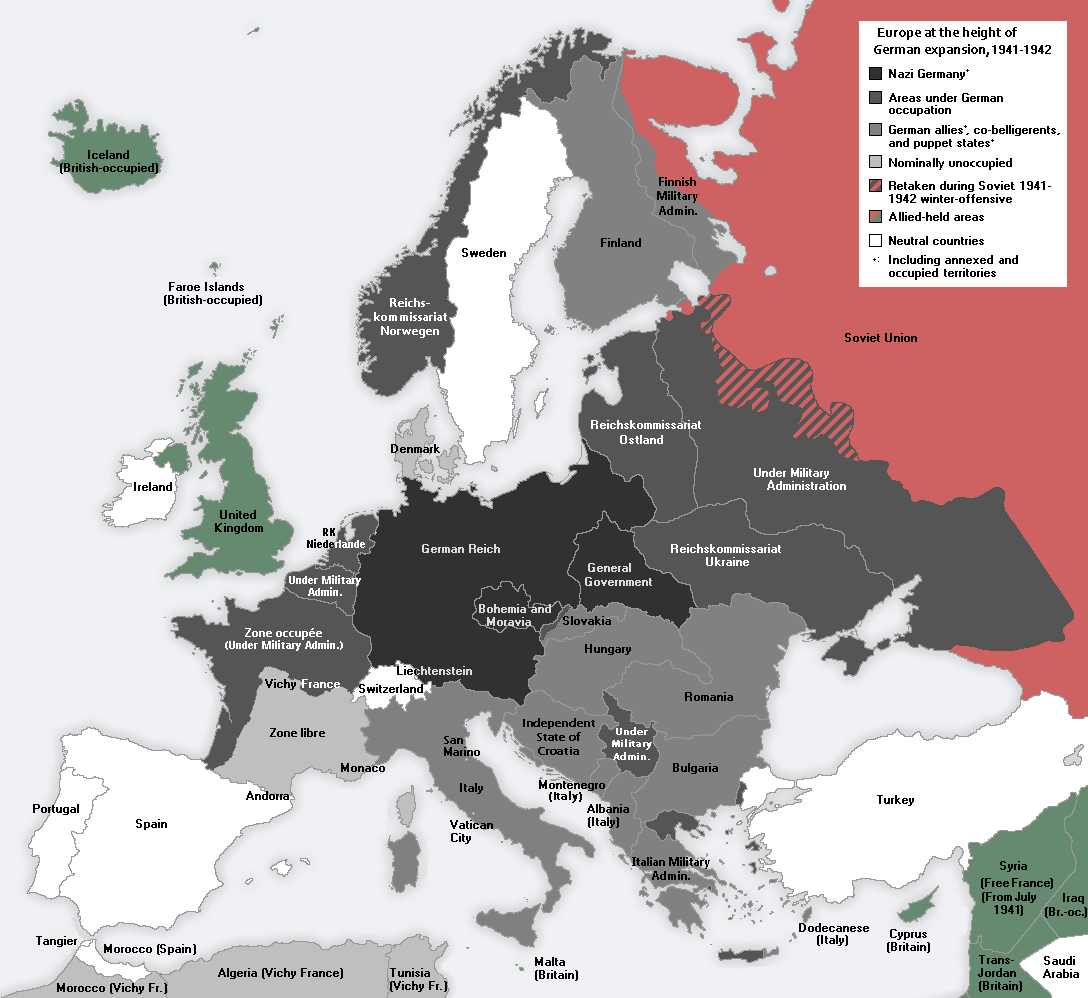
Sweden shown on a map of German-occupied Europe, c.1942

Sweden had been neutral state since 1814 and was governed by a coalition of all the major parties. After the outbreak of World War II in 1939, it attempted to cultivate economic relations with both Nazi Germany and the United Kingdom with the particular aim of securing its own food supplies. German forces invaded and occupied Norway and Denmark in April 1940 while Finland entered into a de facto alliance with Nazi Germany from 1941. During the war, Sweden exported iron ore used in the German war industries and maintained a trade policy which primarily favoured Nazi Germany and German-occupied Europe. Åmark notes that "Germany evidently got what it mostly needed from Sweden" and never seriously considered mounting an invasion. Controversially, the Swedish government also allowed German soldiers on leave to travel through its territory from German-occupied Norway before the practice was finally stopped in August 1943. It was only in November 1944 that Sweden, under significant pressure from the Allies, ceased trading with Nazi Germany.

Åmark writes that "neutrality was not only the official policy of the government during the war, it was also the recommended attitude for Swedish citizens. A Swede should sit down in the boat, and not engage himself or herself in public demonstrations for or against any of the states at war." In order to maintain its neutrality, national newspapers was censored and the government "really tried to suppress information on Nazi German brutality in general and on persecution of Jews and the Holocaust". Nonetheless, there was some sympathy for Nazi war aims and anti-communism as well as Nazi racial theories which overlapped with the Nordicism. Several hundred Swedish nationals volunteered to serve in the Waffen-SS and some were reported to have served as guards at Treblinka extermination camp.

== The Holocaust ==
The German invasion of the Soviet Union in June 1941 marked an intensification in Nazi persecution of Jews. Mass killings soon began within occupied territories in the Soviet Union. The decision to begin the rounding up and deportation of Jews from other parts of German-occupied Europe for extermination had been taken by January 1942. In Sweden, the Ministry for Foreign Affairs received news about the policy of extermination. In a chance discussion in a train, the Swedish diplomat Göran von Otter was told of the extermination of Jews at Belzec extermination camp by an SS officer in August 1942. He reported the information to the Ministry in the hope that it would publicly condemn the atrocities, although no action was taken. Even so, Paul A. Levine writes that "Swedish officials, and in fact much of the newspaper-reading public, had as much or more information about many details of the 'Final Solution' than their counterparts in other neutral or Allied countries".

Although Swedish newspapers had reported on Nazi concentration camps since 1933, their coverage on the escalating persecution of Jews was uneven. Provincial conservative newspapers, in particular, published little on the subject until the Allied liberation of the camps in 1945. In spite of this, the Swedish press began to publish detailed accounts of the extermination of Jews in German-occupied Europe as early as the autumn of 1942 and Jewish newspapers such as Judisk Krönika and Judisk Tidskrif published regular reports on the subject.

The authorities in German-occupied Norway began a series of operations in October 1942 to round up the country's small Jewish population, estimated at around 2,000. The news was reported in the Swedish press but the Ministry for Foreign Affairs was "rather slow to realise what was going on". Most Norwegian Jews were detained in the first operations but the Norwegian resistance did succeed in smuggling some Jewish refugees across the border into Sweden in the so-called Carl Fredriksens Transport. In this way, it is thought that up to 1,100 may have been saved.

Although Sweden became increasingly conscious of the Holocaust and involved in officially-sanctioned rescue attempts in the later years of the war, Paul A. Levine notes that "Sweden's government and people responded with a distressing lack of generosity towards those few Jews who needed help and were in a situation where Swedish help - both in the 1930s and early 1940s - might have made a difference". However, he noted that "some Swedish officials, in contrast to their counterparts in other liberal democracies, chose increasingly often to engage in direct efforts to save Jews. Where they had earlier stood indifferent to the plight of some few Jews, they came to understand that their previous response had been inadequate. Crucially, these mostly mid-level officials were supported by their political superiors."

In total, 10 Swedes have been recognised as Righteous Among the Nations by the Israeli institute Yad Vashem.

== State-backed rescue efforts ==
=== Denmark, September–November 1943 ===
Denmark had been invaded by Germany in April 1940 but had subsequently been able to retain a higher degree of internal autonomy than many other parts of German-occupied Europe until a political crisis in August 1943. In its aftermath, German plans to detain Denmark's small Jewish population were leaked to the Danish resistance in September 1943. After receiving approval from the Swedish government, it successfully evacuated 8,000 Danish Jews to Sweden in October and November 1943.

=== Hungary, July–December 1944 ===
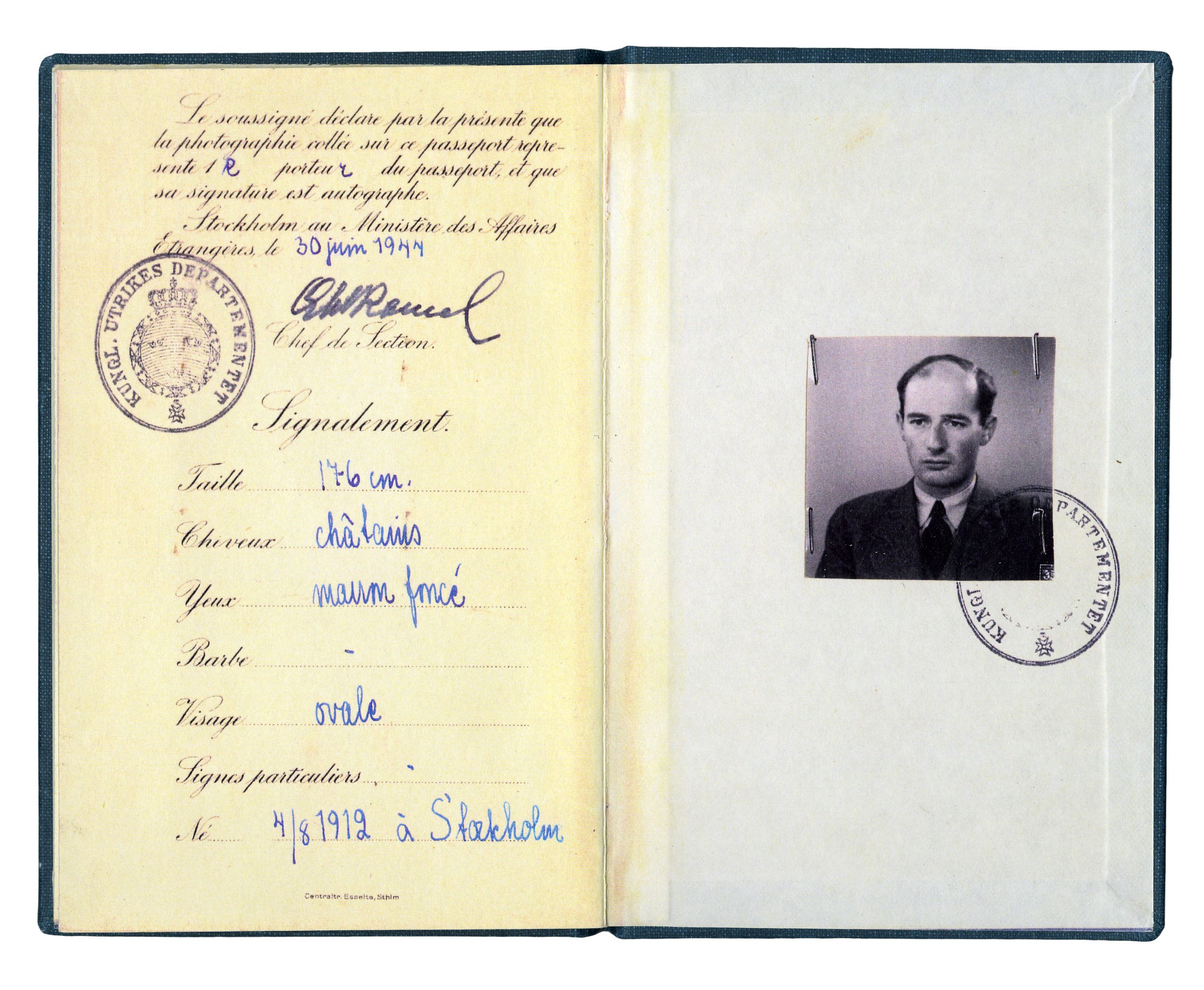
Raoul Wallenberg's Swedish diplomatic passport with which he was dispatched to Hungary in July 1944

Hungary was an early ally of Nazi Germany but, as an independent state, maintained a significant degree of autonomy over its internal affairs including the treatment of its significant Jewish population. However, it was invaded by German forces in March 1944 once it became known that the Hungarian regime had attempted to open secret negotiations with the Allies and the Germans rapidly implemented plans to exterminate its Jews. At the request of the recently established War Refugee Board (WRB), the United States government had issued a request to neutral powers to expand their diplomatic legations in Hungary in May 1944 in the hope that a large number of foreign observers might encourage the new regime to moderate its policy ahead of the advance of Soviet forces on the Eastern Front. Although he was not a career diplomat, Raoul Wallenberg was selected for the mission to Budapest in June 1944. It was funded and co-ordinated by the WRB rather than the Swedish government.

Wallenberg arrived in July 1944. He was authorised to issue various forms of protective passes to Jews as the legation had already been doing on a small-scale on its own initiative. He ultimately issued several hundred visas and 10,000 protective passes with the aid of the Swedish chargé d'affaires in Budapest Per Anger. Similar initiatives were taken by individual Swiss and Spanish diplomats in Budapest at the same time. After encircling the city, Soviet forces captured Budapest in December 1944 and Wallenberg was detained and disappeared. It is generally considered that he died or was executed in Soviet captivity, perhaps in 1947. It was initially believed that Wallenberg's actions had saved as many as 100,000 Jews; more recent estimates put the number at 7,000 to 9,000.

== White Buses ==
It was widely seen as inevitable that the Allies would win the war by early 1945. Folke Bernadotte, Count of Wisborg, used his position as a diplomat and vice-president of the Swedish Red Cross to negotiate an agreement with the Germans under which concentration camp inmates in areas still under Nazi control would be collected and transported to Sweden. The initiative originated with the Norwegian diplomat Niels Christian Ditleff and was initially aimed at the rescue solely of inmates of Danish and Norwegian origin. 15,000 civilians, predominately Norwegian and Danish political prisoners, were evacuated by the Swedish Red Cross before May 1945. However, several hundred Danish Jews interned in the Theresienstadt Ghetto were also among those evacuated.

== Postwar representations ==
In the post-war years, the Swedish government placed emphasis on its humanitarian actions to save Jews as a means of deflecting criticism of its economic and political relations with Nazi Germany. Historian Ingrid Lomfors states that this "sowed the seed of the image of Sweden as a 'humanitarian superpower'" in post-war Europe and its prominent involvement in the United Nations. In its portrayal of the policy of neutrality and wartime humanitarian assistance, Levine argued that, in the post-war years:

Swedish students have been taught that rather than assist "one side" or the other in pursuing their sordid nationalistic goals (and in fact the vast majority of Swedes wished for an Allied victory), their leaders 'fought' for peace - higher, more noble ideals than the ones motivating the belligerents. As a result of this interpretation, Swedish memory of the war is suffused with a sometimes rather smug sense of moral superiority, yet crucially, one shadowed by a lingering sense of guilt at not having participated in the struggle against Nazism.

Holocaust studies remained marginal in academia in Sweden. It was reported in 1999 that only two studies had ever been published on the theme of Sweden and the Holocaust. It has been argued that this reflected the pervasive Folkhemmet ideology associated with Swedish Social Democracy which saw the past only as a source of moral instruction to a forward-looking national project based on social improvement. Levine, an American historian teaching at Uppsala University for much of his career, authored a number of influential studies on the subject and played an important role in the emergence of Holocaust education in Sweden.

Since the 1990s, the issue of praise or blame to attach to the country's response to the Holocaust has become a contentious political subject in Sweden. Substantial public discussion about the degree of Swedish awareness of the Holocaust took place in the aftermath of the publication of the novel Not Wanting To See (Att inte vilja se, 2014) by the author Jan Guillou which argued that few Swedes had been aware of the Holocaust before the Swedish press published accounts of the Allied liberation of Nazi concentration camps in 1945.

Göran Persson, a former Swedish Prime Minister, founded the International Holocaust Remembrance Alliance in 1998. In 2018, the Swedish government announced its intention to build a Holocaust museum intended to "focus on surviving Swedes and collect items, interviews and documents about their experiences". It also announced its intention to establish a "centre" devoted to Wallenberg. Although delayed, it was decided that the Swedish Holocaust Museum would be located in Stockholm rather than Malmö in which a high number of antisemitic incidents had recently been reported. It opened its doors to the public in 2023.

== See also ==
- International response to the Holocaust
- Spain and the Holocaust
- Turkey and the Holocaust
