= Paul A. Levine =

American–Swedish Holocaust and genocide historian (1956–2019)

Paul A. Levine (31 December 1956 – 28 October 2019) was an American–Swedish Holocaust and genocide historian, co-author of a widely used Swedish textbook on the subject.

== Education ==
Levine received a Doctor of Philosophy in history from Uppsala University in 1996.

== Career ==
He was a co-founder of Uppsala University's Hugo Valentin Centre for Holocaust & Genocide Studies, and the author of many publications on Holocaust history and memory. After receiving his doctorate in 1996 with the monograph From Indifference to Activism; Swedish Diplomacy and the Holocaust, 1938– 1944. Levine pursued his work in Uppsala, Sweden. His main preoccupation was writing and teaching about the Holocaust. Working on his book, Raoul Wallenberg and Swedish diplomacy in Budapest in 1944–1945, Levine helped to understand Raoul Wallenberg in his real context, destroying existing myths about the Swedish hero.

== Prizes and stipends received ==
- The Raoul Wallenberg Centennial Medal 2012 Awarded in Buenos Aires for my book—"Raoul Wallenberg in Budapest; Myth, History & Holocaust" (2010), by the Raoul Wallenberg International Foundation; Buenos Aires, November 2012. This prize was supported by the Swedish Embassy, Bueno Aires.
- Martin Henriksson Holmdahl, with Stéphane Bruchfeld, for service to Uppsala University and to Holocaust education and research in Sweden. Jan 2010.

== Publications ==
=== As single author ===
- Raoul Wallenberg in Budapest; Myth, History & Holocaust (Vallentine Mitchell, London, UK and Portland, US, 2010.
- From Indifference to Activism; Swedish Diplomacy and the Holocaust, 1938– 1944, (Acta Universitatis Upsaliensis, Studia Historica Upsaliensia), 1996. [In Sweden, doctoral dissertations are published.]

=== Co-author ===
- Om detta må ni berätta; en bok om Förintelsen i Europa 1933– 1945, 5th and revised edition, med ett nytt kapital om Sverige och Förintelsen, 2009, with Stéphane Bruchfeld
- Tell Ye Your Children with Stéphane Bruchfeld

=== Other publications ===
- Series: The Hugo Valentin Lectures, No.: 6 (VIII-IX), Series Editor: Paul A. Levine, Number of pages: 49 pp., Format: 130x205 mm, softback, published: May 2013, ISSN 1651-6265, ISBN 978-91-86531-09-6.
