= Intermarried Jews in the Holocaust =

Nazi Germany's treatment of Jews married to non-Jews during World War II

During the Holocaust, the German government was more lenient with Jews who were married to non-Jews. Generally, Jewish spouses in "privileged mixed marriages" were partially exempted from anti-Jewish legislation, and, until early 1945, were largely spared from being deported to ghettos, concentration camps, or extermination camps. The Nuremberg Laws, which forbade Germans from intermarrying with Jews, did not dissolve the marriages of existing German-Jewish couples, though they still came under immense pressure from the Nazi Party, which urged them to divorce in order to end the Jewish partner's legal protection. With a survival rate greatly exceeding that of other Jews, over 90% of intermarried Jews in Germany and German-occupied Europe were able to avoid being murdered by the Nazis during World War II.

== Effects ==
=== Ban on intermarriage ===
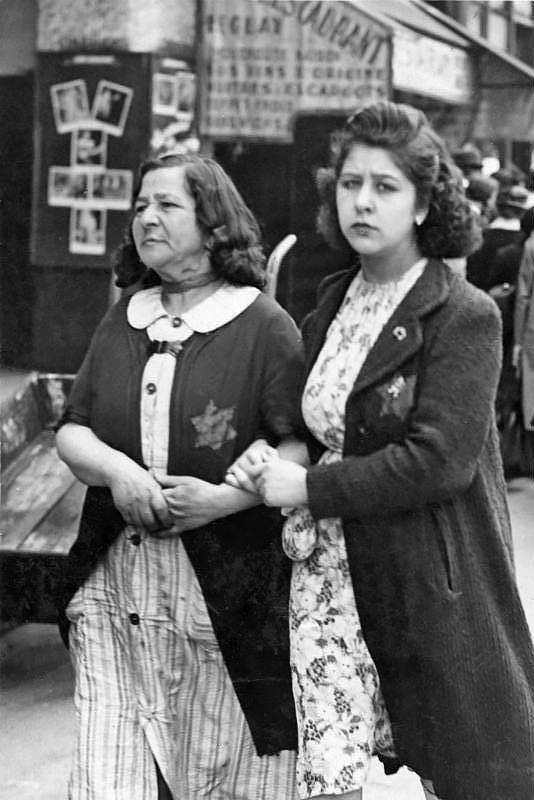
Among the advantages of living in a "privileged mixed marriage" was exemption from the requirement to wear a yellow star.

The 1935 Nuremberg Laws banned marriage between Jews and those of "German blood". Existing marriages were not dissolved. In the Protectorate of Bohemia and Moravia, marriages between Jews and Germans were banned upon the German invasion in March 1939, but it was possible for Jews and ethnic Czechs to marry until March 1942.

=== Exemptions ===
In Germany, marriages between a Jewish woman and a "German-blooded" man in which children were raised without Jewish faith were considered "privileged mixed marriages". Jewish women in such marriages received better rations than other Jews, and were exempted from a variety of Nazi decrees. Even "non-privileged mixed marriages" brought important privileges, such as the Jewish partner's right not to be deported.

With Adolf Hitler's approval, Hermann Goering established the privileged mixed marriages category in late December 1938. This category provided exemptions from certain persecution measures for families with gentile husbands and families with children raised as non-Jews due to their supposed closer ties to the German "Volksgemeinschaft". As a result, these families were spared from being ghettoized.

During the onset of World War II, female Jewish spouses in privileged mixed marriages were exempted from food restrictions and were not required to wear the yellow badge, which was mandatory for all Jews after September 1941. These exemptions were designed to provide a veneer of legitimacy to the Nazi regime's persecution of Jews and create a division within the Jewish community.

In the Netherlands, all intermarried couples were exempt from deportation until September 1942, at which point Jewish men without children were no longer exempt. The families had to register with the authorities to receive the exemption. In the Slovak State and the Independent State of Croatia, intermarried Jews were mostly exempt from deportation. Even if exemptions from deportation did not exist, Jews in mixed marriages often received help from non-Jewish relatives enabling them to hide and survive.

=== Other forms of persecution ===
Instead of being deported, many intermarried Jews in greater Germany were instead drafted into forced labor battalions with Organization Todt. During the 1943 Fabrikaktion, many intermarried German Jews were arrested. None of them were deported; some historians have argued that this outcome was the result of the Rosenstrasse protest. In 1943, those Jews whose marriages had ended were ordered to be deported by the Gestapo; as a result, in January 1944, some 1,000 Jews were deported to Theresienstadt Ghetto. Most of them perished after being transported to Auschwitz concentration camp. In January 1945, the exemption from deportation was revoked and many intermarried Jews were deported to Theresienstadt Ghetto. However, most of them survived the war.

In some cases, the Gestapo would arrest intermarried Jews or their non-Jewish spouses on fabricated charges, often as a pretext to steal their property.

=== Pressure to divorce ===
Intermarried families faced strong pressure to divorce, especially those in which the non-Jewish partner was female. The non-Jewish partner often faced loss of a job or property due to Aryanization. From the fall of 1944, many non-Jewish partners in mixed marriages were drafted for forced labor. In the Protectorate of Bohemia and Moravia, some Czech men married to Jewish women were sent to a forced labor camp and promised release if they agreed to divorce. In Greater Germany, the divorce rate has been estimated by historians between 7 and 10 percent.

== Statistics ==
In Amsterdam, intermarried Jews had a 59% lower risk of dying than those who were not intermarried. By September 1944, 98 percent of surviving German and Austrian Jews were in mixed marriages, according to official statistics. More than 90 percent of intermarried Jews from Greater Germany survived the war. Benjamin Frommer estimates that most intermarried Jews in Bohemia and Moravia survived the Nazi occupation, if they were not divorced or widowed.

== Aftermath ==
In the aftermath of the Holocaust, intermarried families contended with the attitudes of other Jews and Jewish organizations that disapproved of intermarriage.
