= Victor Klemperer =

German romance languages scholar and diarist

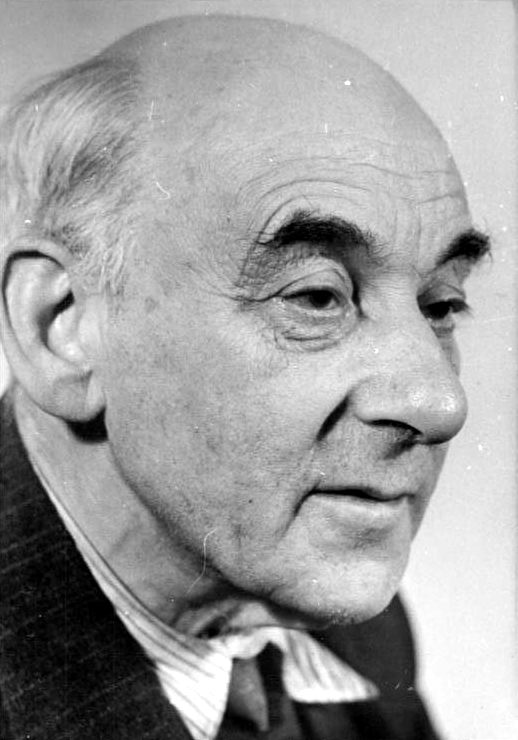
- Born: 9 October 1881; Landsberg an der Warthe, Kingdom of Prussia, German Empire (now Gorzów Wielkopolski, Poland)
- Died: 11 February 1960 (aged 78); Dresden, East Germany
- Education: Ludwig-Maximilians-Universität München (PhD, Hab)
- Occupation: Romanist
- Spouses: Eva Schlemmer (m. 1906; died 1951) Hadwig Kirchner (m. 1952)
- Parent(s): Wilhelm Klemperer; Henriette Klemperer née Frankel

Victor Klemperer (9 October 1881 – 11 February 1960) was a German philologist and diarist who chronicled life in the German Empire, the Weimar Republic, under Nazi Germany, and in East Germany. His detailed observations are among the most important firsthand accounts of everyday life under Nazism.

Dismissed from his university post as part of the racial policy of Nazi Germany, he survived persecution in Dresden, where he continued his diaries in secret. After 1945, he joined the Socialist Unity Party of Germany and later served as a cultural figure.

His diaries were published in 1995. In English translation, they are divided into three volumes: I Shall Bear Witness, To the Bitter End, and The Lesser Evil. The first two are standard sources on the Nazi era. His LTI – Lingua Tertii Imperii (Language of the Third Reich) shows how propaganda in Nazi Germany corrupted German language.

== Early life and education ==
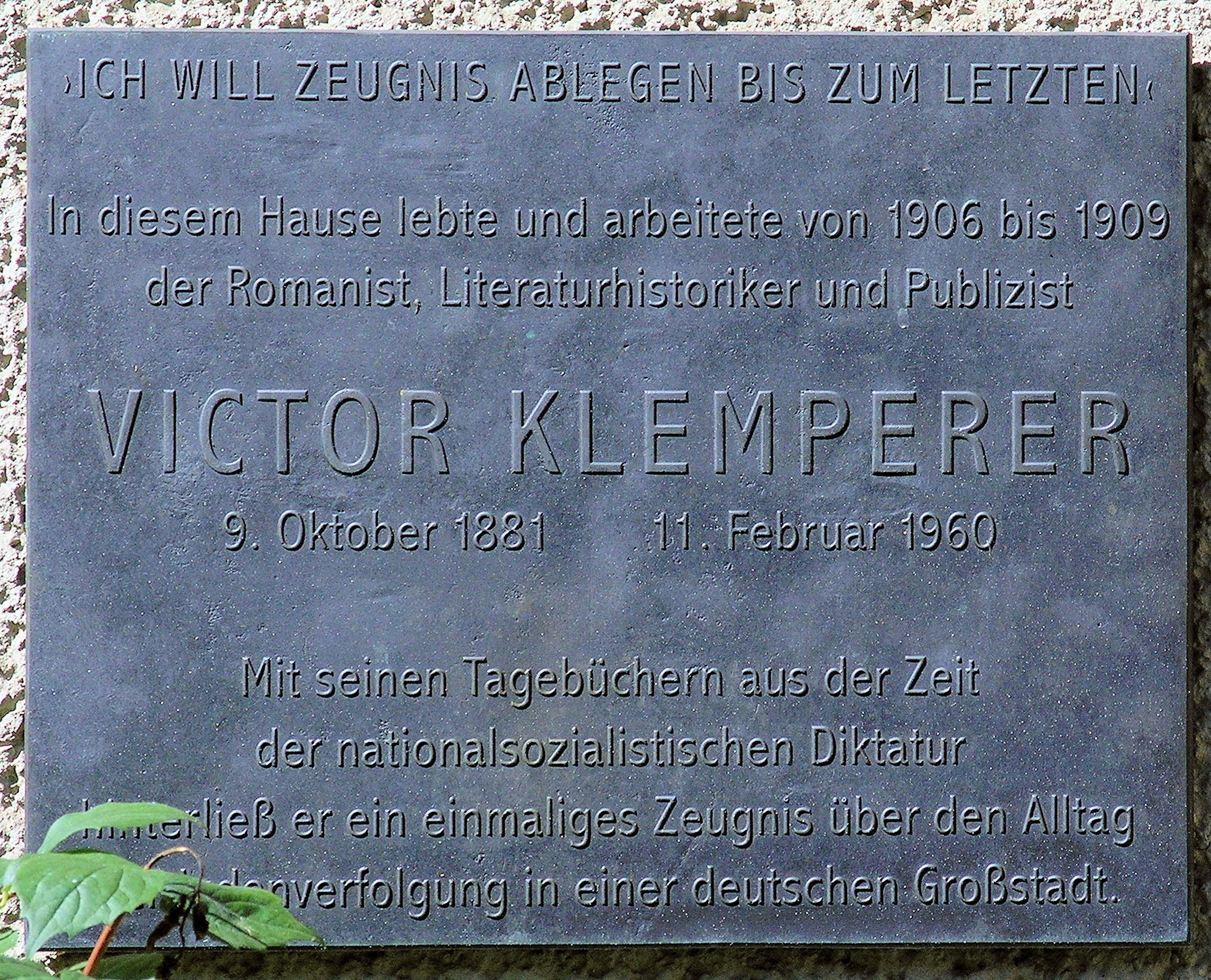
A plaque on Klemperer's former residence in Berlin-Wilmersdorf

Klemperer was born in Landsberg an der Warthe (now Gorzów Wielkopolski, Poland) as the youngest child of a Jewish family. His parents were Wilhelm Klemperer, a rabbi, and Henriette née Frankel. Victor had three brothers (Georg, Felix, Berhold) and four sisters (Margarete, Hedwig, Marta, Valeska). His oldest brothers were physicians: Georg, 1865–1946, director of the hospital Berlin-Moabit (which treated Vladimir Lenin); Felix, 1866–1932, director of the hospital Berlin-Reinickendorf.

Victor was a cousin of the conductor Otto Klemperer, and first cousin once removed to Otto's son, the actor Werner Klemperer. In 1903 Klemperer converted to Protestantism for the first time, shortly thereafter returning to Judaism.

Victor Klemperer attended several gymnasia. He was a student of philosophy, Romance and German studies at the Ludwig-Maximilians-Universität München, the University of Geneva, the University of Paris, and Friedrich Wilhelm University of Berlin from 1902 to 1905, and later worked as a journalist and writer in Berlin, until he resumed his studies in Munich from 1912.

Though not a religious man, Victor Klemperer needed a religious identity, as Jew, Christian or religious dissenter, to support his career in German academia of the time. He chose Christianity as being most compatible with his primary sense of identity as, simply, a German, and became baptised again in Berlin in 1912.

He completed his doctorate (on Montesquieu) in 1913.

== Career ==
Klemperer was habilitated under the supervision of Karl Vossler in 1914. From 1914 to 1915, he lectured at the University of Naples. He responded to the Italian entry into World War I by enlisting as a military volunteer in the Bavarian Army. From November 1915 to March 1916 he was deployed as an artilleryman on the Western Front in France. He was wounded and decorated for bravery by the Kingdom of Bavaria. After a recovery period in Germany, he served in the military censorship department of Prince Leopold of Bavaria's Ober Ost command in Kaunas and Leipzig.

He stayed in Munich from December 1918 to 1920, initially reporting for the national conservative and Pan-German Leipziger Neueste Nachrichten on the revolution in Bavaria (1918–1919) under the pseudonym Antibavaricus. He took a hostile attitude to both the People's State of Bavaria and the Bavarian Soviet Republic despite keeping company with some revolutionaries, whom he dismissed in his account as a "foreign legion". He regained his affiliation to the Ludwig-Maximilians-Universität München and after the revolution's suppression by the Freikorps, with whom he critically sympathised, he worked as an unpaid lecturer (Privatdozent) in modern French literature for one term of the 1919/20 academic year.

From 1920 until 1935 he was Professor of Romance Languages at the Technical University of Dresden.

=== Third Reich ===
Despite his conversion to Protestantism in 1912 and his strong identification with German culture, Klemperer's life started to worsen considerably after the Nazis' seizure of power in 1933. Under the 1933 Nazi "First Racial Definition", a "Jew" was a racial category, not just a religious one. As such, Klemperer was considered a Jew even though he had converted to Protestantism. (This racial definition included those with only one Jewish parent or even one Jewish grandparent; a person was considered a "Mischling" if he had one Jewish parent or grandparent, regardless of religious belief.)

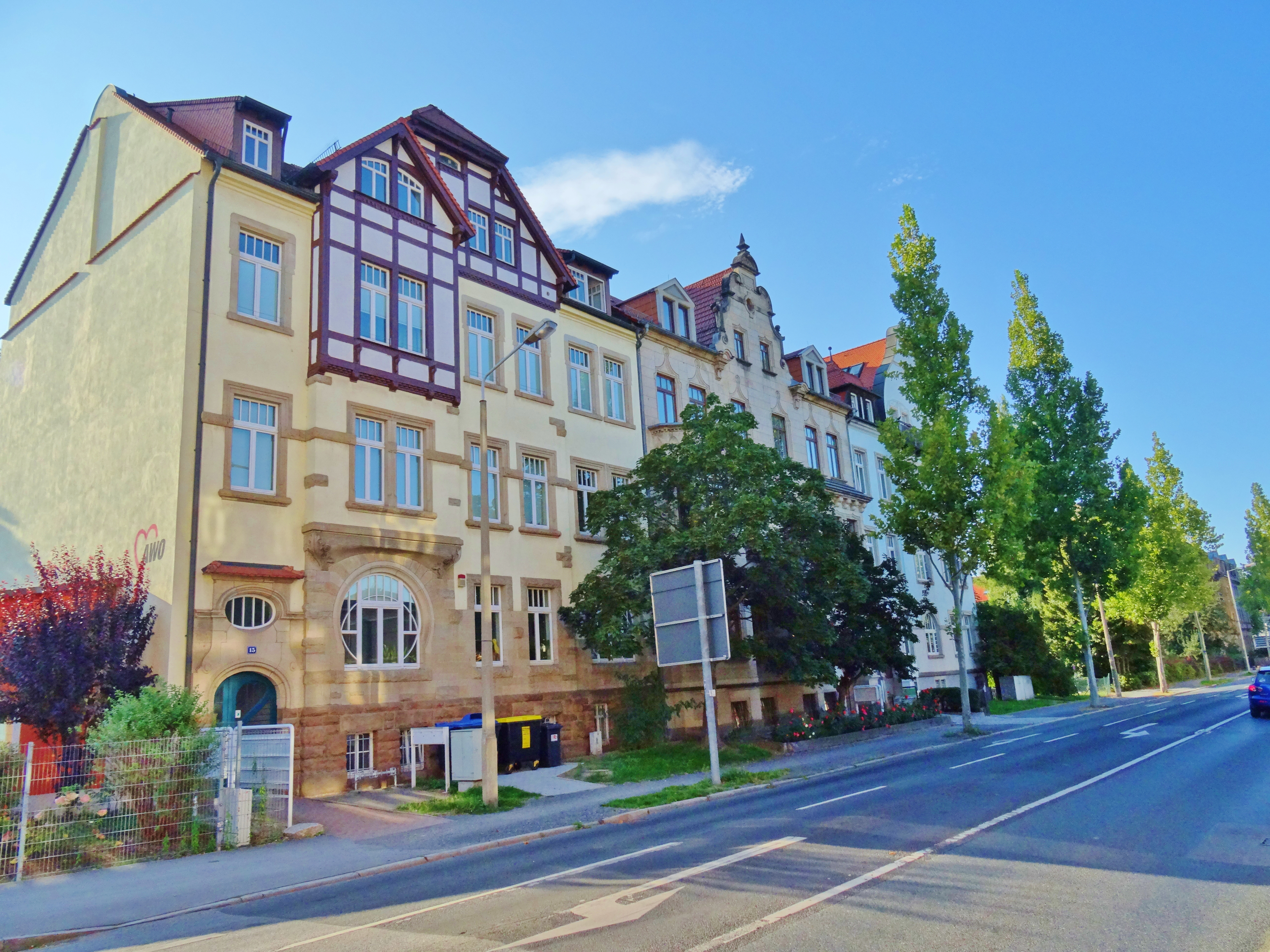
The house at Maxim Gorki Street No 16 in Pirna, where he hid his diaries

In April 1933, the Law for the Restoration of the Professional Civil Service was passed removing all non-Aryan professors from their profession, with the exception of those who had fought in World War I. This exception allowed Klemperer to continue in his position a little longer, although without the right to use the university library or other faculty privileges. Klemperer was gradually forced out of his job and finally forced to retire on 1 May 1935. His pension amounted to about half of his salary, so money was even tighter than before.

In May 1938, the Klemperers' housekeeper resigned due to a law that prohibited Jews from employing Aryan women. In August 1938, by law every German Jew was obliged to bear a first name featuring on a published list of Jewish names. If they didn't already do so, they had to add the name Sarah or Israel (respectively) as a middle name on all official documents. This allowed all Jews to be identified as Jewish whenever they were required to give their full name. (Klemperer dropped the middle name Israel as soon as he could safely do so.) In December 1938, Jews lost the right to drive and the couple had to sell their car.

That same year, and subsequently, Klemperer was so dismayed with the spread of antisemitism, even among those who professed to be against the Nazis, that he from time to time entertained the possibility of emigration to the U.S. His brother Georg had moved there. His niece and some of his friends had also moved abroad.

A diary entry—for April 10, 1940—records other problems with emigration: "Meeting with the emigration adviser of the Jewish Community, result less than zero: You really must get out—we see no possibility. American-Jewish committees support only observant Jews." In the end his connection to his fatherland was too strong, even after Kristallnacht in November 1938, and the outbreak of war. During the pogrom later in November 1938 their house was searched by Nazis who found Klemperer's saber from World War I—he was arrested briefly and released. By this time he had come to concede that "No one can take my Germanness away from me, but my nationalism and patriotism are gone forever."

Since his wife, Eva, was "Aryan", Klemperer avoided deportation, often narrowly, but in 1940, he and his wife were rehoused under miserable conditions in a "Jews' House" (Judenhaus) with other "mixed couples". Here, and especially when he ventured out, or at factories where he was forced to work, he was routinely questioned, mistreated, and humiliated by the Gestapo, Hitler Youth members and Dresden citizens. Only because of his "Aryan" wife were the couple able to procure food enough to subsist. Klemperer and his fellow Jews became aware only gradually of the nature and scale of the Holocaust, even as they watched friends and neighbors deported and as their own risk of deportation mounted.

=== Flight ===
On 13 February 1945, Klemperer witnessed the delivery of notices of deportation to some of the last remaining members of the Jewish community in Dresden, and feared that the authorities would soon also send him to his death. On the following three nights the Allies heavily bombed Dresden for the first time, causing massive damage and a firestorm; during the chaos that followed, Klemperer removed his yellow star (an act punishable by death if discovered) on 19 February, joined a refugee column, and escaped into American-controlled territory. He and his wife survived, and Klemperer's diary narrates their return, largely on foot through Bavaria and Eastern Germany, to their house in Dölzschen, on the outskirts of Dresden. They managed to reclaim the house, which the Nazis had "aryanized".

=== Post-war ===
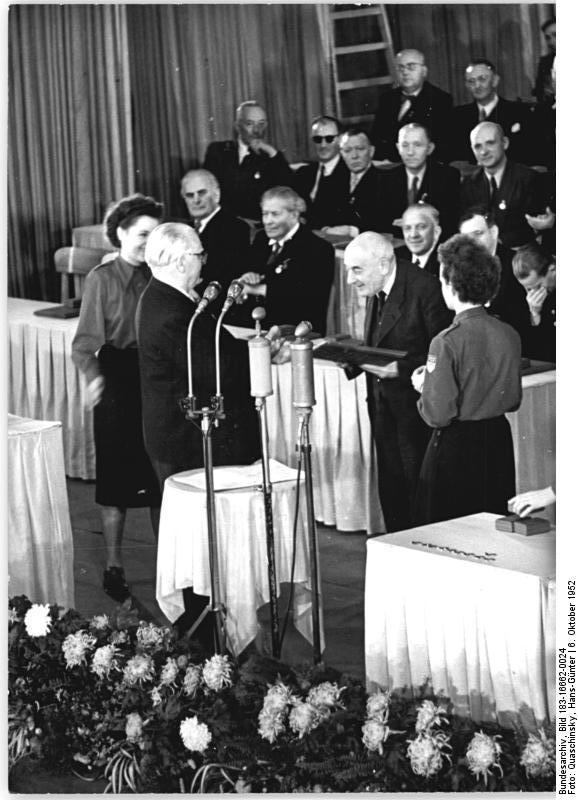
Victor Klemperer receiving a DDR National Prize in 1952

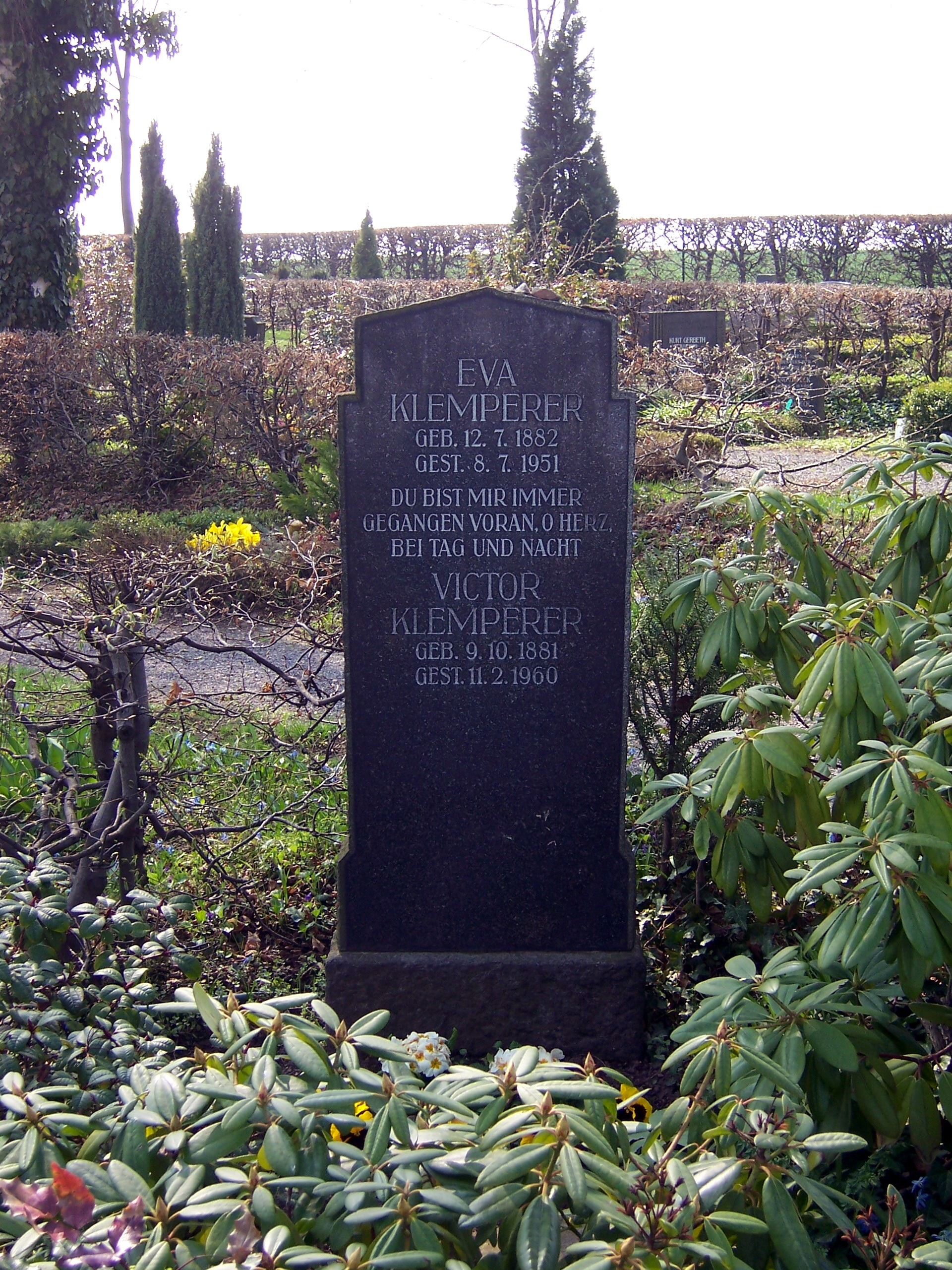
The grave of Victor and Eva Klemperer in Dresden

After the war, Klemperer joined the communist Socialist Unity Party of Germany, and was reinstated in his post at Technical University of Dresden. His former friend, historian Johannes Kühn, who had severed connections with Klemperer upon his dismissal from the University of Dresden, welcomed him back as if nothing had happened.

Klemperer became a significant cultural figure in East Germany, holding professor positions at the University of Greifswald, Martin Luther University Halle-Wittenberg and Friedrich Wilhelm University of Berlin. He was a delegate of the Cultural Association of the GDR in the GDR's Parliament (Volkskammer) from 1950 to 1958, and frequently mentioned in his later diary his frustration at its lack of power and its largely ceremonial role.

== Personal life and death ==
Victor Klemperer married Eva Schlemmer, a pianist and an "Aryan" German, in 1906. Intermarriage helped Victor Klemperer to survive. The Nazi Government could not effectively force people to divorce, so many intermarried Jewish and non-Jewish Germans stayed married, despite scrutiny by others. Eva died in 1951. Klemperer married again, to Hadwig, a student much younger than himself. He died on 11 February 1960.

== Work ==
- The Language of the Third Reich, a study on the language of Nazi propaganda.
- Munich 1919 : Diary of a Revolution, John Wiley and Sons Ltd 2022. ISBN 9781509510597
- Tagebücher (Berlin, Aufbau), Klemperer's diary, published in 1995, an immediate literary sensation and rapidly became a bestseller in Germany. An English translation of the years spanning the Nazi seizure of power through Klemperer's death has appeared in three volumes: I Shall Bear Witness (1933 to 1941), To The Bitter End (1942 to 1945) and The Lesser Evil (1945 to 1959).

Klemperer's diary, which he kept up throughout the Nazi era, provides an account of day-to-day life under the Third Reich. Klemperer's diaries from the Nazi period chronicle the restricted daily life of Jews during the Nazi terror, including the onset of a succession of prohibitions concerning many aspects of everyday existence, such as finances, transportation, medical care, the maintenance and use of household help, food and diet, and the possession of appliances, newspapers, and other items. He also gives accounts of suicides, household searches, and the deportation of his friends, mostly to Theresienstadt. Throughout his experience, Klemperer maintained his sense of identity as a German, expressing even in 1942 that "I am German, and still waiting for the Germans to come back; they have gone to ground somewhere." Although this is one of the phrases most evocative of Klemperer's despair over the corruption of German culture, his sense of who and what was truly "German" evolved considerably during the war. Especially in the final weeks of the war and immediately after Germany's surrender, when Klemperer was free to mix and talk with (or eavesdrop on) a wide variety of Germans, his observations of the "German" identity show how complex this question was, and why it was so central to his purpose in writing the LTI and his journals.

In the diary, the much-feared Gestapo is seen carrying out daily, humiliating, and brutal house searches, delivering beatings, hurling insults, and robbing inhabitants of coveted foodstuffs and other household items. In addition, the diary relates the profound uncertainty all Germans—Jews and non-Jews—experienced because of the paucity of reliable information about the war's progress, largely due to the propaganda so central to the Reich's conduct of the war and of the Final Solution. This diary details the Nazis' perversion of the German language for propaganda purposes in entries that Klemperer used as the basis for his book LTI – Lingua Tertii Imperii.

== Awards ==
- In 1995, Geschwister-Scholl-Preis for Ich will Zeugnis ablegen bis zum letzten. Tagebücher 1933–1945.

== Documentary ==
In 2000, Herbert Gantschacher wrote, together with Katharina and Jürgen Rostock, the documentary play Chronicle 1933–1945 using original documents from the biographies of Robert Ley and Victor Klemperer. The first performance took place in 2000 in the documentation centre at the planned "Strength Through Joy" beach resort Prora on the island of Rügen in Germany.

In 2004, Stan Neumann directed a documentary based on Klemperer's diaries, La langue ne ment pas (Language does not lie), which considers the importance of Klemperer's observations and the role of the witness in extreme situations.

== See also ==
- List of Holocaust diarists
- List of diarists
- Union of Persecutees of the Nazi Regime
