= Tell Ye Your Children =

1998 history textbook about The Holocaust

- Author: Stéphane Bruchfeld and Paul A. Levine
- Original title: Om detta må ni berätta
- Language: Swedish
- Publisher: Living History Project, The Swedish Government Offices
- Publication date: 1998
- ISBN: 9789163063855

Tell Ye Your Children: A Book about the Holocaust in Europe, 1933–1945 (Swedish: …om detta må ni berätta…: En bok om Förintelsen i Europa 1933–1945, lit. '…About This You May Tell…: A Book about the Holocaust in Europe 1933–1945') is a 1998 history textbook about The Holocaust written by Stéphane Bruchfeld and Paul A. Levine. The textbook is used in more than twenty countries as part of their effort to educate about The Holocaust. It is most often used by teachers and students from middle school through graduate Holocaust history and Genocide Studies seminars. Originally published in Swedish, it has been translated into English, Finnish, Danish, Norwegian, French, German, Ukrainian, Croatian, Estonian, Latvian, Japanese, Spanish, Serbo-Croatian, Turkish, Persian, Kurdish, Arabic, and Russian.

== Background ==
Tell Ye Your Children was commissioned by the Swedish government as part of a national educational campaign to teach Swedish citizens about the Holocaust. It was the first major project initiated by former Prime Minister of Sweden Göran Persson in 1997. During a parliamentary debate in June 1997, Persson initiated an information campaign about the Holocaust, including what really happened and what values and attitudes led to it. The project was named "Living History".

== Content ==
Tell Ye Your Children's title is based on a quotation from the Bible, Book of Joel 1:2–3, which, in the New International Version reads, "Hear this, you elders; listen, all who live in the land. Has anything like this ever happened in your days or in the days of your ancestors? Tell it to your children, and let your children tell it to their children, and their children to the next generation." The title tells the purpose, which is to help parents discuss the Holocaust with their children.

Tell Ye Your Children presents facts about the Holocaust and attempts to explain how it came to be. It is not strictly chronological: it is both chronological and thematic.
