= LTI – Lingua Tertii Imperii =

Book by Victor Klemperer

- Book cover of 1982 Polish edition
- Author: Victor Klemperer
- Publisher: Aufbau-Verlag
- Publication date: 1947
- Publication place: Berlin

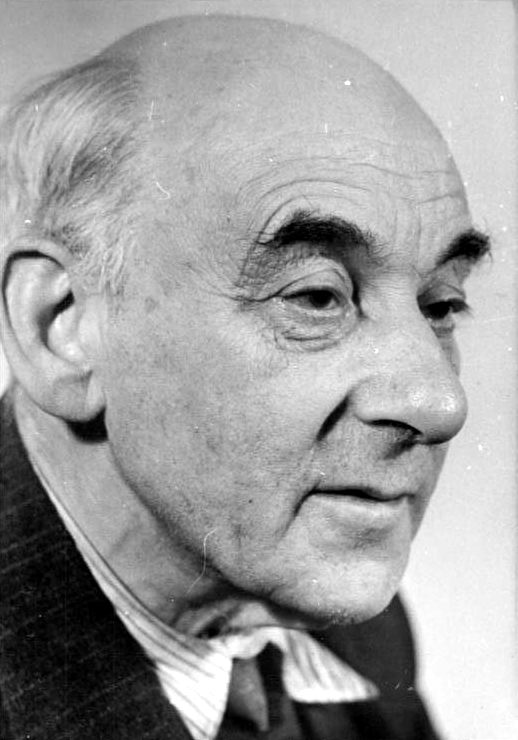
Victor Klemperer

LTI – Lingua Tertii Imperii: Notizbuch eines Philologen (1947) is a book by Victor Klemperer, Professor of Literature at the Dresden University of Technology. The title, half in Latin and half in German, translates to The Language of the Third Reich: A Philologist's Notebook; the book is published in English translation as The Language of the Third Reich.

== Content ==
Lingua Tertii Imperii studies the way that Nazi propaganda altered the German language to inculcate people with the ideas of Nazism. The book was written in the form of personal notes which Klemperer wrote in his diary, especially from the rise of the Nazi regime in 1933, and even more after 1935, when Klemperer was stripped of his academic title because he was of Jewish descent. His diary became a notebook in which he noted and commented on the linguistic relativity of the German used by Nazi officials, ordinary citizens, and even fellow Jews. Klemperer wrote the book, based on his notes, in 1945–1946.

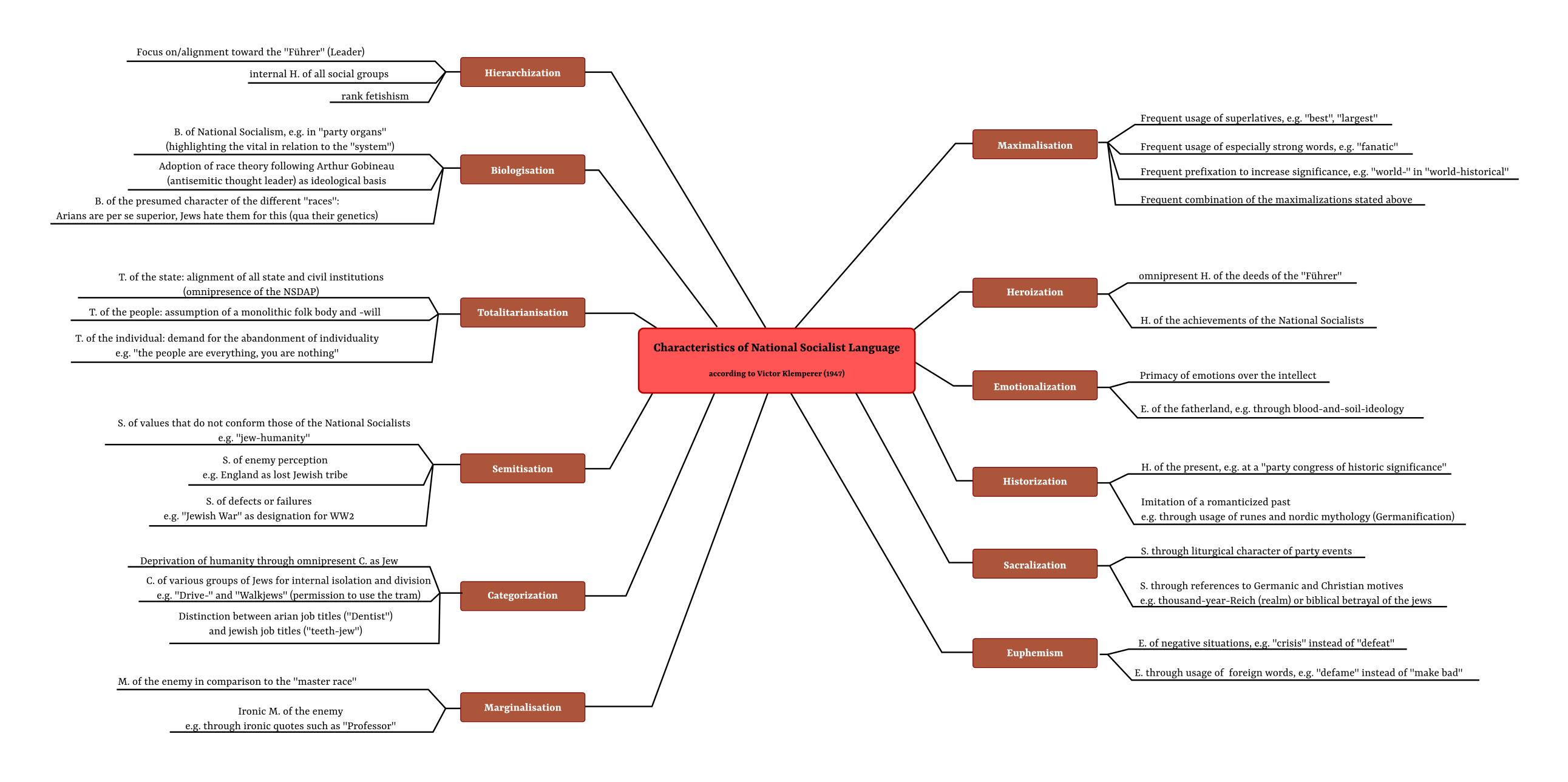
Categorized abstract

Klemperer's book demonstrates changes in the German language in most of the population. In contrast, the text also emphasizes the idea that resistance to oppression begins by questioning the constant use of buzzwords. Both the book and its author unexpectedly survived the war. Lingua Tertii Imperii was first published in 1947 in Germany.

It underlines odd constructions of words intended to give a scientific, or neutral, aspect to otherwise heavily engaged discourses, as well as significant every-day behaviour.

== Examples ==
Klemperer notes that much of the Nazi language involved appropriating old words and adapting their meaning, rather than making new ones. Among the examples he recorded of propagandistic language use were the following.

=== Recurrent words ===
- Artfremd ('alien to the species')
- Ewig ('eternal') E.gr.: der ewige Jude ('the eternal Jew'); das ewige Deutschland ('the eternal Germany')
- fanatisch ('fanatical'), Fanatismus ('fanaticism') – used in a particularly Orwellian way: strongly positively connoted for the "good" side, and strongly negatively connoted for the "bad" side
- Instinkt ('instinct')
- spontan ('spontaneous')

=== Euphemisms (Schleierwörter) ===
- Evakuierung ('evacuation'): deportation
- Holen ('pick up'): arrest
- Konzentrationslager ('concentration camp'): extermination camp
- Krise ('crisis'): defeat
- Sonderbehandlung ('special treatment'): murder
- Verschärfte Vernehmung ('strengthened interrogation'): torture

=== Recurrent expressions and motives ===
- the war "imposed" onto a peace-loving Führer. (France and the United Kingdom did declare war on Germany, but only after Germany remilitarized the Rhineland, annexed Austria, annexed Czechoslovakia and invaded Poland.)
- the "incommensurable hate" of the Jews – an example of Orwellian ambiguity: the Jews have an "incommensurable hate" of the Third Reich (aggressive or conspiratorial), but the German people have an "incommensurable hate" of the Jews (spontaneous and legitimate).
- Examples taken from Victor Klemperer's diaries:
  - 1 January 1935 – language tertii imperii: Lutze's New Year message to the SA ... Our "fanatical will" twice in a non-pejorative sense. Emphasis on believing without understanding. (1) "fanatical engagement of the SA," (2) "fanatical sense of commitment."
  - 24 November 1936 – On the language of the Third Reich: ...The Führer must be followed blindly, blindly! They do not need to explain anything at all, since they are accountable to no one. Today it occurred to me: Never has the tension between human power and powerlessness, human knowledge and human stupidity been so overwhelmingly great as now.
  - 19 February 1938 – ... the basic principle of the whole language of the Third Reich became apparent to me: a bad conscience; its triad: defending oneself, praising oneself, accusing – never a moment of calm testimony.
  - 23 May 1938 – The aim of education in the Third Reich and of the language of the Third Reich, is to expand the popular stratum in everyone to such an extent that the thinking stratum is suffocated.
  - 29 August 1939 – Lingua ... there is no longer any talk of Bolshevists, but instead of the Russian people.
  - 31 December 1940 – language tertii imperii: In Hitler's New Year Order of the Day to the troops again the "victories of unparalleled dimensions," again the American superlative, "The year of 1941 will see the accomplishment of the greatest victory in our history."

=== Prefixes ===
- Groß- ('great')
- Volk(s)-: Volk, 'people'; Volks (prefix), 'of the people' or 'for the people'). Volksgemeinschaft designated the racially pure community of nations. Volkswagen is an example of a term which has outlived the Third Reich.
- Welt- ('world'; as in Weltanschauung, 'intuition '): this was quite a rare, specific and cultured term before the Third Reich, but became an everyday word. It came to designate the instinctive understanding of complex geo-political problems by the Nazis, which allowed them to openly begin invasions, twist facts or violate human rights, in the name of a higher ideal and in accordance to their theory of the world.

=== Neologisms ===
- arisieren ("to aryanise")
- aufnorden ("to nordicise up", make more Nordic).
- entjuden ("to de-Jew"). Conversely, after the war, a strong trend of Entnazifizierung ("denazification") took place.
- Untermenschentum ("sub-humanity", from Untermensch)

== See also ==
- Big Lie
- Doublespeak
- Glossary of Nazi Germany
- Joseph Goebbels
- Groupthink
- Language of Nazi concentration camps
- Newspeak
- Philology
- Völkischer Beobachter

== Sources ==
- "'Verschärfte Vernehmung'". The Atlantic. 29 May 2007.
- Klemperer, Victor (1999). I Will Bear Witness. New York: Modern Library. ISBN 9780375753787.
- Krajewski, Bruce (2002). "Rev. of Klemperer, The Language of the Third Reich". Modern Language Quarterly. 63 (1): 133–36. doi:10.1215/00267929-63-1-133. S2CID 162045525.
- Wegner, Gregory Paul (2004). "Rev. of Klemperer, The Language of the Third Reich". Holocaust and Genocide Studies. 18 (1): 106–108. doi:10.1093/hgs/dch042.

== General references ==
- Klemperer, Victor (May 2006). Language of the Third Reich: LTI — Lingua Tertii Imperii. Continuum Impacts. ISBN 978-0826491305.
- Klemperer, Victor (2010). Fröhlich, Elke (ed.). LTI — Lingua Tertii Imperii: Notizbuch eines Philologen (in German) (24th ed.). Stuttgart: Reclam. ISBN 978-315-010743-0.
