= Benjamin Frommer =

American historian

- Born: 1969 (age 56–57)
- Occupation: Historian

Academic background
- Education: Columbia University (BA); Harvard University (PhD)

Academic work
- Sub-discipline: History of Eastern and Central Europe
- Institutions: Northwestern University

Benjamin Frommer (born 1969) is an American historian, focused on history of Central Europe in 20th century. His work has concerns topics of genocide and ethnic cleansing, collaboration and resistance, transitional justice, and Central/Eastern European nationalism. Much of his work focuses on The Protectorate of Bohemia and Moravia. He is currently the Charles Deering McCormick Professor and was formerly the Wayne V. Jones Research Professor of History at Northwestern University. He is fluent in Czech, French, German, and Slovak and has reading knowledge of Russian.

== Early life and education ==
He received his Bachelor of Arts from Columbia University in 1991, and his Master of Arts as well as Doctor of Philosophy degree in history in 1999 from Harvard University.

== Teaching ==
Frommer currents teaches Nations and Nationalism (graduate), The Historiography of the Habsburg Monarchy (graduate), and The Historiography of Communist East Europe (graduate) at Northwestern University.

== Works ==
- Frommer, Benjamin (2005). National Cleansing: Retribution against Nazi Collaborators in Postwar Czechoslovakia. Cambridge: Cambridge University Press. ISBN 019998851X.
- Edgar, Adrienne; Frommer, Benjamin, eds. (2020). Intermarriage from Central Europe to Central Asia: Mixed Families in the Age of Extremes. University of Nebraska Press. ISBN 978-1-4962-0211-6.
- Frommer, Benjamin L. (2020). "Der Holocaust in Böhmen und Mähren". In Čapková, Kateřina; Kieval, Hillel J. (eds.). Zwischen Prag und Nikolsburg: Jüdisches Leben in den böhmischen Ländern (in German). Vandenhoeck & Ruprecht. pp. 265–318. ISBN 978-3-525-36427-7.
- The Ghetto Without Walls: The Identification, Isolation, and Elimination of Bohemian and Moravian Jewry, 1938–1945 (forthcoming)
