= Cookbooks of the Holocaust =

Recipe books produced in Nazi concentration camps

During The Holocaust, people imprisoned in Nazi concentration camps and ghettos suffered from starvation and malnutrition. Food and recipes were a frequent topic of discussion, and cookbooks of these recipes (sometimes called "fantasy cookbooks") were created and shared among prisoners.

According to the United States Holocaust Memorial Museum, cookbooks "evoke memories of happier times and bear witness to the will to create under the most dire of circumstances. In some cases, cookbooks were even ways of preserving a past that the Nazis and their collaborators were rapidly destroying". They were written using scraps of paper or stolen office supplies.

Examples of such cookbooks are held by the United States Holocaust Memorial Museum and the Sydney Jewish Museum; there are known to be at least six extant examples of "fantasy cookbooks" from the concentration camps. Publications derived from cookbooks of the Holocaust include In Memory's Kitchen: A Legacy from the Women of Terezín and Recipes from Auschwitz. In 2015, a French documentary film, Imaginary Feasts, was created that profiled these fantasy cookbooks; another film, Mina's Recipe Book, specifically recorded the story of In Memory's Kitchen and its creator, Mina Pächter.
