= Yugoslav prisoners in Nazi concentration camps =

World War II internment of Yugoslav citizens by Germany

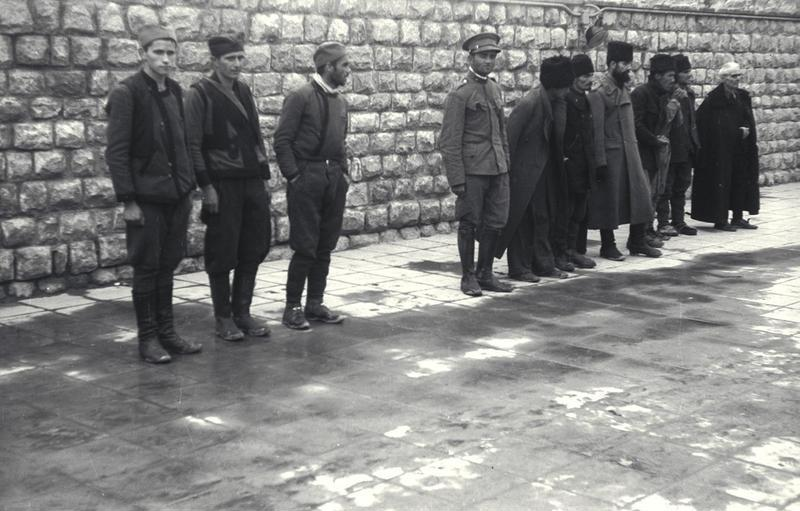
Yugoslav prisoners, newly arrived at Mauthausen, are forced to line up against the Klagemauer ("wailing wall").

During World War II, tens of thousands of Yugoslav citizens were imprisoned in Nazi concentration camps, including more than 6,000 at Mauthausen and 20,000 in Auschwitz. At least 536 Yugoslavs were victims of Nazi human experimentation in the concentration camps.
