= Polish prisoners in Nazi concentration camps =

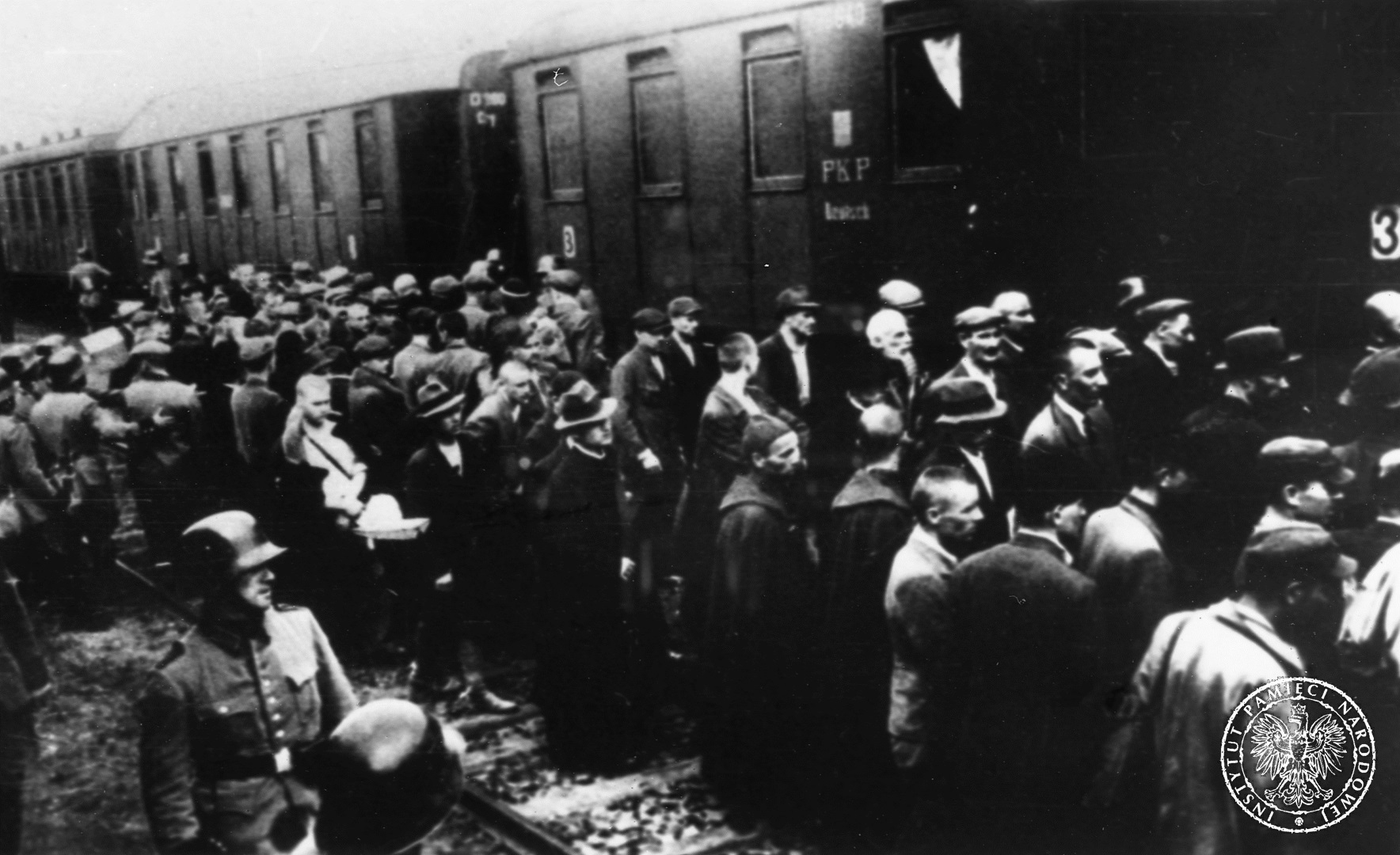
Polish political prisoners of the first mass transport to Auschwitz concentration camp at the railway station in Tarnów, 14 June 1940

During World War II, hundreds of thousands of non-Jewish Polish citizens were imprisoned in Nazi German concentration camps for various reasons, including the Polish resistance movement in World War II.

In Auschwitz alone, there were between 130,000 and 150,000 Polish prisoners, about half of whom perished during their incarceration.
