= Laws requiring teaching of the Holocaust =

A number of countries maintain laws that require the presentation of information concerning actions of the government of Germany regarding Jews in its territory during the period of that government's control by the National Socialist (Nazi) German Worker's Party from 1933 to 1945, commonly referred to as the Holocaust. In the United States, laws of this kind are maintained by individual states and typically specify curriculum content and the ages of the pupils to which various portions of the curricula are to be presented.

Many of the particulars of conformance with these laws are specified or influenced by policies and pronouncements of the Task Force for International Cooperation on Holocaust Education, Holocaust Remembrance, and Holocaust Research. A country's membership in this organization, however, does not necessarily imply any legal mandate within the said country regarding Holocaust education.

Laws prohibiting "Holocaust denial" are maintained by many—but not all—of the same jurisdictions that have these laws. These laws apply to individuals and involve criminal punishment and therefore they are in all cases separate statutes.

== Nations and U.S. states ==
As of June 2026, laws mandating education in the Holocaust were on the books in Austria, France, Germany, Hungary, Israel, the Netherlands, Poland, Switzerland, Sweden, parts of the United Kingdom (Scotland does not have mandatory Holocaust education), and Australia. It is also mandatory in some of the provinces in Canada.

In the United States, the states of Arizona, Arkansas, California, Colorado, Connecticut, Delaware, Florida, Illinois, Kentucky, Maine, Michigan, Missouri, Nebraska, New Hampshire, New Jersey, New York, North Carolina, Oklahoma, Oregon, Pennsylvania, Rhode Island, Texas, and Wisconsin. In total, 23 states have mandatory Holocaust education.

Nation or U.S. state	Year enacted	Citation	Key wording
California	1985		Instruction shall provide a foundation for understanding ... human rights issues, with particular attention to the study of the inhumanity of genocide, slavery, and the Holocaust, and contemporary issues.
Illinois	1989	105 ILCS 5/27-20.3	Every public elementary school and high school shall include in its curriculum a unit of instruction studying the events of the Nazi atrocities of 1933 to 1945. This period in world history is known as the Holocaust, during which 6,000,000 Jews and millions of non-Jews were exterminated. One of the universal lessons of the Holocaust is that national, ethnic, racial, or religious hatred can overtake any nation or society, leading to calamitous consequences.
New Jersey	1991		Every board of education shall include instruction on the Holocaust and genocides in an appropriate place in the curriculum of all elementary and secondary school pupils. The instruction shall enable pupils to identify and analyze applicable theories concerning human nature and behavior: to understand that genocide is a consequence of prejudice and discrimination: and to understand that issues of moral dilemma and conscience have a profound impact on life. The instruction shall further emphasize the personal responsibility that each citizen bears to fight racism and hatred whenever and wherever it happens.
Florida	1994	F.S. 1003.42(2)(g)	The history of the Holocaust (1933–1945), the systematic, planned annihilation of European Jews and other groups by Nazi Germany, a watershed event in the history of humanity, to be taught in a manner that leads to an investigation of human behavior, an understanding of the ramifications of prejudice, racism, and stereotyping, and an examination of what it means to be a responsible and respectful person, for the purposes of encouraging tolerance of diversity in a pluralistic society and for nurturing and protecting democratic values and institutions.
New York	1994	Education Title 1 Art. 17, Sec. 801	The regents of the University of the State of New York shall prescribe courses of instruction in patriotism (and) citizenship and human rights issues, with particular attention to the study of the inhumanity of genocide, slavery, and the Holocaust, to be maintained and followed in all the schools of the state.
Pennsylvania	2014	SB 47	Each public school student shall receive mandatory instruction in the Holocaust, genocide and human rights violations from grade six through grade twelve. The instruction shall be integrated within the social studies and language arts courses of study required in accordance with the State Board of Education regulations.
Michigan	2016	Public Act No. 170	Social studies curriculum for grades 8 to 12 includes age- and grade-appropriate instruction about genocide, including, but not limited to, the Holocaust and the Armenian Genocide. The legislature recommends a combined total of 6 hours of this instruction during grades 8 to 12.
Rhode Island	2016	2016-H 7488A	The legislation requires each district to include in its curriculum a unit on the Holocaust and genocide for every student by the time he or she graduates. The subject could be taught in either middle school or high school, as the local district deems appropriate.
Connecticut	2018	Public Act 18-24	Each local and regional board of education shall include Holocaust and genocide education and awareness as part of the social studies curriculum for the school district.
Kentucky	2018	HB 128	Every public middle and high school's curriculum shall include instruction on the Holocaust and other cases of genocide.
Texas	2019	SB 1828	Holocaust Remembrance Week shall include age-appropriate instruction, as determined by each school district. Instruction shall include (1) information about the history of and lessons learned from the Holocaust; (2) participation, in person or using technology, in learning projects about the Holocaust; and (3) the use of materials developed or approved by the Texas Holocaust and Genocide Commission.
Oregon	2019	SB 664	Requires school districts to provide instruction about the Holocaust and genocide beginning with the 2020–21 school year.
Colorado	2020	HB 20 - 1336	Each school district Board of Education and charter school shall incorporate academic standards on Holocaust and genocide studies into an existing course that is currently a condition of high school graduation.
Delaware	2020	HB 318	This Act requires the Department of Education to establish and implement a curriculum on the Holocaust and genocide for students in grades 6 through 12.
New Hampshire	2020	SB 727	Knowledge of civics and government, economics, geography, history, and Holocaust and genocide education to enable them to participate in the democratic process and to make informed choices as responsible citizens. Additionally, there will be established a commission to study best practices for teaching students how intolerance, bigotry, antisemitism, and national, ethnic, racial, or religious hatred and discrimination have evolved in the past and can evolve into mass violence and genocide, such as the Holocaust.
Wisconsin	2021	WI Act 30	The law requires that every school district incorporate the teaching of the Holocaust and other genocides into the social studies curriculum and is taught at least once in grades 5–8 and at least once in grades 9–12.
Arkansas	2021	SB 160	Beginning in the 2022–23 school year, Holocaust education shall be taught in all public schools in a manner that: (1) Generates an understanding of the causes, course, and effects of the Holocaust; (2) Develops dialogue with students on the ramifications of bullying, bigotry, stereotyping, and discrimination; and (3) Encourages tolerance of diversity and reverence for human dignity for all citizens in a pluralistic society.
Arizona	2021	HB 2241	The law requires instruction in the Holocaust and other genocides at least twice between 7th and 12th grades.
Maine	2021	LD 1644	The Maine Department of Education requires Holocaust, genocide, and African American studies in-state public school curricula.
North Carolina	2021	SB 105	Starting in the 2023–24 school year, middle and high schools will be required to integrate lessons about the Holocaust into English and social studies classes.
Oklahoma	2022	SB 1671	Starting in the 2022–23 school year, students in grades 6–12 in Oklahoma will be required to have Holocaust education.
Nebraska	2022	LB 888	Requires the State Board of Education to adopt academic standards for education on the Holocaust and other acts of genocide beginning in the 2022–23 school year.
Missouri	2022	SB 681	Requires classes from sixth grade through high school to designate a week to teach about the Holocaust, using materials developed by the Missouri Holocaust Education and Awareness Commission.

== Education plans by state ==
The United States Holocaust Memorial Museum has opened a form so that state governments can have their education plan websites available for patrons. Of the 50 states, 23 have education plans and opted to have them posted on the museum website. The states involved, with links to their plans are:

Arizona Arkansas California Colorado Connecticut Delaware Florida Georgia Illinois Indiana Kentucky Maine Michigan Missouri New Hampshire New York North Carolina Oklahoma Rhode Island Tennessee Texas Virginia Wisconsin

According to the museum, further resources about these education plans are available on the Association of Holocaust Organizations website.

== Efficacy of Holocaust education practice ==
According to an article released by ASU in August of 2021, Governor Doug Ducey signed into law HB 2241, which mandated student education on topics of genocide a minimum of two times from 7th through 12th grades. The vice president of the Phoenix Holocaust Association, Janice Friebaum, stated that there has not been a comprehensive review of state laws that mandate Holocaust education, to establish their quality of education and generally successful implementation. The ASU article also brought to light a 2020 study by the Pew Research Center demonstrating that less than half of Americans were able to ascertain that Hitler came into political power through democratic processes. Three out of ten Americans stated they did not know how many Jewish people were killed, one in ten overestimated the number, and 15% believe that fewer than 3 million Jewish people lost their lives. Experts in the holocaust and World War II events seem to see a "rise in ignorance and anti-Semitic attacks" (Lindsey Stillman, World War II Studies, Master’s Student) and cite it as the reason they wish to conduct some form of systematic quality control over the education programs on a large scale to ensure their effectiveness.

== Heal Act ==
On December 22, 2022, a new piece of legislation was introduced to the House. The Heal Act, or the Holocaust Education and Antisemitism Lessons Act, sought to conduct a systematic examination of all Holocaust education efforts across public schools nationwide. It seeks to ensure that Holocaust–focused education is effective, thorough, and accurate across the country. Additionally, it will identify all states and local school districts that do and do not require education on these topics. One of the main focuses of the motivation for this legislation is the means for combatting antisemitism and Holocaust denial.

It was introduced to the House with over 60 cosponsors and was a firmly bipartisan effort. This bill is being co-led by Congressman Josh Gottheimer (NJ–5), the Co-Chair of the House Bipartisan Task Force for Combating Antisemitism Congresswoman Kathy Manning (NC-6), House Foreign Affairs Committee chairman Michael McCaul (TX-10), and Congressman Brian Fitzpatrick (PA–1). The official bill can be found here and the official press release can both be viewed online.

According to the official press release from January 27, 2023, there is support across the aisle to pass legislation to improve education on the Holocaust; data and analyses are being released about the state of Holocaust knowledge and antisemitic acts in the United States that are cause for concern for many members of Congress. The press release included statistics related to the understanding of the Holocaust by American respondents. The 2020 survey showed that two-thirds of respondents did not know how many Jewish people died, and out of the Americans between the ages of 18 and 40 who were a part of this survey, 48% were unable to name one concentration camp or ghetto. The article also cites a 34% increase in Antisemitic Incidents in 2021 from 2020, recording 2,700 throughout the U.S. that year. Members of the ADL, Jewish Federation of North America (JFNA), American Jewish Committee, Orthodox Union Advocacy Effort, Religious Action Center of Reform Judaism, B’nai B’rith International, and many more all shared a common sentiment that the education in the U.S. requires reformation, the increase in antisemitic attacks should be stopped, and a plea to congress to pass the HEAL Act to begin progress as soon as possible.

Despite the seemingly large amount of support this bill received in Congress, and across the aisle at that, the bill has still not been passed despite its introduction several years ago. There is no conclusive information about its current status or any continuing efforts to get it to the Senate as of May 12, 2024.

== The United Nations and Holocaust Denial ==
Member states of the United Nations spoke out in 2022 about a perceived increase of Holocaust denial or distortion due to social networking and communications technology. On January 13th, 2022, over 70 countries came together in General Assembly to discuss Agenda item 16: Culture of peace. All member states were also given the recommendation “reject without any reservation any denial or distortion of the Holocaust as a historical event, either in full or in part, or any activities to this end.” The UN released an article covering the resolution met in this assembly, which also touches on the fact UNESCO will aid in the development of training programs for teachers and policy guidelines for governmental and educational bodies worldwide. The article also touches on initiatives to combat concerns over the influence of social networking on an increase in antisemitic sentiments; the World Jewish Congress and Facebook signed an agreement to divert traffic searching for Holocaust or Holocaust denial-related keywords to a “joint website” that has been translated in 19 languages.

This concern regarding a rise in intolerance, racism, antisemitism, and hate-fueled violent acts is being discussed by not only the member states but also the UN High Commissioner on Human Rights Michelle Bachelet. She believes widespread reformation of policies and narratives is necessary in order to highlight our “common humanity” and rights. She highlights a study by the Fundamental Rights Agency that stated 89% of respondents have noticed a rise in antisemitism in their countries. According to Bachelet, a significant portion of this rise can be attributed to political profit and strategy, stating “By heightening the emotions of their supporters through campaigns of misinformation and disinformation, they gain media attention, and votes– but they also drive deep, violent and profoundly damaging wedges through societies”.
