= Jourhaus =

Entrance building in Dachau and Gusen concentration camps

Coordinates: 48°16′06″N 11°28′01″E

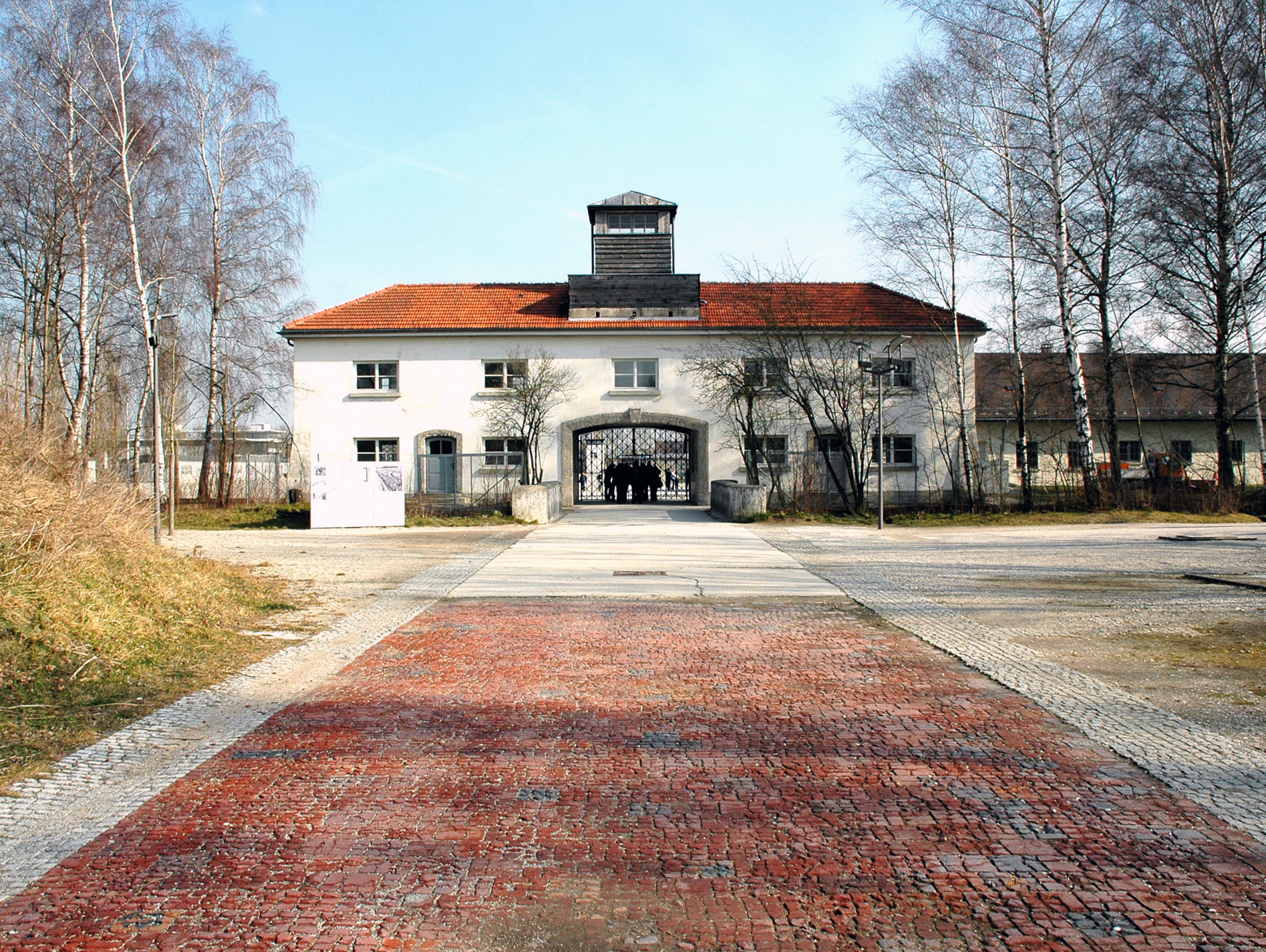
Jourhaus at Dachau, the building with the only entrance to the prisoner's area.(original building)

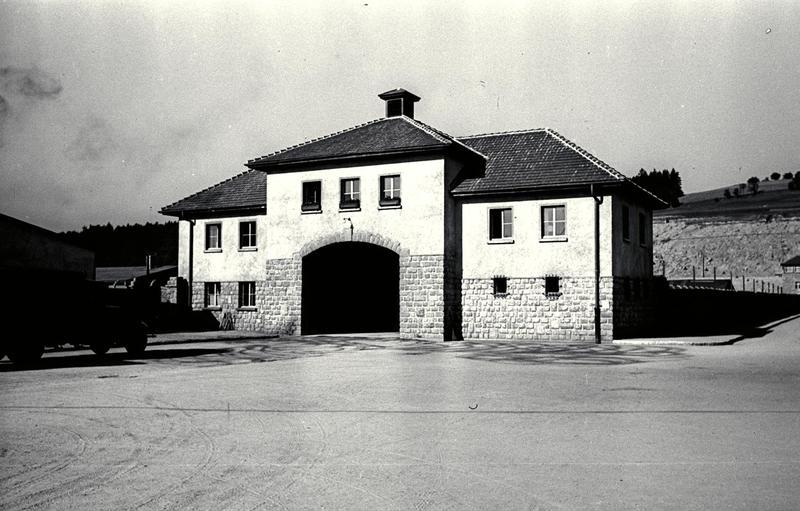
Jourhaus at Gusen I, the entrance to the camp.

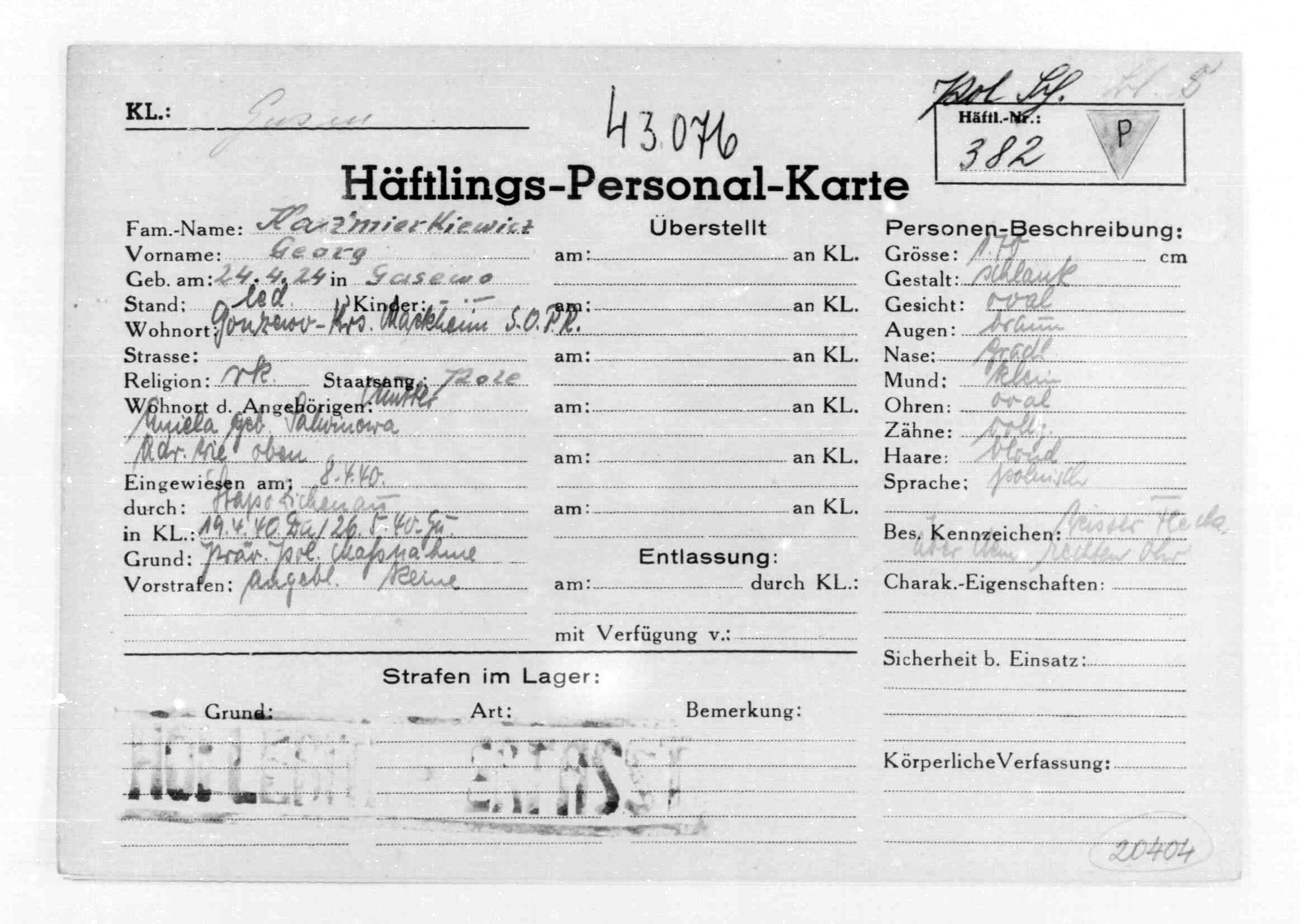
Prisoner file card from registration at Gusen concentration camp.

Jourhaus was the name of the entrance building to the prisoners' camp at Dachau and Gusen concentration camps. It housed administrative and command offices and was the location for disciplinary hearings of prisoners.

== Background ==
=== The Dachau Jourhaus ===
The Dachau Jourhaus was built in 1937 and was the only entrance from the SS grounds to the prisoner's area. The Jourhaus had guard rooms from which the entrance was guarded. Other rooms were used for camp administration, such as the camp Gestapo, the commandant's offices and a room for prisoner functionary use. At night, the guards were in the towers and in the Jourhaus.

The Jourhaus was the only access to the new prisoners' camp. New prisoners came through here for the registration process. The Nazi press was allowed to visit Dachau till 1938 and often described the door with the words, "Arbeit macht frei".

The prisoners who worked at the crematorium had to pass through the Jourhaus to bring the dead from the prisoners' area to the crematorium, which was in the SS area.

When Dachau was liberated on April 29, 1945, U.S. troops first entered the SS area. At the end, they entered the Jourhaus and fired at it.

=== The Gusen Jourhaus ===
The Jourhaus at Gusen was the center of political strength of the SS and was a symbol of violence for the prisoners. It also housed the camp commandant's offices and camp administrative offices. The basement was the camp "prison", called "the Bunker", where prisoners were abused and killed.

== Sources ==
- Stanislav Zámečník, Das war Dachau Comité International de Dachau, Luxemburg (2002) ISBN 2-87996-948-4
