= Language of Nazi concentration camps =

Language of Nazi concentration camps is a common stratum created in various languages of inmates of Nazi concentration camps that described the notions unique to life in the camps and served as lingua franca.

One part of the Nazi camp slang was German language terminology for people, things and events in the camps, where many ordinary German words acquired specific meanings and associations. Another was ad hoc slang based on the various native languages of inmates from different countries.

== See also ==
- Glossary of Nazi Germany
- LTI – Lingua Tertii Imperii – Book by Victor Klemperer
