= Holocaust education =

Efforts to educate populace on the Holocaust

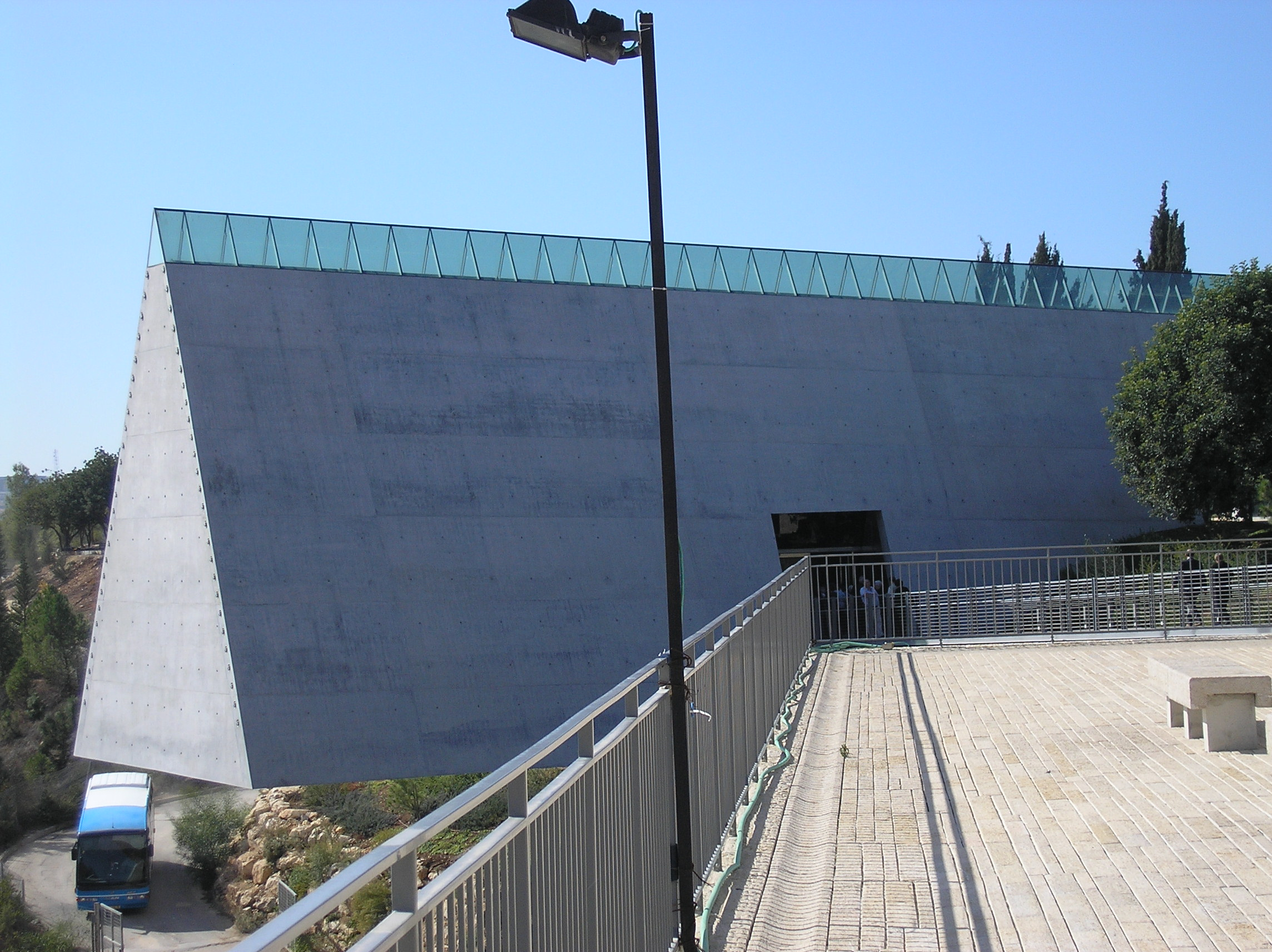
Yad Vashem Holocaust museum

Holocaust education is efforts, in either formal or informal settings, to teach about the Holocaust. Teaching and learning about the Holocaust addresses didactics and learning, under the larger umbrella of education about the Holocaust, which also comprises curricula and textbooks studies. The expression "Teaching and Learning about the Holocaust" is used by the International Holocaust Remembrance Alliance.

While most Holocaust education centers have focused on the genocide committed against Jews by the Nazis, a growing number have expanded their mission and programming to include the murder of other groups by the Nazi and Stalinist regimes, the Armenian genocide, the Rwandan genocide, Kurdish genocide, Croatia–Serbia genocide case, Bosnian genocide, indigenous genocide due to colonization, and other mass exterminations. These centers also address racism, antisemitism, Islamophobia, homophobia, lesbophobia, biphobia, and transphobia.

Holocaust education is based on the premise that it reduces the level of racism and intolerance, but there is a lack of evidence to support this position.

== Lessons of the Holocaust ==
It is debated whether there are moral, ethical, or political lessons to be learned from the Holocaust, and if so what they are. In contemporary discourse, there are many references to proposed lessons to be learned from the Holocaust, which are less common in the work of Holocaust scholars. In his 2016 book of the same title, Michael Marrus classifies the lessons drawn from the Holocaust into the categories of early, Jewish, Israeli, and universal lessons. The authors of a book on Holocaust education separate the lessons into deontological, consequentialist, and ontological lessons. Political scientist Ian Lustick classifies responses to the Holocaust by Israeli Jews into four categories: the Holocaust as a "Zionist Proof-text; Wasting Asset; Object Lesson for safeguarding human rights; and Template for Jewish life". He argues that the last has become hegemonic since the 1980s and that the consequences of seeing enemies as Nazis and threats as existential are damaging to Israel. The existence of specific lessons to be learned from the Holocaust is cited as a justification for Holocaust education, but challenged by some critics. There is a tension between the argument that the Holocaust was a unique event in history and that it has lessons that could be applied to other situations.

== Contexts for teaching about the Holocaust ==
Multiple opportunities exist for teaching about the Holocaust. The text that follows explores the role that teaching and learning about the Holocaust can play in three specific contexts: the prevention of genocide, the promotion of human rights and dealing with traumatic pasts.

=== Prevention of genocide ===
To teach about the particularity of the Holocaust is an opportunity to teach about the nature and dynamics of mass atrocity crimes, i.e. genocide, crimes against humanity and war crimes. The United Nations Framework of Analysis for Atrocity Crimes states "atrocity crimes are considered to be the most serious crimes against humankind. Their status as international crimes is based on the belief that the acts associated with them affect the core dignity of human beings." From a human perspective, but also from social, political and economic perspectives, the costs and consequences of these crimes are immeasurable and extend far beyond the limits of territories where they were perpetrated. Prevention has, therefore, been identified by the international community as a necessity for international peace and stability. Prevention requires continuous efforts and awareness in both the short and long term at the local, national and global levels. Such measures may include institutional initiatives that strengthen the rule of law and protect human rights, ensure a better management of diverse societies and reinforce civil society and independent media.

Education about the Holocaust, as well as education more broadly about genocide and mass atrocities, provides the opportunity to help build critical thinking skills, to augment resilient and effective responses to extreme and exclusionary ideologies, and to illuminate for students how they see themselves in the context of their country's past, present and future.

=== Promotion of human rights ===
The Holocaust began with abuses of power and gross human rights violations by Nazi Germany that over time escalated into war and genocide. While not all human rights violations result in genocide, the Holocaust presents an important case to be explored in a human rights context. The discriminatory policies and practices that dehumanized and marginalized Jews and other minority or political groups (such as depriving individuals of their citizenship) illuminate how human rights violations when combined with factors such as the abuse of power and/or exclusionary ideology can become normalized in a society – even one framed by the rule of law. That these policies escalated over time to a state-sponsored system for murder underlines the dangerous environment that can result when human rights are disavowed. In the aftermath of the Second World War and the Holocaust, a number of international norms promoting human rights were formulated, including the Universal Declaration of Human Rights and the Convention for the Prevention and Punishment of Genocide. Examining this outcome represents a crucial phase in understanding the evolution of human rights concepts.

Still, education about the Holocaust and human rights education are two distinct fields. How educators can create the space for students to examine the history in a manner that respects the tenets of each field requires some thought. A number of organizations have considered these points of intersection, including the European Union Agency for Fundamental Rights (FRA), in partnership with Yad Vashem, and the German Foundation "Remembrance, Responsibility and Future" (EVZ). Thoughtfully integrating examination of the Holocaust into a human rights framework can be an important dimension of education that promotes critical thinking about the roles and responsibilities of members of society and their leaders in the context of human rights.

=== Dealing with the past ===
Educating about the Holocaust is primarily a duty for European countries, in which considerable segments of societies either collaborated with Nazi Germany or stood by. After an initial period of silence and/or minimization, many countries have developed an understanding of the need to educate about the Holocaust and the obligation to investigate and face their national past. Nevertheless, national, professional or individual responsibilities remain heavily debated within and among countries where the Holocaust took place. Even more than 70 years after the events, a self-critical vision of history that accounts for the range of responsibilities in the murder of Jews and other groups such as the Roma and Poles has yet to emerge in many places. Nationalistic ideologies continue to influence the ways in which history is remembered and taught.

In 2017 a Körber Foundation survey found that 40 percent of 14-year-olds in Germany did not know what Auschwitz was. The journalist Alan Posener attributed Germany's "growing historical amnesia" in part to a failure by the German film and television industry to reflect the country's history accurately. The following year a survey organized by the Claims Conference, United States Holocaust Memorial Museum and others found that 41 percent of 1,350 American adults surveyed, and 66 percent of millennials, did not know what Auschwitz was, while 22 percent said they had never heard of the Holocaust. In 2021, a survey by Liberation75 and Western University assessed what 3,593 teens across Canada and the United States know and think about the Holocaust. One in three students reported believing that the Holocaust was fabricated or exaggerated, or being unsure if the Holocaust occurred. In 2025, an annual survey run by the Anti-Defamation League about antisemitic attitudes globally found that out of the more than 58,000 adults surveyed across 103 countries and territories, one in five, or 20 percent, of the participants had not heard about the Holocaust. The survey also found that 48 percent of respondents recognized the Holocaust's historical accuracy, this number falling to 39 percent among 18- to 34-year-olds.

Many post-atrocity communities throughout the world struggle with divided societies. Social cohesion remains fractured and progress is blocked by the country's refusal to deal with its national history of genocide and mass atrocities and the long-term trauma such crimes cause. This challenge increases when conflicting parties or survivors and their tormentors must co-exist in the same society in the aftermaths of atrocity crimes. While some societies opt for an approach of silence, others have found that as a society transitions towards non-violent and humane ways to handle conflict, facing the past can become an important element of the national narrative.

Teaching about a contested history involving atrocities that still affect the present is a particularly challenging task, all the more so because history education is one of the most difficult segments of education systems to reform. Moreover, dealing with the history of past abuses through education often requires a minimal consensus within the society, and therefore institutional support, before new historical narratives accounting for crimes perpetrated can be integrated in curricula and textbooks or tackled by teachers in formal education settings. Such a process is happening in Lithuania, where the Holocaust and the history of the Jews in Lithuania has not been taught adequately until fairly recently.

== Educating about antisemitism ==
Educating learners about antisemitism focuses on equipping them with knowledge, skills and competencies that empower them to contribute to a culture of human rights and resist the stereotypes and misconceptions that lead to discrimination and violence against Jews. While most Holocaust education focuses on the genocide which was committed against Jews by the Nazis, educating students about antisemitism enables them to oppose antisemitism and other forms of prejudice.

== Educating about genocide ==
Genocide education deals with the phenomenon of genocide, while education about the Holocaust focuses above all on the causes and dynamics of the genocide of the Jewish people and responses to it. However, both fields are increasingly interconnected. To date, the Holocaust has been the most researched, documented and widely taught case of genocide.

The institute on the Holocaust & Genocide in Jerusalem established in 1979, believes that it may be the first holocaust education center to address the genocide of all peoples. A growing number of holocaust education centers include genocide, intolerance, hatred, and human rights within their mission, programming, and curriculum.

== The Holocaust in curricula and textbooks ==
The Holocaust in curricula and textbooks discusses the ways in which the Holocaust is presented in secondary school level history and social studies curricula worldwide, and conceptualized and narrated in textbooks. The status of the Holocaust in curricula and textbooks varies considerably worldwide.

Curricula and textbooks, in particular those designed for history teaching, provide both a space for the formation of a condensed canon of knowledge which is considered to be relevant to a specific society, and a means by which claims to social legitimacy may be made. The study of curricula and textbooks enables the reconstruction of patterns of perception and interpretation, or the standards and values which hold sway at any given time. Moreover, they offer insights into the variety of ways in which national identities are conceived of and constructed. They are ideal sources for the following reasons:

1. Curricula and textbooks strive towards the construction of a socially cohesive understanding of history. They not only determine which historical events are considered relevant and thus worth incorporating into a shared inventory of historical understanding, but also prescribe the interpretative framework in which such events may be classified.
2. Textbooks share a relatively homogeneous function across a wide geographical space. They thus meet a prerequisite for the analysis of ways in which concepts of identity change from place to place and of processes of convergence and divergence to which concepts of the Holocaust are subjected.
3. Curricula and textbooks continue to provide reasonably reliable points of reference for educators. The complexity of the Holocaust and the sensitivity towards the social and political consequences of this event which continues to be felt in the present day mean that teachers are often uncertain about how they should teach the Holocaust. As a result, curricula and in particular textbooks are held by educators to provide secure sources of information and of methods to which teachers refer on the assumption that they provide accurate content and reliable didactic and methodological guidelines, which have been compiled by experienced historians, educational experts and authors.
4. Although television, the internet and family stories generally represent the primary sources of knowledge about the Holocaust, curricula and textbooks tell the contemporary formation of historical knowledge because they fix in words the conceptual and narrative categories in which events of the past are to be learnt in a given society. One of the central concerns when comparing both curricula and textbooks, is therefore to ensure that linguistic variations be given due attention. The absence of the words 'Holocaust' or 'Shoah' (or their equivalents in each language), for example, does not mean that this event is not taught, because alternative words or paraphrases may also convey knowledge of the event in unexpected ways.

On November 9, 2022, Liberation75 and the Government of Ontario in Canada announced new mandates for Holocaust education in Ontario public schools. As of September 2023, mandatory Holocaust education will be included in the Grade 6 curriculum.

== Contribution to global citizenship education ==
Global citizenship education aims to develop students to be informed and critically literate, socially connected, respectful of diversity, and ethically responsible and engaged. There exist strong opportunities for aligning education about the Holocaust with the goals of global citizenship education. Understanding how and why the Holocaust happened can help learners reflect on their role as global citizens, develop skills in historical understanding regarding why individuals and states acted the way they did in their given circumstances, and possibly take action on civic issues important for their school and society. Teaching about the Holocaust can, therefore, be expected to provide opportunities for contemporary skill-building, decision-making, and critical self-reflection on one's own role in society. The study of the Holocaust is highly compatible with global citizenship education for at least three key reasons:

- The Holocaust addresses themes that are central concerns of global citizenship education, including human rights and discrimination.
- The Holocaust forms the historical backdrop that informed the development of the principles enshrined in the Universal Declaration of Human Rights, which can be understood concretely by linking them to specific violations before and during the Second World War.
- A review of research about teaching and learning about the Holocaust demonstrates that some approaches can have outcomes that are sought by global citizenship education framework.

UNESCO has stated that Holocaust and genocide education is part of its efforts to promote Global Citizenship Education and a priority within its Education 2030 agenda.

== Evaluation ==
Holocaust education is based on the premise that it reduces the level of racism and intolerance, but there is a lack of evidence to support this position. Despite an increase in Holocaust education and commemoration, the twenty-first century has also seen a rise in right-wing populism and racism in Western countries.

== See also ==
- Genocide studies
- Hate studies
- Holocaust studies
- Laws requiring teaching of the Holocaust
- Facing History and Ourselves

== Sources ==
- This article incorporates text from a free content work. Licensed under CC-BY-SA IGO 3.0 (license statement/permission). Text taken from The International status of education about the Holocaust: a global mapping of textbooks and curricula, 4, 12, 19–20, Carrier, Peter; Fuchs, Eckhardt; Messinger, Torben, UNESCO. UNESCO.
- This article incorporates text from a free content work. Licensed under CC-BY-SA IGO 3.0 (license statement/permission). Text taken from Education about the Holocaust and preventing genocide, 18, 30, 34–35, 51–52, UNESCO, UNESCO. UNESCO.
- This article incorporates text from a free content work. Licensed under CC BY-SA 3.0 IGO. Text taken from Addressing anti-semitism through education: guidelines for policymakers, UNESCO, UNESCO. UNESCO.
