= Portugal and the Holocaust =

Portugal was officially neutral during World War II and the period of the Holocaust in German-occupied Europe. The country had been ruled by an authoritarian political regime led by António de Oliveira Salazar but was considered more sympathetic to the Allies than was neighbouring Francoist Spain.

German expansion led to the passage of substantial numbers of refugees, including some Jews, through Portugal in 1939 and 1940. Fearful of the economic and political consequences, the Salazar regime tightened the rules governing the issuance of transit visas by its consuls in November 1939. The issuing of visas in contravention of regulations was widespread at Portuguese consulates all over Europe, including by Aristides de Sousa Mendes, the Portuguese consul in Bordeaux, who issued thousands of visas to refugees at his own initiative amid the Fall of France in May and June 1940. Large numbers of refugees, including some 60,000 to 80,000 Jews, continued to pass through Portugal on route for the United States and Latin America throughout the war although their numbers fell significantly from 1941. Lisbon was permitted to accommodate a number of foreign Jewish relief organisations.

The Salazar regime was generally aware of the extermination of Jews in German-occupied Europe from 1942 and undertook some limited measures to repatriate Jews with Portuguese citizenship from Vichy France and Axis-occupied Greece. An initiative to intercede on behalf of the Sephardic Jews in the German-occupied Netherlands at the initiative of Moisés Bensabat Amzalak was nonetheless unsuccessful. Portugal continued to trade with Nazi Germany throughout the conflict and may received payment for its exports in the form of gold looted in the Holocaust. In the final years of the war, the regime provided tacit support for a number of small-scale rescue operations including the issuance of 1,000 protective passports to Hungarian Jews by the diplomat Carlos de Liz-Texeira Branquinho in late 1944.

== Background ==
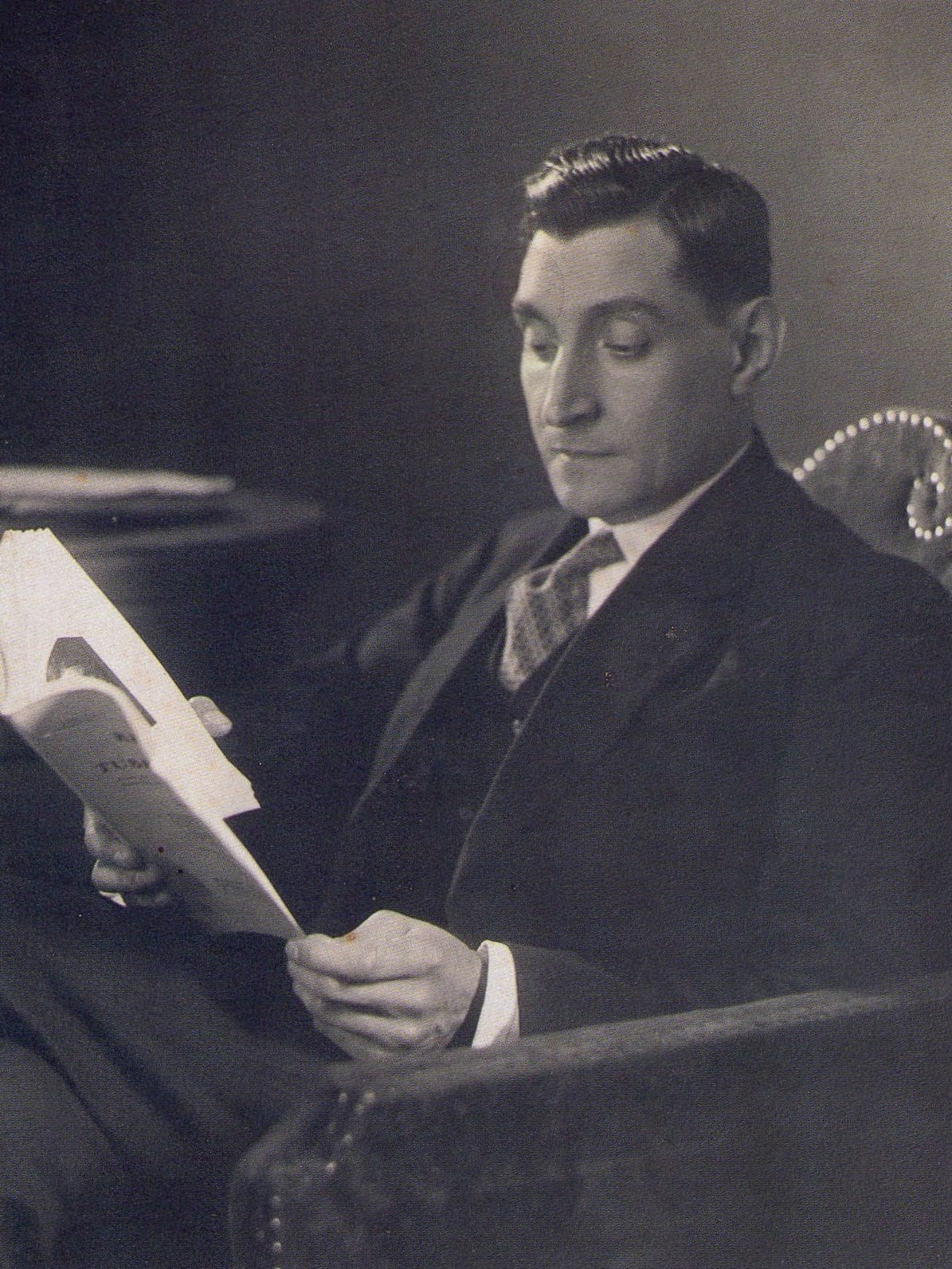
The Portuguese dictator António de Oliveira Salazar, pictured in 1940

Portugal's Jewish community remained tiny and did not exceed 1,000 before the war's outbreak. Portugal remained a poor and largely agrarian country throughout the period and, unlike many other Western European countries, did not experience any substantial immigration from German or Eastern European Jews during the Interwar Period. It was not invited to participate in the Évian Conference in 1938.

Portugal was ruled from 1933 by an authoritarian political regime known as the Estado Novo under the former university professor António de Oliveira Salazar. It remained neutral throughout World War II but was considered more sympathetic to the Allies than was Francoist Spain. Conservative and strongly influenced by Catholicism, the Estado Novo was unusual among contemporary dictatorships for not explicitly incorporating racial antisemitism into its own ideology. Salazar himself considered Nazi racial thinking to be inconsistent with Catholicism and Portuguese nationalism which he believed was not explicitly grounded in biological race. Due to government censorship of newspapers, the Portuguese public was ill-informed about the extent and nature of Nazi antisemitic policies.

The escalation of antisemitic persecutions in Eastern Europe, coupled with the rapid rise of Nazism in Germany, prompted the initial limited migration of Ashkenazi Jews to Portugal. These refugees swiftly assimilated into both Portuguese society and the local Jewish Community. By the 1930s, Portuguese Jewish citizens established the "Portuguese Commission for Assistance to Jewish Refugees in Portugal" (Comissão Portuguesa de Assistência aos Judeus Refugiados, COMASSIS) under the leadership of Augusto Isaac de Esaguy and having Adolfo Benarús as Honorary Chairman. COMASSIS provided refugees with medical and psychological care, and voiced their needs with the Portuguese government regarding residence and work permits. COMASSIS warranted renewals of doctors' and lawyers' work permits, and job contracts for professors at Portugal's universities. Additionally, COMASSIS also ran a community kitchen. D'Esaguy assumed the presidency of COMASSIS in 1938 and retained the role through to 1945.

== Refugees from German-occupied Europe ==
=== Refugee policy ===
France and Britain declared war on Germany following the German invasion of Poland in September 1939. With Europe at war, countries of all kinds, neutral and non neutral, felt they should close their borders to prevent fifth columnists and agitators infiltrating refugee groups. Given the absence of alternatives, the number of refugees trying to travel through Portugal increased substantially. Between September and December 1939, approximately 9,000 refugees entered Portugal. The Portuguese regime felt the need for tighter control. By 1939, the police had already dismantled several criminal networks responsible for passport forgery and several consuls were expelled from service for falsifying passports.

In September 1939 Augusto Isaac d’Esaguy helped more than 600 German Jews, that got trapped in Spain on their way to Cuba and Mexico, to pass through Portugal.

On 11 November 1939, the Portuguese government sent Circular 14 to its consuls in Europe outlining categories of refugees whom the Surveillance and State Defense Police (Polícia de Vigilância e de Defesa do Estado, PVDE) considered to be "inconvenient or dangerous". It imposed particular restrictions on "foreigners of indefinite or contested nationality, the Stateless, Russian citizens, holders of a Nansen passport, or Jews expelled from their countries" to whom visas should not be issued without prior approval from the foreign ministry.

Although overtly discriminatory, Neill Lochery argues that the Circular was motivated principally by economic considerations and that similar restrictions had been adopted in other neutral countries. Milgram expressed similar views, asserting that Portugal's regime did not distinguish between Jews and non-Jews but rather between wealthy and impoverished foreign Jews. He considers that Jews were prevented from settling in Portugal primarily because the regime feared foreign influence in general, and particularly the arrival of communists fleeing from Germany.

=== German invasion and occupation of France ===
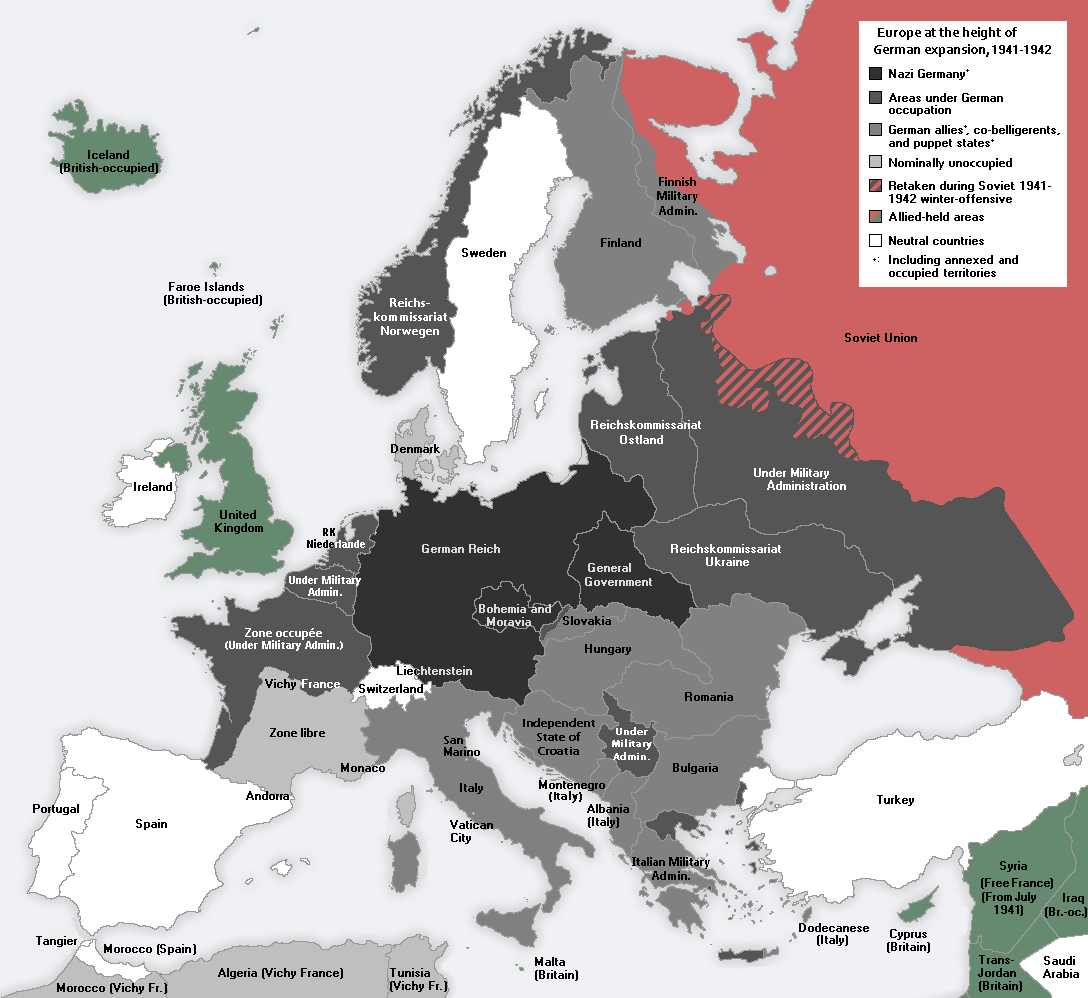
Portugal shown on a map of German-occupied Europe, c.1942

France was invaded and occupied in May and June 1940. Acting contrary to Circular 14, Aristides de Sousa Mendes, Portuguese consul at Bordeaux, issued thousands of transit visas to refugees on his own initiative. On 26 June 1940, four days after the French armistice, Salazar authorized the Hebrew Immigrant Aid Society (HIAS-HICEM) in Paris to transfer its main office to Lisbon. Initially this action by Salazar was taken against the will of the British Embassy in Lisbon. The British feared that this would make the Portuguese people less sympathetic with the allied cause. The American Jewish Joint Distribution Committee, World Jewish Congress, and Portuguese Jewish relief committees were also authorized to establish themselves in Lisbon amongst others.

The use of Portugal as an escape route became even more difficult when in June 1940 the United States further tightened its conditions for admitting refugees from German-occupied Europe. This created a problem for all those wanting to use Portugal as a transit country because it became virtually impossible to get a visa for the United States, leaving visas to Latin America as the only legal way out of Europe. Jewish refugees who succeeded in arriving in Portugal enjoyed a general sense of freedom and refugees caught without the correct papers were not deported to German-occupied Europe. Instead, they were held by police under house arrest until it was possible for them to leave Portugal.

In 1940 Augusto Isaac d’Esaguy together with Moisés Bensabat Amzalak played a decisive role on behalf of the Luxembourgish Jews whom the Germans deported from Luxembourg aboard the Zwangstransporte. Thanks to d’Esaguy's intervention, two of these groups were released from detention and made their way into Portugal in late 1940.

From January 1941, COMASSIS acted as a liaison for thousands of refugees who migrated from Nazi-occupied territories in sealed trains that connected Berlin with Lisbon. Trains arrived regularly with more than 50 persons each, COMASSIS provided accommodation to refugees in hotels and boarding-houses; helped them with their visas and acted with shipping companies and the Portuguese authorities on their behalf. Within the first three months of 1941, over 1,603 Jewish refugees passed through Lisbon in this way.

The number of refugees who passed through Portugal during the war has been estimated to range from a few hundred thousand to one million but Jews represented only a small proportion of this number. (Note: Neil Lochery estimates a high end number of one million.) Over the course of the entire war, it is thought that 60,000 to 80,000 Jewish refugees passed through Portugal.

== The Holocaust ==
=== Awareness and response to the Holocaust ===
From 1941, the Ministry of Foreign Affairs received information from its consuls in German-occupied Europe about the escalation of the persecution of Jews. It was also kept informed of revelations about the extermination of Jews which had been published in Allied countries from 1942. The historian Filipe Ribeiro de Meneses wrote:

Salazar's analysis of the European situation [...] was based on an old-fashioned brand of realpolitik which saw states and their leaders acting out of reasonable and quantifiable considerations. The murderous racial enterprise that drove the Third Reich appears to have bypassed Salazar, despite the information that must have been accessible to him (very little of which survives, however, in his archive). The Portuguese press, meanwhile, was prevented from reporting on the Final Solution as its details became known, and Salazar never made a pronouncement on the subject. The fate of Europe's Jewish population was not seen as an issue that affected the national interest...

After the German invasion of the Soviet Union, German officials became interested in preventing the flight of Jews from their occupied territories in Europe so that they could instead be captured and killed. In July 1942 the Reich Security Main Office asked German diplomats in Lisbon if it was possible to "prevent emigration from Portugal" as they had interest in "the seizure of the Jews...as part of the final solution for the Jewish question in Europe." In September the German consul in Lisbon advised the German Foreign Office that it was pointless to ask the Portuguese government to "extradite the Jews originating from Germany or territories occupied by Germany" and similarly it would be useless to try and accomplish the same through links between German and Portuguese security forces. An advisor at the German legation in Lisbon also wrote to the Foreign Office that the Portuguese viewed the movement of Jews through its territory as a humanitarian matter and that Portuguese authorities would reject extradition requests of German Jews, as they understood German law to declare the nationality of its Jews voided if they traveled abroad. The Portuguese authorities were unaware of these discussions.

=== Repatriation of Portuguese Jews ===
In February 1943, the Nazi authorities issued a repatriation ultimatum (Heimschaffungsaktion) informing the Portuguese Ministry of Foreign Affairs that Portuguese Jews, like those from other neutral states, would no longer enjoy protected status in German-occupied Europe and provided a time-window for their repatriation. In general, the Portuguese regime was usually willing to assist small numbers of Jews considered "Portuguese" but only protected a small proportion of those who claimed assistance. This included 137 Sephardic Jews of Portuguese descent from Vichy France in 1943 and 1944. 19 Portuguese Jews from Thessalonika in Axis-occupied Greece were repatriated to Portugal after already having been deported to Bergen-Belsen concentration camp after a persistent exchange of notes between Lisbon and Berlin. However, Irene Flunser Pimentel argues "Portugal fell very short of what it could have done, only saving a tiny part of those who were threatened to be killed by the Nazis, and knowing that was their fate" and noted that repatriation of Portuguese Jews from German-occupied Europe was dependent on "rigorous proof of their nationality".

Moisés Bensabat Amzalak, a leading Portuguese Jewish dignitary and regime loyalist, who had headed the Lisbon Jewish community since 1926, interceded with Salazar on behalf of the roughly 4,300 Portuguese-Sephardic Jews living in the German-occupied Netherlands. In March 1943, Salazar ordered the Portuguese Legation in Berlin to enquire whether the German authorities would permit these to be treated like Portuguese nationals who could still be evacuated. The Germans rejected the overture. The extermination of Jews in the Netherlands had already begun and continued into 1944. Only around 400 individuals within the Portuguese community survived the war.

In 1943, Amzalak together with Leite Pinto, under Salazar's supervision, put in place a rescue mission for European Jews. Francisco de Paula Leite Pinto, General Manager of the Beira Alta Railway, which operated the line from Figueira da Foz to the Spanish frontier, organized several trains that brought refugees from Berlin and other European cities to Portugal. Salazar had been persuaded to instruct consuls in territories under Nazi occupation to validate all passports held by Jews even though the documents were known to be far from reliable.

Following the German invasion of Hungary, previously a German ally, Salazar recalled the Portuguese ambassador and left Carlos de Liz-Texeira Branquinho as the chargé d'affaires. Branquinho issued protective passports to an estimated 1,000 Hungarian Jews with the approval of the Salazar regime in similar fashion to the Spanish and Swedish legations. Branquinho was finally recalled to Lisbon on 30 October 1944.

=== Portuguese-German trade ===
Portugal exported tungsten ore to Nazi Germany throughout the war. The metal, used for hardening steel used in armaments, was initially bought in escudos but Salazar later insisted that payment be made in gold amid concerns at the Banco de Portugal that the German regime was using forged currency. The American Office of Strategic Services estimated that Portugal received a total of 400 tons of gold from Germany, one of the largest sums of any of its trading partners. The British ambassador to Portugal, Ronald Campbell, told Salazar that much of the gold was of "disputed origin", but Salazar ignored this. In 1998 the United States alleged that much of the gold had been stolen from Holocaust victims by German authorities. In response, a commission of inquiry was established in 1999, led by Mario Soares. The inquiry concluded that Portugal had not known about the gold's origin at the time it was received and thus there were "no legal, political or moral reasons" for Portugal to reimburse Holocaust survivors.

== Post-war actions ==
In December 2019 Portugal joined the International Holocaust Remembrance Alliance. Portugal's first museum dedicated to the Holocaust was opened in Porto in February 2021.

== See also ==
- International response to the Holocaust
- Spain and the Holocaust
- Turkey and the Holocaust
- Portugal during World War II
- Augusto Isaac de Esaguy
