= Comassis =

Comassis (an acronym for Comissão Portuguesa de Assistência aos Judeus Refugiados, or Portuguese Commission for Assistance to Jewish Refugees) was a humanitarian organization based in Lisbon, Portugal, during World War II. Its mission was to assist Jewish refugees transiting through Portugal.

In the early 1930s the escalation of anti-Semitic persecutions in Eastern Europe, coupled with the rapid rise of Nazism in Germany, prompted the initial migration of Ashkenazi Jews to Portugal. These refugees swiftly assimilated into both Portuguese society and the local Israeli Community. The Portuguese Jewish citizens held a significant role by providing crucial support to Jewish refugees. Initially, they established the "Portuguese Commission for Assistance to Refugee-Jews in Portugal" (COMASSIS), under the leadership of Augusto Isaac de Esaguy and having Adolfo Benarús as Honorary Chairman.

In 1937 Adolfo Benarus published a book in which he applauded the lack of anti-Semitism in Portugal. The honorary president of the Jewish community of Lisbon, claimed that "happily in Portugal, modern anti-Semitism doesn't exist".

With the Anschluss of 1938, Portugal experienced an increased influx of refugees, and Adolf Benarus, the then president of COMASSIS who had turned 75 had to step down as president and it was Augusto d’Esaguy, who had been the committee’s Secretary-General since its foundation in 1933, that assumed the presidency, a role he kept through 1945.

== Activities ==
COMASSIS provided refugees with medical and psychological care, and voiced their needs with the Portuguese government and authorities regarding the issuance of residence and work permits. COMASSIS warranted renewals of doctors' and lawyers' work permits, and job contracts for professors at Portugal's universities. Additionally, COMASSIS also ran a community kitchen, provided medical aid, temporary housing, and legal assistance to refugees.

In September 1939, Esaguy helped facilitate the passage through Portugal of over 600 German Jews who had been stranded in Spain while attempting to reach destinations such as Cuba and Mexico.In 1940 Augusto d’Esaguy together with Moisés Bensabat Amzalak played a decisive role on behalf of the Luxembourgish Jews whom the Germans deported from Luxembourg aboard the Zwangstransporte. Thanks to d’Esaguy’s intervention, two of these groups were released from detention and made their way into Portugal in late 1940.

From January 1941, COMASSIS acted as a liaison for thousands of refugees who migrated from Nazi-occupied territories in sealed trains that connected Berlin with Lisbon. Trains arrived regularly with more than 50 persons each, COMASSIS provided accommodation to refugees in hotels and boarding-houses; helped them with their visas and acted with shipping companies and the Portuguese authorities on their behalf. Within the first three months of 1941, over 1,603 Jewish refugees passed through Lisbon in this way.

== Legacy ==
The 1940 annual report of HICEM (a major Jewish emigration aid organization) praised Esaguy’s “energetic activities” in helping refugees stranded in Portugal.

Comassis is remembered today as one of the most important Jewish-led humanitarian relief efforts in Portugal during the Second World War.

== See also ==
- Augusto Isaac de Esaguy
- Adolfo Benarús
- Portugal and the Holocaust
- Moisés Bensabat Amzalak
