= Spain and the Holocaust =

Francoist Spain remained officially neutral during World War II but maintained close political and economic ties to Nazi Germany and Fascist Italy throughout the period of the Holocaust. Before the war, Francisco Franco had taken power in Spain at the head of a coalition of fascist, monarchist, and conservative political factions in the Spanish Civil War (1936–1939) with the aid of German and Italian military support. He was personally sympathetic to aspects of Nazi ideology including its anti-communism and antisemitism. It appeared possible that Spain might enter into an alliance with the Axis powers in 1940 and 1941. In this period, Franco's regime compiled a register of Jews resident in Spain and added Jewish identity to its official identity documents. Other pre-existing anti-Jewish measures remained in force.The regime failed to protect the vast majority of Spanish Sephardic Jews living in German-occupied Europe, though it permitted 20,000 to 35,000 Jews to travel through Spain on transit visas from Vichy France. In the post-war years, the Franco regime cultivated the idea that it had acted to protect Jews across Europe as a means to improve diplomatic relations with the former Allied powers.

== Background ==
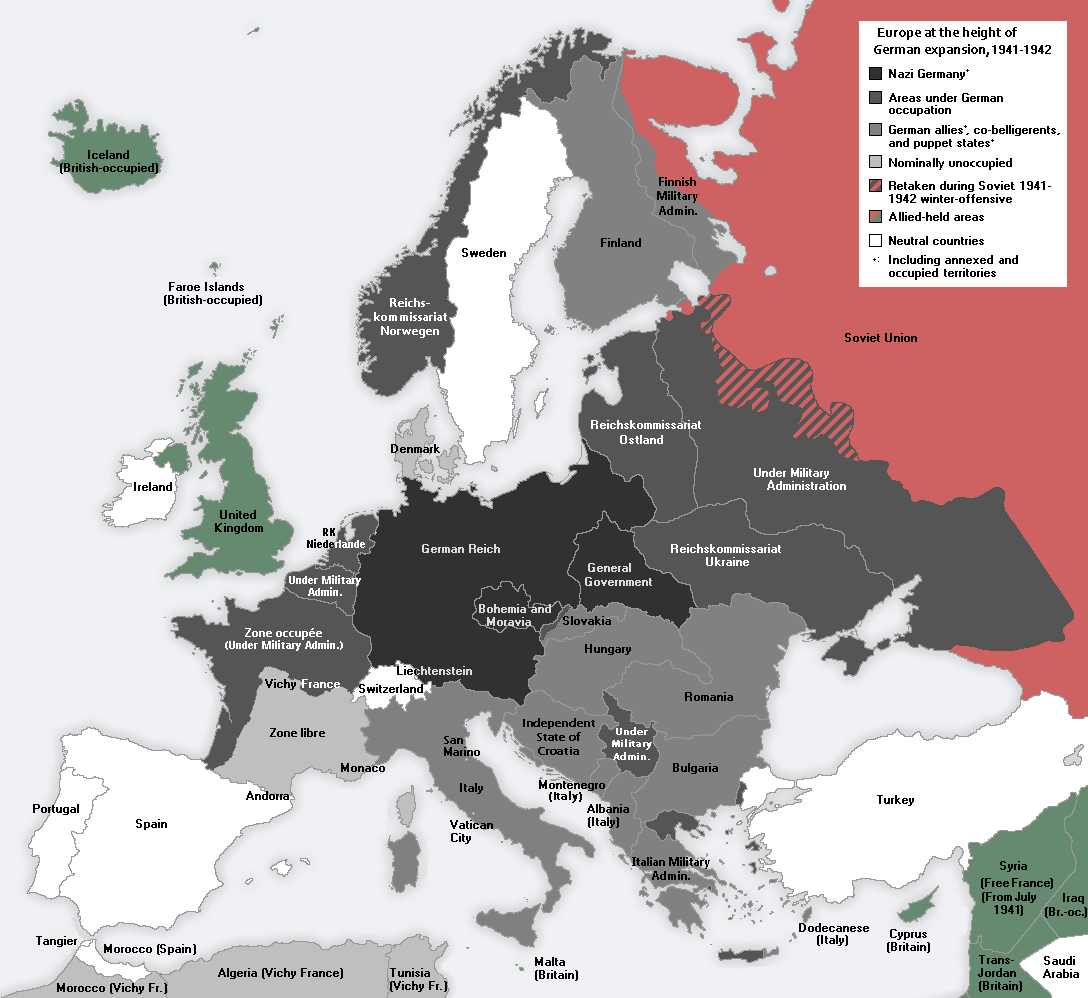
Spain shown on a map of German-occupied Europe, c.1942

Francisco Franco took power at the head of a coalition of fascist, monarchist, and conservative political factions in the Spanish Civil War (1936–1939) against the left-leaning Spanish government supported by communist and anarchist factions. He was actively supported by Nazi Germany and Fascist Italy during the Civil War and Franco sympathised with many aspects of Nazism, especially its anti-communism. There was a small community of Jews in Spain and a larger one in Spanish Morocco; however, the practical restrictions imposed in the aftermath of the Civil War made it increasingly hard for Jews to live in Spain.

Franco ensured that Spain was neutral at the start of World War II but seriously contemplated joining the Axis Powers as a German ally in the aftermath of the Fall of France in 1940. He met Adolf Hitler on 23–24 October 1940 but was unable to gain promises that Spain would gain colonial territories from France in North Africa because Hitler feared delegitimising the new Vichy regime in France. Spain ultimately remained neutral but maintained close economic and political relations with the Nazi regime to the end of the war.

== The Holocaust ==
=== Official policy ===
Paul Preston wrote that "[o]ne of Franco's central beliefs was the "Free masonic–Bolshevik conspiracy". He was convinced that Freemasonry was the ally of both American capitalism and Russian communism". That being said however; Jewish religious services, like Protestant services, had been forbidden since the Civil War. José Finat y Escrivá de Romaní, the Director of Security, ordered a list of Jews and foreigners in Spain to be compiled in May 1941. The same year, Jewish status was marked on Spanish identity papers for the first time.

The Franco regime was informed of atrocities on the Eastern Front by Spanish volunteers from the Blue Division, which fought as part of the German Army, who "observed the numerous murders of Jews and Polish and Russian civilians". The Blue Division occasionally provided temporary protection to Jews within its areas of control.

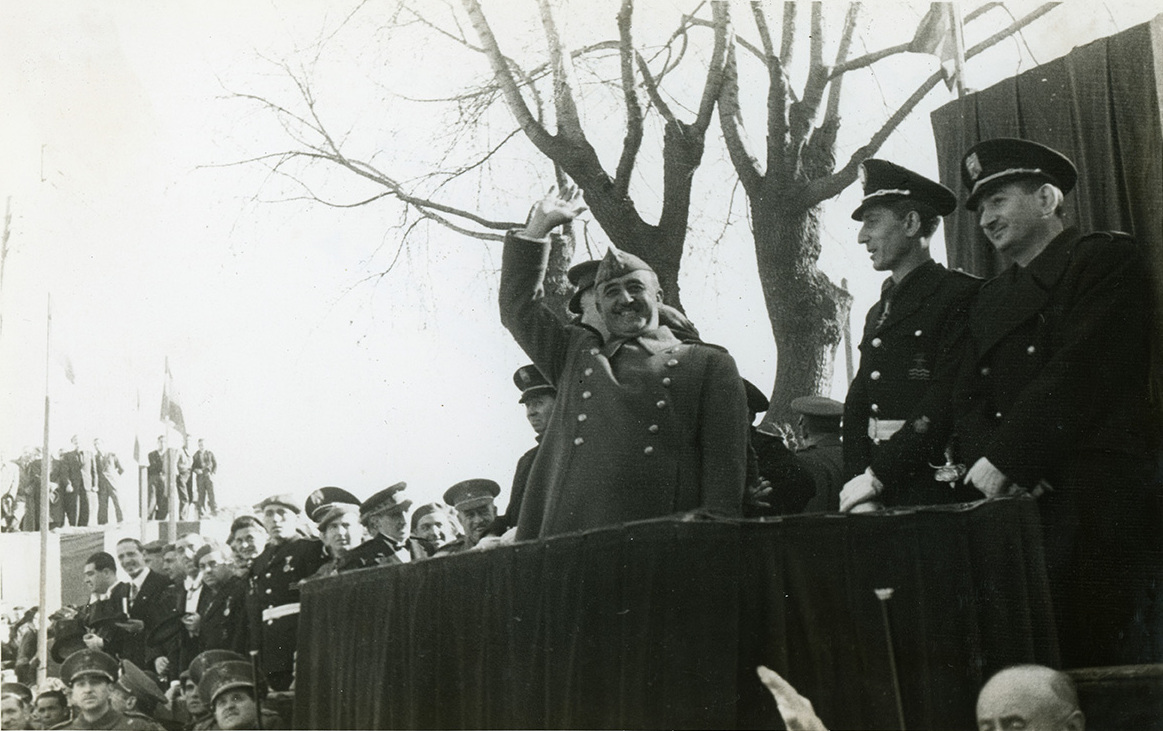
Spain's dictator Francisco Franco, pictured in 1942, believed in a "Jewish–masonic–Bolshevik conspiracy".

Historically, Spain had attempted to extend its influence over Sephardic Jews in other parts of Europe. A vague offer of citizenship to them had been made in 1924 under the dictatorship of Primo de Rivera, and many Sephardic Jews living in German-occupied Europe either held Spanish citizenship or protected status. The German occupation authorities issued a repatriation ultimatum (Heimschaffungsaktion) requiring neutral states to repatriate their Jewish citizens, and the Spanish government ultimately accepted 300 Spanish Jews from France and 1,357 from Greece but failed to intervene on behalf of the majority of Spanish Jews in German-occupied Europe. Michael Alpert writes that "to save these Jews would mean having to accept that they had the right to repatriation, to live as residents in Spain, or so it seems to have been feared in Madrid. While, on the one hand, the Spanish regime, as always inconsistently, issued instructions to its representatives to try to prevent the deportation of Jews, on the other, the Ministry of Foreign Affairs in Madrid allowed the Nazis and Vichy puppet government to apply anti-Jewish regulations to people whom Spain should have protected".

In addition, Spanish authorities permitted 20,000 to 35,000 Jews to travel through Spanish territory on transit visas from France. A smaller number of Jewish refugees were among the évadés escaping illegally into Spanish territory across the Pyrenees from France and other parts of Western Europe en route for Portugal or Gibraltar from where they traveled to the United Kingdom or United States.

=== Personal initiatives ===
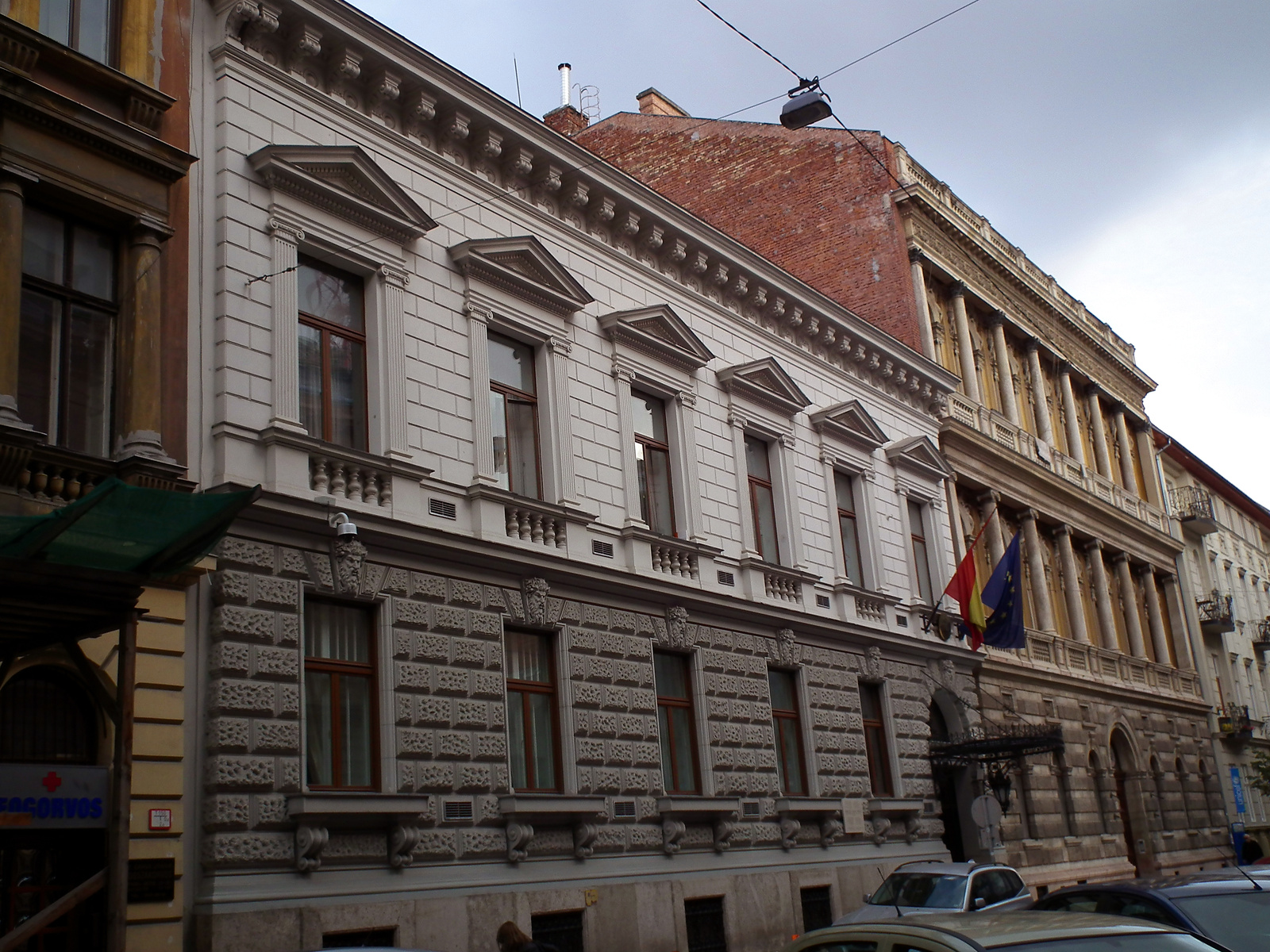
The Spanish Embassy in Budapest, Hungary where Ángel Sanz Briz was posted during the war

Eduardo Propper de Callejón, a Spanish diplomat, issued a number of visas and transit visas to French refugees at Bordeaux over three days in June 1940. He was married to a Jewish woman and apparently decided on his own initiative on the grounds that the Spanish Embassy should not be seen to be less generous than the local Portuguese consulate where Aristides de Sousa Mendes was issuing thousands of visas. It is not known exactly how many individuals received these documents, and the Franco regime destroyed official records at the time in an apparent attempt to cover up his actions; not all the recipients were Jews.

Ángel Sanz Briz, a Spanish diplomat in Hungary, protected several hundred Hungarian Jews in 1944. After he was ordered to withdraw from the country ahead of the Red Army's advance, he encouraged Giorgio Perlasca, an Italian businessman, to pose as the Spanish consul-general and continue his activities. In this way, 3,500 Jews are thought to have been saved. Stanley G. Payne described Sanz Briz's actions as "a notable humanitarian achievement by far the most outstanding of anyone in Spanish government during World War II" but comparing him with the Swedish consul Raoul Wallenberg, argued that Sanz Briz "might have accomplished even more had he received greater assistance from Madrid".

In total, nine Spaniards have been awarded the title of Righteous Among the Nations by the Israeli institute Yad Vashem.

== Post-war years ==
Preston writes that, in the post-war years, "a myth was carefully constructed to claim that Franco's regime had saved many Jews from extermination" as a means to deflect foreign criticism away from allegations of active collaboration with the Nazi regime. As early as 1943, the Ministry of Foreign Affairs concluded that the Allies were likely to win the war. José Félix de Lequerica y Erquiza became Foreign Minister in 1944 and soon developed an "obsession" with the importance of the "Jewish card" in relations with the former Allied powers. Spain was isolated diplomatically in the post-war years. After Israeli diplomat Abba Eban gave a speech condemning "the Spanish regime which welcomed, accepted, congratulated and upheld the prospect of Nazi supremacy in Europe and the world" and arguing against a proposal made by several Latin American countries which favoured the re-establishment of diplomatic relations with Spain, the Franco regime sponsored the publication of the pamphlet España y los Judíos (1949), which inaccurately depicted Franco as saving as many as 50,000 Jews from France and South-Eastern Europe. The escalation of the Cold War led to an improvement in Spain–United States relations in 1953 and Spain was subsequently admitted into the United Nations in 1955.

Michael Alpert notes that "this public relations effort of the Spanish regime was remarkably effective, even in the Jewish world itself". For example, the American rabbi Chaim Lipschitz who authored a study entitled Franco, Spain, the Jews and the Holocaust (1984) was "invited to Spain and provided with an official driver, hotel, and a suitable set of translated documents" although he remained relatively critical of Spanish policy. Spanish official archives were not made widely available to researchers until the aftermath of the Spanish transition to democracy in 1975. Spain became a member of the International Holocaust Remembrance Alliance in 2008.

== See also ==
- International response to the Holocaust
- Pope Pius XII and the Holocaust
- Portugal and the Holocaust
- Turkey and the Holocaust
- Mauthausen concentration camp, in which a large number of Spanish Republican exiles were held as political prisoners.
