= Oswald von Hoyningen-Huene =

German diplomat (1885–1963)

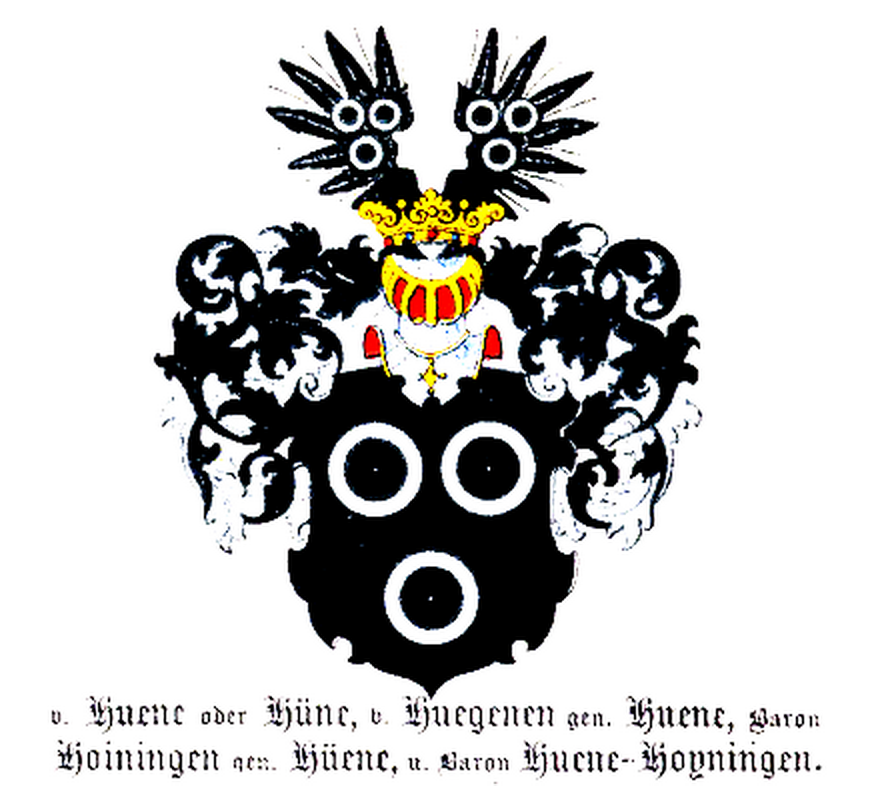

Oswald Theodor Freiherr von Hoyningen-Huene (born 29 July 1885 in Clarens, Switzerland; died on 26 August 1963 in Basel) was a German diplomat.

== Biography ==
Oswald von Hoyningen-Huene was German Ambassador to Portugal from 1934–1944. Half-English and never a member of the Nazi Party, he had been a member of Paul von Hindenburg's staff up to 1934.

Historian Neill Lochery describes Hoyningen-Huene as sharp, clever and diplomatically astute and says that he played a central role in Lisbon as the war developed, in particular in the delicate negotiations of tungsten supplies from Portugal to Germany.

While in Lisbon during the prewar period, Hoyningen-Huene developed close ties between Berlin and Lisbon. He studied Portuguese history and culture, and appealed to the nationalist sentiments of Salazar and other senior Portuguese personalities. He gave talks at the Universities of Lisbon and Coimbra on the past glories of the Portuguese Empire and positioned himself as a strong supporter of the culture and symbols of the Portuguese Estado Novo.

He developed ties with Portuguese elite, including the head of Lisbon's small permanent Jewish community, Moisés Bensabat Amzalak, and he managed to arrange for Amzalak to be awarded the medal of excellence from the German Red Cross, a German civil assistance organization.

After the war, Salazar allowed Hoyningen-Huene to settle permanently in the Lisbon area, where he lived out part of his retirement.

== Sources ==
- Lochery, Neill (2011). Lisbon: War in the Shadows of the City of Light, 1939–1945. United States: Public Affairs; 1 edition. p. 345. ISBN 9781586488796.
