= Briz =

Briz may refer to:

- Ángel Sanz Briz, Spanish diplomat
- Briz-M, Russian orbit insertion booster stage
