= Heimschaffungsaktion =

The Repatriation Ultimatum (German: Heimschaffungsaktion, lit. 'returning home action') refers to a series of diplomatic ultimatums issued by Nazi Germany in 1942-43 in relation to Jews from certain other Axis and neutral states living in German-occupied Europe. Those not "returned home" (Heimschaffung) would be "included in the general measures regarding Jews". Foreign responses to the ultimatum are widely studied as part of research on the international response to the Holocaust.

Before the ultimatums had been issued, foreign Jews had occasionally been detained in mass round-ups of Jews in 1941 provoking protests from a number of foreign governments about breaches of international law. Most individuals had ultimately been released and were exempted from antisemitic measures such as forced wearing of the yellow badge. German officials feared that further detention could lead to reprisals against German interests abroad. The ultimatum effectively offered foreign governments a chance to accept the forced removal of Jews from German-occupied Europe or to disclaim their rights. When a country failed to expatriate its nationals, the German authorities requested a written declaration that the government in question was "not interested in the fate of the other Jews considered by the Germans as their citizens". As the historian Corry Guttstadt has observed, "[t]his was, in effect, effect, a German demand for a "declaration of consent" for the deportation of these Jews" and their ultimate murder.

The first ultimatums were sent to states allied with Nazi Germany and were limited to their citizens living in German-occupied France. Romania and Bulgaria received the first ultimatums in September 1942 and provided their consent to the application of the "general measures" prescribed. Ultimatums were issued later the same month to Italy and Hungary. Finland, a co-belligerent, received an ultimatum in early 1943 as did Denmark which had remained notionally independent despite being under German occupation since April 1940. Switzerland and Turkey, both neutral states, received also repatriation ultimatums in September 1942. Spain, Portugal, Sweden, and several Latin American countries also received repatriation ultimatums in early 1943. It was widened to include Jews in all of German-occupied Western and Central Europe in May 1943 and later to Axis-occupied Greece.

Most countries took little or no action to repatriate Jews who were subsequently killed. Approximately 100 Argentine Jews, for example, are believed to have been exterminated during the Holocaust after Argentine diplomats in Paris and Berlin refused their repatriation.
