= Turkey in World War II =

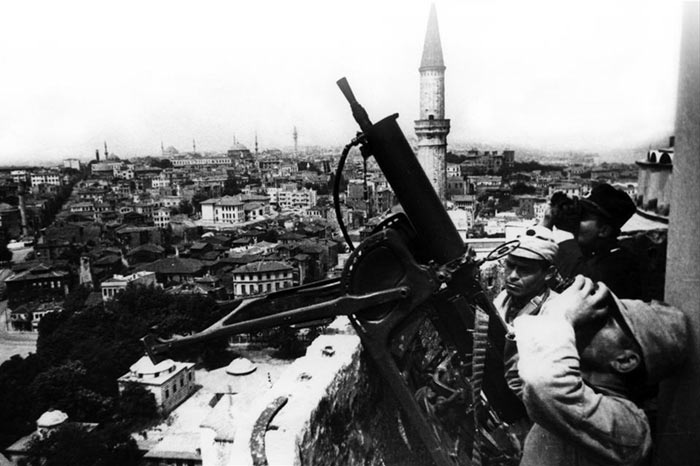
An MG 08 machine gun unit deployed on a minaret of Hagia Sophia for air defense purposes (September 1941).

Concerned about the occupations of Czechoslovakia and Albania prior to World War II, the Turkish government issued a joint declaration with Britain and France in 1939. An alliance was established between Turkey and these two states in Ankara on October 19, 1939. Under this agreement, the three states pledged mutual assistance in the event of a war in the Mediterranean. The terms also included provisions for military and material aid. Turkey began expanding the Çakmak Line defending Istanbul, and discussions over receiving British and French war materiel began; eventually 200 Valentine tanks were received from the UK.

However, during the war, Turkey did not actively participate in the conflict, citing the factor of Soviet Russia. On March 25, 1941, a declaration announcing a state of non-aggression between Turkey and Soviet Russia was issued. That same year, the Balkans Campaign began while the German-Soviet Non-Aggression Pact between Nazi Germany and Soviet Russia was still in effect. Despite pressure from the Allies—who raised the possibility of an invasion—Turkey did not enter the conflict, and diplomatic relations were cultivated through the German ambassador, Von Papen. The German-Turkish Friendship Pact was signed on June 18, 1941.

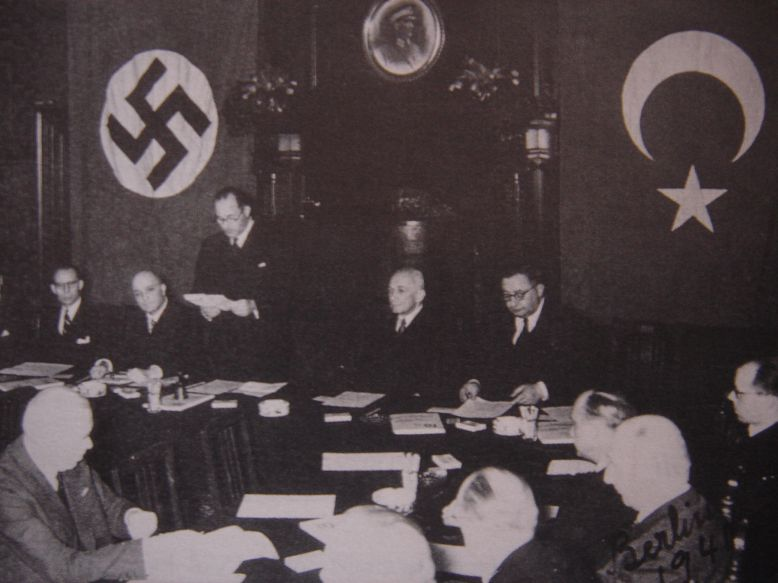
German–Turkish Treaty of Friendship

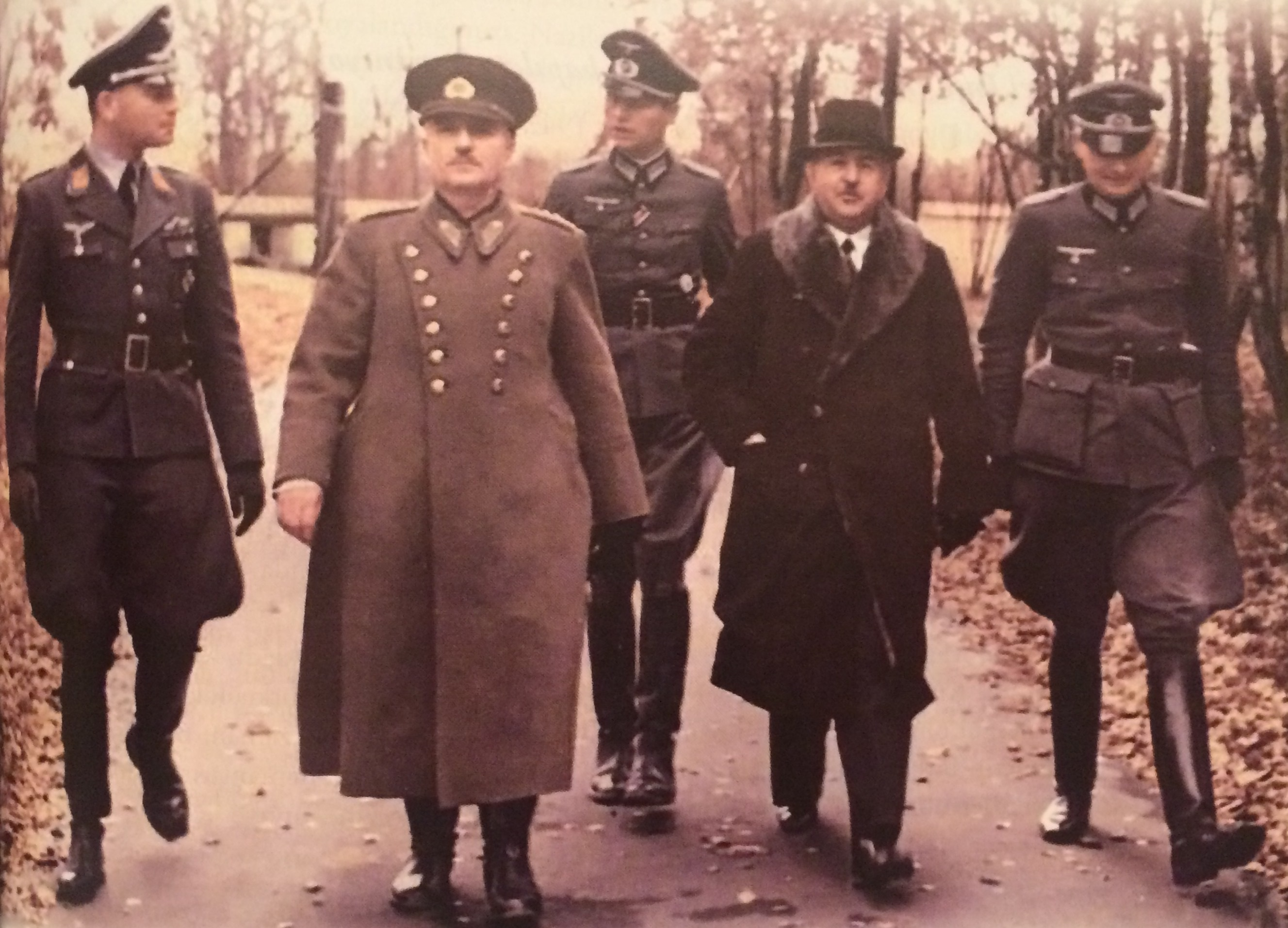
Erkilet and Erden on the Eastern Front, October 31, 1941

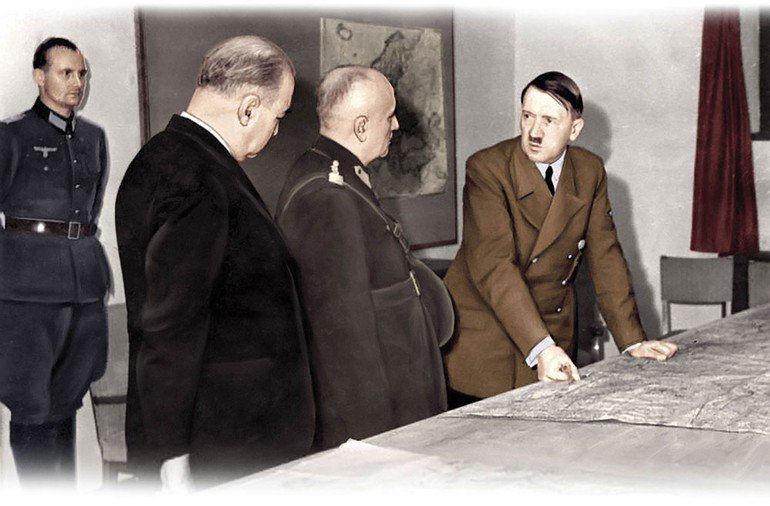
General Hüseyin H. Emir Erkilet and General Ali Fuat Erden meeting with Adolf Hitler at the Wolfsschanze in October 1941

At the same time, Turkey sold 90,000 tons of chromium ore to Germany; in return, Germany was to meet Turkey's need for weapons and vehicles. Operation Barbarossa began four days after the pact was signed; on July 12, 1941, a joint action agreement was signed between Britain and Soviet Russia. Following this operation, German foreign minister Ribbentrop began pressuring Turkey—through the ambassador—to allow the transport of German forces across Turkish territory to the Caucasus and Iraq, pledging that if this request were granted, certain territories in the Balkans and an island in the Aegean would be ceded to Turkey. Despite pressure from both sides, Turkey did not enter the war; during this period, Germany lost the Battle of Stalingrad, and Turkey's policy of balancing the powers continued. Despite non-aggression pacts signed with both sides, Turkey remained cautious; for instance, the neighbouring country of Iran was subjected to a joint Soviet-British invasion in August 1941 despite having a non-aggression pact, and similarly, Germany had attacked Soviet Russia less than two years after signing a non-aggression pact with it.

The Casablanca Conference was held on January 14, 1943, with the participation of Allied heads of state; it was decided at the conference to strengthen Turkey and bring it into the war. The objective was to strike the oil wells in Romania, an ally of Nazi Germany. Turkey reacted negatively to the fact that, following the conference, the US preferred to conduct diplomatic and material dealings through Britain. Churchill, who envisioned opening a new front in the Balkans, arrived in Adana on January 30, 1943, to secure Turkey's support for the Allies on this front. During the "Adana Conference," actually held inside a train carriage at the Yenice station, located 23 kilometers outside Adana—Churchill's demands were rejected on the grounds of mistrust toward the Soviets and the Turkish army's lack of adequate equipment. To avoid undermining relations with Germany, which maintained a presence in the region, it was publicly announced via the press that Turkey would not alter its foreign policy. Although Allied pressure persisted after 1943, Turkey continued its balancing policy for some time; however, the Allies' growing military superiority influenced Turkish-German relations, and chrome shipments to Germany were halted on April 20, 1944. The Allies had stated that they would impose an embargo if the shipments were not stopped. Germany's response was to issue a diplomatic note through its ambassador. In August 1944, the Kingdom of Bulgaria withdrew from the war and the Soviet army entered the country; in parallel with these developments, Turkey announced that it was severing all ties with Germany and Japan.

Due to the condition set by the Allies for United Nations membership, Turkey declared war on Germany and Japan on February 23, 1945. No Turkish soldiers fought in combat, however.

The number of fatalities among units of the Turkish Army between the outbreak of World War II on September 1, 1939, and its conclusion on May 7, 1945, was announced in 1951 by Minister of National Defense Hulûsi Köymen. The Turkish army lost an average of 13 soldiers per day, totaling 22,663 soldiers.

During the war, Turkey changed various policies due to its inclination to avoid entering the conflict, and the war's socioeconomic effects were felt within the country. Despite demands from both the Axis and Allied powers, Turkey stopped short of actual military participation, limiting its involvement to a formal declaration of war on February 23, 1945. Factors such as providing aid to Greece, caring for refugees seeking asylum in Turkey, maintaining a mobilized army, and the severe disruption of foreign trade led to shortages and high prices. This resulted in measures such as the Wealth Tax and the rationing of bread. As a result of the war, imports fell by approximately 1,000,000 tons and exports by 1,800,000 tons between 1938 and 1945. Despite population growth in the country, agricultural production declined by 3,000,000 tons between 1938 and 1945, led to further economic measures; agricultural, livestock, and forest products held by citizens were partially confiscated. In a speech delivered on November 11, 1942, the prime minister of the time, Şükrü Saraçoğlu, stated that the rationale was to safeguard the army and the country. Black market activities increased in tandem with the scarcity in the country; the government's response was to impose severe penalties, extending even to the death penalty. Epidemic diseases linked to malnutrition emerged.

During this period, ideological stances in the Turkish press shifted according to the course of the war; for instance, after Saraçoğlu sought press support for the Capital Tax in 1942, newspapers and magazines published reports and cartoons accusing non-Muslims of theft and fraud. While the Capital Tax was a topical issue, the president of the time, İsmet İnönü, stated: "There is certainly a way to remedy the evident harm caused to the homeland by these people—numbering no more than a few hundred. We must not grant any individual or group the right to rob the nation under the pretext of the freedom of trade and economic activity." Newspapers were also shut down during this period; in 1942, five different newspapers were closed for durations ranging from 1 to 60 days. In 1945, the Soviet Union's unilateral termination of the Turkish-Soviet Non-Aggression Pact became a major topic of public discussion; the Tan newspaper, which advocated for friendship with the Soviet Union, drew backlash, and consequently, on December 4, 1945, the Tan newspaper—along with several bookstores—was raided by university students.

== See also ==
- Military history of Turkey
- Romania in World War II
- Bulgaria in World War II
