= Augusto Isaac de Esaguy =

Portuguese medical historian

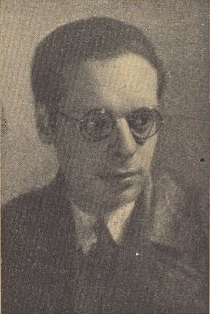

Augusto Isaac d’Esaguy (Faro, Portugal 1899 - 1961) was a Portuguese medical historian who headed the Portuguese Committee of Assistance to Jewish Refugees (Commisao Portuguesa de Assistencia aos Judeos Refugiados, "COMASSIS"), a Relief Committee for the German and Polish Refugees, established in 1933, that played a crucial role in helping Jewish refugees during World War II.

== Biography ==
Augusto Isaac d’Esaguy was born in Faro, Portugal, in 1899. son of Isaac Augusto d’Esaguy and Raquel Toledano Bensimom. At a very young age, while studying medicine, he became a journalist. In 1918, he served as a Secretary to the Minister of Foreign Affairs, Prof. António Egas Moniz. Augusto d’Esaguy graduated in Lisbon 1926 and became a lecturer in history of medicine. Later he specialized in dermatology in Paris.

In 1933 his cultural and literary contributions, mainly on the history of Portuguese-Jewish physicians, gained him the title ‘‘OSE,’’ Military Order of Saint James of the Sword (Portuguese: Ordem Militar de Sant'Iago da Espada) a Portuguese order of chivalry. The National Library in Lisbon has more than 100 bibliographic entries in his name.

With the Anschluss of 1938, Portugal experienced an increased influx of refugees, and Adolf Benarus, the then president of COMASSIS who had turned 75, had to step down as president. Augusto d’Esaguy, who had been the committee's Secretary-General since its foundation in 1933, that assumed the presidency, a role he kept through 1945.

COMASSIS provided refugees with medical and psychological care, and voiced their needs with the Portuguese government and authorities regarding the issuance of residence and work permits. COMASSIS warranted renewals of doctors' and lawyers' work permits, and job contracts for professors at Portugal's universities. Additionally, COMASSIS also ran a community kitchen.

When the war broke out in September 1939 d’Esaguy helped more than 600 German Jews, who had been trapped in Spain en route to Cuba and Mexico, to pass through Portugal.

In 1940 Augusto d’Esaguy together with Moisés Bensabat Amzalak played a decisive role on behalf of the Luxembourgish Jews whom the Germans deported from Luxembourg aboard the Zwangstransporte. Thanks to d’Esaguy's intervention, two of these groups were released from detention and made their way into Portugal in late 1940.

From January 1941, COMASSIS acted as a liaison for thousands of refugees who migrated from Nazi-occupied territories in sealed trains that connected Berlin with Lisbon. Trains arrived regularly with more than 50 persons each, COMASSIS provided accommodation to refugees in hotels and boarding-houses; helped them with their visas and acted with shipping companies and the Portuguese authorities on their behalf. Within the first three months of 1941, over 1,603 Jewish refugees passed through Lisbon in this way.

The HICEM's 1940 report paid a homage to d’Esaguy for his "energetic" activities to alleviate de distress of the Jews stranded in Portugal.

== Sources ==
- Milgram, Avraham (2011). Portugal, Salazar, and the Jews. Yad Vashem. p. 324. ISBN 9789653083875.
- Ohry, Avi; Nunes, Maria de Fátima (2021). "A forgotten Jewish-Portuguese historian of medicine: Dr. Augusto Isaac d'Esaguy, OSE, 1899–1961". Journal of Medical Biography. 29 (2): 60–63. doi:10.1177/0967772018800805. hdl:10174/24742. PMID 30734628. S2CID 73435043.
