= Ángel Sanz Briz =

Spanish diplomat and humanitarian (1910–1980)

Ángel Sanz-Briz
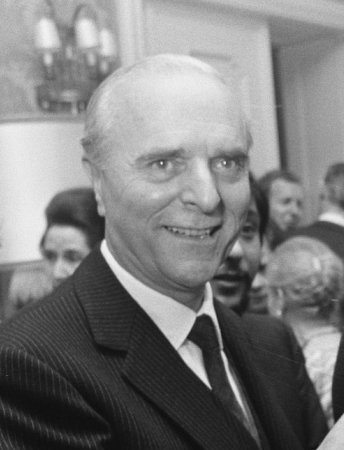
- Born: 28 September 1910; Zaragoza, Spain
- Died: 11 June 1980 (aged 69); Rome, Italy
- Resting place: Cemetery of Torrero, Zaragoza, Spain
- Education: Central University; Diplomatic School of Spain
- Occupation: Diplomat
- Spouse: Adela Quijano y Secades (m. 1942)
- Children: 4

Ángel Sanz-Briz (28 September 1910 – 11 June 1980) was a Spanish diplomat and humanitarian. Sanz-Briz is credited with saving more than 5,200 Jews in German-occupied Hungary from the Holocaust in the later stages of World War II.

For his actions, Sanz-Briz has been referred to as "the Angel of Budapest" and the "Spanish Schindler".

== Early life ==
Sanz-Briz was born on 28 September 1910 in Zaragoza, the youngest of four sons and one daughter of Felipe Sanz, a merchant, and Pilar Briz. He attended the Colegio Escuelas Pías in Zaragoza, then earned a degree in law at the Complutense University of Madrid.

In 1942, he married Adela Quijano y Secades, with whom he had five children.

== Diplomatic career ==
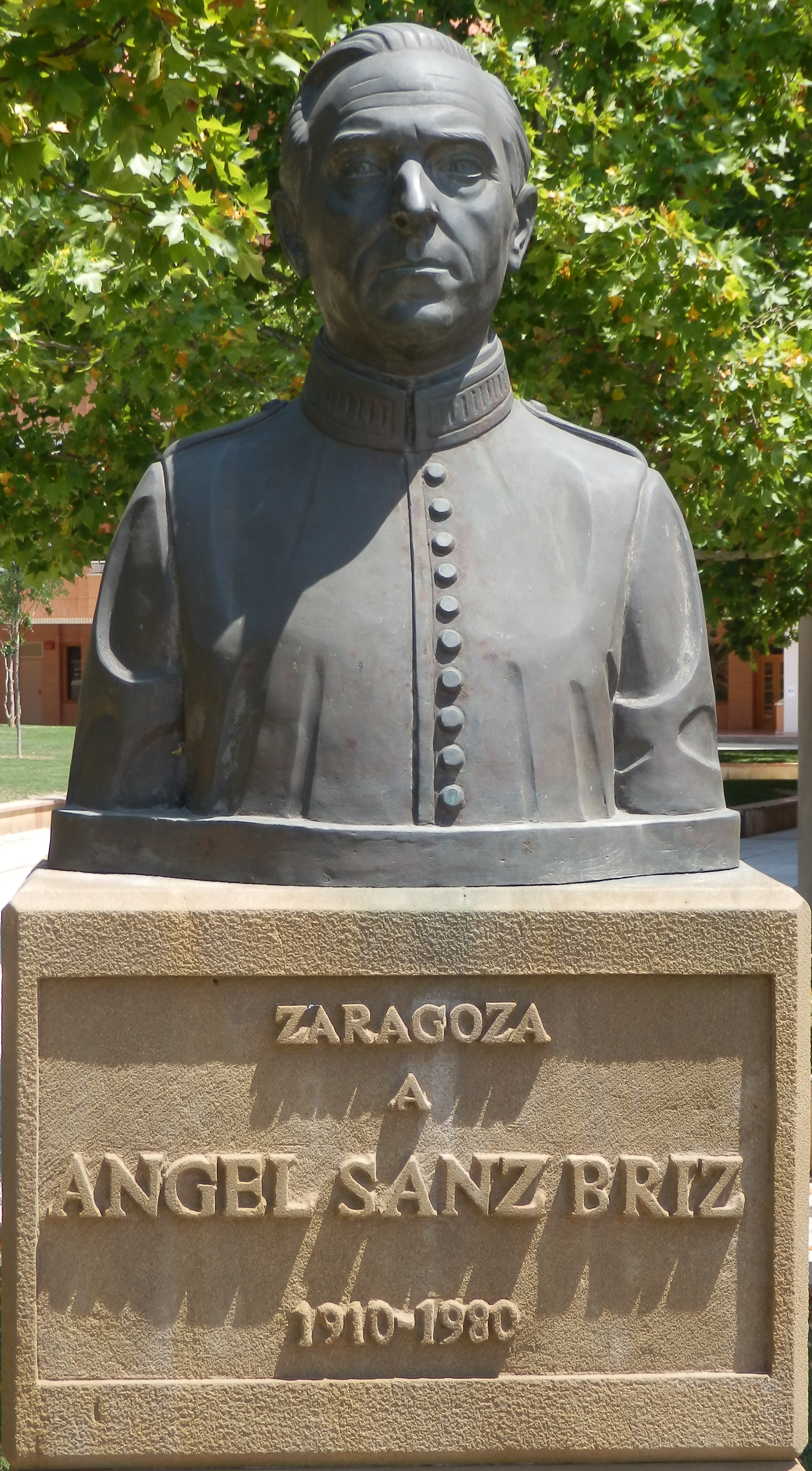
Memorial in Zaragoza, Spain

Sanz Briz began his diplomatic career with the Spanish Foreign Ministry in 1933. His first diplomatic posting was to Cairo, Egypt.

At the beginning of the Spanish Civil War, Sanz volunteered for the Nationalists in opposition to the socialist government of Francisco Largo Caballero. Sanz served as a truck driver in the Cuerpo de Ejército Marroquí, a unit of Francisco Franco's army created in 1937 and commanded by General Juan Yagüe. Unknowingly, Sanz was part of the same side of the Italian Giorgio Perlasca, who would be his main partner during World War II in Budapest.

On 1 April 1937, almost a year after the start of the Civil War, he was fired by the government of the Second Spanish Republic. However, he was reinstated on 19 August 1938.

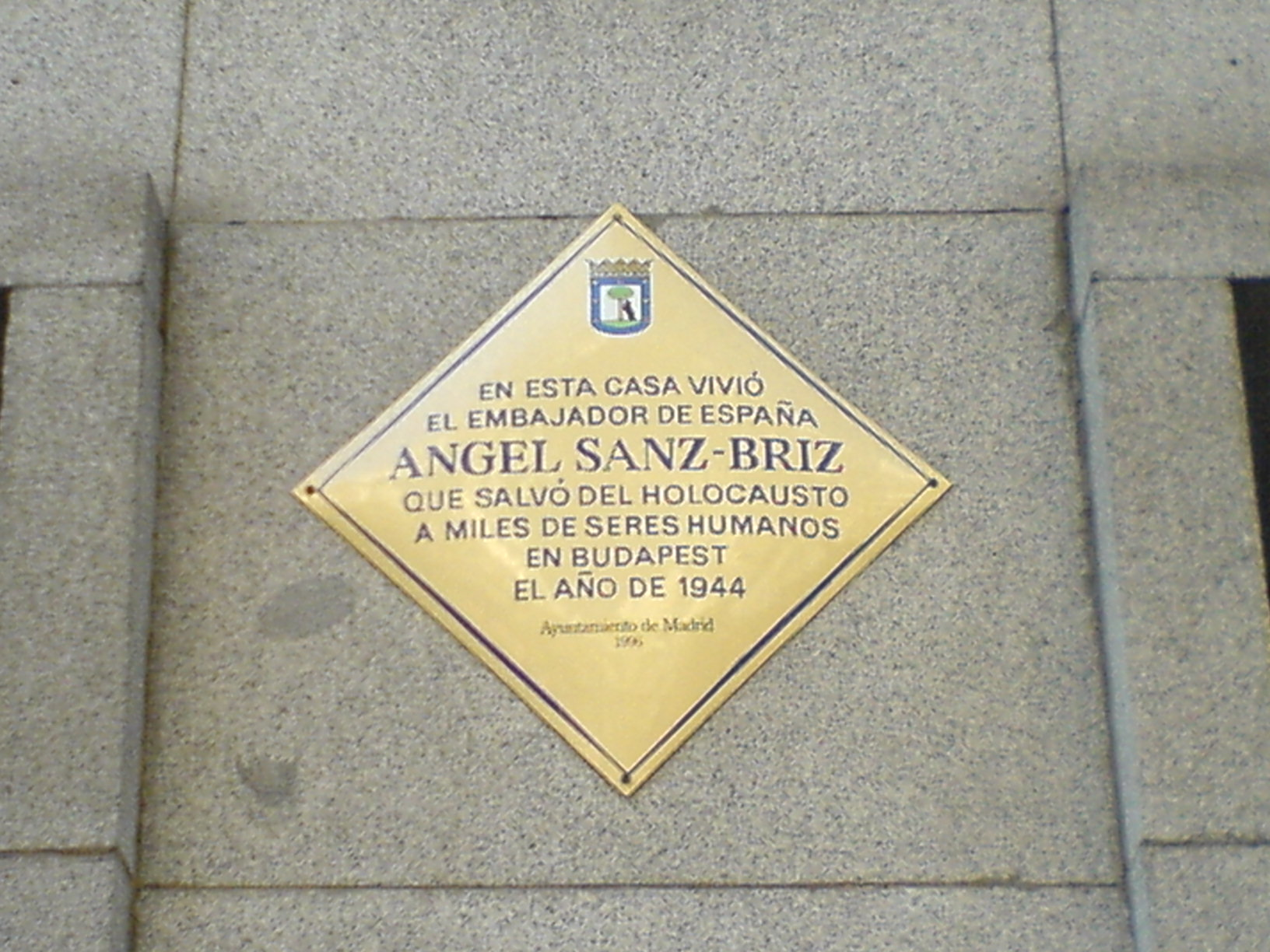
Ángel Sanz Briz memorial in Madrid. In this house lived the ambassador of Spain, Ángel Sanz Briz, who saved thousands of human beings from the Holocaust in Budapest in 1944.

== Actions in Hungary ==
Sanz-Briz began his posting as the first secretary at the Spanish Embassy in Budapest, Hungary, in 1942.

In the summer of 1944, Sanz-Briz was appointed the embassy's chargé d'affaires. Shortly after the persecution of Hungarian Jews began, he offered on behalf of the Spanish government to provide passports to Jews of Spanish origin, and to negotiate for their protection. He was authorised by his superiors to extend these rights to 200 Jews; however, Sanz-Briz extended his efforts to 200 Jewish families instead.

He lied to the Hungarian authorities and said that Spain, under the dictator Miguel Primo de Rivera, had given Spanish citizenship to descendants of Sephardic Jews expelled from Spain in 1492. Primo de Rivera had issued such a decree on 20 December 1924 but it had been canceled in 1930, a fact the Hungarian authorities were not aware of. Sanz Briz dutifully informed the Spanish Foreign Ministry of his actions, that were deliberately permitted by Madrid through administrative silence, a typical diplomatic procedure used to not compromise the chancellery.

In addition, Sanz-Briz rented buildings and apartments around Budapest at his own expense to shelter for the Jews to whom he had issued papers. He placed Spanish flags at these locations, which survivors referred to as the "Spanish houses" and posted notices indicating that they were offshore properties belonging to the Spanish embassy.

Between June and December 1944, according to Giorgio Perlasca, he and his assistants issued fake Spanish papers to 5,200 Jews, saving them from deportation to concentration camps.

The Spanish government ordered Sanz to leave Hungary in December 1944. In 1944, as the Red Army approached Budapest, he followed government orders to leave for Switzerland. He was replaced by the Italian Giorgio Perlasca, who pretended to be a Spanish consul and continued to issue Spanish visas and to patrol the safehouse system for Jews set up by Sanz Briz.

== Post-war and later life ==
After the war, Sanz-Briz continued his diplomatic career, with much of his actions during the war unknown, even to his family. He was posted to San Francisco and Washington, D.C., Ambassador to Lima, Bern, Bayonne, Guatemala, The Hague, Brussels and China (1973, where he became the first Spanish Ambassador). In 1976 he was sent to Rome as Ambassador of Spain to the Holy See, where he died on 11 June 1980.

Sanz Briz himself tells how he was able to save the lives of so many Jews, in Federico Ysart's book Los judíos en España (1973). He is also the subject of the 2011 Spanish television series El ángel de Budapest, based on Diego Carcedo's book Un español frente al Holocausto ("A Spaniard against the Holocaust").

== Recognition and legacy ==
On 8 October 1966, Yad Vashem recognized Ángel Sanz-Briz as a Righteous Among the Nations.

In 1991, he was recognized by the Holocaust Museum Yad Vashem of the State of Israel, who gave his family the title of Righteous Among the Nations. In 1994 the Government of Hungary gave him the Cross of the Order of Merit of the Republic of Hungary.

In 2015, a street in Óbuda-Békásmegyer in Budapest was renamed Angel Sanz Briz Avenue. Sanz-Briz was also honored with a statue.

Sanz Briz has been caught up in modern Spain's debate about the legacy of Francoist Spain and the regime's actions during the Holocaust. In 2023, Committee on Culture and Sports in the Spanish Senate rejected a proposal by far-right party Vox to commemorate Sanz Briz. Vox argued that Sanz Briz acted with the knowledge and direction of the Franco-led Ministry of Foreign Affairs. Left-wing parties, however, accused Vox of attempting to "whitewash Francoism" by associating Sanz Briz's actions with the Franco regime.

== See also ==
- Francoist Spain and the Holocaust
- Raoul Wallenberg, Swedish diplomat who also saved thousands of Jews in German-occupied Hungary
