= Adolfo Benarús =

Portuguese professor and painter (1863–1958)

Adolfo Benarus (March 20, 1863, Angra do Heroísmo – November 24, 1958, Lisbon) was a Portuguese professor, painter, and publicist. He was born in Angra do Heroísmo and relocated to Lisbon with his family at the age of 2. Benarús attended the Escola Superior de Letras and the Escola de Belas Artes in Lisbon. He studied under Benjamin Constant and Léon Bonnat at the Paris School of Painting and participated in exhibitions in Paris and Lisbon.

As an educator, Benarus authored didactic works focused on English language instruction. He contributed to the Arquivo Nacional and translated several works, demonstrating a strong commitment to exploring various facets of Hebrew life. Benarús was actively involved in communal affairs and held the honorary presidency of Lisbon's Jewish community.

Benarús played a significant role in assisting Jewish refugees during his lifetime. He was involved in the establishment and operation of the "Portuguese Commission for Assistance to Refugee-Jews in Portugal" (COMASSIS). This organization, established in 1933, directed by Augusto Isaac de Esaguy, aimed to provide aid and support to Jewish refugees during World War II.

== Selected works ==
- (1912a) Short Direct English Method. Lisbon, Liv. Ferreira.
- (1912b) A Short English Grammar. Lisbon, Liv. Ferreira.
- (1920) Lessons in English: Compendium. Lisbon, Ed. Francisco Franco.
- (1924) Israel, Various Notes. Lisbon, Of. do Museu Comercial de Lisboa.
- (1927) The Jews: The Unusual History of This People Until Our Days. Lisbon, Imp. Portugal-Brasil.
- (1937) The Tragedy of History: 1841 to 1937 - Dramatic Episodes. Lisbon, Liv. Sá da Costa.
- (1948) Anti-Semitism.

== Sources ==
- "Adolfo Benarús". Enciclopédia Açoriana (in Portuguese). Governo dos Açores.
- Milgram, Avraham (2011). Portugal, Salazar, and the Jews. Jerusalem: Yad Vashem. ISBN 9789653083875.
- Milgram, Avraham (1999). "Portugal, the Consuls, and the Jewish Refugees, 1938-1941" (PDF). XXVII. Shoah Resource Center (International School for Holocaust Studies): 123–156.
- Mucznik, Esther. "Escola Israelita – Efeméride". Comunidade Israelita de Lisboa.
