= Filipe Ribeiro de Meneses =

Portuguese historian

Filipe Ribeiro De Meneses
- Born: 1969 (age 56–57); Lisbon, Portugal
- Occupation: Professor
- Awards: MRIA

Academic background
- Education: Trinity College Dublin
- Thesis: The failure of the Portuguese First Republic : an analysis of wartime political mobilization (1996)
- Doctoral advisor: John Horne

Academic work
- Discipline: History
- Sub-discipline: Portuguese and Spanish History
- Institutions: Maynooth University
- Website: https://www.maynoothuniversity.ie/people/filipe-ribeiro-de-meneses

Filipe Ribeiro de Meneses (born 1969) is a Portuguese historian, who has lived in Ireland since he was young. He is a professor in Maynooth University, whose historiographical production is predominantly centered around the contemporary history of Portugal.

He graduated with a B.A. in history and philosophy in 1992 and received his doctorate in 1997, both from Trinity College Dublin. His doctoral thesis dealt with the governments of the Sacred União and Sidónio Pais. In 2017 he was elected a member of the Royal Irish Academy.

== Works ==
- (2001). Franco and the Spanish Civil War. Londres y Nueva York: Routledge.
- (2004). Portugal 1914–1926. From the First World War to Military Dictatorship. Bristol: Hispanic, Portuguese and Latin American Monographs.
- (2010). Salazar: A Political Biography. Nueva York: Enigma Books.
- (2015). A Grande Guerra de Afonso Costa. Lisboa: Publicações Dom Quixote.
