= Moisés Bensabat Amzalak =

Portuguese scholar and economist (1892–1978)

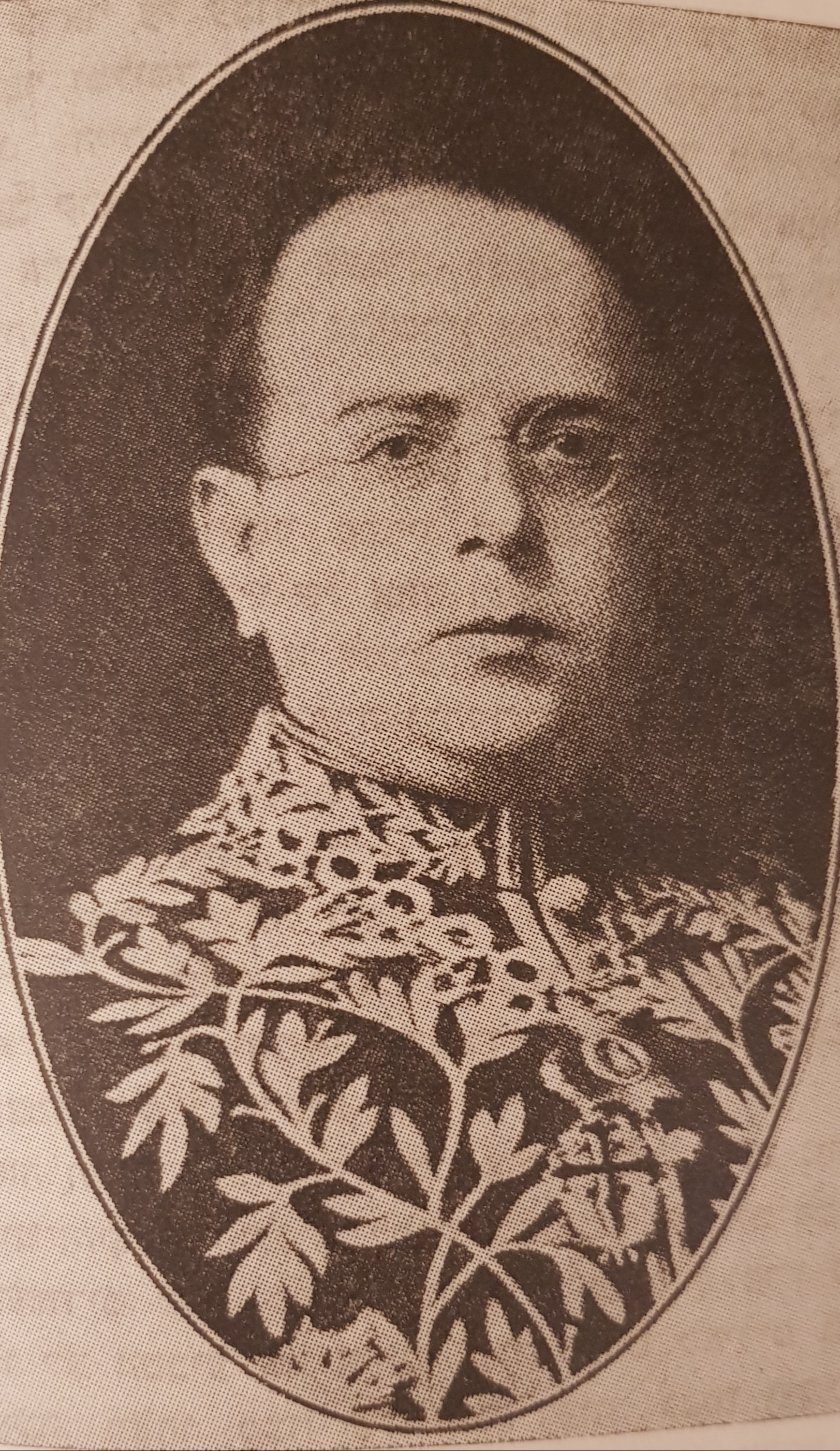
Moisés Bensabat Amzalak

Moisés Bensabat Amzalak (4 October 1892 – 6 June 1978) was a Portuguese scholar and economist. Amzalak was born and educated in Lisbon. He combined a successful business career with broad academic activity. A devoted Jew, a central figure in the Portuguese Jewish Community, he headed the Lisbon Jewish community from 1926 until his death in 1978.

== Biography ==
Amzalak established a solid academic career. He became professor of philosophy and later dean of the Lisbon Institute of Higher Economics and Finance (1933–1944), and was president of the Sciences Academy of Lisbon and deputy rector of the Technical University of Lisbon (1944–1956) and rector from 1956 until his retirement in 1962.

His main interests were economic history, history of economic thought, and marketing. He published extensively in his areas of expertise but also published several works on Judaism. Amzalak received the Honorary Doctorate from several universities, including the University of Bordeaux in 1935 and the prestigious Sorbonne, Paris, in 1950.

Amazalak was a public figure of great influence. He co-owned the newspaper O Século, then one of the major daily newspapers in Portugal. He was a close friend and a supporter of Portuguese dictator António de Oliveira Salazar. Avraham Milgram says that Amzalak "holds a place of honor on the consciousness of the Lisbon Jews."

== Saving of Jews ad pre-war relations with Germany ==
In 2007, journalist Antonio Louça, a revolutionary socialist militant published a book where he questioned why Amzalak allowed his newspaper to help the Nazi propaganda machine before World War II. In that book Louça also stated that in January 1935, Amzalak hosted the German ambassador, Baron von Hoyningen-Huene, and the latter subsequently recommended to his superiors that Amzalak be awarded the medal of excellence from the German Red Cross, a German civil assistance organization. In response, Esther Mucznik, one of the leaders of the Jewish Community of Lisbon, defended Amzalak's reputation. Mucznik pointed out the notable work done by Amzalak during the war and also observed that Amzalak's actions in 1935–1937 cannot properly be judged in light of what we know today about the Holocaust.

Yad Vashem Historian Avraham Milgram remarks that, before the war Amzalak, just like Pope Pius XII, regarded Germany as bulwark against communism and that he misread the Nazi regime in respect to the Jews just as Pius XII did. As the war approached, and from 1938 on, Amzalak changed this view and throughout the war, he made a major effort to assist the refugees.

Portuguese researcher Jose Freire Antunes in his book Jews in Portugal, Testimony of Fifty Men and Women credited Amzalak for the expansion of the refugee relief in Lisbon and for the transfer of JDC offices to Lisbon. It was due to the intervention of Augusto Isaac de Esaguy and Amzalak that many of the refugees with visas issued by Aristides de Sousa Mendes were allowed to continue on their way to Portugal.

The Portuguese ruler António de Oliveira Salazar held Amzalak in high esteem and that allowed Amzalak to play an important role in getting Salazar's permission to transfer from Paris to Lisbon the main HIAS-HICEM (Jewish relief organization) European Office in June 1940. Later in the war, Amzalak, together with Francisco de Paula Leite Pinto, General Manager of the Beira Alta Railway, which operated the line from Figueira da Foz to the Spanish frontier, organized several trains that brought refugees from Berlin and other European cities. Amzalak was also able to persuade Salazar to instruct consuls in territories under Nazi occupation to validate all passports held by Jews even though these documents were known to be far from "kosher".

== Sources ==
- "The Jew with a Nazi Medal."
- Gallagher, Tom (2020). Salazar: The Dictator Who Refused To Die. C Hurst & Co Publishers Ltd. ISBN 978-1-78738-388-3.
- Gallagher, Tom (2021). Salazar: O Ditador Que Se Recusa a Morrer (in Portuguese). D Quixote. ISBN 9789722071772.
- Goldstein, Israel (1984). My World as a Jew: The Memoirs of Israel Goldstein. Associated University Presses. p. 413. ISBN 9780845347805.
- Lochery, Neill (2011). Lisbon: War in the Shadows of the City of Light, 1939–1945. United States: PublicAffairs; 1 edition. p. 345. ISBN 9781586488796.
- Milgram, Avraham (2011). Portugal, Salazar, and the Jews. Yad Vashem. p. 324. ISBN 9789653083875.
- OLIVEIRA, Jaime da Costa. «Fotobiografia de Francisco de Paula Leite Pinto». No centenário do nascimento de Francisco de Paula Leite Pinto, Memória 2, Lisboa, Sociedade de Geografia de Lisboa, 2003 Testimonial from Professor Baltasar Rebelo de Sousa
- Pimentel, Irene; Ninhos, Claudia (2013). Salazar, Portugal e o Holocausto (in Portuguese). Lisbon. p. 908. ISBN 9789896442217.
- Pimentel, Irene (2006). Judeus em Portugal Durante a II Guerra Mundial (in Portuguese). Lisbon: A Esfera do Livros. ISBN 9789896261054.
- Pinto, Jaime Nogueira, «Salazar visto pelos seus próximos», Testimonial from Francisco de Paula Leite Pinto, ISBN 972-25-0567-X, 1993 Bertrand Editora S.A
- Saraiva, José Hermano (20 July 2012). "Recorde a grande entrevista de José Hermano Saraiva ao SOL (2ª parte)". Sol (in Portuguese). Lisbon.
