= Jewish Archive (Francoist Spain) =

Documents compiled inSpain in the 1940s

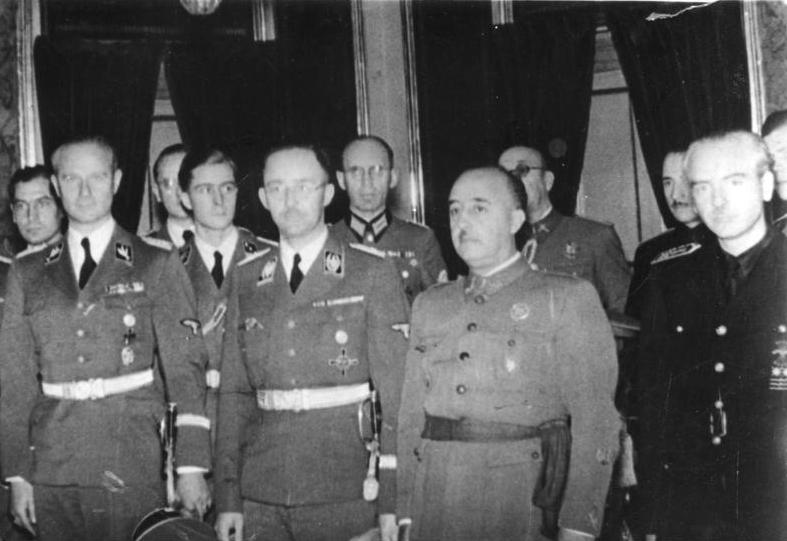
From left to right at the front: Karl Wolff, Heinrich Himmler, Francisco Franco and Ramón Serrano Suñer, October 1940.

The Jewish Archive (Archivo Judaico) was the name given to a collection of documents compiled by the regime of Francisco Franco in Spain during the Second World War. In accordance with instructions of the Directorate of General Security (Dirección General de Seguridad, DGS) the provincial governors of Spain assembled records of all Jews who lived in Spain, whether or not they were Spanish. Jorge Martínez Reverte has suggested that the resulting list, which recorded 6,000 Jews living in Spain, was handed to Heinrich Himmler's SS in 1941 and was included in Adolf Eichmann's Jewish Population Census, tabled at the Wannsee Conference, chaired by Reinhard Heydrich, in January 1942.

== Prewar ==
As soon as the Spanish Civil War had ended, the Franco regime enacted legislation like the Law for the Suppression of Freemasonry and Communism of 1940, which legalised repressive actions against those who had supported the Spanish Republic since October 1934. Jews were not included, as according to Álvarez Chillida, the Alhambra Decree of 1492 had already neutralised the "Jewish threat" by its expulsion, and since it remained in force, there was no need for further legislation against the Jews. Otherwise, anti-Semitic rhetoric was present in statements made by Franco as well as his supporters and ideological allies since the late 1920s. Although the regime officially rejected racial anti-Semitism as contradictory to its National Catholic principles, but in practice, it was tolerated. On January 25, 1938, General Gonzalo Quiepo de Llano imposed a fine of 138,000 pesetas on the Jewish community of Seville 18 months after his forces took over the region. In one of his nightly radio broadcasts, he had accused the Jews of Spain of spending trillions of pesetas on the "promotion of Communism and the preparation of revolutions" by their tithes to the "supreme council, known as the Kahal". A department store founded by Jewish refugees in Zaragoza was also closed down and confiscated. In early 1939, one year after Franco's Directorate of General Security formally began police cooperation with the German Gestapo and before the military conflict came to an end, agents of the Gestapo raided the synagogue in Barcelona and committed a number of desecrations. The local authorities refused a hearing to the Jewish community, and German Jewish refugees who called on the German consulate general were also arrested.

== Wartime ==
By 1940, a "Jewish department" was established, alongside the "Freemasonry department", under the direction of Eduardo Comín Colomer. Both were incorporated into the anti-Marxism section of the Directorate of General Security, headed by José Finat y Escrivá de Romaní, Count of Mayalde. Mayalde was "a representative of the fascistised Catholic Right who previously held the post of national delegate for information and investigation in the Falange and was very close to the cuñadísimo Ramón Serrano Suñer".

Furthermore, a so-called "Special Brigade" was created, at whose head Mayalde named the virulent anti-Semitic Mauricio Carlavilla. Its primary objective was to monitor Jews living in Spain as requested by Heinrich Himmler, Reichsfuhrer-SS and Chief of German Police in Nazi Germany. Mayalde had met Himmler in Berlin in September 1940, along with other senior SS personnel, including the Reich Security Main Office head, Reinhard Heydrich, and the Ordnungspolizei head, Kurt Daluege. The next month, Himmler visited Spain, where he met with Franco as well as Mayalde and Serrano Suner. It was on that occasion that Himmler expressed his variance with the way the Falange treated political enemies as racial enemies. Further arrangements were made for the exchange of exiled Republicans to Spain for persons wanted by Germany.

The Jewish Archive was compiled covertly by the "Special Brigade" and consisted of police records provided by the provincial governors on "activities of Jewish character" that occurred in their jurisdictions. According to José Luis Rodríguez Jiménez, the Spanish police were usually able to hand over to Germany wanted persons. That collaboration came to a halt, as the tide of the Second World War changed.

In May 1941, Mayalde stepped down as Director of General Security to take up the post as Spanish Ambassador to Berlin. Mayalde had issued the following circular to the provincial governors on May 5, his final day in the former post:

...[envíen a la central informes individuales de] los israelitas nacionales y extranjeros afincados en esa provincia (...) indicando su filiación personal y político-social, medios de vida, actividades comerciales, situación actual, grado de peligrosidad y conceptuación policial.... Las personas objeto de la medida que le encomiendo han de ser principalmente aquellas de origen español designadas con el nombre de sefardíes, puesto que por su adaptación al ambiente y similitud con nuestro temperamento poseen mayores garantías de ocultar su origen y hasta pasar desapercibidas sin posibilidad alguna de coartar el alcance de fáciles manejos perturbadores.

The Archivo Judaico came about as a result, the abbreviation AJ appearing in the records. One of them concerned a woman in Barcelona with no known political affiliation: "Se le supone la peligrosidad propia de la raza judía (sefardita)". The word "Jew" would be written in red ink on permits.

== Jewish victims ==
Spanish Jews who fell foul of Francoist legislation against Freemasonry and sympathy for the Spanish Republic included José Bleiberg, who committed suicide before being detained, as well as the president of the Jewish community of Barcelona. Bleiberg's sons Alberto and Germán spent 4 years in jail. In the case of the poet Jorge Guillén, the authorities emphasised a Judeo-Bolshevik charge for his marriage to the Sephardic writer Germaine Cahen. The file read that "es judío, habiendo escrito varios libros y folletos en defensa del judaísmo. Es amigo del aventurero JOSÉ ESTRUGO, dirigente del Socorro Rojo Internacional (he is a Jew, having written several books and pamphlets in defense of Judaism. He is a friend of the adventurer Jose Estrugo, leader of the International Red Aid)", and so he was denied a "carnet de periodista" necessary for his work. The Xueta people, though not officially targeted, received anonymous threats like "La Falange sabrá expulsar a la ralea judía (The Falange know how to expel the Jewish rabble)".

Towards the end of the war, the Jewish Archive, along with other materials that suggested knowledge of the "probable final destination of the Spanish Jews", was destroyed as the Franco regime sought to downplay its collaboration with the Axis powers to the United Nations and to emphasise its supposed role during the war in the ferrying of Jews through Spain from occupied Europe.

== Sources ==
- Álvarez Chillida, Gonzalo (2002). El Antisemitismo en España. La imagen del judío (1812-2002). Madrid: Marcial Pons. ISBN 978-84-95379-49-8.
- Israel Garzón, Jacobo. "El archivo judaico del franquismo", en Raíces: Revista judía de cultura, ISSN 0212-6753, Nº 33, 1997, pags. 57-60.
- Israel Garzón, Jacobo (2007). Espana y El Holocausto (1939-1945): Historia y Testimonios. Madrid: Federacion de Comunidades Judias de Espana. ISBN 978-8461148097.
- Pérez, Joseph (2009). Los judíos en España. Madrid: Marcial Pons. ISBN 978-84-96467-03-3.
- Payne, Stanley (2008). Franco and Hitler. Yale University Press. ISBN 978-0300151220.
- Martín de Pozuelo, Eduardo (2010). El Franquismo, complice del holocausto. Barcelona: Libros de Vanguardia. ISBN 978-8496642713.
- Martín de Pozuelo, Eduardo (2007). Los secretos del franquismo. Barcelona: Libros de Vanguardia. ISBN 978-8496642270.
- Preston, Paul (2012). The Spanish Holocaust: Inquisition and Extermination in Twentieth Century Spain. London: Harper Press. ISBN 978-0-00-255634-7.
- Preston, Paul (1994). Franco: A Biography. London: Fontana Press. ISBN 978-0006862109.
- Rodríguez Jiménez, José Luis (2007). "El antisemitismo en el franquismo y en la transición". In Gonzalo Álvarez Chillida & Ricardo Izquierdo Benito (eds.). El antisemitismo en España. Cuenca: Ediciones de la Universidad de Castilla-La Mancha. ISBN 978-84-8427-471-1.
- Rohr, Isabelle (2008). The Spanish Right and the Jews, 1898–1945: Antisemitism and Opportunism. Sussex Academic Press. ISBN 978-1-84519-182-5.
