= Neill Lochery =

Scottish author and historian

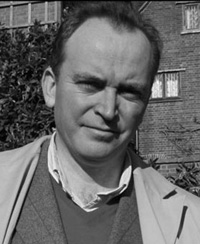
- Born: 1965 (age 60–61)
- Occupations: Professor, historian, writer

Neill Lochery (born 1965) is a Scottish author and historian on the modern history of Europe and the Mediterranean Middle East. He is a frequent contributor to newspapers. Lochery is Professor of Middle Eastern and Mediterranean Studies at University College London.

== Author ==
Some of Lochery's books focus on Portugal and on World War II. Lisbon: War in the Shadows in the City of Light, 1939-1945, for example, recounts the role the Portuguese capital, Lisbon, played during World War II. The book is set within the context of a country that was trying to hold on to its self-proclaimed wartime neutrality but was increasingly caught in the middle of the economic, and naval, wars between the Allies and the Axis. In 2017, he published Out of the Shadows: Portugal from Revolution to the Present Day, which provides an account of Portugal's first 40 years of democracy, which began with the 25 April Revolution in 1974. In 2020, Lochery released Porto: Gateway to the World. In Brazil: The Fortunes of War, World War II and the Making of Modern Brazil, Lochery writes that the statecraft and economic opportunism of Brazil's leaders, under the dictatorship of Getúlio Vargas, transformed it into a regional superpower.

Lochery has additionally produced a series of books on the Middle East: The Resistible Rise of Benjamin Netanyahu (2016), Loaded Dice (2007), The View from the Fence (2005), Why Blame Israel? (2004), The Difficult Road to Peace (1999) and The Israeli Labour Party (1997). The View from the Fence, was shortlisted for the 2006 Jewish Quarterly Wingate Prize.

== Academic career ==
Lochery has an MA from Exeter University, and a PhD from Durham University (Centre for Middle Eastern and Islamic Studies).

He joined University College London in 1997 and is Professor of Middle Eastern and Mediterranean Studies in the faculty of Arts & Humanities.

He has served as an advisor to politicians and companies. He has op-ed and commentary articles published in The Wall Street Journal, The National Post (Canada) and the Jerusalem Post.

== Bibliography ==
=== Author ===
- Cashing Out: The Flight of Nazi Treasure. New York: PublicAffiars, Hachette 2023. ISBN 978-1-5417-0230-1
- Porto: Gateway to the World. London: Bloomsbury, 2020. ISBN 978-1-4482-1792-2
- Out of the Shadows: Portugal from Revolution to the Present Day. London: Bloomsbury Books, 2017. ISBN 978-1-4729-3420-8
- Benjamin Netanyahu. London: Bloomsbury Books, 2016. ISBN 978-1-4729-2611-1
- Brazil: The Fortunes of War, World War II and the Making of Modern Brazil. New York: Basic Books, 2014. ISBN 978-0-465-03998-2 - (Foreign language publication in Brazil and Portugal)
- In To The Shadows; Portugal 1933-1974 (Lisboa: A Cidade Vista de Fora, 1933-1974). Editorial Presenca, 2013. ISBN 978-972-23-5164-5
- Lisbon: War in the Shadows of the City of Light, 1939-1945. New York: Public Affairs, 2011. ISBN 978-1-58648-879-6 - (Foreign language publication in Australia, New Zealand, Brazil, Poland, Portugal, Spain and Latin America as well as an award-winning audio release)
- Loaded Dice: The Foreign Office and Israel. London and New York: Continuum (Bloomsbury), 2007. ISBN 978-08264-9056-8
- The View From The Fence. London and New York: Continuum (Bloomsbury), 2005. ISBN 0-8264-8679-7
- Why Blame Israel? The Facts Behind the Headlines. Cambridge: Icon Books, 2004. ISBN 1-84046-530-1
- The Difficult Road to Peace. Netanyahu, Israel and the Middle East Peace Process. Reading: Ithaca Press, 1999. ISBN 0-86372-248-2
- The Israeli Labour Party: In the Shadow of the Likud. Reading: Ithaca Press, 1997. ISBN 0-86372-217-2

=== Contributions ===
- World Powers: Diplomatic Alliances and International Relations beyond the Middle East: "Israel and Britain: Tipping the Scales of Balance". Shindler, C. (ed.). London and New York. IB Tauris, 2014. ISBN 978-1-84885-780-3
- The Middle East: Modern Controversies: "Creating a Palestinian State Would Not Resolve the Israeli-Palestinian Conflict". Ojeda, A. (ed.). Farmington Hills, MI: Greenhaven Press, 2003. ISBN 0-7377-1584-7
