= Turkey and the Holocaust =

Aspect of World War II

Prior to joining the Allied Powers late in the war, Turkey was officially neutral in World War II. Despite its neutrality, Turkey maintained strong diplomatic relations with Nazi Germany during the period of the Holocaust. During the war, Turkey denaturalized 3,000 to 5,000 Jews living abroad; between 2,200 and 2,500 Turkish Jews were deported to extermination camps such as Auschwitz and Sobibor; and several hundred confined in Nazi concentration camps. When Nazi Germany encouraged neutral countries to repatriate their Jewish diaspora, Turkish diplomats received instructions to avoid repatriating Jews even if they could prove their Turkish nationality. Turkey was also the only neutral country in Europe to implement racist laws during the war. Between 1940 and 1944, around 13,000 Jews passed through Turkey from Europe to Mandatory Palestine. According to the research of historian Rıfat Bali, more Turkish Jews suffered as a result of discriminatory policies during the war than were saved by Turkey. Since the war, Turkey and parts of the Turkish Jewish community have promoted exaggerated claims of rescuing Jews, using this myth to promote Armenian genocide denial.

== Background ==
Until 1950, Turkey was a one-party state that operated under a strongly nationalist government that prioritized Turkification of the country and establishing a Turkish-Muslim bourgeoisie at the expense of religious and ethnic minorities. Although many Jews were initially favorably disposed towards Turkey, during the first two decades of Turkey's existence, half to a third of its Jewish population left. "Push" factors included a ban on Jewish associations and restrictions and public censure on the use of non-Turkish languages such as Judeo-Spanish as part of the "Citizen, speak Turkish" campaign, as well as dismissal of state employees deemed not to be "Turks" due to a 1926 law. The 1934 Thrace pogroms ethnically cleansed Jews from European Turkey.

== History ==
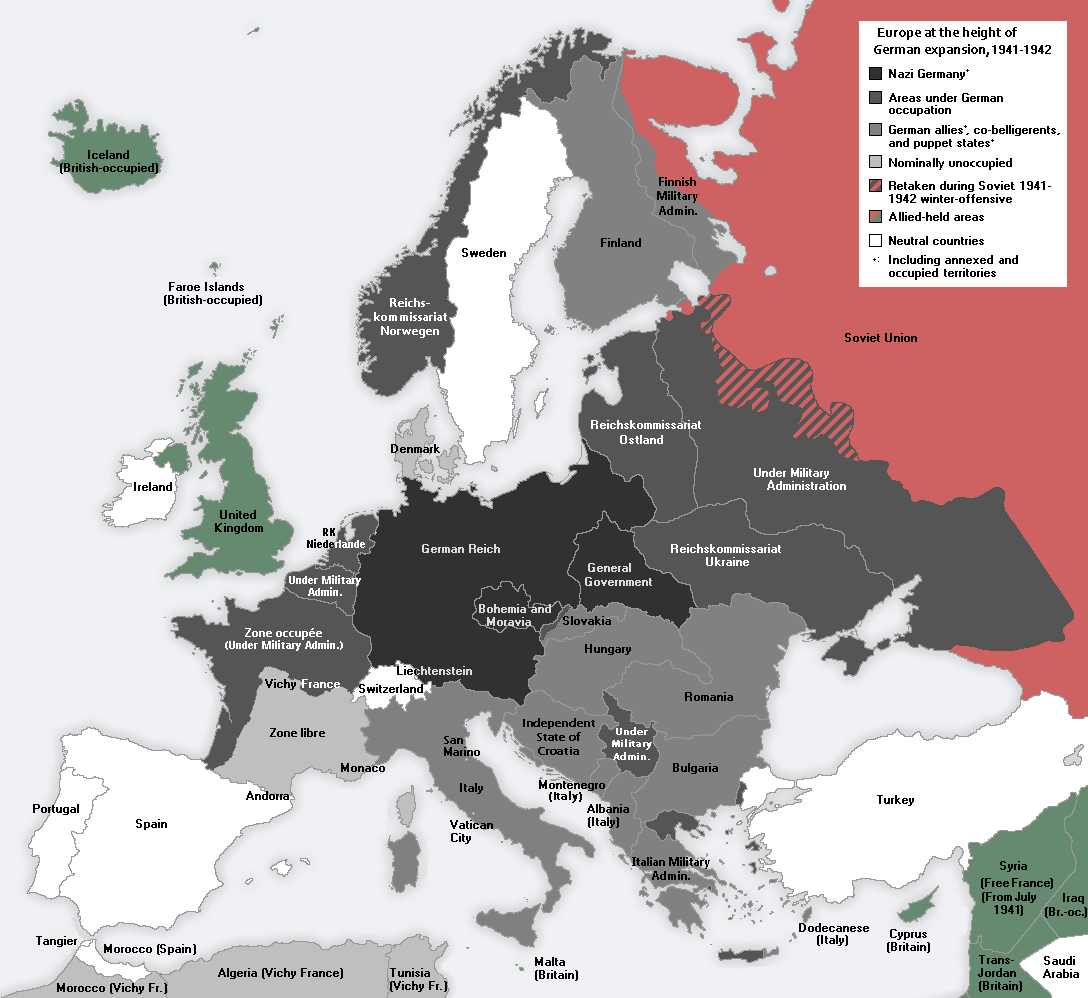
Turkey shown relative to German-occupied Europe in 1942

In 1939, Prime Minister Refik Saydam stated that Turkey "would not accept masses of Jews, nor individual Jews who were oppressed in other countries". Around 100 German Jewish refugee academics were accepted; however, a greater number of German Nazis were employed by Turkey at the time. After 1937, immigration was strictly limited to those of the "Turkish race". During the war, Jews living in Turkey faced discriminatory conscription into forced labor battalions and the 1942 wealth tax intended to financially ruin non-Muslim citizens. Turkey was the only neutral country to implement anti-Jewish laws during the war (although the law also targeted Christians).

During the war, Turkey denaturalized 3,000 to 5,000 Jews living abroad. Most of these were living in France, and by 1943, 93 percent of denaturalizations by Turkey targeted Jews. Denaturalization put Jews at high risk of being deported and murdered. Between 2,200 and 2,500 Turkish Jews were deported to extermination camps such as Auschwitz and Sobibor; and several hundred interned in Nazi concentration camps. When Nazi Germany encouraged neutral countries to repatriate their Jewish citizens in the so-called repatriation ultimatum (Heimschaffungsaktion) in late 1942, Turkish diplomats received instructions to avoid repatriating Jews even if they could prove their Turkish nationality. While other neutral countries frequently intervened on behalf of their Jewish citizens living in German-occupied Europe, historian Corry Guttstadt found that "scarcely any records of Turkish interventions on behalf of Turkish Jewish citizens can be found". According to French historian Claire Zalc, while it was possible for Turkish authorities to intervene successfully on behalf of Turkish Jews, "such interventions were rare, and they soon stopped altogether".

There is only one known case of a Turkish consul offering diplomatic protection to non-Turkish Jews, the French national Monsieur Routier. The Turkish ambassador in France, Behiç Erkin, reprimanded Routier for acting for humanitarian reasons and made him promise not to do it again. The Turkish consul in Marseilles, Fuat Carım, gave the list of "irregular" Jews helped by Routier to the Nazi authorities. In February 1943, Turkey recognized the citizenship of 631 of the 3,000 to 5,000 Jews in the Northern Zone of France. Although the Turkish consulate in Paris recognized that the remainder "had up to now been Turkish citizens", nothing would be done to help them. A few hundred Jews were repatriated to Turkey from France, but they were outnumbered by those deported to death camps.

Some Turkish officials disregarded instructions from Ankara, granting documents to Turkish Jews. However, this was not necessarily for humanitarian reasons; often sexual favors or bribes were demanded for documents that Jews had a legal right to obtain. Turkish Consul-General Ozkaya, disobeying orders, tried to repatriate 72 Turkish Jews in February 1944. On March 24–25, the SS arrested 40 Turkish Jews and took them to the Haidari concentration camp in Greece. Turkish representatives managed to free 32 of these Jews and send them to Turkey. The Turkish consul in Rhodes, Selahattin Ülkümen, saved around 50 Jews including 15–20 whose Turkish citizenship had lapsed. He is the only Turk recognized as Righteous Among the Nations as of 2020.

In 1942, 769 Jewish refugees from Romania attempting to reach Mandatory Palestine were killed in the Struma disaster after their ship sank in Turkish territorial waters. Referring to the disaster, Saydam explained that "Turkey will not become the home of people who are not wanted by anyone else". During the 1940s, around 10,000 Jews obtained transit visas enabling them to pass through Turkey on the way to Mandatory Palestine. Turkey imposed limits on these visas, issuing them only to be valid for ten days, which meant they were unusable whenever wartime conditions led to delays. Guttstadt found that "during the decisive years of 1942 and 1943, the flight through Turkey was largely blocked" and the majority of these Jews passed through Turkey in late 1944 after the Allies captured southeastern Europe.

== Commemoration ==
Turkey made threats that the safety of Jews would be put in danger if the United States Holocaust Memorial Museum (USHMM) covered the Armenian genocide or if the 1982 International Conference on the Holocaust and Genocide in Tel Aviv, which included the Armenian genocide, was not cancelled.

Since 1992, Turkey has promoted a myth of widespread rescue of Jews during the Holocaust in films such as Desperate Hours (2000) and Turkish Passport (2011) as well as books such as Last Train to Istanbul (2002) and The Ambassador (2007). This myth, pioneered in Stanford Shaw's 1993 book Turkey and the Holocaust, built on older myths that present a utopian vision of relations between Jews and Muslims in the Ottoman Empire. After the USHMM opened in 1993—the Turkish lobby having been successful in excluding the Armenian genocide from the museum's permanent exhibition—the Turkish chief rabbi demanded that the alleged rescue activities of Turkish diplomats be covered in the museum. Among the false or unsubstantiated claims made are that 100,000 Jews passed through Turkey on the way to refuge, that Necdet Kent boarded a Holocaust train to rescue eighty Jews inside, that consul Namık Kemal Yolga rescued Jews, and that Armenian genocide perpetrator Behiç Erkin rescued 20,000 Jews.

Turkey became an observer of the International Holocaust Remembrance Alliance in 2008. Prior to 2011, commemorations of the Holocaust were limited to the Turkish Jewish community with no state involvement. Scholars Yağmur Karakaya and Alejandro Baer state that Turkish officials "us[e] the Holocaust remembrance ceremony as a platform to propagate a faultless Turkish history" and "the consistent comparison by Turkish government officials of an untainted Turkish past with an inherently and persistently flawed European heritage implies a noncritical engagement with the country’s own past". At the 2011 ceremony, Süzet Sidi, president of the Turkish Chief Rabbinate Holocaust Commission, compared the Holocaust to the Armenian genocide, concluding that while the Armenians rebelled and provoked the actions against them, the Holocaust was unique in history because Jews had not rebelled.

Turkish government officials participated in Holocaust Memorial Day ceremonies for the first time in 2014; at this ceremony, foreign minister Mevlüt Çavuşoğlu claimed, "There is no trace of genocide in our history. Hostility towards the other has no room in our civilization." In 2013, Turkey's European affairs minister Egemen Bağış claimed, "In our history, there does not exist any genocide." The European affairs ministry also released a statement asserting: "Turkish society has always been away from anti-Semitic feelings [sic], has never shown any feelings of anti-Semitism and xenophobia. Our people has [sic] always embraced their Jewish brothers." According to genocide scholars Roger W. Smith, Eric Markusen, and Robert Jay Lifton, Turkey has shown a "determination to deny the Armenian genocide by acknowledging the Holocaust", and historian Marc David Baer describes this as "performative conscience clearing". These ceremonies also ignore the fact that if Turkish Jews' citizenship was recognized, they would probably not have been killed.

== See also ==
- Germany and the Armenian genocide
- International response to the Holocaust
- Francoist Spain and the Holocaust
- MV Mefküre – Turkish ship sunk in August 1944 while transporting Jewish refugees
- Relations between Nazi Germany and the Arab world

== Sources ==
- Baer, Marc D. (2020). Sultanic Saviors and Tolerant Turks: Writing Ottoman Jewish History, Denying the Armenian Genocide. Indiana University Press. ISBN 978-0-253-04542-3.
- Bahar, Izzet I. (2015). Turkey and the Rescue of European Jews. Routledge.
- Bahar, Izzet I. (2012). Turkey and the Rescue of Jews During the Nazi Era: a Reappraisal of Two Cases; German-Jewish Scientists in Turkey & Turkish Jews in Occupied France (PhD thesis). University of Pittsburgh.
- Karakaya, Yağmur; Baer, Alejandro (2019). ""Such Hatred Has Never Flourished on Our Soil": The Politics of Holocaust Memory in Turkey and Spain". Sociological Forum. 34 (3): 705–728. doi:10.1111/socf.12521. hdl:10261/371854. S2CID 200071056.
- Smith, Roger W.; Markusen, Eric; Lifton, Robert Jay (1995). "Professional Ethics and the Denial of Armenian Genocide". Holocaust and Genocide Studies. 9 (1): 1–22. doi:10.1093/hgs/9.1.1.
- Guttstadt, Corry (2018). "Turkish Responses to the Holocaust: Ankara's Policy toward the Jews, 1933–1945". Nazism, the Holocaust, and the Middle East: Arab and Turkish Responses. Berghahn Books.
- Guttstadt, Corry (2008). Turkey, the Jews, and the Holocaust. Cambridge University Press. ISBN 978-0-521-76991-4.
- Zalc, Claire (2021). Denaturalized: How Thousands Lost Their Citizenship and Lives in Vichy France. Harvard University Press. ISBN 978-0-674-98771-5.
