= International Conference on the Holocaust and Genocide =

1982 conference on genocide studies

- Host country: Israel
- Date: 20–24 June 1982
- Cities: Tel Aviv
- Venues: Hilton Tel Aviv

The International Conference on the Holocaust and Genocide was the first major conference in the field of genocide studies, held in Tel Aviv on 20–24 June 1982. It was organized by Israel Charny, Elie Wiesel, Shamai Davidson, and their Institute on the Holocaust and Genocide, founded in 1979. The conference's objective was to further the understanding and prevention of all genocides; it marked the shift from viewing genocide as an irrational phenomenon to one that could be studied and understood.

The Turkish government tried to have the conference cancelled because it included presentations on the Armenian genocide, which is denied by Turkey. The country also threatened to close its borders to Syrian and Iranian Jews fleeing persecution, thereby putting Jewish lives in danger. These threats led the Israeli Ministry of Foreign Affairs to attempt to cancel the conference and persuade attendees not to come. The official Israeli Holocaust memorial, Yad Vashem, and many high-profile participants, including Wiesel, withdrew from the conference. The organizers refused to remove the Armenian genocide from the program and held the conference anyway. Both the Turkish and Israeli governments faced criticism for their infringement on academic freedom.

== Preparation ==
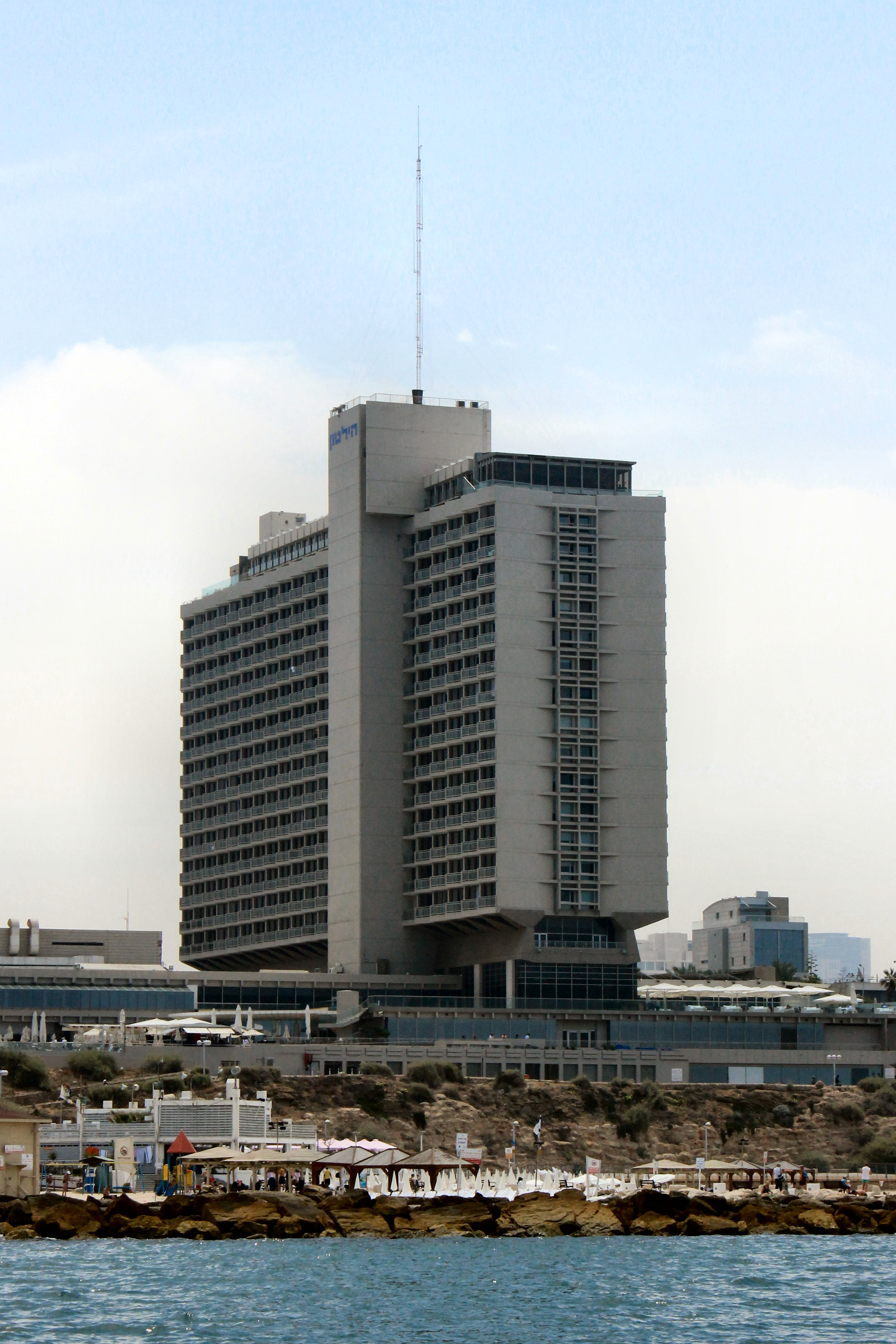
Hilton Tel Aviv, where the conference took place

The Institute on the Holocaust and Genocide was founded in 1979 by psychologist Israel Charny, psychiatrist Shamai Davidson, and the Holocaust survivor and public intellectual Elie Wiesel, devoted to the study of genocides against all peoples. The institute organized a conference, scheduled for June 1982, which was the first major international gathering devoted to genocide studies. Historian Yocheved Howard chaired the selection committee.

Of more than a hundred planned lectures, (Note: According to the Encyclopedia of Genocide, 300 lectures were planned, and Yair Auron states the organizers planned for 150 lectures.) six were devoted to the Armenian genocide, the systematic extermination of around a million Ottoman Armenians during World War I. Since the creation of the Republic of Turkey, all Turkish governments have denied that any crime was committed against the Armenian people; attempts to enlist other countries in this denial date to the 1920s. Sociologist Levon Chorbajian writes that Turkey's "modus operandi remains consistent throughout and seeks maximalist positions, offers no compromise though sometimes hints at it, and employs intimidation and threats" to prevent any mention of the Armenian genocide. In 1982, Turkey was one of the few Muslim-majority countries with which Israel maintained diplomatic relations. Israel has never recognized the Armenian genocide, due to concerns about its relationship with Turkey. The conference was the first time that the Armenian genocide was debated in the Israeli public arena.

The conference was sponsored by the official Israeli Holocaust memorial, Yad Vashem, and scheduled to begin with a torchlight ceremony at Yad Vashem; Wiesel would deliver the keynote address. Other speakers would include Yitzhak Arad, the director of Yad Vashem, and Gideon Hausner, prosecutor in the Eichmann trial. Half of the invited researchers came from Israel, the rest were from other countries. A few weeks before the conference opened, Israel invaded Lebanon; the organizers of the conference issued a statement opposing the war. The conference was held at the Hilton Tel Aviv.

Historian A. Dirk Moses states that the conference "was a high-risk venture that necessitated inflated claims about the importance of the nascent field for the sake of its business model", for example: "The Conference is a MUST for mankind as a whole and especially for those who have already suffered attempted genocide." The organizers tried to secure the attendance of high-profile academics Irving Horowitz and Robert Jay Lifton in order to be able to attract enough paid registrations to make the conference financially solvent, but both eventually backed out as Charny was unable to guarantee that their travel and accommodation would be paid for.

== Attempted cancellation ==
According to Israeli historian Yair Auron, the Turkish authorities probably learned of the conference from an article in The Jerusalem Post on 20 April 1982. A group of Turkish Jews visited Israel to make the claim that if the conference went ahead, the lives of Jews in Turkey would be in danger. The Turkish Ministry of Foreign Affairs sent Jak Veissid, the chairman of the lay council of the Turkish Jewish Community, to Israel to have the conference cancelled. Charny later recalled having been accosted in Tel Aviv by Veissid, who told him that Turkey's border would be closed to Syrian and Iranian Jews fleeing persecution if the conference went ahead.

Acceding to Turkish pressure, the Israeli Ministry of Foreign Affairs tried to have the conference cancelled; spokesmen for the ministry acknowledged this and said that it was "out of concern for the interests of Jews". According to Charny, a few months before the conference, he and the other organizers began to receive requests from the Israeli foreign ministry to cancel the conference. The conference organizers offered to remove the papers on the Armenian genocide from the official program while maintaining them in the actual conference, but this compromise was rejected by Israeli officials. Wiesel and Charny were united in their refusal to disinvite the Armenian speakers. Israeli officials suggested that all parts of the conference not related to the Holocaust could be cancelled, which was also rejected by the organizers. Charny also said that Gideon Hausner tried to get the conference canceled because he disagreed with the study of other atrocities alongside the holocaust.

Avner Arazi, the Israeli consul in Istanbul, wrote in an internal memo: "The main reason for our reckless attempts to cancel the conference was the hint that we received about Jewish refugees from Iran and Syria crossing into Turkey ... Veissid found that all the arguments he prepared against the conference were insignificant compared to the issue of the refugees." Arazi added that Turkey's military dictatorship did not understand that Israel's government was unable to cancel the conference. The Turkish government also argued that Armenian participants would undermine the uniqueness of the Holocaust; this aspect did not prove as salient as the issue of Jewish lives, which was a top priority of the Israeli foreign ministry. Although Arazi said that a border closure would be unprecedented, international relations scholar Eldad Ben Aharon concludes: "It is clear that the lives of Iranian and Syrian Jews were at stake; the Turkish Foreign Ministry did not hesitate to use this sensitive situation to exert pressure on Israel."

=== Withdrawals ===
On 3 June, Yad Vashem and Tel Aviv University withdrew from the conference. Wiesel told The New York Times that he had received multiple telegrams from the Israeli foreign ministry dealing with the threat to the Turkish Jewish community and another with a more serious threat that he would not reveal. He categorically refused to carry out the conference without Armenians and instead proposed delaying it. Charny refused to consider a delay, so Wiesel felt obliged to withdraw because "One life is more important than anything we can say about life." Despite Wiesel's withdrawal, Charny was determined "that the conference would take place even if only a proverbial ten people were to attend"; he saw the Israeli government's position as cause for "unending shame".

The Israeli foreign ministry sent Wiesel's statement to participants, urging them to withdraw. Several prominent individuals dropped out, including Arad and Hausner from Yad Vashem; Yoram Dinstein, rector of Tel Aviv University, philosopher Emil Fackenheim, historian Yehuda Bauer, and lawyer Alan Dershowitz. Rabbi Marc Tanenbaum, who had been sent by the American Jewish Committee (AJC), came to Tel Aviv but dropped out at the last minute after the AJC forbade his participation, even as a private individual. Arthur Hertzberg, former president of the AJC, who had volunteered to give the keynote lecture after Wiesel withdrew from the conference, also withdrew at the last minute, saying it was one of the most difficult decisions he had ever made. Instead, Alignment MK Ora Namir volunteered to give the address. According to Auron, the only Israeli participant who later admitted regret for withdrawing was Bauer.

Frances Gaezer Grossman, a psychologist who presented a talk on "A Psychological Study of Gentiles Who Saved the Lives of Jews During the Holocaust" at the conference, rebuffed attempts by Israeli consular officials to encourage her not to attend. She stated, "It was an affront to my dignity as a human being and as a Jew, that after the Holocaust and the establishment of the State of Israel, a Jew should be told he cannot go to an academic conference or there will be a pogrom."

The Israeli foreign ministry called up participants in the conference, urging them not to attend. It told participants that the conference would undermine the uniqueness of the Holocaust, and also claimed that it had been cancelled, preventing any notices that it had not been cancelled from being printed in newspapers. Charny reported that several American Jewish organizations cancelled cheques made to support the conference. The conference ended with a deficit despite contributions from the Armenian community. The Turkish ambassador to the United States, Şükrü Elekdağ, wrote a letter to The New York Times denying that Turkish Jews had been threatened in any way. A spokesperson for the Turkish foreign ministry told The New York Times that Turkey was "not against the conference in Tel Aviv but oppose[s] any linkage of the Holocaust to the Armenian allegations".

== Conference ==
In the conference program, Charny wrote that:

The goal of the Conference throughout is to project genocide as a universal problem in the history and future of all peoples; to honor the national and historic concerns of each people who has been fated to suffer a tragedy of mass destruction; and at the same time, to correlate these concerns with one another so that every event of genocide also reflects and articulates a concern for the destruction of all peoples.

The conference explicitly stated that it was not value-neutral when it came to genocide, but dedicated to opposing it and acting with appropriate reverence for genocide victims, in contrast to the view that science should be objective and value-free. The conference marked the shift from viewing genocide as an irrational phenomenon to one that could be studied and understood.

The conference was held from 20 to 24 June in Tel Aviv, as planned, with around 250 or 300 of a projected 600 researchers, working in several disciplines, in attendance. There were 104 presentations on the conference program, including those of genocide scholars Helen Fein, Leo Kuper and James Mace, linguist Jaroslav Rudnyckyj, literature professor John Felstiner, theologians A. Roy Eckardt and Franklin Littell, philosophers Ronald E. Santoni and Ronald Aronson, Jewish studies scholar Alan L. Berger, international law scholar Louis René Beres, human rights activist Luis Kutner. The Tibetan politician Phuntsog Wangyal and Armenian Apostolic archbishop Shahe Ajamian gave speeches. The presentations were organized into "Scenarios of Genocide Past and Future", "Case Studies" (examining the Holodomor, the situation in Tibet after the Chinese annexation, the Soviet Gulag forced labor camp system, the Romani genocide, and the Cambodian genocide), "Dynamics of Genocide", "Arts, Religion, and Education", and "Towards Intervention and Prevention". Several presentations proposed early warning systems to pick up on the risk factors for genocide before it occurred. The conference proceedings contained a representative sample of work in genocide studies and prevention, and were influential in the later development of the field.

Ajamian hosted a dinner for the Armenian guests at the King David Hotel, with Jerusalem mayor Teddy Kollek and other Israeli politicians in attendance; Yeghishe Derderian, Armenian Patriarch of Jerusalem, hosted a reception for a hundred visitors at the Armenian Patriarchate of Jerusalem. Lilli Kopecky, secretary-general of the Public Committee of Auschwitz and Other Extermination Camp Survivors in Israel, reported that "The organizers did a fantastic job in making the conference a success despite all the hardships." According to Armenian-American historian Richard Hovannisian, the conference was "crippled" but went forward "with a renewed sense of purpose". Charny considers it "a landmark conference intellectually and spiritually". Auron writes that the conference became a rallying point for Armenian genocide recognition and for academic freedom. It included films on the Armenian genocide by J. Michael Hagopian and academic research by Hovannisian, Marjorie Housepian Dobkin, Vahakn Dadrian, Vahé Oshagan, and Ronald Suny. The contributions related to the Armenian genocide were later developed into a book edited by Hovannisian, The Armenian Genocide in Perspective (1986).

== Reactions ==
The controversy was reported in the international press. Overshadowed by the war with Lebanon, the conference received brief coverage in Israeli newspapers although some Israeli journalists criticized their government's actions. In Davar, Nahum Barnea explained: "For years we spoke of the conspiracy of silence that the nations of the world maintained about the Holocaust for reasons of expediency or political exploitation, and now we know that this can also happen to us." In Haaretz, Amos Elon condemned the behavior of Yad Vashem and Israel's refusal to recognize the Armenian genocide, stating, "What would Hausner and Arad say if the Italian government (in order to avoid hurting its German creditors-claimants) decided that in an international scientific conference on genocide in Rome, the Jewish Holocaust of 1940–1945 would not be mentioned?" Arad replied that he disagreed with the organizers' comparison of the Holocaust with other genocides, especially the Armenian one. Elon concluded, "Participants returned to their home countries with a certain impression of Yad Vashem, its moral stature, and its political and intellectual independence."

Auron notes that because of the efforts to cancel it, "The conference became an arena for playing out a series of moral dilemmas and moral choices." West German journalist Heiner Lichtenstein, reporting on the conference, stated that the organizers made the right decision; because of its history Israel should not allow itself to be bullied by countries with poor human rights records. Historian Donald Bloxham considers the attempted cancellation of the conference "one of the more notorious episodes of Turkish denial" and states that it "contributed effectively to public awareness" of the genocide. In The Yale Review, Terrence Des Pres considered the cancellation attempt one of the most blatant examples of "power ordering knowledge" and, in this case, "the heroes of knowledge withstood the minions of power." Genocide scholars Roger W. Smith, Eric Markusen, and Robert Jay Lifton cite the conference as part of Turkey's willingness to go "to extraordinary lengths, including threats and disruption of academic conferences, to prevent Jews from learning about the Armenian genocide". Hovannisian states that "people of good conscience prevailed, refusing to put political considerations over moral or humanitarian impulses." Charny wrote that the state could legitimately interfere in academic freedom to a certain extent when weighty interests were at stake, but that the Israeli government's behavior crossed a line when it lied to conference participants, prevented newspapers from reporting that the conference had not been canceled, and hinted that it would fund the transfer of the conference to another location without intending to follow through. Charny believed that his organization of the conference led to his being denied tenure at Tel Aviv University.

On 21 June, Monroe H. Freedman, the legal counsel of the United States Holocaust Memorial Council, told The New York Times that, the previous year, a Turkish diplomat (Mithat Balkan) had told him that if the Armenian genocide were included in the planned United States Holocaust Memorial Museum, "the physical safety of Jews in Turkey would be threatened and Turkey might pull out of NATO." Although Balkan denied any such threats, Turkish interference in the museum and threats to Jews have been documented in other sources.

Turkish diplomat Kamuran Gürün told the Israeli consulate in Istanbul that he thought the Israeli intervention to prevent the conference primarily benefitted "the Jews", as presentations on the Armenian genocide undermined the uniqueness of the Holocaust. Arazi told Gürün the reason for the Israeli intervention was "our commitment to relations with Turkey". In 1983, Army Radio, the official radio station of the Israel Defense Forces, broadcast a program during which Yehuda Bauer had discussed similarities between the methods of extermination of the Nazis and the Young Turks. Israeli diplomat Alon Liel cited Israel's interference in the conference to appease Turkish anger over the broadcast. On later occasions, Israel has also acceded to Turkish demands regarding the Armenian genocide, for example removing recognition of the genocide from the Knesset agenda.

== See also ==
- Outline of genocide studies
- List of massacres in Turkey

== Sources ==
- Auron, Yair (2003). The Banality of Denial: Israel and the Armenian Genocide. Transaction Publishers. ISBN 978-0-7658-0834-9.
- Baer, Marc D. (2020). Sultanic Saviors and Tolerant Turks: Writing Ottoman Jewish History, Denying the Armenian Genocide. Indiana University Press. doi:10.2307/j.ctvxcrxk4. ISBN 978-0-253-04542-3. S2CID 241330953.
- Ben Aharon, Eldad (2015). "A Unique Denial: Israel's Foreign Policy and the Armenian Genocide". British Journal of Middle Eastern Studies. 42 (4): 638–654. doi:10.1080/13530194.2015.1043514. S2CID 218602513.
- Ben Aharon, Eldad (2018). "Between Ankara and Jerusalem: the Armenian Genocide as a Zero-Sum Game in Israel's Foreign Policy (1980's–2010's)". Journal of Balkan and Near Eastern Studies. 20 (5): 459–476. doi:10.1080/19448953.2018.1385932. S2CID 216142254.
- Bloxham, Donald (2005). The Great Game of Genocide: Imperialism, Nationalism, and the Destruction of the Ottoman Armenians. Oxford University Press. ISBN 978-0-19-922688-7.
- Charny, Israel W., ed. (2020) [1984]. Toward The Understanding And Prevention Of Genocide: Proceedings Of The International Conference On The Holocaust And Genocide. Routledge. ISBN 978-1-000-00326-0.
- Charny, Israel W. (1986). "Preface". In Hovannisian, Richard G. (ed.). The Armenian Genocide in Perspective. Transaction Publishers. pp. 5–8. ISBN 978-1-4128-0891-0.
- Chorbajian, Levon (2016). "'They Brought It on Themselves and It Never Happened': Denial to 1939". In Demirdjian, Alexis (ed.). The Armenian Genocide Legacy. Palgrave Studies in the History of Genocide. Palgrave Macmillan UK. pp. 167–182. doi:10.1007/978-1-137-56163-3_11. ISBN 978-1-137-56163-3.
- Colwill, David (2017). 'Genocide' and Rome, 343–146 BCE: state expansion and the social dynamics of annihilation (PhD thesis). Cardiff University. OCLC 1064648607.
- Des Pres, Terrence (1986a). "On Governing Narratives: The Turkish-Armenian Case". The Yale Review. LXXV (4): 517–531. ISSN 0044-0124.
- Des Pres, Terrence (1986b). "Introduction". In Hovannisian, Richard G. (ed.). The Armenian Genocide in Perspective. Transaction Publishers. pp. 9–18. ISBN 978-1-4128-0891-0.
- Freeman, Michael (1986). "Genocide and social science". Patterns of Prejudice. 20 (4): 3–15. doi:10.1080/0031322X.1986.9969874.
- Hovannisian, Richard G. (1986). "Foreword". The Armenian Genocide in Perspective. Transaction Publishers. pp. 1–4. ISBN 978-1-4128-0891-0.
- Hovannisian, Richard G. (2003). Looking Backward, Moving Forward: Confronting the Armenian Genocide. Routledge. ISBN 978-1-351-50830-8.
- Linenthal, Edward Tabor (1995). Preserving Memory: The Struggle to Create America's Holocaust Museum. Columbia University Press. ISBN 978-0-231-12407-2.
- Manukyan, Suren (2023). "The historiography of the Armenian Genocide". Handbook of Genocide Studies. Edward Elgar Publishing. pp. 54–71. ISBN 978-1-80037-934-3.
- Moses, A. Dirk (2021). The Problems of Genocide: Permanent Security and the Language of Transgression. Cambridge University Press. doi:10.1017/9781316217306. ISBN 978-1-009-02832-5. S2CID 242387728.
- Nelson, F. Burton (1989). "'Christian Confrontations with the Holocaust': 1934: Pivotal Year of the Church Struggle". Holocaust and Genocide Studies. 4 (3): 283–297. doi:10.1093/hgs/4.3.283.
- Sanders, Catherine (1989). "The Fight That Gives Hope: An Interview with Israel Charny". Australian and New Zealand Journal of Family Therapy. 10 (3): 169–177. doi:10.1002/j.1467-8438.1989.tb00761.x.
- Sherman, Marc I. (1999). "Institute on the Holocaust and Genocide, Jerusalem". In Charny, Israel W. (ed.). Encyclopedia of Genocide. ABC-CLIO. pp. 358–359. ISBN 978-0-87436-928-1.
- Smith, Roger W.; Markusen, Eric; Lifton, Robert Jay (1995). "Professional Ethics and the Denial of Armenian Genocide". Holocaust and Genocide Studies. 9 (1): 1–22. doi:10.1093/hgs/9.1.1.
- Somerville, John (1982). "International Genocide Conference in Tel Aviv". Fellowship. 48 (9): 13–14. ISSN 0014-9810.
