= Fuat Carım =

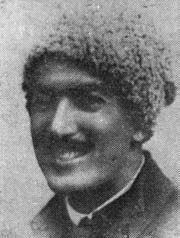
Mehmed Fuad Carim

Mehmed Fuad Carim (1892, Aleppo - 1972; Istanbul) was a Turkish politician and diplomat. On 1 June 1934, he was appointed as the Turkish Consul-General at Marseille and remained there until 30 May 1945.

== See also ==
- Behiç Erkin
- Necdet Kent
- Selahattin Ülkümen
- Namık Kemal Yolga
