= Distinguished Service Award of the Ministry of Foreign Affairs =

Distinguished Service Award
- Type: Medal
- Awarded for: In recognition of the achievements related to the Ministry of Foreign Affairs
- Date: 1989
- Country: Turkey
- Presented by: Foreign Minister
- Status: Currently awarded
- Website: mfa.gov.tr

The Distinguished Service Award of the Ministry of Foreign Affairs (Turkish: Dışişleri Bakanlığı Üstün Hizmet Ödülü) is civil award issued by the Turkish Ministry of Foreign Affairs.

The award consists of a gold medal set and a certificate signed by the Minister of Foreign Affairs. The legal basis of the award is the Ministry of Foreign Affairs' Directive No. 155 dating from 14 November 1989.

== Criteria ==
The award is given to locals and foreigners who have demonstrated exceptional success in explaining Turkey in the world stage, in the successful implementation of its foreign policy, in the protection and development of its interests, and in the promotion of its history, language, culture and art. The award is also given to those who have done admirable services in other matters falling within the scope of the Ministry's duties and responsibilities.

== Nomination and approval procedures ==
Nominations for the Distinguished Service Award are normally initiated by the Minister of Foreign Affairs. However, officials at deputy ministry or higher level who wish to recommend an individual or organization for this award may do so by submitting a memorandum of justification, cleared by the Director General, to the Ministry.

== Recipients ==
The following people and organizations have been awarded:

Date	Name	Notes
1989	Dr. John P. McGovern	American allergist and investor
1989	Feyyaz Tokar	Turkish journalist
1989	Dieter Schmidt	
1989	Pierre Dubois	
1989	Nejat Seyfullah Taşhan	
1989	İlhan Çevik	
1989	Hanns Seidel Foundation	
1990	Gunnar Jarring	Swedish diplomat
1990	Robert Arzano	
1991	Şarık Tara	
1991	Dr. Nejat Eczacıbaşı	Turkish chemist and entrepreneur
1991	Prof. Dr. William Hale	British scholar
1991	Prof. Dr. Mümtaz Soysal	Turkish political scientist
1991	Jak Kamhi	
1991	Prof. Halil İnalcık	
1991	Prof. Geoffrey Lewis	British scholar
1997	Şakir Eczacıbaşı	
1997	Prof. Anna Masala	
1998	Wim Antoon Mateman	
1998	Frederic Bennett	
1998	Takashi Morinaga	
1998	Toshiyuki Fujiwara	
1999	Chinghiz Aitmatov	Kyrgyz author
1999	Cha Hak Koo	
1999	Syed Yusuf	
1999	Albert de Vidas	
2000	Prof. Dr. Talat Halman	
2000	Prof. Dr. İhsan Doğramacı	Turkish paediatrician,
2001	Süleyman Demirel	Former president of Turkey
2001	Necati Münir Ertegün	Turkish cypriot jurist
2001	Turkish diplomats who saved the lives of Jews during the Holocaust: Consul General Necdet Kent; Consul General Selahattin Ülkümen; Consul Namık Kemal Yolga	They are mentioned with the then titles
2001	Those who have been wounded during their duty in the Ministry: Ambassador Coşkun Kırca; Ambassador Vecdi Türel; Ambassador Doğan Türkmen; Consul Kaya İnal; Counsellor Yurtsev Mıhçıoğlu; Counsellor Cavit Demir; Counsellor Deniz Bölükbaşı; First Secretary Hasan Servet Öktem; Second Secretary Gökberk Ergenekon; Atasay Mıhçıoğlu, son of Counsellor Yurtsev Mıhçıoğlu; Attaché Hüseyin Kerimoğlu; Attaché Tahsin Güvenç; Sevil Özmen, spouse of attaché Galip Özmen; Kaan Özmen, son of attaché Galip Özmen; Attaché Nilgün Keçeci; Driver Necati Kaya	They are mentioned with the then titles
2001	Prof. Dusanka Lukaç	
2001	Hugo Gobbi	
2001	Prof. Pierre Oberling	French Historian
2001	Prof. Kraus Kreiser	
2001	Karl Grabbe	
2001	Prof. Ekrem Čaušević	Bosnian linguist
2001	Michele Nicolas	
2001	Marthe Bernus-Taylor	
2001	Annie Berthier	
2001	Jacques Tobies	
2001	Teresa Batesti	
2001	Hubert Astier	
2001	Béatrix Saule	
2001	Jean-Paul Desroches	French archaeologist
2001	Nevin Menemencioğlu	
2001	Henri Adam	
2001	Hemachandra Wijeratne	Sri Lankan diplomat
2001	Dr. Lee Si-Hyung	
2001	Emile Noel	
2001	David Levy	Israeli politician
2001	Francisco Uribe Laso	
2001	Nihat Boytüzün	
2001	Alexendre Misk	
2002	Ahmet Ertegün	
2002	Elias Mendoza Habersberger	
2002	Prof. Marc Waelkens	
2002	Manas University	
2002	Erik Cornell	
2002	Sture Theolin	
2002	Henrik Liljegren	
2002	Mustafa Arhan	
2002	Şeref Arhan	
2002	Sabahattin Arhan	
2002	Dr. Andrew Mango	
2002	Prof. Salahi Sonyel	Turkish Cypriot historian
2002	Dr. Sachihiro Omura	Japanese archaeologist
2002	Ahmet Çalık	
2002	Erol Tabanca	
2002	Prof. Manfred Korfmann	German archeologist
2002	Edzard Reuter	German businessperson
2002	Michael Ackermann	
2002	Saduman Gürbüz	
2002	Dr. Aydın Yurtçu	
2002	Demir Delen	
2002	Natalya Baranova	
2002	Prof. Jean-Paul Roux	French Turkologist
2002	Gökşin Sipahioğlu	
2002	Dr. Demir Fırat Önger	
2002	Jean Pierre Salvetat	
2002	Sandra Fei	
2002	Prof. Hazai György	Hungarian Turkologist
2002	Union of Jews from Türkiye in Israel	
2002	Bruce Ruxton	
2002	Vezhdi Rashidov	
2002	Hans Christian Krüger	
2002	Heinrich Klebes	
2002	Otto von Habsburg	
2002	Sim Jae-Duck	South Korean congressman
2002	Nüzhen Önen	
2002	Sevim Önen	
2003	Dr. Elías Mendoza Habersperger	
2003	Feni Atatürk High School in Dhaka	
2005	Prof. Jaemahn Sulh	
2005	Dr. Fatih Birol	
2005	Prof. Dr. Erik-Jan Zürcher	Dutch Turkologist
2005	Antony Burgmans	
2006	Dr. Till Becker	
13 March 2006	Prof. Dr. Nurhan Atasoy	
13 March 2006	Dr. Filiz Çağman	Turkish historian
13 March 2006	Dr. Nazan Ölçer	Turkish art historian
2007	Prof. Masanori Naito	Japanese sociologist
7 April 2007	Prof. Dr. Oktay Aslanapa	Turkish academic
2007	Prof. Pedro Martínez Montávez	Spanish historian
2008	Ly Seppel	Estonian poet
2009	Mehmet Aykut Eken	
2009	Harry Blackley	
2009	Mohammed Al-Wohaibi	Omani Ambassador
2010	Prof. Bernt Brendemoen	Norwegian Turkologist
2010	Abdulwahab Mahmoud Sheikh	Saudi Arabian Consul General
18 December 2014	Nabil Maarouf	Palestinian ambassador
27 December 2014	Muhammad Haroon Shaukat	Pakistani ambassador
3 May 2016	Bonnie Joy Kaslan	Honorary Consul General in San Francisco
4 October 2017	Düsen Kaseyinov	Secretary General of TURKSOY
5 October 2017	Irina Bokova	Bulgarian Director-General of UNESCO
5 November 2017	Justin Rose	English professional golfer
13 August 2018	Ömer Engin Lütem	Turkish ambassador
13 August 2018	Bilal Şimşir	Turkish ambassador
13 August 2018	Ertuğrul Apakan	Turkish ambassador
5 December 2018	Prof. Dr. Stanislav Stachowski	Polish Turkologist
5 December 2018	Prof. Dr. Tadeusz Majda	Polish Turkologist
18 May 2019	Dr. Eusebio Leal Spengler	Cuban historian
12 October 2020	Sami Kohen	Turkish journalist
20 November 2020	Yeşim Meço Davutoğlu	Turkish philanthropist
