= Necdet Kent =

Turkish diplomat

- Born: İsmail Necdet Kent; 1 January 1911; Istanbul, Ottoman Empire
- Died: 20 September 2002 (aged 91); Istanbul, Turkey
- Education: Galatasaray High School
- Alma mater: New York University
- Occupation: Diplomat
- Known for: Claims of saving lives of Jews during World War II
- Children: Muhtar Kent
- Awards: Distinguished Service Award of the Ministry of Foreign Affairs

İsmail Necdet Kent (1 January 1911 – 20 September 2002) was a Turkish diplomat, who claimed to have risked his life to save Jews during World War II. While vice-consul in Marseille, France between 1941 and 1944, he allegedly gave documents of citizenship to dozens of Turkish Jews living in France who did not have proper identity papers, to save them from deportation to the Nazi gas chambers. These claims, first published in an appendix to Stanford J. Shaw's book Turkey and the Holocaust (1993), have not been independently verified; no survivors or their descendants have confirmed the account. Marc David Baer and other historians have documented several inconsistencies in Kent's story; Baer concludes that it is "manufactured" and Uğur Ümit Üngör calls it a "complete fabrication".

== Biography ==
=== Early life and education ===
Necdet Kent was born in 1911 in Istanbul in the Ottoman Empire and got his secondary education from Lycée de Galatasaray, as did some of his colleagues in the foreign ministry. He travelled to the United States for his university studies, earning a degree in public law from New York University. He was also briefly a professional footballer for Hull FC.

=== Career ===
Returning to Turkey, Kent entered the Ministry of Foreign Affairs in 1937. He was first posted as vice consul to Athens, Greece. In 1941, he was appointed to the post of vice consul at Marseille, France, a post which he held until 1944. Many refugees gathered in southern France during the war, and Marseille was a major port of embarkation.

After World War II, Kent continued his career in the Turkish foreign service. He served as Consul General at the Turkish Consulate General in New York City. He also was at different times the Turkish ambassador to Thailand, India, Sweden, and Poland.

Necdet Kent married and had children. One son, Muhtar Kent, was the chairman and CEO of The Coca-Cola Company from July 2008 till May 2017.

== Claims of Holocaust rescue ==
In an annex to Stanford J. Shaw's book Turkey and the Holocaust (1993), Kent's claims of rescuing Jews during the Holocaust were first published.

Kent said that, at some time in 1943, an assistant at the Turkish consulate told Kent that the Germans had just loaded 80 Turkish Jews living in Marseille into cattle cars for immediate transport to probable death in Germany. Kent later recalled, "To this day, I remember the inscription on the wagon: 'This wagon may be loaded with 20 heads of cattle and 500 kilograms of grass'." Kent approached the Gestapo commander at the station, and demanded that the Jews be released, as they were Turkish citizens and Turkey was neutral. The official refused to do so, saying that the people were nothing but Jews.

According to his own account, Kent and his assistant quickly got on the train; the German official asked him to get off, but Kent refused. At the next station, German officers boarded and apologized to Kent for not letting him off at Marseille; they had a car waiting outside to return him to his office. Kent explained that the mistake was that 80 Turkish citizens had been loaded on the train. "As a representative of a government that rejected such treatment for religious beliefs, I could not consider leaving them there," he said. Surprised at his uncompromising stance, the Germans ultimately let everyone off the train.

Kent also claimed that he reached out to the Jewish community, issuing Turkish identity documents to scores of Turkish Jews living in southern France, or those who had fled there and did not hold valid Turkish passports. Kent also said that he went to Gestapo headquarters to protest against their stripping of males in the street in Marseille to determine whether or not they were Jews by circumcision; Kent rebuked the German commander and informed him that circumcision did not necessarily prove an individual's Jewishness, since Muslims are also circumcised.

=== Verification of claims ===
Historian Marc David Baer notes several inconsistencies in Kent's story, concluding that it is "manufactured". Historian Corry Guttstadt examines the claims made, concluding that "Kent's heroic action is just completely unfounded". She criticized attempts to use "an imaginary rescue of Jews as a publicity tool".

The International Raoul Wallenberg Foundation researched the role of Turkish diplomats during the Holocaust, reporting:

to date, it was not possible to receive any independent, objective third party corroboration to the self-testimony of Mr. Necdet Kent, regarding his having boarded a Nazi deportation train and released a number of Turkish Jews from deportation or death. No single survivor or survivor’s descendent, has ever come forward verifying this account. All the IRWF attempts to get access to the official Turkish Archives, utilized by Shaw, have been ignored.

Kent has not been recognized as Righteous Among the Nations.

== Legacy and honors ==
In 2001, Kent, Namık Kemal Yolga and Selahattin Ülkümen, also Turkish diplomats who had worked in Europe and saved Jews during World War II, were honoured with the Distinguished Service Award of the Ministry of Foreign Affairs.

== See also ==
- History of the Jews in Turkey
- Behiç Erkin
- Turkish Passport (film)
