= Distinguished Service Award =

Distinguished Service Award is a term for an organization's award for services and contributions. It may refer to:

- Alan D. Berenbaum Distinguished Service Award, award given for outstanding service in the field of computer architecture and design
- Distinguished Service Award, award presented at the Honor Awards Convocation by United States Department of the Interior
- Distinguished Service Award (OA), Order of the Arrow, Boy Scouts of America
- Distinguished Service Award, Turkish Ministry of Foreign Affairs
- Distinguished Service Medal, high award of a nation, state or country
- NASA Distinguished Public Service Medal
- Secretary's Distinguished Service Award, United States Department of State
