= Hilton Tel Aviv =

Hotel in Tel Aviv, Israel

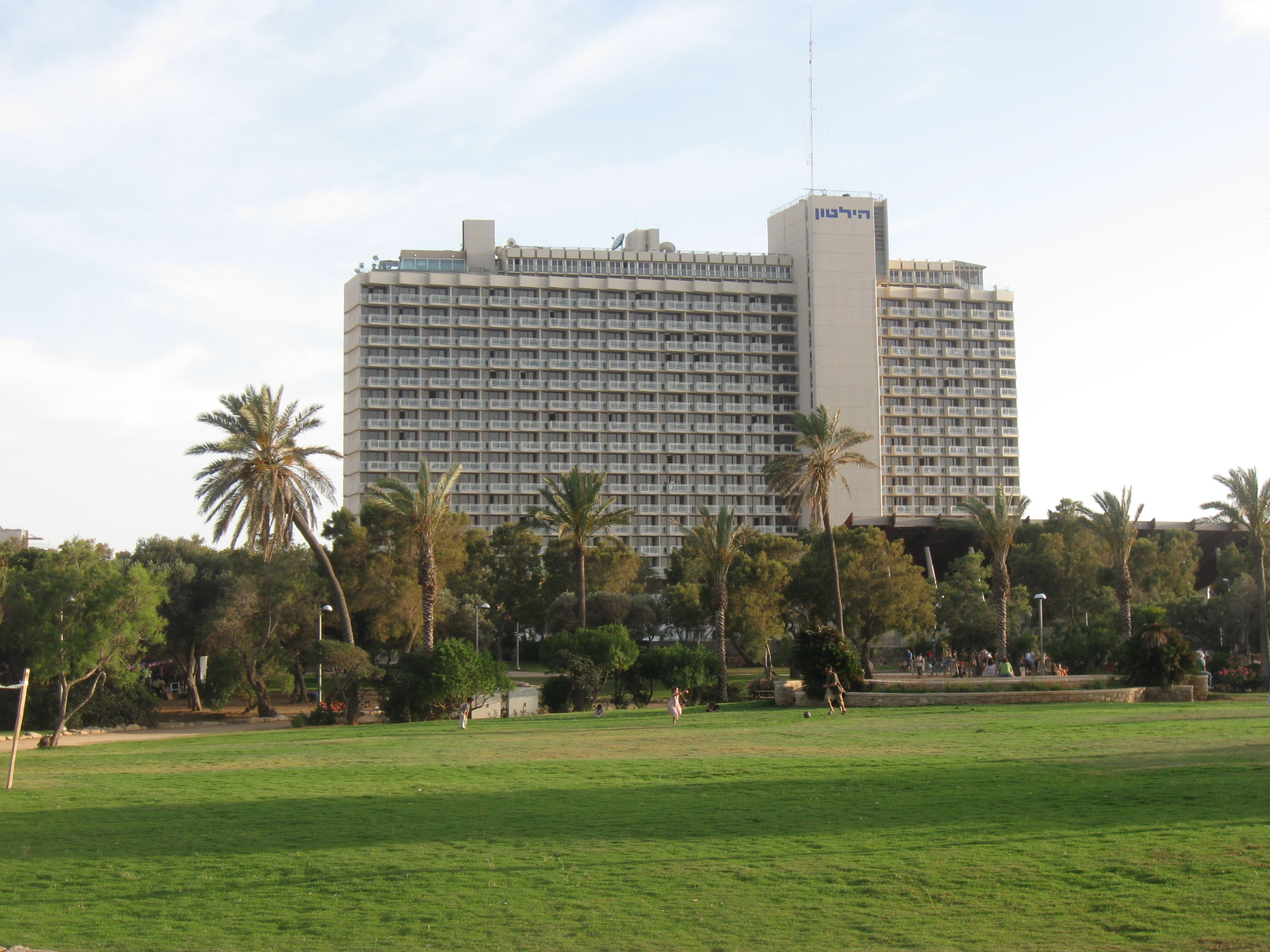
- Hilton Tel Aviv

- Location within Israel
- Hotel chain: Hilton Hotels & Resorts

General information
- Type: Hotel
- Location: 205 Ha-Yarkon St, Tel Aviv, Israel
- Coordinates: 32°05′21″N 34°46′15″E
- Opened: 1965
- Owner: Hilton Worldwide

Other information
- Number of rooms: 560

Website
- www.hilton.com/en/hotels/tlvhitw-hilton-tel-aviv/

The Hilton Tel Aviv is a large hotel, managed by Hilton Hotels, located in the heart of Tel Aviv, Israel, in Independence Park, with direct access to the Hilton Public Beach and the Tel Aviv Promenade.

== History ==
The Tel Aviv Hilton was built on the site of the 'Abd en-Nabi cemetery, used by the residents of Al-Mas'udiyya (Summeil) from at least the 19th century until the depopulation of the village in 1948. The construction generated a protest that included the Cairo Hilton threatening to shut down. Eventually, most of the graves were moved elsewhere, but a small section remains, together with the shrine of 'Abd en-Nabi.

Construction of the hotel began on September 13, 1962. It was designed by architect Yaakov Rechter, in the late modern style. During its construction three workers were killed. Prime Minister Levi Eshkol attended the hotel's official opening on September 13, 1965. It was the largest, most modern hotel in the country at the time.

The hotel was expanded in 1970, with a new wing on the east side, adding an additional 12 rooms to every floor. In 1982, the hotel hosted the International Conference on the Holocaust and Genocide. In 2000, the hotel underwent a complete renovation. In 2016, the Vista Lounge on the 17th floor was completely redone and The Vista at Hilton Tel Aviv (a luxury property) was opened on the top four floors of the building, and in 2017, the lobby was renovated. The rooms undergo renovations annually.

== Pop culture ==
The hotel plays a prominent role in Nicole Krauss's 2017 novel Forest Dark.
