= Shamai Davidson =

Israeli professor, psychiatrist and psychoanalyst (1926–1986)

- שמאי דוידסון
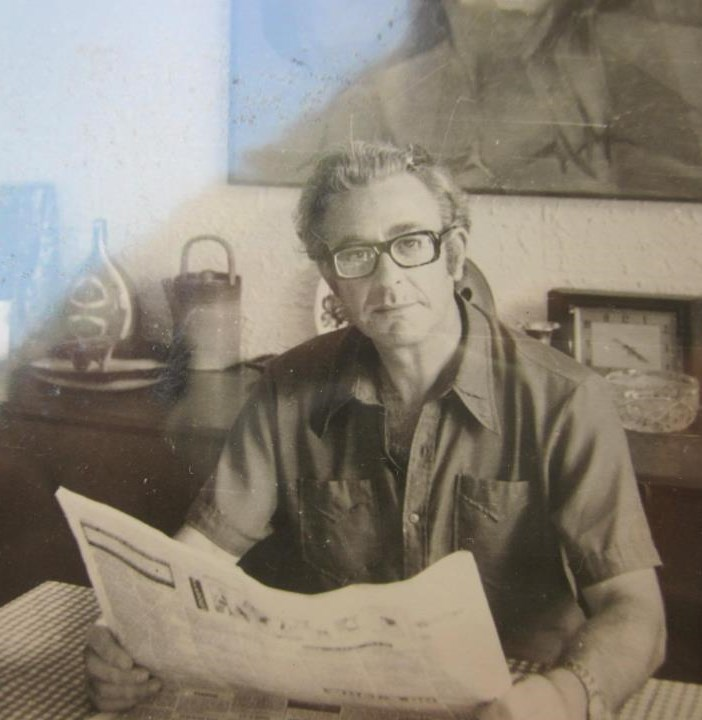
- Born: 1926; Dublin, Ireland
- Died: 1986 (aged 59–60)
- Education: University of Glasgow, Oxford University Medical School
- Known for: Holocaust survivor studies
- Notable work: Holding on to Humanity
- Scientific career
- Fields: Psychiatry, Psychoanalysis
- Workplaces: Shalvata Mental Health Center

Shamai Davidson (Hebrew: שמאי דוידסון; 1926–1986) was an Israeli professor, psychiatrist and psychoanalyst, who spent 30 years working with Holocaust survivors, trying to understand the nature of their experience. He was medical director of Shalvata Mental Health Center and served as head of the Elie Wiesel Chair for the Study of the Psycho-Social Trauma of the Holocaust.

== Early life and education ==
Born in Dublin, Davidson grew up in a traditional Jewish home in Glasgow. He lost many of his relatives in the Warsaw Ghetto, Łódź Ghetto, and the gas vans of Chelmno. He studied medicine at the University of Glasgow and in Oxford University Medical School. In 1979 he became the co-founder of the Institute on the Holocaust and Genocide along with Israel W. Charny and Elie Wiesel, and worked as a psychiatrist and psychoanalyst, treating Holocaust survivors, until his death.

Davidson is best known for his work Holding on to Humanity which he started in 1972. According to the Jerusalem Post, "In this intensely fascinating book, Davidson succeeds in conveying a systematic understanding of trauma and survival as a whole, while emphasizing individual difference."

== Career ==
Davidson immigrated to Israel, where he became deeply involved in the study and treatment of Holocaust survivors. He served as the Medical Director of the Shalvata Mental Health Center and was appointed to the Elie Wiesel Chair for the Study of the Psycho-Social Trauma of the Holocaust.

Davidson co-founded the Institute on the Holocaust and Genocide in Jerusalem alongside Elie Wiesel and Israel W. Charny. His research focused on the psychological effects of the Holocaust, aiming to understand the trauma and resilience of survivors.

== Notable work ==
Davidson is best known for his book Holding on to Humanity: The Message of Holocaust Survivors, which he began in 1972. The work offers a systematic understanding of trauma and survival, emphasizing individual differences among survivors.
