= Institute on the Holocaust and Genocide =

Israeli research institute

The institute on the Holocaust and Genocide was founded in Jerusalem, in 1979, by Israeli scholars Israel W. Charny, Shamai Davidson and Nobel Laureate Elie Wiesel.

In 1982 the institute on the Holocaust and Genocide held an interdisciplinary, multiple ethnic conference on the genocides of all peoples "First International Conference on the Holocaust and Genocide", while the New York Times and other world press reported about the efforts of several governments to close the conference down. In particular, despite reported Turkish threats of reprisals against Israel and Turkish Jews, it included also lections on Armenian genocide.

Among the notable publications of Institute are "Medical and Psychological Effects of Concentration Camps on Holocaust Survivors" by Robert Krell, Marc I. Sherman and Elie Wiesel (Transaction Publishers, 1988), "Genocide: A Critical Bibliographic Review" by Israel W. Charny, Vol. 1, 1988; Vol. 2, 1991 (London, re-issued in New York City), "Enciclopedia of Genocide" (Santa Barbara, 1999) and "Holding on to Humanity - The Message of Holocaust Survivors" by Shamai Davidson (New York University Press, 1992).

Since 1987 the institute on the Holocaust and Genocide has published a newsletter, Internet on Holocaust and Genocide, which covers studies, books and magazine articles on Holocaust and other genocides.

== Sources ==
- Dictionary of Genocide, by Samuel Totten, Paul Robert Bartrop, Steven L. Jacobs, 2007, p. 213
