= Mehmet Ali İrtemçelik =

Turkish politician

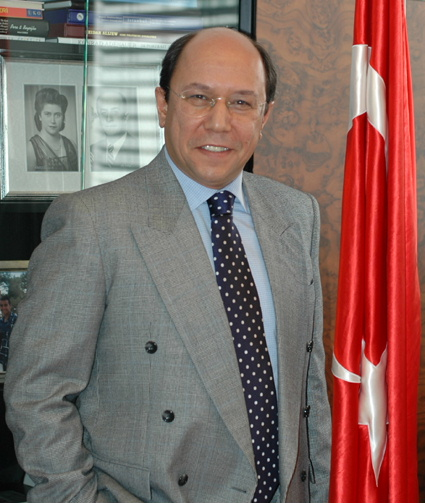
Mehmet Ali İrtemçelik in his office in Berlin, Germany

Mehmet Ali İrtemçelik (born March 17, 1950, in Istanbul) is the previous ambassador of the Republic of Turkey to Germany. He has also served as member of parliament in the Grand National Assembly of Turkey and as a minister of state in the Council of Ministers of Turkey. He graduated from Galatasaray High School and Boğaziçi University, both in Istanbul, Turkey.

== Diplomatic career ==
He started his diplomatic career on March 4, 1975. He has served as Assistant Consul in the Consulate General of Turkey in Chicago, United States (1977–1980, as second Attaché and head Attaché in the Embassy of Turkey in Kabul, Afghanistan (1980–1982), as head of section in the Multilateral Relations Bureau in the Ministry of Foreign Affairs in Ankara, Turkey (1982–1984), as Attaché and Director in the Permanent Representation of Turkey to the United Nations (1984–1988), as a consultant to the Minister of Foreign Affairs between 1988 and 1991 (with the title of ambassador from 1989 onwards) and as a consultant to the Prime Minister in 1991. He became the youngest ambassador in the history of the Republic of Turkey when he was given that title in 1989 when he was thirty-nine years old.

He was the Turkish ambassador in Amman, Jordan between November 29, 1991, and July 31, 1995, and in Sofia, Bulgaria between July 31, 1995, and November 3, 1997. After his ambassadorship to Sofia terminated, he served as the assistant Director in the Bilateral Political Relations Bureau of the Ministry of Foreign Affairs until January 11, 1999.

== Political career and return to diplomatic service ==
However, he left his diplomatic career to get into politics, and was elected as head of list from the Motherland Party (Turkish: Anavatan Partisi - ANAP) from the third circonscription of Istanbul (covering all of the Asian side of the city) on April 18, 1999. He served as the Minister of State for European Union affairs and Human Rights issues between May 27, 1999, and May 6, 2000, while serving as the government spokesman during the same period. During his tenure as member of parliament, he served in the parliament's Foreign Relations Committee and in the Turkish delegation to the European Council's Assembly of Members of Parliament. After falling out with his former classmate from high school and party leader, Mesut Yılmaz, as well as with then-Prime Minister Bülent Ecevit after having accused him of not respecting, and trying to tinker with, the Constitution before the presidential elections of 2000, he resigned on May 6, 2000, both from his party and the government to become an independent in the parliament. He did not seek re-election in 2002 and returned to diplomatic service when was appointed the Turkish ambassador to Germany by the government of Recep Tayyip Erdoğan on October 16, 2003. He is currently serving at the Foreign Ministry.

He is fluent both in French (having attended French-taught Galatasaray High School) as well as in English (having attended English-taught Boğaziçi University). He is married and has three children.

== See also ==
- Politics of Turkey
- Foreign relations of Turkey
- 1999 Turkish general election
- List of Turkish diplomats
