= Turkish Passport (film) =

- Directed by: Burak Arliel
- Written by: Deniz Yeşilgün, Gökhan Zincir
- Music by: Alpay Göltekin, Alp Yenier
- Distributed by: Filmpot
- Release date: May 20, 2011
- Running time: 91 minutes
- Country: Turkey
- Languages: Turkish, English & French

Turkish Passport is a 2011 Turkish film directed by Burak Arliel that purports to tell the story of rescue of Jews during the Holocaust by Turkish diplomats. It was promoted as "the only Holocaust film with a happy ending".

The film competed in the 'European Documentary' category at the European Independent Film Festival 2012.

The historical accuracy of the film has been criticized, for presenting unsubstantiated accounts of rescue. Historian Marc David Baer calls it a "propaganda film". Turkish-born historian Uğur Ümit Üngör states that the film is "based on manipulation, mystification, and misrepresentation".

== Production ==
Turkish Jews helped to produce the film. Historian Uğur Ümit Üngör states that "The attitudes of these Jewish community leaders represent the Stockholm syndrome of some minority elites in Turkey, who believe that only absolute conformism to the Turkish government can guarantee their security in the country." The film was financed partly by the Turkish government.

== Synopsis ==
Turkish Passport tells the story of diplomats posted to Turkish embassies and consulates in several European countries, who are presented as saving numerous Jews during the Second World War. Whether they pulled them out of Nazi concentration camps or took them off the trains that were taking them to the camps, the diplomats, in the end, ensured that the Jews who were Turkish citizens could return to Turkey and thus be saved. The film portrays diplomats as saving not only the lives of Turkish Jews, but also rescued foreign Jews by giving them Turkish passports.

At the end of the film, Jews are depicted celebrating after their train crosses the border from Bulgaria into Turkey. Contrary to what is portrayed in the film, 15,000 Jews from this region had fled as a result of the 1934 Thrace pogroms.

== Awards and coverage at festivals ==
- The film was shown for the first time at the Cannes Film Festival on May 18, 2011.
- At the 2011 Moondance International Film Festival, it won 'Best Feature Documentary Award' in the Foreigner Category
- Adana Golden Boll Film Festival 2011 - Feature Film Finalist Category -
- Antalya Golden Orange Film Festival 2011 - Special Screening -
- Atlanta Jewish Film Festival 2012 - included to program -
- The European Independent Film Festival 2012 - Foreigner Category, Best Feature Documentary Finalist -
- Zagreb Jewish Film Festival 2012 - included to program -
- UNSPOKEN Human Rights Film 2011 - included to program -
- Amsterdam Turkish Film Festival - participated -
- Yosemite Film Festival 2011 - the winner of the John Muir Award

== Historical accuracy ==
The historical accuracy of the film has been criticized. The claimed rescues are not substantiated beyond the testimony of alleged rescuers. One of the alleged rescuers profiled in the film, Behiç Erkin, was a perpetrator of the Armenian genocide. Thousands of expatriate Turkish Jews were deported to the death camps because their citizenship was denied by Turkish officials, but this fact is never mentioned in the film. Only one Turkish diplomat, Selahattin Ülkümen, has been recognized as Righteous Among the Nations, but he is not covered in the film.

According to historian Corry Guttstadt, the film "aims at reinforcing the Turkish official line, which states that Turkey generously saved thousands of Jews during World War II", despite the lack of evidence to support this narrative. She criticizes a variety of historical inaccuracies in the film, calling it a pseudo-documentary.

Baer states that "Turkish Passport and efforts like it are actually a form of Holocaust denial", since they ignore the fate of Turkish Jews who were killed.
