= Behiç Erkin =

Turkish minister and ambassador (1876–1961)

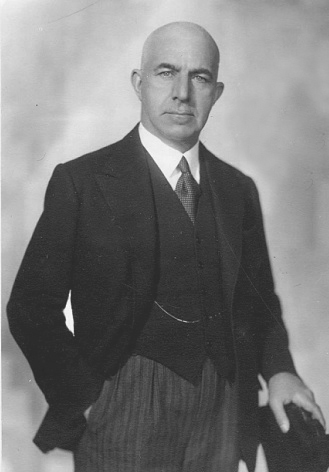

Ambassador of Turkey to France
- In office 1939–1943
- President: İsmet İnönü

Ambassador of Turkey to Hungary
- In office 1928–1939
- President: Mustafa Kemal Atatürk; İsmet İnönü

Minister of Public Works
- In office January 14, 1926 – October 15, 1928
- Prime Minister: İsmet İnönü
- Preceded by: Süleyman Sırrı Gedikoğlu
- Succeeded by: Recep Peker

Director General of the TCDD
- In office December 1, 1921 – January 11, 1926
- Succeeded by: Vasfi Tuna

Personal details
- Born: Hakkı Behiç; 1876 Constantinople, Ottoman Empire
- Died: November 11, 1961 (aged 84–85) Istanbul, Turkey
- Resting place: Eskişehir
- Education: Ottoman Military Academy, Ottoman Military College
- Occupation: Army officer, director general, government minister, ambassador, politician
- Awards: Iron Cross 1st Class (Germany); Medal of Independence (Turkey)

Military service
- Rank: Colonel
- Battles/wars: World War I Turkish War of Independence

Behiç Erkin (1876 – November 11, 1961) was a Turkish career officer, Armenian genocide perpetrator, first director (1920–1926) of the Turkish State Railways, nationalized under his auspices, statesman and diplomat of the Turkish Republic. He was Minister of Public Works, 1926–1928, and deputy for three terms; and an ambassador. He served as Turkey's ambassador to Budapest between 1928–1939, and to Paris and Vichy between August 1939-August 1943.

Although it has been claimed that Erkin rescued 20,000 Jews during the Holocaust, these claims are unsubstantiated. The film Turkish Passport was criticized for "attempts to whitewash a perpetrator of the Armenian genocide by painting him as a rescuer in the Holocaust".

== Early life ==
Behiç Erkin was born as Hakkı Behiç in 1876 in Constantinople, Ottoman Empire.

== Career ==
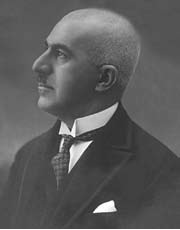
Behiç Erkin in the 1920s.

Starting in the early 1910s, Erkin was a close friend and early collaborator of Mustafa Kemal Atatürk. Mustafa Kemal and Colonel Behiç Bey (Erkin) played crucial roles in the success of the battles at the Dardanelles front, where both men commanded during World War I. Erkin earned a high reputation and the German Iron Cross 1st Class military decoration, which served him when he needed to impress Germans during the Occupation. He also played a foremost part in the Turkish War of Independence. He took the family name "Erkin" after Turkey's 1934 Law on Family Names was passed. His surname "Erkin," which means "free man" was personally suggested by Atatürk in honor of his ability to make objective decisions in the face of outside pressure.

During the Armenian genocide, Erkin helped organize the deportation of Armenian railway workers.

== Mission in France ==
In 1939 then President İsmet İnönü hand-picked Erkin for the post of ambassador to France.

According to a census French authorities conducted under German Army direction in autumn 1940, 3,381 of a total of 113,467 Jews over age 15, residing in Paris and holding French nationality, were of Turkish origin. The total number of Turkish Jews were estimated at five thousand people if those under 15 were counted. Scholars have estimated possibly ten thousand Jews of Turkish origin for the whole of France at the time.

Erkin received orders not to repatriate Turkish Jews in large numbers to safety in their home country, and, according to historian Marc David Baer, "played his part in preventing the vast majority of Turkish Jews in Nazi Europe to find safety". There is only one verified account of a Turkish diplomat offering identity cards to non-Turkish Jews for humanitarian reasons. Erkin reported this "improper behavior" to the Turkish foreign ministry.

Aged 67 in 1943 and having had his ambassadorial term extended three times, Erkin retired in August 1943 to return to Istanbul. In 1958 he completed his memoirs (published in 2010). Behiç Erkin died on November 11, 1961. At his wish, he was buried in a courtyard near a railway junction in the Enveriye Train Station in Eskişehir, where he had started his career four decades before.

== Biographical accounts ==
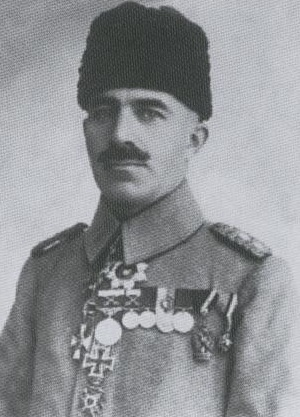
Erkin during World War I

Erkin completed a 900-page memoir in 1958, published in 2010 by the Turkish Historical Society. His grandson used the memoir as the basis for his own research about his grandfather's life. In 2007 Emir Kıvırcık, Erkin's grandson, published The Ambassador, an account of Erkin's tenure in France. Baer describes this book as "hagiography", and notes it was implicitly marketed for its utility in furthering Turkey's Armenian genocide denial. In The Road to the Front (Cepheye Giden Yol) (2008), Kıvırcık covered his grandfather Erkin's World War I years.

The efforts of Erkin in saving Turkish Jews have been greatly exaggerated. Historian Corinna Guttstadt found that the number of saved Jews was only 114, not in the thousands as claimed by other biographies. Furthermore, according to the same article, the number of Jews that have been identified by the German authorities as possible Turkish citizens was 3036, so the number of people saved by Erkin appears to be a small fraction of the total.

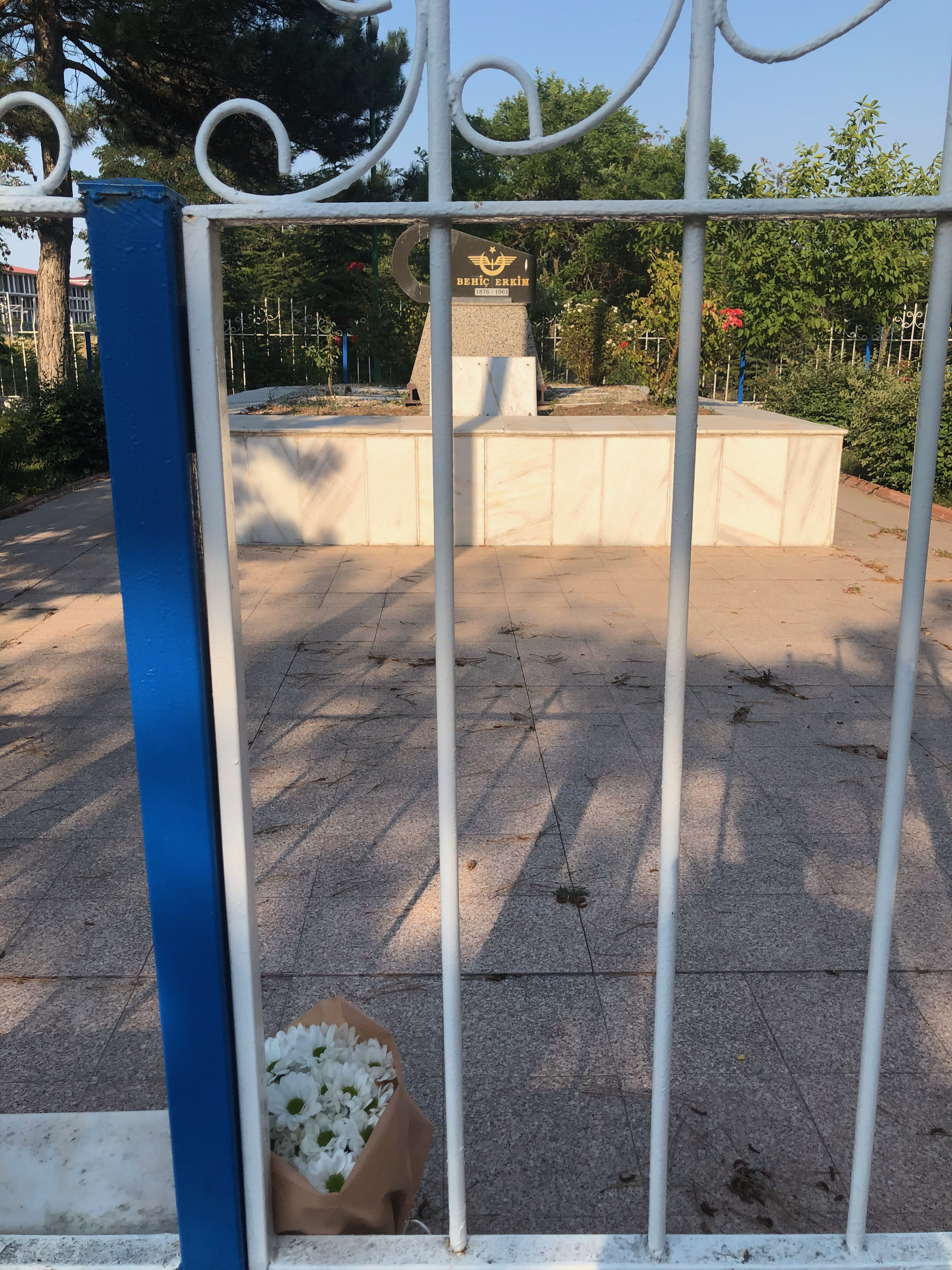
Erkin's Grave

== Yad Vashem application ==
In April 2007, an Israeli association of Jews with origins in Turkey applied to have Erkin included among the "Righteous Among the Nations" in Yad Vashem Holocaust Memorial. The applicants, principally Israelis with origins in Turkey, are seeking witnesses to help document their application.

== See also ==
- Necdet Kent
- Namık Kemal Yolga
- Selahattin Ülkümen
- History of the Jews in Turkey
- Oskar Schindler
- SS Kurtuluş

== Honors and awards ==
- Knight of the Order of Legion of Honour
- Iron Cross
- Order of the Red Eagle

== Films ==
- Turkish Passport (2011) www.theturkishpassport.com
- Desperate Hours (2005)
