= List of Turkish diplomats =

List of notable diplomats of the Republic of Turkey, past and present. The names are listed in an alphabetical order according to their last names, with their positions and other relevant information.

== In alphabetical order ==
=== A ===
- Akçapar, Burak (born 1967): Turkish diplomat and author.

=== B ===
- Bozkır, Volkan (born 1950) Turkish diplomat and politician who served as the President of the United Nations General Assembly from 2020 to 2021.

=== C ===
- Cem İpekçi, İsmail (1940–2007) is a Turkish politician, statesman and former minister of foreign affairs of Turkey. He served as foreign minister from June 30, 1997 until July 10, 2002. He was the fourth longest-serving minister of this position. He was a member of Republican People's Party.
- Çetin, Hikmet (born 1937): former minister of foreign affairs and was leader of the Republican's People Party for a short time. He served also as the speaker of the parliament.

=== D ===
- Diriöz, Hüseyin (born 1956) is an ambassador, previously the chief advisor to the President of Republic of Turkey on foreign policy, and currently Assistant Secretary General of NATO.

=== E ===
- Eldem, Sadi (1910–1995): He was the ambassador of Turkey to Pakistan, Spain and Iran. He was married to Rana Hanımsultan, a member of the Ottoman dynasty.
- Ertegün, Münir (1883–1944): He was a famous Turkish politician and diplomat of late years of the Ottoman Turkey and first years of the Republic of Turkey. He is the father of Ahmet Ertegün and Nesuhi Ertegün, brothers who founded the Atlantic Records and are iconic figures of the American music industry.

=== G ===
- Güntekin, Reşat Nuri (1889–1956): Turkish novelist, storywriter, playwright and diplomat. Cultural attaché to Paris (1950), when he was also the Turkish representative to UNESCO.

=== I ===
- İlkin, Baki (1943–2018): He served as the representative of Turkey to the United Nations. He entered the diplomatic service in 1969.
- İrtemçelik, Mehmet Ali (born 1950): He started his diplomatic career on March 4, 1975. He has also served as member of parliament in the Grand National Assembly of Turkey (between April 18, 1999 and November 3, 2002) and as the minister of state for European Union affairs and Human Rights issues while at the same time serving as the spokesman for the Council of Ministers of Turkey (between May 27, 1999 and May 6, 2000).

=== K ===
- Kent, Necdet (1911–2002): was a Turkish diplomat who risked his life to save Jews during World War II. He was posted as Consul General to Marseille between 1941 and 1944, gave Turkish citizenship to dozens of Turkish Jews living in France who did not have proper identity papers to save them from deportation to the Nazi gas chambers. He was honored with Turkey's Supreme Service Medal as well as a special medal from Israel for rescuing Jews during the Holocaust along with Selâhattin Ülkümen and Namık Kemal Yolga.
- Korutürk, Fahri (1903–1987) was a Turkish navy officer, diplomat and the 6th president of Turkey. Started diplomatic service in 1960, served as ambassador to the Soviet Union and Spain.
- Kuneralp, Zeki (1914–1998): He served as the Turkish ambassador to a number of countries in Europe. His wife, Necla Kuneralp, and a retired ambassador, Beşir Balcıoğlu, were killed in an attack by Armenian militants, along with their driver, Antonio Torres, while he was serving as the Turkish ambassador to Spain.

=== R ===
- Tevfik Rüştü Aras (1883–1972) - Minister of Foreign Affairs under Mustafa Kemal Atatürk

=== S ===
- Sinirlioğlu, Feridun (born 1956): Diplomat and he is elected as the OSCE Secretary General

=== T ===
- Türkmen, Doğan (1922–2014): He served in Lagos as ambassador of the Republic of Turkey to Nigeria from January 28, 1969, to December 16, 1971. While serving as ambassador of Turkey to Bern, Switzerland, he was attacked by an Armenian gunman. He escaped with minor injuries.

=== U ===
- Ülkümen, Selâhattin (1914–2003): He was a Turkish diplomat on the island of Rhodes, Greece, who assisted local Jews escape the Holocaust. Turkish and Greek Jews alike were deported to the death camps from the island of Corfu, but on the island of Rhodes, where Jews had prospered during three hundred ninety years of Ottoman rule until 1917 and under Italian occupation from then until 1943, Turkey’s Consul, Selâhattin Ülkümen, saved the lives of some 42 Jewish Turkish families, totaling more than 200 persons among a Jewish community of some 2000 after the Germans took over the island following Benito Mussolini’s removal from power and Italy’s armistice with the Allies. He was honored with Turkey's Supreme Service Medal as well as a special medal from Israel and recognized by Yad Vashem as "Righteous Gentile" (Hebrew: Hassid Umot ha'Olam) for rescuing Jews during the Holocaust along with Necdet Kent and Namık Kemal Yolga.
- Üzümcü, Ahmet (born 1951). Career diplomat who was the ambassador to Israel, permanent representative to the United Nations and the Conference on Disarmament. Since 2010, he is director-general of the Organisation for the Prohibition of Chemical Weapons.

=== Y ===
- Yolga, Namık Kemal (1914–2001): was a Turkish diplomat and statesman, known as the Turkish Schindler. During World War II, Yolga was the Vice-Consul at the Turkish Embassy in Paris, France. His efforts to save the lives of Turkish Jews from the Nazi concentration camps earned him the title of "Turkish Schindler". He was honored with Turkey's Supreme Service Medal as well as a special medal from Israel for rescuing Jews during the Holocaust along with Necdet Kent and Selâhattin Ülkümen.

=== Z ===
- Zorlu, Fatin Rüştü (1910–1961): He was a Turkish diplomat and politician. He was executed by hanging after the coup d'état in 1960 along with two other politicians. He began his career as a diplomat in 1932. He served as the Minister of Foreign Affairs from 1957 until the Turkish Armed Forces staged a coup on May 27, 1960 and ousted the government of Adnan Menderes, the Prime Minister of the time.

== See also ==
- List of Turkish diplomats assassinated by Armenian militant organisations
- Foreign relations of Turkey
- Ministry of Foreign Affairs of Turkey
- Turkish diplomatic missions
- Politics of Turkey
- Republic of Turkey
