= Pierre Oberling =

French-born historian and ethnologist (1929–2014)

- Born: 1929; Strasbourg, France
- Died: 22 March 2014; Reston, Virginia, United States

Academic background
- Alma mater: Cornell University; Columbia University

Academic work
- Discipline: History, ethnology
- Institutions: Hunter College
- Main interests: Turkic peoples, Iran, Cyprus dispute
- Notable works: The Qashqa'i Nomads of Fars (1974); The Road to Bellapais (1982)

Pierre Oberling (1929 – 22 March 2014) was a French-born American historian and ethnologist.

Oberling was a professor of history at Hunter College from 1963 to 1998. His academic research initially focused on the Turkic peoples of Iran, particularly the Qashqai, before turning to the history and politics of the Turkish Cypriots. He authored several works on Cyprus.

His writings on the Cyprus problem have been criticized for their strongly pro-Turkish bias and selective treatment of historical events. His most prominent work on Cyprus, The Road to Bellapais (1982), was criticized by historians and other specialists for presenting only the Turkish perspective, omitting Turkish atrocities and failing to apply the same standards of criticism to Greek and Turkish political leaders. In 1985, Oberling was listed among 69 scholars who signed a public statement challenging the recognition of the Armenian genocide. In 2001, he received the Distinguished Service Award from the Turkish Ministry of Foreign Affairs.

== Early life and education ==
Oberling was born in Strasbourg, Alsace, France, in 1929, to the French pathologist Charles Oberling and his wife Martha. During his childhood, he travelled extensively with his family throughout Europe and the Middle East. He spent two years in Tehran, Iran, during the World War II, before immigrating to the United States in 1942.

He received a master's degree in French literature from Cornell University in 1951, followed by a master's degree in international affairs in 1953 and a doctorate in Middle Eastern Languages and Cultures from Columbia University in 1960. After briefly teaching in Athens and Istanbul, he joined Hunter College of the City University of New York in 1963, where he taught European and Middle Eastern history until his retirement in 1998.

Oberling also served as director and treasurer of the American Research Institute in Turkey, co-editor of Near and Middle East Monographs, and contributing editor of the Encyclopaedia Iranica.

== Career and writings ==
=== Iranian studies ===
Oberling's early academic research focused on the Turkic-speaking tribes of southern Iran. His doctoral dissertation, The Turkic Peoples of Southern Iran, was completed in 1960. In 1974, he published The Qashqa'i Nomads of Fars, an ethnographic and historical study of the Qashqai people, their social organization and their relationship with the Iranian state.

The book was reviewed by anthropologist Jean-Pierre Digard in L'Homme in 1976 and Lois Beck in Iranian Studies in 1977.

=== Cyprus ===
Oberling later began researching the political and cultural history of the Turkish Cypriots. In 1982, he published The Road to Bellapais: The Turkish Cypriot Exodus to Northern Cyprus, which examined the displacement of Turkish Cypriots and the Cyprus conflict of the 1960s and 1970s.

In 1985–1986, Oberling received a conference travel grant from the Institute of Turkish Studies, an organization established with $3 million in funding from the Turkish government. A document reproduced in the Congressional Record in February 1990 listed one individual grant awarded to Oberling by the institute, as well as a separate institutional grant associated with Hunter College.

Afterwards, he published The Cyprus Tragedy (1989), Negotiating for Survival: The Turkish Cypriot Quest for a Solution to the Cyprus Problem (1991), and The Heart of a Nation: A History of Turkish Cypriot Culture 1571–2001 (2007). He also authored The Double Representation Conspiracy: How the Greek and Greek Cypriot Governments Are Precipitating a New Crisis in Cyprus by Using the European Union, a pamphlet published by CYREP in northern Cyprus.

His writings generally presented the Turkish Cypriot interpretation of the conflict, emphasizing Turkish Cypriot grievances, their displacement during the intercommunal violence of 1963–1964 and their struggle for political recognition. In his later work Negotiating for Survival, Oberling characterized the Turkish invasion of Cyprus as an action intended to allegedly prevent the supposed "ethnic cleansing" of Turkish Cypriots, a claim widely regarded as inaccurate and propagandistic.

In 2001, Oberling received the Distinguished Service Award from the Turkish Ministry of Foreign Affairs.

== Reception and criticism ==
Oberling's writings on Cyprus have received considerable criticism for their pro-Turkish perspective, selective presentation of atrocities and treatment of the political responsibility of Greece and Turkey.

In a review published in History, British historian Douglas Dakin criticized The Road to Bellapais for its one-sided treatment of the Cyprus conflict. He described its treatment of the Cyprus question as "entirely inadequate". Dakin wrote that Oberling presented only the Turkish case, made no mention of Turkish atrocities and attacked Greek political leaders without applying the same criteria to their Turkish counterparts. He also criticized Oberling's failure to adequately examine the role of the United Nations and the policies of foreign governments in the conflict.

Journalist and author Christopher Hitchens described The Road to Bellapais as "the most naively pro-Turkish account of the Cyprus problem yet to be published". Hitchens also criticized Oberling's selection of sources, observing that the book's acknowledgements included official Turkish sources but no Greek sources.

Historian Jan Asmussen also criticized both Oberling's The Road to Bellapais and Harry Scott Gibbons's The Genocide Files as heavily biased and pro-Turkish in nature. Asmussen criticized their failure to record crimes and political failures committed by Turkey and the Turkish Cypriot leadership.

== Armenian genocide denial ==
In May 1985, Oberling was listed among 69 American scholars who signed a public statement opposing the wording of a proposed United States congressional resolution commemorating the Armenian genocide. Published as a newspaper advertisement on 19 May 1985 and subsequently reproduced in the Congressional Record, the statement disputed the resolution's characterization of the mass killing of Armenians as genocide, engaging in Armenian genocide denial. It argued that the events of 1915–1923 had occurred primarily in the context of "intercommunal warfare" between Muslims and Christians, accompanied by famine, disease and massacres, and maintained that "further historical research" was necessary before responsibility could be established. The statement also rejected the attribution of responsibility to Turkey, distinguishing the Ottoman Empire from the modern Republic of Turkey. Oberling was identified among its signatories as a professor of history at Hunter College. The declaration formed part of a broader effort to oppose congressional recognition of the Armenian genocide.

Historians Türkay Salim Nefes, Doğan Gürpınar and Özgür Kaymak state that this was part of an organized denial campaign led by Turkish diplomatic and academic institutions in order to oppose the recognition of the Armenian genocide. They noted that the Institute of Turkish Studies, established with Turkish government funding, had directed the preparation of the letter signed by the 69 scholars.

== Personal life and death ==
Oberling died on 22 March 2014 at his home in Reston, Virginia, following a brief illness. He had two children.

== Selected works ==
- The Turkic Peoples of Southern Iran (1960).
- Journeys to the Sea of Zanj: Poems 1947–1971 (1971).
- The Qashqa'i Nomads of Fars (1974). Mouton.
- The Road to Bellapais: The Turkish Cypriot Exodus to Northern Cyprus (1982). Social Science Monographs.
- The Cyprus Tragedy (1989). K. Rustem & Brother.
- Negotiating for Survival: The Turkish Cypriot Quest for a Solution to the Cyprus Problem (1991). Aldington Press.
- The Double Representation Conspiracy: How the Greek and Greek Cypriot Governments Are Precipitating a New Crisis in Cyprus by Using the European Union. CYREP.
- The Heart of a Nation: A History of Turkish Cypriot Culture 1571–2001 (2007). K. Rustem & Brother.
