= Eskişehir Enveriye railway station =

Railway station in Turkey

Eskişehir Enveriye
- Layout of the stations in Eskişehir

General information
- Location: Kütahya yolu, Tepebașı, Eskişehir 26140; Turkey
- Coordinates: 39.77363869°N 30.48485074°E
- Owner: Turkish State Railways
- Platforms: 2 side platforms
- Tracks: 2

History
- Opened: 1894
- Closed: 2014
- Electrified: 25 kV AC
Location
- Location within Turkey

Enveriye Railway Station is a railway station in Eskişehir. It services trains from Istanbul Haydarpaşa Terminal heading south on the Eskişehir–Konya railway. Due to the opening of the Ankara–Istanbul high-speed railway in 2014, conventional trains no longer operate on the Istanbul–Denizli and Istanbul–Konya–Adana–Gaziantep routes. For this reason, the station does not currently serve any trains.
