= Israel Charny =

Israeli psychologist and genocide scholar (1931–2024)

- ישראל זאב צ'רני
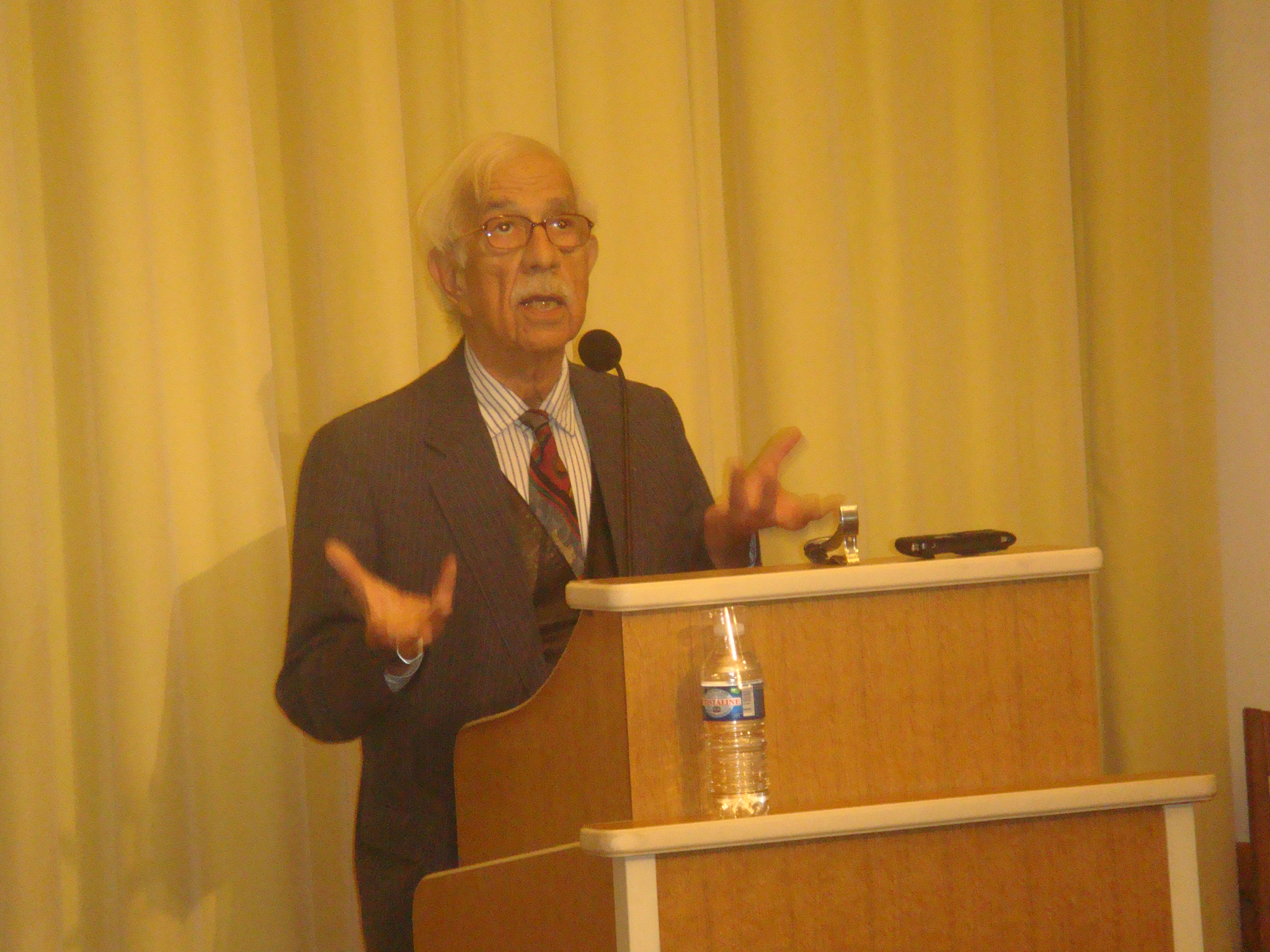
- Charny in 2010
- Born: 18 July 1931; Brooklyn, New York, U.S.
- Died: 14 December 2024 (aged 93); Jerusalem, Israel
- Occupation(s): Psychologist, genocide scholar

Israel W. Charny (Hebrew: ישראל צ'רני; 18 July 1931 – 14 December 2024) was an Israeli psychologist and genocide scholar. He was the editor of two-volume Encyclopedia of Genocide, and executive director of the Institute on the Holocaust and Genocide in Jerusalem.

== Biography ==
Israel Charny received his A.B. in psychology with distinction from Temple University in 1952, and his Ph.D. in clinical psychology from the University of Rochester in 1957. He established and directed the first group psychological practice in the Philadelphia area (1958–1973), where he was also the first professor of psychology at the newly founded Reconstructionist Rabbinical College in Philadelphia.

An affiliate of the Institute for the Study of Genocide, the International Association of Genocide Scholars was founded in 1994 by Israel Charny, Helen Fein, Robert Melson and Roger Smith. From 2005 to 2007, he was vice president and then president of the organization.

Charny was devoted to the study of the Holocaust and genocide since the mid-1960s. His first publication on the subject which appeared in Jewish Education in 1968 was "Teaching the Violence of the Holocaust: A Challenge to Educating Potential Future Oppressors and Victims for Nonviolence." He once wrote, "...Genocide in the generic sense means the mass killing of substantial numbers of human beings, when not in the course of military action against the military forces of an avowed enemy, under conditions of the essential defencelessness of the victim..."

Charny, a clinical psychologist and practicing psychotherapist, was professor of psychology and family therapy at the Hebrew University of Jerusalem, where he was the founder and first director of the Program for Advanced Studies in Integrative Psychotherapy (Family, Couples, Individual and Group Therapy) of the Martin Buber Center and Department of Psychology. He was the founding and first president of the Israel Association of Family Therapy and later a president of the International Family Therapy Association.

He is best known for his active stance against denial of the Armenian genocide, and has written articles and given lectures on the subjects of genocide and genocide denial. He is most noted for his comparison of Armenian genocide denial to Holocaust denial, citing that they both have similar techniques and psychological motivation.

Charny died in Jerusalem on 14 December 2024, at the age of 93.

== Views ==
During the Israeli invasion of the Gaza Strip, Charney said: "Israel [should] offer to cease all fighting following return of all Israeli hostages. At the same time, Israel should underscore its readiness to return to massive destruction of Gaza in response to any further bombings or invasions by Hamas."

== Selected publications ==
- Marital Love and Hate
- Existential/Dialectical Marital Therapy
- Encyclopedia of Genocide (Note: Each of these three books was awarded "Outstanding Academic Book of the Year" by Choice of the American Library Association.)
- Genocide: A Critical Bibliographic Review
- The Widening Circle of Genocide
- Century of Genocide Critical Essays and Eyewitness Accounts
- Fascism and Democracy in the Human Mind
- The Genocide Contagion
- — (2003). "A classification of denials of the Holocaust and other genocides". Journal of Genocide Research. 5 (1). Informa UK: 11–34. doi:10.1080/14623520305645. ISSN 1462-3528. Republished in Lattimer, Mark, ed. (2007). Genocide and human rights. International library of essays on rights. Ashgate. doi:10.4324/9781351157568-19. ISBN 978-0-7546-2448-6.

Israel's Failed Response to the Armenian Genocide Denial, State Deception, Truth versus Politicization of History. Academic Studies Press. Boston, 2021.
