= Eric Markusen =

American sociologist (1946–2007)

Eric Markusen (8 October 1946 – 29 January 2007) (BA in sociology and psychology in 1969 from Macalester College in St Paul, Minnesota, M.S.W., University of Washington, Ph.D., University of Minnesota) was Professor of Sociology and Social Work at Southwest Minnesota State University in Marshall, Minnesota, USA, and research director of the Danish Center for Holocaust and Genocide Studies in Copenhagen. He also served as associate editor of the two-volume Encyclopedia of Genocide, published in 1999.

Markusen's research took him to former Soviet satellites, Cambodia, Croatia, Bosnia, Poland, Serbia, Ethiopia, Eritrea, Rwanda and Chad. His later study focused on genocidal violence in former Yugoslavia during the 1990s, and the genocide cases before the International Criminal Tribunals for the former Yugoslavia and Rwanda.

The 2007 conference of the International Association of Genocide Scholars was dedicated to Markusen's memory.

== Selected publications ==
- Genocide in Darfur (with S. Totten, 2006)
- Collective Violence: Harmful Behavior in Groups and Governments (with C. Summers, 1999)
- Holocaust and Strategic Bombing: Genocide and Total War in the Twentieth Century (co-edited with D. Kopf, 1995)
- Computers, ethics, and collective violence (with C. Summers), Journal of Systems and Software, 1992, 17(1), 91–103.
- The Genocide Mentality: Nazi Holocaust and Nuclear Threat (with R. Lifton, 1990)
