= Namık Kemal Yolga =

Turkish statesman (1914–2001)

Namık Kemal Yolga

Namık Kemal Yolga (1914–2001) was a Turkish diplomat and statesman. During World War II, Yolga was the Vice-Consul at the Turkish Embassy in Paris, France. He claimed to have saved the lives of Turkish Jews from the Nazis but this has been challenged due to lack of evidence. In fact, evidence suggests that Yolga was actually instrumental in stripping France-born Turkish Jews of citizenship, which could have saved them from the Holocaust. He has been given a national award by the Turkish government and a Jewish foundation in Turkey.

== Career ==
Namık Kemal Yolga was posted to the Turkish Embassy in Paris in 1940 as the Vice-Consul, his first diplomatic post in a foreign country. Two months later the Nazis invaded and occupied France. They forced the roundup of Jews, sending those from the Paris area to the Drancy deportation camp. From there they were to be sent east to concentration camps.

Young Yolga claimed to have saved Turkish Jews one by one from the Nazi authorities, by picking them up from Drancy, driving them in his own car and hiding them in safe places. In his autobiography, Yolga described his efforts as:

Every time we learnt that a Turkish Jew was captured and sent to Drancy, the Turkish Embassy sent an ultimatum to the German Embassy in Paris and demanded his/her release, specifically pointing out that the Turkish Constitution does not discriminate its people for their race or religion, therefore Turkish Jews are Turkish nationals and Germans have no right to arrest them as Turkey was a neutral country during the war. Then I used to go to Drancy to pick him/her up with my car and put them in a safe house. As far as I know, only one Turkish Jew from Bordeaux was sent to a camp in Germany as the Turkish Embassy was not aware of his arrest at the time.

In fact, according to Serge Klarsfeld's "Mémorial de la Déportation des Juifs de France", 1300 Turkish Jews, among which 939 officially recognized as Turkish by the Nazis, were deported.

Their fate depended entirely of the versatile decision of the Turkish bureau staff. According to the laws enacted by Turkey during the 1930s, all emigrated citizens who did not register at the Consulates, or did not fulfill their military duty, lost their Turkish nationality, and this was the situation for the majority of the Jews.

Thanks to the efforts of the well known Auschwitz survivor Haim Vidal Sephiha, a Turkish Jew deported from Belgium, monuments, plaques and listings of Turkish Jews names are now present on the main extermination sites.

See also Benjamin Schatzma's "Journal d'un interné, Volume II", the works of historian and university scholar Esther Benbassa, and the article by Claude Wainstain on Necdet Kent, another "Turkish Schindler", whose biography seems also legendary.

Namık Kemal Yolga later served as an Ambassador in Rome, Paris, Caracas, Tehran and Moscow. In addition he served as General Secretary in the Turkish Foreign Ministry.

== Legacy and honors ==
- Yolga was honored by the "500. Yıl Vakfı" (Quincentennial Foundation) in 1998.
- Yolga, Selahattin Ülkümen and Necdet Kent were honored with Turkey's Supreme Service Medal for rescuing Jews during the Holocaust.
- Turkish postal stamp of 2009.

== See also ==
- List of Turkish diplomats
- History of the Jews in Turkey
- Necdet Kent
- Behiç Erkin
- Selahattin Ülkümen
