= Selahattin Ülkümen =

Turkish diplomat and Righteous Among the Nations recipient

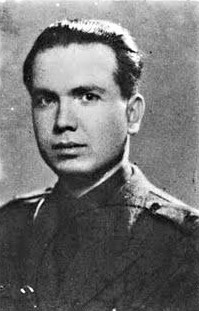
- Ülkümen during his military service in the 1930s
- Born: 14 January 1914; Antakya, Ottoman Empire (now Turkey)
- Died: 7 June 2003 (aged 89); Istanbul, Turkey
- Occupation: Diplomat on the island of Rodes
- Known for: Saving Jews from the Holocaust during World War II
- Spouse: Mihrinissa Yetmen Ülkümen
- Children: 1
- Honours: Righteous Among the Nations (1989)
- Military career
- Allegiance: Republic of Turkey
- Branch: Turkish Armed Forces
- Service years: c. 1930s

Notes
- Selahettin was a Muslim, but called himself Yad Vashem while in Jerusulem

Selahattin Ülkümen (14 January 1914 – 7 June 2003) was a Turkish diplomat who was recognized by Israel as one of the Righteous Among the Nations in 1989, with his name being listed at Yad Vashem in the city of Jerusalem. During World War II, he was serving as a consul-general of Turkey on the island of Rhodes, Greece, which had been invaded and occupied by Nazi Germany. Ülkümen assisted the island's Jews by personally intervening to prevent as many of them as possible from being deported by the Germans amidst the Holocaust. In total, he managed to save around 50 Jews—13 on the basis of their Turkish citizenship, and the remainder through his own initiatives.

Jews in Axis-occupied Greece were deported from Corfu and sent to Nazi death camps, namely Auschwitz. Rhodes, where Ülkümen was posted, had a Jewish population of some 2,000 at the time of the German invasion, which had followed the signing of an armistice between Italy and the Allies amidst the fall of the Fascist regime.

== Background ==
Rhodes, inhabited by a Greek majority and a substantial Turkish minority, was ruled by the Ottoman Empire for 390 years, until 1912 when Italy imposed its rule on Rhodes and the other Dodecanese islands. The Germans took over in September 1943 after Italy withdrew from the war. By the 1940s, the ethnic Jewish community numbered about 2,000, made up of people from Turkey, Greece, Italy and other Mediterranean countries, as well as those native to the island.

== Intervention on behalf of boatmen ==
Before his intervention on behalf of Jews during the July 1944 deportations, Ülkümen had already come into conflict with the German occupation authorities on Rhodes. After Italy's surrender in September 1943, some Italian soldiers attempted to escape from Rhodes to the nearby Turkish coast. Local Turkish and Greek boatmen, including fishermen and boat owners, were accused by the Germans of helping them.

In his memoirs, Ülkümen wrote that boatmen in Rhodes were arrested for transporting Italian soldiers to Anatolia and were to be executed by firing squad. He recalled that the wives, children and relatives of the detained men came to the Turkish consulate asking him to save them, after which he went to see the German military governor of the Dodecanese.

Nathan Shachar describes the Germans as having taken 39 Rhodian fishermen and other boat owners hostage, most of them Turks and some Greeks. Yücel Güçlü similarly states that Ülkümen secured the release of 39 Turkish and Greek boatmen who had been condemned to death for taking Italian soldiers to refuge in Turkey. According to these accounts, the episode increased German hostility toward Ülkümen.

== Bombing of the Turkish consulate ==
On 18 February 1944, the Turkish consulate in Rhodes was bombed. Two consular employees, Hasan and Hüseyin, were killed. Ülkümen was wounded, and his wife, Mihrinisa Ülkümen, was gravely injured.

Responsibility for the bombing has been described differently in later accounts. British aircraft frequently carried out raids against German-held Rhodes, and some accounts have attributed the damage to an Allied air raid. Ülkümen, however, maintained in his memoirs that the consulate was deliberately bombed by German aircraft while Rhodes was under German occupation. Nathan Shachar also supports this interpretation, writing that German aircraft had previously harassed the consulate and that German personnel later removed bomb fragments from the consulate garden.

The bombing took place several months before the July 1944 deportation of the Jews of Rhodes. It followed a period of mounting tension between Ülkümen and the German authorities, including his earlier intervention on behalf of Turkish and Greek boatmen accused of helping Italian soldiers escape to the Turkish mainland.

== Intervention on behalf of the Jews of Rhodes ==
On 19 July 1944, the Gestapo ordered all of the island's Jewish population to gather at its headquarters. They were told that they were being registered for "temporary transportation to a small island nearby", but in reality they were being assembled for deportation to Auschwitz. Ülkümen went to the German commanding officer, General Ulrich Kleemann, and reminded him that Turkey was neutral in World War II. He requested the release of Jews who were Turkish citizens, as well as their spouses and relatives, many of whom were Italian or Greek citizens.

At first, Kleemann refused, stating that under Nazi law Jews were considered Jews regardless of nationality and had to be sent to the concentration camps. Ülkümen replied that under Turkish law all citizens were equal and that Turkey did not distinguish between citizens who were Jewish, Christian or Muslim.

Ülkümen’s intervention went beyond the normal protection of Turkish nationals. Of the roughly 42 or 43 people for whom he sought protection, only a minority were Turkish citizens. Nathan Shachar writes that Ülkümen included people whose Turkish papers had expired and others who were only married to Turkish citizens. When German officials objected that many of those listed were not Turkish citizens, Ülkümen insisted that Turkish law regarded the spouses of Turkish citizens as Turkish. Shachar notes that this claim was not legally accurate, but that the Germans ultimately accepted most of Ülkümen’s definitions. Yücel Güçlü similarly describes Ülkümen as having exercised his consular authority creatively and pragmatically, acting without prior instructions but in a manner that would later be approved by the Turkish Ministry of Foreign Affairs.

As a result of his intervention, several dozen Jews were released from the deportation convoy. Those who remained under Turkish protection were spared deportation to Auschwitz, where most of the Jews of Rhodes were murdered.

== After the July 1944 deportation ==
The Jews who remained on Rhodes under Turkish protection continued to face pressure from the German authorities. According to Yücel Güçlü, they were required to report each morning at 8 a.m. to the Gestapo, where they were held for one or two hours without explanation. Güçlü also states that the Germans repeatedly threatened to deport some of them, including spouses and children of Turkish citizens, although these threats were not carried out.

Nathan Shachar similarly writes that Giamila Tarica and the other Jews who had escaped deportation with Turkish help had to report daily to the SS office near the Puccini cinema, although the requirement was later relaxed so that only the men had to appear.

In early 1945, the remaining Jews protected by Ülkümen were sent from Rhodes to Turkey. Ülkümen’s memoir publication states that after the Germans learned that a Red Cross delegation was expected to inspect Rhodes, the 42 Jews whom he had saved were released from the island on 10 January 1945 in small, overcrowded boats. Shachar writes that the group reached Marmaris, spent several days there, and was then sent on to Cyprus, where the British authorities quarantined them near Larnaca before they later returned to Rhodes.

== After the war ==
After the war, Ülkümen and his wife returned to Turkey.

Ülkümen continued his diplomatic career and raised his son, Mehmet Ülkümen. Family records indicate that Mehmet was born in Ankara on 21 July 1945, and that Mihrinisa Ülkümen died soon afterward from complications following childbirth.

Ülkümen died of natural causes on 7 June 2003 in Istanbul, Turkey, at the age of 89.

== Legacy and honors ==
Maurice Soriano, the head of the 35-person Jewish community who remained in Rhodes after the war, stated, "I am indebted to the Turkish consul who made extraordinary efforts to save my life and those of my fellow countrymen."

- Quincentennial Foundation Vice President, historian Naim Guleryuz, collected testimony from living survivors and applied to Israel for recognition of Ülkümen’s actions during the war. On 13 December 1989, the Yad Vashem Foundation of Israel declared Ülkümen one of the Righteous Among the Nations. His name was inscribed at the memorial and a tree planted in his honor at the "Path of the Righteous."
- In 1998 Israel issued a postage stamp in Ülkümen's honor.
- On 5 June 2012, the Selahattin Ülkümen school was inaugurated in the city of Van, built jointly by the Jewish Community of Turkey and the American Jewish Joint Distribution Committee.

== See also ==
- History of the Jews in Turkey
- History of the Jews in Greece
- Kahal Shalom Synagogue
- Necdet Kent
- Behiç Erkin
- Namık Kemal Yolga
- List of Turkish diplomats
