= Marc David Baer =

American-British historian

Marc David Baer is an historian and professor of International History at the London School of Economics and Political Science.

== Life ==
Baer was born in Columbia, South Carolina. He celebrated his bar mitzvah in Germany. Baer received his Bachelor's of Arts from Northwestern University and his Ph.D. from the University of Chicago.

He is a scholar of Middle Eastern and European History. Baer conducts research utilising English, French, German, Greek, Turkish including Ottoman Turkish, Hebrew, Persian and Arabic. He is the author of seven books.

In addition, he has published works on Turks in Germany including “Mistaken for Jews: Turkish Ph.D. Students in Nazi Germany” (German Studies Review) and “Turk and Jew in Berlin: The First Turkish Migration to Berlin and the Shoah” (Comparative Studies in Society & History) as well as German-Jewish converts to Islam including “Protestant Islam in Weimar Germany: Hugo Marcus and ‘The Message of the Holy Prophet Muhammad to Europe.’” (New German Critique) and “Muslim Encounters with Nazism and the Holocaust: The Ahmadi of Berlin and German-Jewish Convert to Islam Hugo Marcus" (The American Historical Review).

== Publications ==
=== Books ===
- Honored by the Glory of Islam: Conversion and Conquest in Ottoman Europe. Oxford University Press, Oxford, 2008. • Winner, Albert Hourani Prize, Middle East Studies Association, Best Book in Middle East Studies, (2008). (Turkish translation, IV. Mehmet Döneminde Osmanlı Avrupasında İhtida ve Fetih, Hil, 2010)
- The Dönme: Jewish Converts, Muslim Revolutionaries, and Secular Turks. Stanford University Press, California, USA, 2010. (Turkish translation, Selânikli Dönmeler: Musevilikten Dönenler, Müslüman Devrimciler, ve Laik Türkler, Doğan, 2011)
- At Meydanı'nda Ölüm: 17. Yüzyıl İstanbul'unda Toplumsal Cinsiyet, Hoşgörü ve İhtida (Death on the Hippodrome: Gender, Tolerance, and Conversion in 17th century Istanbul) (Istanbul: Koç Yayınları, 2016)
- Sultanic Saviors and Tolerant Turks: Writing Ottoman Jewish History, Denying the Armenian Genocide (Bloomington, Indiana: Indiana University Press, 2020). Winner, 2021 Dr. Sona Aronian Book Prize for Excellence in Armenian Studies (for a book published in 2020), National Association for Armenian Studies and Research (NAASR)
- German, Jew, Muslim, Gay: The Life and Times of Hugo Marcus (New York: Columbia University Press, 2020)
- The Ottomans: Khans, Caesars and Caliphs (New York: Basic Books, 2021), short-listed for the Wolfson History Prize, 2022
- Children of Abraham: The 1,400-Year History of Jewish–Muslim Relations (New York: Basic Books, 2026)
